= 2009 in Nepal =

- Decades: 1980s; 1990s; 2000s; 2010s; 2020s
- See also: Other events of 2009; Timeline of Nepalese history

Events from the year 2009 in Nepal.

== Incumbents ==
- President: Ram Baran Yadav
- Prime Minister: Prachanda (until 25 May), Madhav Kumar Nepal (starting 25 May)
- Vice President: Parmanand Jha
- Chief Justice: Dilip Kumar Poudel (until 7 May), Min Bahadur Rayamajhi (starting 7 May)

== Deaths ==
- 11 January - Uma Singh
- 16 January - Indra Lohani.
- 12 June - Shailaja Acharya
- 13 November - Tek Bahadur Chokhyal
