= 2013 in Nepal =

- Decades: 1990s; 2000s; 2010s; 2020s
- See also: Other events of 2013; Timeline of Nepalese history

Events from the year 2013 in Nepal.

== Incumbents ==
- President: Ram Baran Yadav
- Prime Minister: Baburam Bhattarai (until 14 March), Khil Raj Regmi (acting) (starting 14 March)
- Vice President: Parmanand Jha
- Chief Justice: Khil Raj Regmi

== Incumbents ==
- 14 March - Khil Raj Regmi became acting Prime minister.

== Events ==
- 19 November - Nepali Congress wins 196 of 575 elected seats in the Nepalese Constituent Assembly election

== Deaths ==
- 9 September - Phatteman Rajbhandari, vocalist and musician
- 31 October - Jagadish Ghimire, writer and political analyst
- 24 December - Hutta Ram Baidya, Bagmati conservation activist

== See also ==
- Years in India
- Years in China
