= 2012 in Nepal =

- Decades: 1990s; 2000s; 2010s; 2020s
- See also: Other events of 2012; Timeline of Nepalese history

The following lists events that happened during 2012 in Nepal.

== Incumbents ==
- President: Ram Baran Yadav
- Prime Minister: Baburam Bhattarai
- Vice President: Parmanand Jha
- Chief Justice: Khil Raj Regmi

== Events ==
=== May ===
- May 5 - At least 13 people are killed and dozens of others are declared missing as a result of a Nepal flash flood after a mountain river burst its banks.
- May 14 - An Agni Air flight carrying 21 people crashes while attempting a landing at the mountainous Jomsom Airport. Indian child actress Taruni Sachdev is among the 15 people killed.
- May 16 - British musician Oz Bayldon, representing Music4children, establishes a Guinness World Record by performing the highest concert on land, at 6,676 m (21,246 ft), on Mera Peak.
- May 28
  - Nepal has neither constitution nor a sitting legislature after an attempt to develop a new national constitution was unsuccessful.
  - The first Racemandu motorcycle racing event is organized.
- May 31 - Supreme Court Justice Rana Bahadur Bam is assassinated in Lalitpur.

=== September ===
- September 6 - The United States removes the Unified Communist Party of Nepal (Maoist) from their terror list, citing "a credible commitment to pursuing peace and reconciliation". In June, a group around party vice-president Mohan Baidya announced a split in the party.

== See also ==
- Years in India
- Years in China
