= 2015 in Nepal =

- Decades: 1990s; 2000s; 2010s; 2020s
- See also: Other events of 2015; Timeline of Nepalese history

The following lists events that happened during 2015 in the Federal Democratic Republic of Nepal.

== Incumbents ==
- President: Ram Baran Yadav
- Prime Minister: Sushil Koirala, K. P. Sharma Oli
- Vice President: Parmanand Jha
- Chief Justice: Ram Kumar Prasad Shah (until 7 July), Kalyan Shrestha (starting 7 July)

== Events ==
=== January ===
- January 5 - Introduction of separate buses for women.

=== March ===
- March 4 - Turkish Airlines Flight TK726, landing in dense fog in Kathmandu, skids off a slippery runway, however, there are no serious injuries.

=== April ===
- April 25 - A magnitude 7.8 earthquake struck Nepal with epicenter at Gorkha at a depth of 15.0 km (9.3 mi). In total, at least 10,000 people were killed in Nepal, India, Bangladesh, and China.

=== May ===
- May 12 - A magnitude 7.3 earthquake with the epicenter at Dolakha kills at least 66 people in Nepal.

=== September ===
- September 20 - Nepal formally promulgates the Constitution of Nepal through its 2nd Nepalese Constituent Assembly.
- September 23 - The Indian government blocks vehicles carrying goods towards Nepal through its territory citing insecurity in Nepal's Southern regions which continues for almost six months.

=== October ===
- October 12 - K.P. Sharma Oli is elected by the parliament as the Prime Minister of Nepal.
- October 29 - Bidhya Devi Bhandari first Nepalese woman President to hold the office.

== Deaths ==
- Surya Bahadur Thapa, five times Prime Minister
- Bharat Raj Upreti, 64, Nepali judge, justice of the Supreme Court (2009–2013), suicide by hanging.
