= 2011 in Nepal =

- Decades: 1990s; 2000s; 2010s; 2020s
- See also: Other events of 2011; Timeline of Nepalese history

Events from the year 2011 in Nepal.

== Incumbents ==
- President: Ram Baran Yadav
- Prime Minister:
  - until 6 February: Madhav Kumar Nepal
  - 6 February-29 August: Jhala Nath Khanal
  - starting 29 August: Baburam Bhattarai
- Vice President: Parmanand Jha
- Chief Justice: Ram Prasad Shrestha (until 5 May), Khil Raj Regmi (starting 5 May)

== Incumbents ==
- 29 August - Baburam Bhattarai became prime minister.

== Events ==
- In January 2011, The UN mission in Nepal officially ended after disarming Maoist rebels to support peace in the country.
- An earthquake known as 2011 Sikkim earthquake struck between Sikkim, India, and Nepal and resulted in severe structural damage, power blackouts, and deaths.
- In September 2011, a Buddha air flight crashed in Nepal and resulted in the death of all 19 on the plane,16 tourists and 3 crew members.
- In April 2011, global oil prices spiked due to the Libyan crisis and caused an acute fuel shortage in Nepal.

== Deaths ==
- 4 March - Krishna Prasad Bhattarai, former Prime Minister
- 19 January - Hira Devi Waiba
- 20 April - Tul Bahadur pun
