= 2010 in Nepal =

- Decades: 1990s; 2000s; 2010s; 2020s
- See also: Other events of 2010; Timeline of Nepalese history

Events from the year 2010 in Nepal.

== Incumbents ==
- President: Ram Baran Yadav
- Prime Minister: Madhav Kumar Nepal
- Vice President: Parmanand Jha
- Chief Justice:
  - until 10 February: Min Bahadur Rayamajhi
  - 10 February-25 March: Anup Raj Sharma
  - starting 26 March: Ram Prasad Shrestha

== Events ==
- September 17 - 12th General Convention of the Nepali Congress starts in Kathmandu.

== Deaths ==
- 20 March - Girija Prasad Koirala
