= 2008 in Nepal =

- Decades: 1980s; 1990s; 2000s; 2010s; 2020s
- See also: Other events of 2008; Timeline of Nepalese history

The following lists events that happened during 2008 in Nepal.

== Incumbents ==
- Monarch: Gyanendra (until May 28) - monarchy abolished
- President: Ram Baran Yadav (starting 23 July)
- Prime Minister: Girija Prasad Koirala (starting 25 May and ending 18 August), Prachanda (starting 18 August)
- Vice President: Parmanand Jha (starting 23 July)
- Chief Justice: Kedar Prasad Giri

== Events ==
=== May ===
- May 26 - Nepalese authorities ban rallies and mass meetings in Kathmandu prior to the first meeting of the 1st Nepalese Constituent Assembly which is expected to declare Nepal a republic.
- May 28 - The Nepalese Constituent Assembly meets for the first time after the 2008 Nepalese Constituent Assembly election and votes to abolish the monarchy and establish a republic.

=== June ===
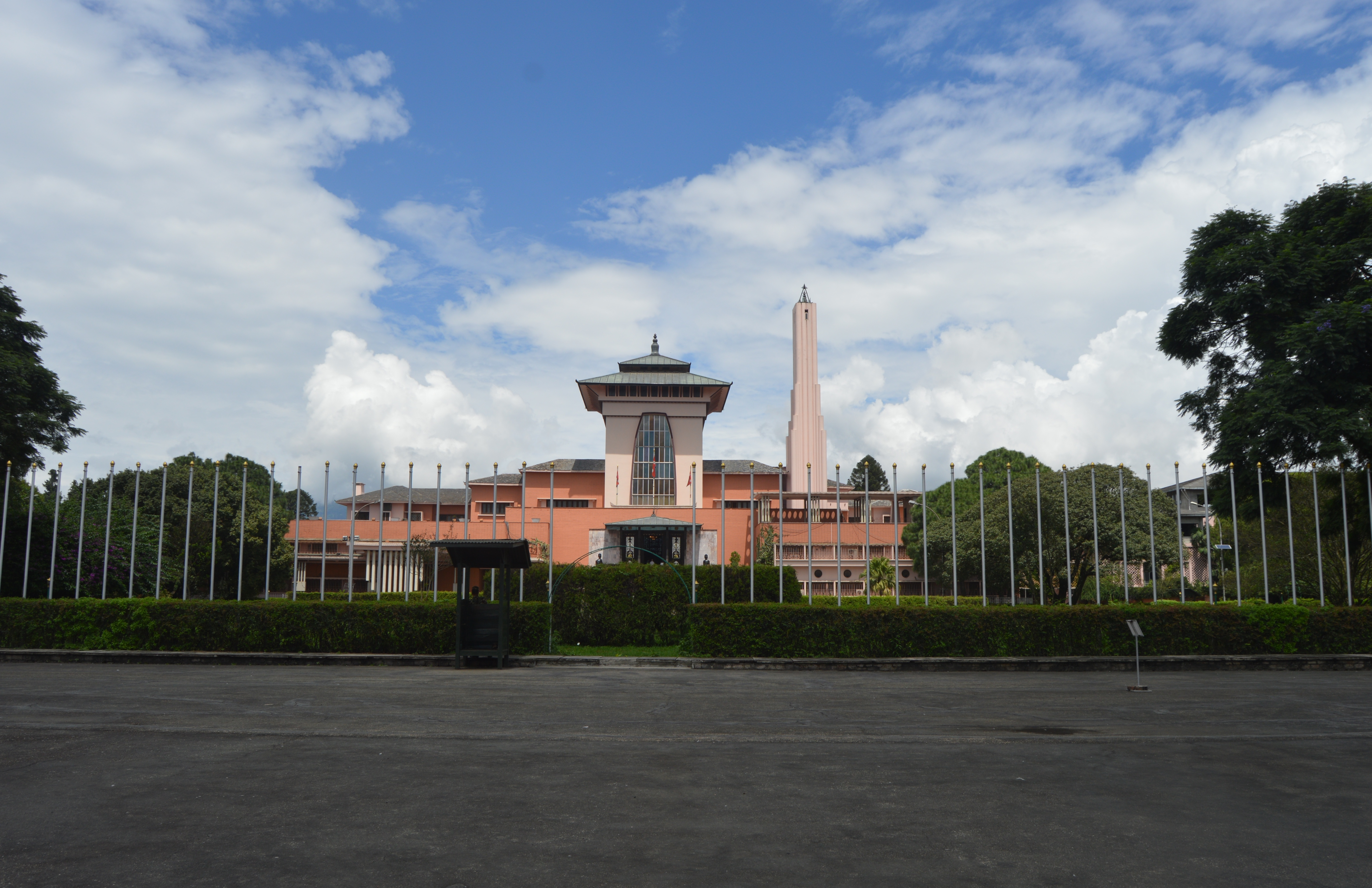
Narayanhiti Palace

- June 11 - The last King of Nepal Gyanendra departs from Narayanhiti Palace for the last time after Nepal is declared to be a republic.

=== July ===
- July 21 - Nepal's presidential election concludes with Ram Baran Yadav winning with a majority.

=== August ===
- August 15 - The Nepalese Constituent Assembly elects former Maoist rebel Prachanda as the first Prime Minister of Nepal as a republic.

== Deaths ==
Edmund Hillary - First person to reach top of Everest.
