= 2019 in Nepal =

- Decades: 1990s; 2000s; 2010s; 2020s
- See also: Other events of 2019; Timeline of Nepalese history

Events in the year 2019 in Nepal.

== Incumbents ==
- President : Bidhya Devi Bhandari
- Vice President : Nanda Kishor Pun
- Prime Minister : Khadga Prasad Oli
- Chief Justice : Om Prakash Mishra (until January 1), Cholendra Shumsher Rana (since January 2)
- Chairman of National Assembly : Ganesh Prasad Timilsina
- Speaker of House of Representatives : Krishna Bahadur Mahara (until October 1)

=== Provincial Governors ===
- Governor of Bagmati Province: Anuradha Koirala (starting 19 January and ending 3 November), Bishnu Prasad Prasain (starting 5 November)
- Governor of Gandaki Province: Baburam Kunwar (starting 19 January and ending 3 November), Amik Sherchan (starting 5 November)
- Governor of Karnali Province: Durga Keshar Khanal (starting 19 January and ending 3 November), Govinda Prasad Kalauni (starting 5 November)
- Governor of Koshi Province: Govinda Subba (until 3 November), Somnath Adhikari (starting 3 November)
- Governor of Lumbini Province: Uma Kant Jha (starting 19 January and ending 3 November), Dharmanath Yadav (starting 5 November)
- Governor of Madhesh Province: Rakesh Kumar Sah Rauniyar (starting 19 January and ending 3 November), Tilak Pariyar (starting 5 November)
- Governor of Sudurpashchim Province: Mohan Raj Malla (starting 19 January and ending 3 November), Sharmila Kumari Panta (starting 5 November)

== Events ==
=== January ===
- January 3
  - Resham Lal Chaudhary, one of the alleged perpetrators of the Tikapur Massacre, is sworn in as a member of Pratinidhi Sabha. He was elected from Kailali - 1 in the 2017 Nepalese legislative election as a candidate of Rastriya Janata Party Nepal.
  - Special Court sentences former Additional Inspector General of Armed Police Force Rishav Dev Bhattarai to 9 months in detention for corruption.
- January 8 - 2018–19 Martyr's Memorial A-Division League concludes. Manang Marshyangdi Club become champions for the eighth time.
- January 9 - Govinda K.C. begins his 16th hunger strike to protest against the proposed Medical Education Bill.
- January 11 - 16 central committee members of Bibeksheel Sajha Party leave to form a new party.
- January - Convicted felon Rajiv Gurung, alias Deepak Manange, is sworn in as a member of Provincial Assembly of Gandaki. He was released from prison in December 2018.

=== February ===
- February 1 - Govinda K.C. postpones his hunger strike.
- February 6 - Supreme Court orders government to recover capital gains tax from Ncell and Axiata in relation to the 12 April 2016 sale of Ncell from Telia Company.
- February 14 - Commission for the Investigation of Abuse of Authority commissioner Raj Narayan Pathak resigns. He is said to have taken 8.7 million rupees as bribe to settle corruption claim in Nepal Engineering College.
- February 27 - Minister of Culture, Tourism Culture and Civil Aviation Rabindra Adhikari is among 7 killed in a helicopter crash.

=== March ===
- March 6 - Rastriya Janata Party Nepal parliamentarian Resham Chaudhary is sentenced to life imprisonment for his role in the Tikapur Massacre.
- March 12 - The political party led by Netra Bikram Chand is labeled as a criminal group and its activities banned, leading to nationwide arrests of its members.
- March 29–30: Nepal Investment submit held in kathmandu.
- March 31 - A tornado kills 28 people in Parsa and Bara. It is the first verified record of a tornado event in the country.

=== April ===
- April 14
  - Nepali New Year, Bikram Sambat 2076 begins
  - A Summit Air Let L-410 Turbolet veers off the runway during takeoff at Lukla Airport, impacting a helicopter and killing 3 including the co-pilot.
- April 18 - NepaliSat-1, the first ever research satellite to be sent to space by Nepal launches.

=== May ===
- May 26 - Four people are killed and seven injured as a result of accidental explosions in three separate incidents in Kathmandu. All casualties are reported to be involved with the banned political outfit led by Netra Bikram Chand.
- May 29 - Finance Minister Yuba Raj Khatiwada presented the federal budget of Fiscal Year 2019/20 in a joint sitting of both houses of the Federal Parliament.

=== June ===
- June 7 - Pranesh Gautam, a youtuber, is arrested for his satirical review of the movie Bir Bikram 2 on the YouTube channel memeNepal.
- June 18
  - Government withdraws the Guthi Bill tabled in the upper house, ahead of a protest gathering announced for the following day.
  - A vehicle fell off the road in Kharpunath gaunpalika, Humla killing 12 including the gaunpalika vice chairman Sindhu Hamal Shahi.
- June 20 - Meteorological Forecasting Division announces that monsoon has entered Nepal, ten days later than the usual date of June 10.

=== July ===
- July 5 - The cabinet backtracks on its decision to conduct pesticide residue tests on agricultural products entering into the country leading to criticism of the government from even its own party members claiming that it had bowed to Indian pressure.
- July 12–13 - At least 90 people are killed and 29 people are missing due to disasters related to continuous rainfall.

=== September ===
- September 19 - Summer session of parliament ends.

=== October ===
- October 1 - Speaker of the House of Representatives Krishna Bahadur Mahara resigns after being accused of rape by a female staff of Parliament.
- October 6 - Krishna Bahadur Mahara is arrested from the Speaker's residence in Baluwatar for investigation with the rape accusation against him.
- October 12 - Chinese President and General Secretary of the Communist Party Xi Jinping arrives on a two-day state visit at the invitation of President Bidhya Devi Bhandari.
- October 13 - House of Representative member Mohammad Aftab Alam of Nepali Congress is arrested in connection with an explosion and the subsequent murder of at least 23 persons in Rautahat in 2008.
- October 15 - House of Representative member Pramod Sah of Rastriya Janata Party-Nepal is arrested for vandalism of an airline counter at Janakpur Airport.
- October 16 - Police issue an arrest warrant for House of Representative member Parbat Gurung of Nepal Communist Party (NCP) on the charge of assault during the local level elections in 2017.
- October 24 - Rapper VTEN is arrested for controversial lyrics in his song Hami Yestai Ta Ho Ni Bro.

=== November ===
- November 3 - President Bidhya Devi Bhandari removes all seven provincial governors on recommendation of the Council of Ministers.
- November 5 - President Bidhya Devi Bhandari administers oath of office to new governors of all seven provinces.
- November 9 - Prime Minister K.P Oli convenes an all party meeting to discuss the release of a new political map by India that depicts the disputed Kalapani within India's border.
- November 30 - By-election for vacant seats in Federal Parliament, Provincial Assemblys and Local level takes place.

=== December ===
- December 1 - 2019 South Asian Games begins with an inauguration ceremony in Kathmandu.
- December 10 - 2019 South Asian Games concludes.
- December 20 - Winter session of both houses of Parliament begins.

== Deaths ==
- February 27 – Rabindra Adhikari, Minister of Culture, Tourism and Civil Aviation and Member of Parliament (b. 1969)
- March 3 – Bharat Mohan Adhikari, former Deputy Prime Minister (b. 1936)
- August 15 – Madan Mani Dixit, Nepali litterateur (b. 1923)
