= 2014 in Nepal =

- Decades: 1990s; 2000s; 2010s; 2020s
- See also: Other events of 2014; Timeline of Nepalese history

The following lists events that happened during 2014 in Nepal.

Pagal

== Incumbents ==
- President: Ram Baran Yadav
- Prime Minister: Khil Raj Regmi (acting) (until 11 February), Sushil Koirala (starting 11 February)
- Vice President: Parmanand Jha
- Chief Justice:
  - Until 26 February: Khil Raj Regmi
  - 11 February-11 April: Damodar Prasad Sharma
  - 11 April-9 October: Ram Kumar Prasad Shah
  - Starting 10 October: Kalyan Shrestha

== Events ==
- October - A bus goes off a mountain road in western Nepal, killing 29 passengers.

== Deaths ==
- Shree Krishna Shrestha, actor
- Alok Nembang, film director
- Dharmaraj Thapa, folk singer and poet
