= 2020 in Nepal =

- Decades: 2000s; 2010s; 2020s
- See also: Other events of 2020; Timeline of Nepalese history

Events in the year 2020 in Nepal.

== Incumbents ==
- President : Bidhya Devi Bhandari
- Vice President : Nanda Kishor Pun
- Prime Minister : Khadga Prasad Oli
- Chief Justice : Cholendra Shumsher Rana
- Speaker of House of Representatives :
- Chairman of National Assembly : Ganesh Prasad Timilsina

=== Provincial Governors ===
- Governor of Bagmati Province: Bishnu Prasad Prasain
- Governor of Gandaki Province: Amik Sherchan
- Governor of Karnali Province: Govinda Prasad Kalauni
- Governor of Koshi Province: Somnath Adhikari
- Governor of Lumbini Province: Dharmanath Yadav
- Governor of Madhesh Province: Tilak Pariyar
- Governor of Sudurpashchim Province: Sharmila Kumari Panta

== Events ==
=== January ===
- January 1 - Visit Nepal 2020 officially begins with an inauguration program at Dasarath Rangasala.
- January 21 - 8 Indian tourists die as a result of Carbon Monoxide poisoning at a resort in Daman, Makwanpur.
- January 23 - Elections for 18 Class I seats in the National Assembly takes place.
- January 24 - The first case of COVID-19 in Nepal is confirmed by the health ministry.

=== February ===
- February 5 - Commission for the Investigation of Abuse of Authority files corruption case in Special Court against 175 persons, including 3 former ministers, for their involvement in illegally privatizing government land of Lalita Niwas, Baluwatar.
- February 12 - Thakur Prasad Gyawaly becomes the Inspector General of Nepal Police following the retirement of Sarbendra Khanal.
- February 20 - Government spokesperson and Minister Gokul Prasad Baskota resigns after an audio tape arranging kickbacks in procurement of secure printing press from KBA-NotaSys SA.
- February 29 - Visit Nepal 2020 campaign is suspended due to the COVID-19 outbreak.

=== March ===
- March 15 - A meeting is held between the high level committee for prevention and control of coronavirus and all seven provincial chief ministers to discuss the ongoing pandemic.
- March 20 - Prime Minister Oli addresses the nation regarding the ongoing coronavirus pandemic. All international flights are stopped from March 22 to March 31.
- March 24 - Nationwide lock-down to stop the spread of COVID-19 begins.

=== April ===
- April 6 - Fifth session of Federal Parliament ends.
- April 13 - Nepali New Year, Bikram Sambat 2077 begins.
- April 21 - Two ordinances amending Constitutional Council (Functions, Duties, Powers and Procedures) Act, 2066 and Political Parties Act, 2073 are endorsed.
- April 22 - Samajbadi Party, Nepal and Rastriya Janata Party Nepal announce a merger to form People's Socialist Party, Nepal as a response to the April 21st ordinance. Breakaway factions in Samajbadi Party, Nepal under the leadership of Renu Yadav were maneuvering to split the party as per the new provisions in Political Parties Act, 2073.
- April 24 - Two ordinances passed on April 21 are repealed by the President following the recommendation of the Council of Ministers. The endorsement of the ordinances were criticized both within the ruling party and other opposition parties.

=== May ===
- May 7 - The number of total COVID-19 infections exceeds 100.
- May 8 - Sixth session of Federal Parliament begins.
- May 11 - The government calls on the Indian ambassador to convey its position and hand over a diplomatic note following the inauguration of a road to link with China at Lipulekh pass which lies in the disputed region of Kalapani.
- May 16 - Ministry of Health and Population confirms the first death from COVID-19 in the country; the deceased 29-year-old woman had recently given birth on May 6 at Teaching Hospital, Kathmandu.
- May 18 - Cabinet approves a new official map of the country which extends the north-western boundary up to Limpiyadhura adding 335 square kilometres in area to the existing map.
- May 23 - 6 people are killed in Chaurjahari, Western Rukum after a mob attacks Nawaraj BK and his friends, who had allegedly come to take BK's 17-year-old girlfriend for marriage.
- May 28
  - The number of total COVID-19 infections crosses 1000.
  - Finance Minister Yuba Raj Khatiwada presents the federal budget of NRs. 1.47 trillion for Fiscal Year 2020/21 to a joint sitting of both houses of parliament.

=== June ===
- June 18 - The second amendment to the Constitution of Nepal is authenticated by the President after unanimous approval in the National Assembly.
- June 21 - Solar Eclipse is visible from all parts of the country.
- June 23 - The number of total COVID-19 infections crosses 10,000.
- June 27 - Locusts are reported to have entered into the country. See: 2019–20 locust infestation

=== July ===
- July 2 - The President abruptly prorogues the sixth session of Federal Parliament on the basis of the recommendation of the government.
- July 9 - 2 people are dead and 21 missing after landslides in Bahrabise and Bhotekoshi.
- July 10–14 - 60 dead and 41 missing after floods in Western Nepal.
- July 22 - Nationwide lockdown ends.
- July 27 - Outbreak of lumpy skin disease is confirmed and declared.

=== August ===
- August 15 - Ministry of Health and Population confirms the hundredth death from COVID-19 in the country.
- August 18 - Daily cases of COVID-19 exceeds 1000.

=== September ===
- September 13 - Kul Man Ghising completes his four-year term as Managing Director of Nepal Electricity Authority, having successfully eliminated Load shedding from the entire country during his tenure.

=== October ===
- October 3 - Three key advisors and private secretary to Prime Minister Oli test positive for COVID-19. More than 60 security personnel in the Prime ministerial residence also test positive for COVID-19.
- October 4 - Provincial Assembly pass a resolution to name Province No. 5 as Lumbini with Deukhuri as its capital.

=== November ===
- November 4 - Ministry of Health and Population confirms the one thousandth death from COVID-19 in the country.

=== December ===
- December 20 - President dissolves the House of Representatives on the recommendation of the Cabinet. Seven ministers resign in protest.
- December 22 - Parallel central committee meetings of Nepal Communist Party (NCP) takes place.

== Deaths ==
- January 17 – Khagendra Thapa Magar
- February 5 – Durganath Sharma, Television journalist
- May 1 – Ranu Devi Adhikari, Singer
- May 28 – Ratna Shumsher Thapa, Lyricist
- June 14 – Raj Kumar Sharma, Chairman of Pratappur Rural Municipality
- June 16 – Nima Dorjee Sherpa, Chairman of Khumbu Pasanglhamu Rural Municipality
- June 20 – Angur Baba Joshi, Social activist and educator
- August 18 – Madhav Prasad Ghimire, Poet
- September 21 – Ang Rita Sherpa, Mountaineer
