= 2018 in Nepal =

- Decades: 1990s; 2000s; 2010s; 2020s
- See also: Other events of 2018; Timeline of Nepalese history

Events in the year 2018 in Nepal.

== Incumbents ==
- President : Bidhya Devi Bhandari
- Vice President : Nanda Kishor Pun
- Prime Minister : Sher Bahadur Deuba (until February 15), Khadga Prasad Oli (from February 15)
- Chief Justice : Gopal Prasad Parajuli (until March 14), Om Prakash Mishra (from August 5)
- Chairman of National Assembly : Ganesh Prasad Timilsina (from March 15)
- Speaker of House of Representatives : Krishna Bahadur Mahara (from March 10)

== Events ==
=== January ===
- January 8 - Govinda K.C. is arrested for contempt of court after he began his 14th hunger-strike demanding resignation of Chief Justice Gopal Prasad Parajuli.
- January 10 - The Supreme Court releases Govinda K.C. from custody without bail and decides to procure copies of Chief Justice Gopal Prasad Parajuli's two citizenship certificates, Judicial Council's decision on his age controversy and copies of his academic certificates.

=== February ===
- February 8 - National Assembly elections takes place.
- February 14 - Nepal beats Canada by 1 wicket to secure a spot in 2018 Cricket World Cup Qualifier.
- February 15 - Deuba resigns as Prime Minister and Oli is sworn in along with 2 ministers.
- February 26 - Oli expands cabinet with 4 more ministers.

=== March ===
- March 4 - Members of the Federal Parliament are sworn in.
- March 12 - US-Bangla Airlines Flight 211, carrying 67 passengers and 4 crew crashes during landing at Kathmandu killing 51 on board.
- March 13 - Bidhya Devi Bhandari is reelected as President.
- March 14 - Chief Justice Gopal Prasad Parajuli is removed from office by Judicial Council citing he should have retired on 21 August 2017 citing age bar but administers oath of office to newly elected President.
- March 15
  - Gopal Prasad Parajuli announces his resignation to the President even after being removed from the position.
  - The national cricket team gains One Day International status after beating Papua New Guinea in the 2018 Cricket World Cup Qualifier.
- March 16 - Oli expands cabinet with 15 more ministers and state ministers, bringing the cabinet to 22 members.

=== April ===
- April 6 - Prime Minister Oli embarks on a state visit to India.
- April 11 - Sarbendra Khanal becomes Inspector General of Nepal Police following the retirement of Prakash Aryal.
- April 14 - Beginning of Bikram Sambat 2075.
- April 22 - Retired Deputy Inspector General of Nepal Police Govinda Niraula, who was the former in charge of police in Tribhuvan International Airport, is arrested in connection with the 33 kg gold smuggling case.

=== May ===
- May 2 - Senior Superintendent of Nepal Police Divesh Lohani is arrested in connection with the 33 kg gold smuggling case.
- May 6 - Budget session of Federal Parliament begins.
- May 11 - Indian Prime Minister Narendra Modi arrives on a two-day visit.
- May 13
  - Nepal Electricity Authority declares the nation load shedding free.
  - 8 Nepalis make the first Everest summits for this climbing season as part of the rope fixing team.
- May 16
  - Makalu Air Cessna 208B Grand Caravan operating a cargo flight crashes in Humla killing 2 crew members.
  - Kami Rita Sherpa scales Mount Everest for a record 22 times.
- May 22 - Chudamani Upreti alias Gore is arrested in connection with the 33 kg gold smuggling case and the murder of Sanam Shakya.
- May 29 - Finance Minister Yuba Raj Khatiwada presented the federal budget of Fiscal Year 2018/19 in a joint sitting of both houses of the Federal Parliament.
- May 31 - Senior Superintendent of Nepal Police Shyam Khatri surrenders himself to Morang District Court in connection with the 33 kg gold smuggling case.

=== June ===
- June 19 - Prime Minister Oli embarks on a 6-day official visit to the People's Republic of China.

=== July ===
- July 6 - Provincial lawmakers pass a resolution to name Province No. 4 as Gandaki.
- July 24 - Law Minister Sher Bahadur Tamang resigns after making controversial remarks regarding female medical students in Bangladesh.
- July 27 - Thirteen year old Nirmala Pant is raped and murdered in Bhimdatta, Kanchanpur leading to nationwide protests.

=== August ===
- August 30–31 - The fourth summit of BIMSTEC takes place in Kathmandu.

=== September ===
- September 8 - Altitude Air helicopter crashes in Dhading killing 6 of the 7 people on board.
- September 9 - Purna Chandra Thapa becomes the new Chief of Army Staff of Nepal Army following the retirement of Rajendra Chhetri.
- September 27 - Budget session of Federal Parliament ends.
- September 28 - Provincial lawmakers pass a resolution to name Province No. 7 as Sudurpashchim.

=== October ===
- October 13 - Five South Korean climbers and four Nepali guides die after their camp is hit by an avalanche air blast. They were planning to ascent the south face of Gurja Himal.
- October 25 - Superintendent Dilli Raj Bista and Inspector Jagdish Bhatta of Nepal Police are removed from service due to their roles in the mishandling of the Nirmala Pant rape and murder case.

=== November ===
- November 2 - Physical Infrastructure and Development Minister of Province no.3 Keshav Sthapit is removed from his post after allegations of sexual assaults and alleged misbehaviour with Chief Minister Dormani Poudel.
- November 6–10 people are killed after a vehicle falls into Bheri in Dolpa.
- November 22 - 18 people are killed in a bus accident in Dadeldhura.

=== December ===
- December 7 - Commission for the Investigation of Abuse of Authority files charges against 21 people, including former minister Bikram Pandey, accusing them of corruption on Sikta Irrigation Project.
- December 9–10 - The first Inter province council meeting takes place in Kathmandu.
- December 14 - A truck accident in Dupcheshwar Rural Municipality, Nuwakot kills 20 people.
- December 20 - Commission for the Investigation of Abuse of Authority files charges against 3 people, including former governor of Nepal Rastra Bank Tilak Rawal, accusing them of corruption during the printing of polymer notes.
- December 21 - A bus accident in Tulsipur, Dang kills 23 people. The victims were schoolchildren and teachers returning from a field trip.
- December 26 - Winter session of Federal Parliament begins.

== Deaths ==
- January 26 – Elizabeth Hawley, journalist and Himalayan expedition historian
- March 6 – Indra Bahadur Rai, writer and literary critic
- June 18 – Upendra Devkota, neurosurgeon and former Minister of Health, Science and Technology
- July 17 – Tara Subba, Mayor of Dharan
- August 10 – Bharat Shumsher, opposition leader in Nepal's first parliament
- November 4 – Padma Ratna Tuladhar, politician and human rights activist
- December 18 – Tulsi Giri, former Prime Minister
- December 28 – Buddhi Krishna Lamichhame, folk singer
