= 2017 in Nepal =

- Decades: 1990s; 2000s; 2010s; 2020s
- See also: Other events of 2017; Timeline of Nepalese history

Events in the year 2017 in Nepal.

== Incumbents ==
- President: Bidhya Devi Bhandari
- Vice President: Nanda Kishor Pun
- Prime Minister: previously Pushpa Kamal Dahal and currently Sher Bahadur Deuba
- Chief Justice: Sushila Karki (until 9 June), Gopal Prasad Parajauli (starting 9 June)

== Events ==
=== May ===
- May 14 - First phase of Local elections.
- May 27 - Summit Air Flight 409 crashes on final approach at Lukla Airport.

=== June ===
- June 28 - Second phase of Local elections.

=== August ===
- August 7/8 - Partial Lunar eclipse visible from entire Nepal.
- August 10–14 - Monsoon Floods lead to death of about 150 people in southern districts of Nepal.

=== September ===
- September 18 - Third phase of Local elections.

=== October ===
- October 14 - Tenure of Legislature Parliament ends.

=== November ===
- November 26 – First round of the legislative election.

=== December ===
- December 7 – Second round of the legislative election

== Deaths ==
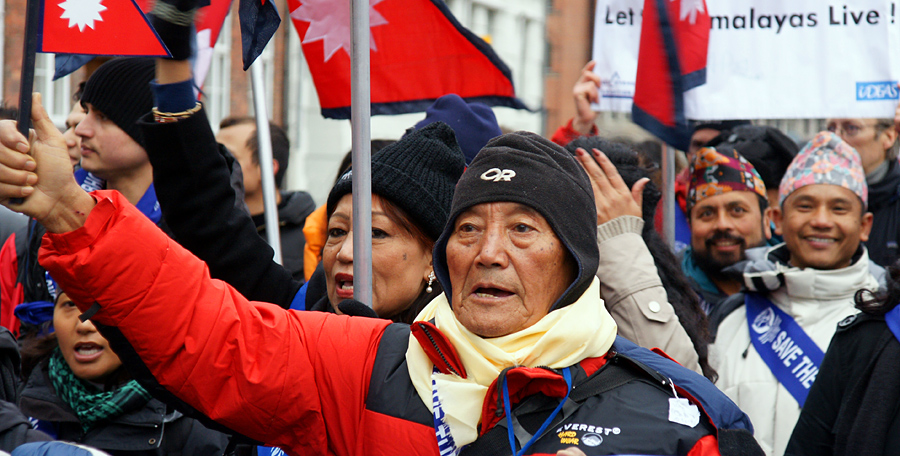
Min Bahadur Sherchan

- 14 January – Yama Buddha, rapper (b. 1987).
- 6 May – Min Bahadur Sherchan, mountaineer (b. 1931)
- 6 May – Marshall Julum Shakya, politician (b. 1939)
- 14 July – Ram Hari Joshi, former minister and founding member of Nepali Congress (b. 1928)
- 11 November – Kirti Nidhi Bista, 25th Prime Minister of Nepal (b. 1927)
