= Bibliography of Nepal =

This is a bibliography of notable works about Nepal.

== History ==
- Pradhan, Kumar (1991). The Gorkha Conquests: The Process and Consequences of the Unification of Nepal, with Particular Reference to Eastern Nepal. Oxford University Press. ISBN 978-0-19-562723-7.
- Whelpton, John (17 February 2005). A History of Nepal. Cambridge University Press. ISBN 978-0-521-80470-7.
- Jha, Prashant (2014). Battles of the New Republic: A Contemporary History of Nepal. Oxford University Press. ISBN 978-1-84904-459-2.
- Shrestha, Nanda R. (8 February 2017). Historical Dictionary of Nepal. Rowman & Littlefield. ISBN 978-1-4422-7770-0.
- Gregson, Jonathan (5 June 2002). Massacre at the Palace: The Doomed Royal Dynasty of Nepal. Miamax. ISBN 978-0-7868-6878-0.
- Thapa, Deepak; Sijapati, Bandita (2004). A Kingdom Under Siege: Nepal's Maoist Insurgency, 1996 to 2004. Bloomsbury Academic. ISBN 978-1-84277-570-7.
- Sharma, Sudheer (24 October 2019). The Nepal Nexus: An Inside Account of the Maoists, the Durbar and New Delhi. Penguin Random House India Private Limited. ISBN 978-93-5305-662-9.
- Adhikary, Surya Mani (1997). The Khaśa Kingdom: A Trans-Himalayan Empire of the Middle Age. Nirala Publications. ISBN 978-81-85693-50-7.

== Biography ==
- Bhaṭṭa, Motīrāma (1986). The Life of Bhanubhakta Acharya. Nepali Sahitya Sammelan.
- Vaidya, Tulasī Rāma (1993). Prithvinarayan Shah, the Founder of Modern Nepal. Anmol Publications. ISBN 978-81-7041-701-9.
- Hamal, Lakshman B. (1995). Military History of Nepal. Sharda Pustak Mandir.
- Pradhan, K. L. (2012). Thapa Politics in Nepal: With Special Reference to Bhim Sen Thapa, 1806–1839. Concept Publishing Company. ISBN 978-81-8069-813-2.
- Prasāī, Narendrarāja (2003). The Glory of Nepal: A Biography of Lain Singh Bangdel. Ekta Prakashan. ISBN 978-99933-1-290-1.
- Parmanand (2008). G.P. Koirala's Struggle for Democracy in Nepal: A Biography. Bright Scholars Publications. ISBN 978-0-9809285-0-1.
- Krishnamurti, Y. G. (1969). His Majesty King Mahendra Bir Bikram Shaha Deva: An Analytical Biography. Nityanand Society.
- Gripper, Ali (27 June 2018). The Barefoot Surgeon: The inspirational story of Dr Sanduk Ruit, the eye surgeon giving sight and hope to the world's poor. Allen & Unwin. ISBN 978-1-76063-635-7.
- Chaudhary, Binod K. (2 May 2016). Making It Big: The Inspiring Story of Nepal’s First Billionaire in His Own Words. Penguin UK. ISBN 978-93-85890-99-4.
- Shakya, Rashmila (2007). From Goddess to Mortal: The True-life Story of a Former Royal Kumari. Vajra Publications. ISBN 978-99946-788-0-8.
- Gautam, Kul Chandra (7 August 2018). Global Citizen from Gulmi: My Journey from the Hills of Nepal to the Halls of United Nations. Publication Nepalaya. ISBN 978-9937-9212-5-1.

== Travelogues ==
- Dhakal, Prateek (14 November 2017). Beyond the Himalayas: A Travelogue of Dolpo and Mustang of Nepal. iUniverse. ISBN 978-1-5320-3482-4.
- LeBlanc, Linda J. (2006). Beyond the Summit. Linda LeBlanc. ISBN 978-0-9785353-0-8.
- Stevenson, Andrew (11 December 2014). Annapurna Circuit: Himalayan Journey. Little, Brown Book Group. ISBN 978-1-4721-1610-9.
- Roberts, Fiona (26 October 2012). A Beard in Nepal. John Hunt Publishing. ISBN 978-1-78099-674-5.
- Planet, Lonely; Mayhew, Bradley; Brown, Lindsay; Butler, Stuart (1 January 2016). Lonely Planet Trekking in the Nepal Himalaya. Lonely Planet. ISBN 978-1-76034-005-6.
- Verlag, Nelles (1995). Nepal. Nelles Verlag. ISBN 978-3-88618-046-2.

== Biodiversity ==
- Bhuju, Ukesh Raj (2007). Nepal Biodiversity Resource Book: Protected Areas, Ramsar Sites, and World Heritage Sites. International Centre for Integrated Mountain Development. ISBN 978-92-9115-033-5.
- Kindlmann, Pavel (18 September 2011). Himalayan Biodiversity in the Changing World. Springer Science & Business Media. ISBN 978-94-007-1802-9.
- Shrestha, K. K.; Bhattarai, S.; Bhandari, P. (1 January 2018). Handbook of Flowering Plants of Nepal (Vol. 1 Gymnosperms and Angiosperms: Cycadaceae - Betulaceae). Scientific Publishers. ISBN 978-93-87991-73-6.
- Sthapit, Bhuwon Ratna (2005). On Farm Conservation of Agricultural Biodiversity in Nepal: Managing diversity and promoting its benefits. Bioversity International. ISBN 978-92-9043-696-6.

== See also ==
- History of Nepal
