= 2007 in Nepal =

- Decades: 1980s; 1990s; 2000s; 2010s; 2020s
- See also: Other events of 2007; Timeline of Nepalese history

Events from the year 2007 in Nepal.

== Incumbents ==
- Monarch: Gyanendra
- Prime Minister: Girija Prasad Koirala
- Chief Justice: Dilip Kumar Poudel (until 8 September), Kedar Prasad Giri (starting 5 October)

== Events ==
- Nepal became a federal republic.

== See also ==
- Years in India
- Years in China
