= 2006 in Nepal =

- Decades: 1980s; 1990s; 2000s; 2010s; 2020s
- See also: Other events of 2006; Timeline of Nepalese history

Events from the year 2006 in Nepal.

== Incumbents ==
- Monarch: Gyanendra
- Prime Minister: Girija Prasad Koirala (starting 25 April)
- Chief Justice: Dilip Kumar Poudel

== Events ==
- April 24 - King Gyanendra reinstates the House of Representatives.
- September 23 - A Shree Air Mil Mi-8 helicopter crashes in Ghunsa, Taplejung killing 24 on board including prominent conservationists.
- November 26 - Prime Minister Girija Prasad Koirala and Maoist Chairman Pushpa Kamal Dahal sign the Comprehensive Peace Accord.

== Deaths ==
- January 23 - Tara Devi, singer
- August 3 - Ali Miyan, folk poet and songwriter
- September 23 - Chandra Gurung and Harka Gurung

== See also ==
- 2006 democracy movement in Nepal
