= Racemandu =

- Category: Motorcycle sport
- Region: National
- Inaugural season: 2012

Racemandu 2017
- Constructors: Yamaha
- Riders' champion: Sampurna Bhatt
- Constructors' champion: Yamaha

Racemandu 2013
- Constructors: Yamaha, Honda
- Riders' champion: Samar Manandhar
- Constructors' champion: Honda

Racemandu is a motorcycle racing event in Nepal. It is organized by Nepal Automobile Sports Association (NASA). It first was organized in 2012 May 28. Although some other races have already taken place, Racemandu is acclaimed as Nepal's first legal race organized under provision of Federation de Motorcyclism (FIM).

It is Nepal’s First Open Championship.

Racemandu is a portmanteau of "race" and "Kathmandu".

Racemandu was held at Satdobato Swimming Complex for the first time. It was satisfactory but it motivated many Nepalese riders and communities. The first series was sponsored by Honda but bikes from other companies like Bajaj, Yamaha, Ktm, Kawasaki, and Hyosung participated in the race ranging from 150cc to 250cc. The chief guest of the programme was sports minister Yuvraj Lama and A.I.G Bhishma Prasai. It was organized in order to promote motor sports tourism in Nepal.

== History ==
There are no official statements about who the main organizers are, but there are many internal sources of information and it is really controversial. Racemandu started as an illegal street race. It was organized massively with much popularity among teenage riders. The race was organized by a young student from Malpi College who was already approached by NASA before the race day and after the publicity of the illegal race. Immediately after his illegal race he came to NASA and started to work for it. The Chief of the course was Mr. Sitaram Neupane. He has claimed that he has successfully completed Racemandu series 2, 3, and 4. Likewise crossmandu is another race conducted in Nepal by NASA. Basically Crossmandu is MOTO CROSS RACE. So far NASA has conducted three series of Crossmandu National Championship. In year 2018 Crossmandu was conducted in Himalayan Motorland, Dhulikhel and the main Person as COC (Clerk of the course) was Mr. Sitaram Neupane, now he has been holding the president-ship in Nepal Motorcycle Federation (NMF) as well.
