= 1951 in Nepal =

- Decades: 1930s; 1940s; 1950s; 1960s; 1970s
- See also: Other events of 1951 · Timeline of Nepalese history

The following events occurred in Nepal in the year 1951.

== Incumbents ==
- Monarch: Gyanendra (1950-7 January 1951) and Tribhuvan (7 January)
- Prime Minister: Mohan Shumsher Jung Bahadur Rana (1948-12 November 1951) and Matrika Prasad Koirala (16 November)

== Events ==
- November – 1951 Nepalese revolution begins.
- 10 November – King Tribhuvan and his family go to New Delhi.

== Births ==
- 18 February – Komal Rajya Lakshmi Devi Shah
- 27 June – Madan Bhandari
