= Lumpy skin disease outbreak in Nepal =

The first outbreak of lumpy skin disease in Nepal had started by June 2020. The first case was confirmed and declared on 27 July. As of July 2023, the disease had spread to all 77 districts, more than a million cattle had been infected and more than 48,000 of them had died. Economic losses among the farming community was high, resulting from cattle deaths, decrease in milk production which is often permanent in dairy cattle, and loss of oxen used for ploughing. The growth of agricultural sector as a whole is expected to slow down due in part to the severity of the outbreak.
