= Altitude Air =

Nepalese helicopter airline

Altitude Air Pvt. Ltd.
IATA	ICAO	Call sign
—	—	—
- Founded: 2016; 10 years ago
- AOC #: 085/2016
- Hubs: Tribhuvan International Airport
- Fleet size: 2
- Headquarters: Sinamangal, Kathmandu, Nepal
- Key people: Nima Nuru Sherpa (Executive Chairman/ Accountable Manager)
- Website: altitudeairnepal.com

Altitude Air Pvt. Ltd is a charter helicopter airline based in Tribhuvan International Airport and Sinamangal, Kathmandu. The company began operations in 2016 and mainly carries out rescue and charter flights.They are currently banned from flying in EU airspace.

== History ==
Altitude Air was founded in 2016 in Kathmandu, Nepal, by various Nepalese tourism entrepreneurs. It ran its test flight on the 27th of September and currently operates two Airbus H-125 helicopters. In 2024, Altitude Air successfully retrieved the bodies of five deceased Russian climbers at 7000 meters, after numerous other companies were unable to do so. As of 2026 they offer services in tourism, cargo, search and rescue, and medical flights.

== Fleet ==
Altitude Air gained attention initially, as the first airline company in Nepal to purchase brand-new commercial aircraft, unlike other helicopter companies that operate second-hand crafts. The Altitude fleet consists of the following aircraft (as of 2025):

Altitude Air fleet
Aircraft	In fleet	Orders	Passengers			Notes
Aircraft	In fleet	Orders	C	Y	Total	Notes
Eurocopter AS350 B3e	2	1	0	5	5	
