= 1959 in Nepal =

- Decades: 1930s; 1940s; 1950s; 1960s; 1970s
- See also: Other events of 1959 · Timeline of Nepalese history

The following lists events that happened during 1959 in the Kingdom of Nepal.

== Incumbents ==
- Monarch: Mahendra
- Prime Minister: Subarna Shamsher Rana (until 27 May), Bishweshwar Prasad Koirala (starting 27 May)
- Chief Justice: Anirudra Prasad Singh (until 29 June)

== Events ==
=== February ===
- February 18 - Elections were held in Nepal for the first time its history, as voters chose candidates for 18 of the 109 lower house seats, with the remainder to be chosen on eight other days.
