= Uma Singh =

Nepali journalist

- Born: ca. 1983; Siraha District, Gamahariya VDC, Maheshpur Ward 4
- Died: January 11, 2009 (age 26); Dhanusha, Janakpur Zone, Nepal
- Cause of death: stabbing
- Occupations: Print & radio journalist
- Employer(s): Janakpur Today newspaper & Radio Today FM
- Known for: Woman's activist
- Style: Local news

Uma Singh (Nepali: उमा सिंह; c. 1983 – January 11, 2009) was a Nepalese women's rights journalist who worked for the Janakpur Today newspaper and Radio Today FM radio station. She lived in Janakpur, Nepal, until she was murdered for her feminist journalism. According to BBC News, Singh was the first female journalist to be killed in Nepal.

== Biography ==
Singh was born in the Siraha District, Gamahariya VDC, Maheshput Ward 4. She is survived by her mother, Sushila Devi Singh. Singh was cremated by her nephew, who worked in Janakpur.

Uma Singh was a reporter for the Janakpur Today daily newspaper and Radio Today FM, both owned by the same company. She gained recognition for her articles criticizing the dowry system, inheritance practices favoring sons-in-law over daughters, and other issues in her native Nepal. In addition to domestic issues, she also advocated for women's rights, addressed the caste system, and engaged in political discourse. Her workplace was located in her hometown which considered unsafe, with people carrying weapons at all times. Singh's supervisor at the radio station described her as "very brave and multi-talented" (Brij Kumar Yadav).

== Death ==
Janakpur is located in Nepal and shown relative to the capital Kathmandu.

Singh was murdered in her home in Janakpur, Nepal, where she lived by herself in a rented apartment. On January 11, 2009, she came home from work in the evening and was making dinner when 12-20 people entered her apartment and stabbed her with sharp objects. Singh sustained multiple stab wounds and died on the way to the hospital. There were no witnesses of the murder. Her killers were Lalita Devi Singh, Nemlal Paswan, Shraban Yadav, Bimlesh Jha, and Abhishek Singh. Lalita Singh was Uma Singh's sister-in-law. Pawswan and Abhishek Singh were known for their criminal records. Yadav was a district-level activist of the UCPN(M), and Jha was a party activist of the Terai Ekta Parishad. Lalita Singh, Yadav, and Nemlal Paswasn were sentenced to life in prison.

=== Investigation ===
The police conducted an investigation on Singh's death for possible linkage to the disappearance of Singh's father and brother in 2007. They suspected the same perpetrators might be behind Singh's death. After Singh's father and brother disappeared, Singh moved to Janakpur and started her job at the daily newspaper and the local FM station. Five days before Singh was murdered, she wrote, "The Maoists have not returned the seized land in Siraha district even three months after Maoist chairman and Prime Minister Pushpa Kamal Dahal directed his party cadres to do so. Some 1,200 bigahas of land captured during the People's War is still under Maoist control." The investigation concluded that the killers of Singh were after the family land that Singh had the titles to. A life sentence was handed down to the ring leader. Umesh Yadav, also known as Swamiji, who was arrested by police was convicted of being the mastermind of the killing. Yadav was sentenced to life imprisonment by the District Court of Dhanusa in April 2015. Uma's sister-in-law Lalita Devi Singh and Nemwal Paswan had been sentenced already for the same crime.

== Context ==
Police officers had disregarded Singh's work as a journalist as a possible motive for her murder. Before Singh was killed, she told the UN Mission in Nepal, "It is a big problem working in the Terai region." She talked about how society does not accept women. The Editor-in-Chief of Singh's newspaper attributed her killing to her criticism of local politicians and the dowry system.

== Impact ==
After Singh's death, a woman by the name of Manika Jha received death threats. The assailants broke her windows and marked her door with a cross with the words, "now it is your turn." Jha was a correspondent for the Kantipur Daily. Many death threats were issued. Shanker Mishra, leader of Terai Madhesh Loktantik Party issued a threat to Mahesh Kumar Das, a reporter for Nagarik Dainik and news coordinator for Radio Mirchi FM 89.6.

Singh was the first journalist murdered in Nepal. She was well known for her activism in Nepal. Singh was a women's rights activist and a print and broadcast journalist.

People in the Mahottari, Salahi, Sindhuli, Siraha, and Sapatari zones mourned Singh's death and wore black bands around their wrists to protest her killing. The Monday after Singh's death, all six FM radio stations in Janakpur did not air an entertainment program or news.

After the mourning for Singh, many people of Nepal started protesting for journalist protections, in particular, safety for women who advocate for human rights.

After Singh's death, Article 19 stated, "It was emphasized that the lack of effective investigation and culture impunity in Nepal had created a precedent whereby perpetrators see attacks pass without consequence."

Members of the Club Nepal announced they would create an award in memory of Singh. The Uma Singh Courageous Journalism Award would carry a prize of 25,000 Indian Rupee and a letter of appreciation.

== Reactions ==
Koichiro Matsuura, director-general of UNESCO, said, "I condemn the brutal murder of Uma Singh. If Nepal is to uphold the two basic human rights of freedom of expression and equal rights of men and women, it will need to bring the culprits of this crime to justice. This is not only an attack on an individual, but a blow to Nepalese society as a whole."

Reporters Without Borders said, "Our first thoughts are with her family and friends. We ask the authorities to react quickly and to do their utmost to protect journalists in Nepal and to quickly arrest this group of killers. This kind of appalling murder must not go unpunished if the Nepalese press is to go about its work freely."

The Committee to Protect Journalists said it "welcomes the arrest of a suspected mastermind in Uma Singh's murder case as a significant first step. However, only a robust effort by authorities to prosecute and deliver a just verdict will help to reverse deep-rooted impunity for journalist murders in Nepal."

A spokesperson for International Federation of Journalists said, "We welcome the conviction of Umesh Yadav bringing the case of Uma Singh's murder to a close. We applaud the local authorities for continuing to fight for justice for Uma and ensure that the perpetrators and mastermind are brought to justice."
