= 2019 South Asia floods =

2019 flood event

- Date: 12 March - December 2019
- Location: Bangladesh China India Nepal (Sri Lanka) Sri Lanka Afghanistan
- Cause: Heavy monsoon rains
- Deaths: 2,499
- Injuries: 28
- Missing: 70

In mid-March 2019, monsoonal downpours caused widespread flooding and landslides across South Asia.

== Bangladesh ==
Heavy rains battered Bangladesh beginning in early July, with the monthly rainfall in Cox's Bazar reaching 585 mm (23.0 in) by July 14. Hundreds of makeshift tents collapsed in the Kutupalong and Nayapara refugee camps in Cox's Bazar. At least two children drowned in floods and 40,000 families were affected in the camps. Throughout the Chittagong Division, 200 villages flooded, affecting an estimated 500,000 people. Lightning killed at least 12 people, mostly rural farmers, on 13 July. Cyclone Matmo-Bulbul killed around 25 people in November.

== Afghanistan ==
Floods in March killed at least 80 people. The same floods also caused damage in neighbouring Iran. A further 24 people were killed in May., with five more people dying in the next month.

== China ==
Heavy rains in Guilin flooded the city; 300 people required rescue. Door-to-door searches were conducted in Xingping Town.

== India ==
From June to October, over 2,100 people died in floods across India. The country recorded its heaviest rainfall since 1994. In Assam, flooding along the Himalayan border with Nepal killed at least 14 people and affected approximately 1.5 million people. The Brahmaputra River overtopped its banks in numerous locations, flooding 1,800 villages. The Assam State Disaster Management Authority (ASDMA) stated on 16 July 2019, that flooding had affected 32 of the state's 33 districts, affecting 4.496 million people across 4,620 villages. The ASDMA stated that 19 people had died due to the flooding, including two people killed by landslides, and that over 101,000 people had taken refuge at 226 relief camps and 562 relief distribution centre had been established. Over 90% of Kaziranga National Park was flooded, forcing animals to escape to the hills of Karbi Anglong district. Divisional Forest Officer Rohini B. Saikia stated that two one-horned rhinos and one elephant had drowned in the floods. Thirty animals were rescued and taken to the Centre for Wildlife Rehabilitation and Conservation for treatment.

At least six people died in Arunachal.

== Nepal ==
Heavy rains began on 12 July, causing flooding and landslides across Nepal. Rivers quickly eroded embankments and flooded nearby communities, notably along the Karnali, Mohana, Kandra Kanda, and Khutiya rivers. The Koshi river swelled to dangerous levels, threatening the community of Chilaiya. During the overnight of 13–14 July, all 56 gates along the Koshi Barrage were opened, releasing water at 10,505 m^{3} (371,000 ft^{3}) per second. Numerous landslides blocked roads, leaving communities cut off and vehicles stranded. At least 55 people died and 30 others were reported missing. Thirty-three people were treated for injuries. Adverse weather conditions and damaged infrastructure hampered rescue efforts.

At least 1,100 people were rescued and an estimated 10,000 had been displaced from their homes. Nepal police deployed 27,380 personnel nationwide.

== Pakistan ==
From February to April 2019, widespread flash flooding affected large parts of Pakistan, most severely in Balochistan, KPK, Punjab, and other provinces. Pakistan had been hit by three major waves of rain and flooding over the course of more than one month. The first wave of rain began on 20 February, leading to flooding in to Khyber and Balochistan, therefore, many villages and several cities had been evacuated, and more than 1,500 families had been rescued alone in Balochistan and many in other states.

== Sri Lanka ==
September floods in Sri Lanka were caused by heavy torrential rainfalls during September 2019. As of 26 September 2019; the monsoon floods affected 13 districts, killing at least 2 people, injuring 6 others, and about 116,000 people were affected. One casualty was reported in the Galle District and the other one was reported in Kolonnawa, where a teenager drowned in the flood water. About 282 houses were reported to have been damaged, mainly in Galle and Matara, while about 15% of houses were completely destroyed in the two districts. A red alert was issued to areas which were situated near rivers such as Diyawanna Oya, Nilwala Ganga, Kalu Ganga, and Gin Ganga. Several roads in Galle were inundated due to the overflow of rivers. Colombo, Negombo, and Gampaha were also severely affected due to heavy floods.
