= 2020 Rukum massacre =

Caste-based violence in Nepal

Massacre in Soti
- Date: May 23, 2020
- Location: Soti, Chaurjahari, Western Rukum District, Nepal
- Deaths: 6
- Arrests: 34
- Convicted: 26 (24+2)
- Charges: Murder and caste-based discrimination
- Sentence: Life imprisonment (24)+ Caste-based discrimination(2)

On 23 May 2020, six youths were killed in the Rukum district of western Nepal in an incident of caste-related community violence. The bodies of two Dalit men were found in the Bheri River, a major tributary of the Karnali River, on 27th May. The two men were identified as 21-year-old Nawaraj BK and Tika Ram Nepali. Later, four additional bodies were found, those of Ganesh Budha, Lokendra Sunar, Sanju BK, and Govinda Sahi. Following the incident, a detailed police investigation was carried out for two years. According to the Nepali police, when BK and 18 others went to Soti village in Chaurjahari, the villagers allegedly attacked the group and chased them to the river and killed them. Based on the evidence, in 2023, a court sentenced 24 villagers to life imprisonment and another two individuals to two years' imprisonment.

== Incident ==
Nawaraj BK, from the Jajarkot District, went to the Soti village in Rukum District to marry a 17-year-old girl, with her consent. BK went to the village with 18 others on Saturday, 23 May 2020. Upon arriving in the village, they were allegedly attacked and chased by villagers, including Dambar Bahadur Malla, ward chair of Chaurjahari, and the girl's family. The group chased them to the Bheri River and six men jumped into the river to save themselves. According to some villagers, the group was attacked because of their caste; BK was a "lower caste" man trying to marry an "upper caste" girl. Also, the girl's family claims that BK was trying to marry the under-aged girl despite their refusal. BK had been in a relationship with the girl for three years, and wanted to marry her.

On 27 May, the bodies of Nawaraj BK and Tikaram Sunar were found in the Bheri River. Two other bodies, those of Ganesh Budha and Lokendra Sunar, were found later. Bodies of two others, Govinda Shahi and Sanju BK, were found later.

== Reaction ==
Nepal police arrested Dambar Bahadur Malla, ward chair of Chaurjahari, and fifteen others. The United Nations Mission in Nepal called for an unbiased examination of the incident. The National Human Rights Commission issued a press release writing "Soti incident goes against the provision of the right to live with dignity, right to equality as guaranteed by the constitution of Nepal, Caste-based Discrimination and Untouchability (Crime and Punishment) Act, and International Convention on the Elimination of All Forms of Racial Discrimination, 1965 signed by Nepal". The government of Nepal sent five people to investigate within two weeks. By 8th June, police arrested 28 individuals, 20 of whom were murder suspects. A parliamentary committee investigation was also carried out that concluded the incident was related to caste-based discrimination. Following the incident, father of Nabaraj filed a police case against 34 people for their involvement in the murder. The case was officially registered on 14th June at the Rukum District Attorney’s Office. 23 of them were remanded in the custody and one was released on the bail.

In December, 2023 a verdict was given by the West Rukum District Court. The court sentenced 24 convicts to life imprisonment on charge of murder and two other individuals to two years imprisonment and a fine of NPR50,000 on charges of caste-based discrimination. The then Ward chairman Dambar Bahadur Malla and father of the girl were among the imprisoned.
