= Maoist rebel =

The term Maoist rebel could refer to members of the following parties:

- Unified Communist Party of Nepal (Maoist)
- Naxal (disambiguation), communist militants in India
  - Communist Party of India (Maoist)
- New People's Army
