= Bharat Raj Upreti =

Bharat Raj Upreti भरतराज उप्रेती
- Born: July 8, 1950; Sindhupalchowk
- Died: May 24, 2015 (aged 64); Kathmandu
- Citizenship: Nepal

Bharat Raj Upreti (July 8, 1950 – May 24, 2015) was a justice of the Supreme Court of Nepal and a senior advocate.

== Career ==
Bharat Raj Upreti completed his Bachelor in Commerce (B.Com.) and Diploma in Law from Tribhuwan University. In 1980, Upreti obtained the degree of Master of Law (LL.M) from the University of Pune, India. He enrolled as an Advocate by the Supreme Court of Nepal in 1977 (2033 B.S).

Upreti also taught different subjects of commercial and constitutional Law at Tribhuwan University, Faculty of Law for 21 years. He voluntarily retired in February 1995 as an associate professor.

Upreti also served as visiting faculty at Kathmandu University.

The Supreme Court of Nepal awarded the title of senior advocate in 2008 ( 2065 B.S). He was appointed as Ad-Hoc Justice of the Supreme Court on 22 January 2009 (9th, Magh 2065 B.S).

== Death ==
Upreti committed suicide at his residence in Gyaneshwor, Kathmandu on May 24, 2015.
