= May 2019 Kathmandu bombings =

Terrorist incident in Kathmandu, Nepal

2019 Kathmandu bombings
- Location: 27°46′N 85°16′E; Kathmandu, Nepal
- Date: 26 May 2019
- Attack type: bombings, mass murder, terrorism
- Weapon: Bombs
- Deaths: 4
- Injuries: 7
- Perpetrator: Communist Party of Nepal
- Motive: Maoism

On 26 May 2019, three bombs exploded in Kathmandu, Nepal, killing four and injuring seven. The first blast happened in a house in the Ghattekulo residential area killing one. The second blast took place at a hairdresser's premises in Sukedhara, killing three. The third blast went off in the Thankot area of Kathmandu, injuring two.

== Background ==
The Communist Party of Nepal (Biplab) (a splinter group of the former Communist Party of Nepal (Maoist)) under the leadership of Netra Bikram Chand, was engaged in a series of attacks on communication infrastructure. Events escalated after a bombing in Ncell headquarters in Nakkhu, Lalitpur, killed one person and injured two others on 22 February 2019. Following increased criminal activities including the kidnapping of Province Assembly Member Devaki Malla of Bajhang, the cabinet banned all activities of the party in March 2019. This prompted security agencies to arrest people connected to the party nationwide. On May 22, police shot party activist Tirtha Raj Ghimire in Bhojpur who later died en route to a hospital. A general strike was called on May 27 to protest against the killing by the party with improvised explosive devices (IEDs) being planted across the country to enforce the general strike.

== Casualties ==
Location in Kathmandu	Presumed target	Killed	Injured
Ghattekulo	Singha Durbar	Prajwal Shahi	Rabin K.C.
Sukedhara	Nepal Communist Party NCP headquarters	Gopal Thapa Magar, Dipendra B.K., Krishna Bhandari	Hari Khadka, Sunil Maharjan, Jib Kumar Thakur, 1 Unidentified
Thankot	Unknown	None	Mahendra Tamang, Buddha Lama

General Secretary of Communist Party of Nepal Netra Bikram Chand released a statement claiming all 4 deceased as members of his party. All of the dead and injured were a result of accidental explosions during the bomb making process. The blast at Thankot occurred when the IED exploded while being carried on a motorcycle.

== Other incidents ==
Seven people associated with the party were arrested in Koteshwor, Kathmandu with four ready to plant bombs and Maoist literature and pamphlets. Two IEDs planted in Gwarko and Lagankhel were defused by personnel from Nepal Army.

== Responsibility ==
Netra Bikram Chand released a statement on May 27 claiming responsibility in the bombing incidents.
