= Indra Lohani =

Nepalese lawyer and television host

- Born: 17 April 1968; Lakhanpur-8, Jhapa, Nepal
- Died: 16 January 2009 (aged 40); Kathmandu, Nepal
- Education: Nepal Law Campus (2047); National College of Bangalore
- Occupations: Law; Television News Media
- Employers: Nepal Television; Kantipur Television
- Organization: Legal Research Associates
- Known for: Bahas

Indra Lohani (Nepali: इन्द्र लोहनी; 17 April 1968 – 16 January 2009) was a prominent Nepalese lawyer, political talk-show host, and news reporter, mostly known for his television political talk-show Bahas (Nepali word for discussion) aired on Nepal Television and later on Kantipur Television as Kantipur Bahas, until his demise.

== Biography ==
=== Early years ===
Lohani was born in Lakhanpur-8, Rangapur Village of Jhapa district, Nepal to father Sharada Prashad Lohani and mother Harimaya Lohani. He was Sharada Prashad and Harimaya's second child, out of their five children. Known to be an average student, he attended a government school for his secondary education before going to the capital city Kathmandu to join college at Nepal Law Campus with major in law. He later attended National College of Bangalore in Bangalore, India to receive his LLM degree.

=== Career ===
Soon after returning Nepal from Bangalore, he established his legal firm Legal Research Associates in Kathmandu, at the same time attending Nepal Law Campus for further studies. His career as a television personality began when he started doing a political talk-show named Bahas in the national television of Nepal. With his strict professional nature and the habit of straight forward questioning, he soon attracted extreme attention from the viewers who would eagerly wait for him to provoke critical issues, especially while interviewing politicians, in his talk-shows.

During the period of monarchy, before 2006 revolutions, his show in the government-controlled Nepal Television started getting heavily censored due to his straight questions to the politicians in his interviews. This led him to quit the show at Nepal Television, but soon starting the show in a privately controlled television, Kantipur Television, under the name Kantipur Bahas. The show still remained a favorite to its viewers and attracted even more attention after the peoples' revolution of 2006 when people had renewed interests in the country's changing politics. He is also known as a social worker and reformer.

His reports from flood-stricken parts of eastern Nepal, where he also participated in rescue activities together with Nepal Army, are considered as heroic by many. He is known to have made efforts to bring infrastructural development in education and other fields in villages and rural areas of the country. Even after his death his family has been contributing for social and religious causes, which they say is made in Lohani's memory.

=== Personal life ===
Lohani was married to Sushma Dwivedi on 24 April 1999. The couple has two daughters, Samragy Lohani and Suvangy Lohani. The older daughter was 8 and younger was 3 years old when he died. Currently his wife (Sushma Dwivedi) is actively working as a lawyer and mediator whilst also being a single mother to her children. His eldest daughter is studying Chartered Accountacy and the younger is studying fashion designing.

== Death ==
Lohani's demise occurred possibly due to a cardiac arrest, around 8 pm on 16 January 2009. Doctors had reported of no signs of external injuries on Lohani's body. Lohani was suffering from a liver condition medically known as fatty liver and was also a blood pressure patient. Earlier, on the day of his demise, Lohani had complained of discomfort while visiting a temple with his daughter and had fainted for a while. After regaining consciousness, he had asked locals to drop him at home. He died while being rushed from his house to the hospital. He was brought dead at Norvic International Hospital in Kathmandu at 8:10 p.m.

His funeral was attended by thousands of people at the Pashupati Temple Cremation Area.
