= Parmanand Jha =

Vice President of Nepal from 2008 to 2015

- परमानन्द झा
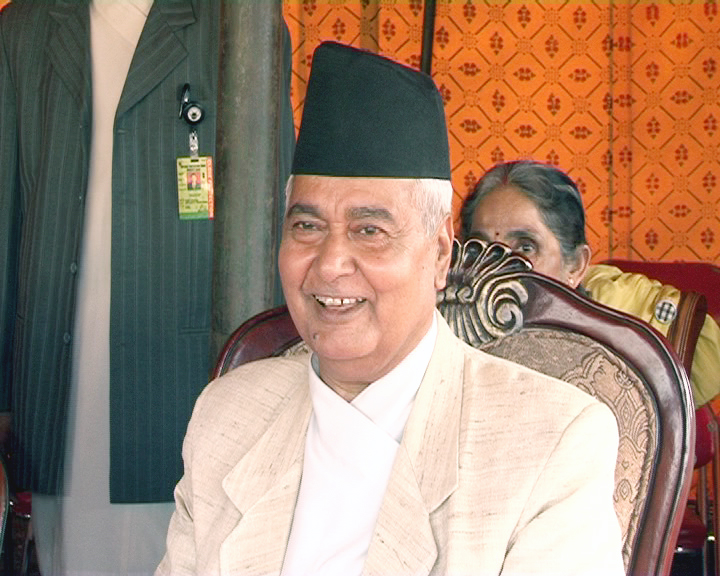
- Jha in 2011

Vice President of Nepal
- In office 23 July 2008 – 31 October 2015
- President: Ram Baran Yadav; Bidya Devi Bhandari
- Preceded by: Position established
- Succeeded by: Nanda Kishor Pun

Personal details
- Born: 1946 (age 79–80) Darbhanga district, Bihar Province, British India
- Party: Madhesi Jana Adhikar Forum

Parmanand Jha (Nepali: परमानन्द झा; born 1946) is a Nepali politician who served as the first vice president of Nepal from 23 July 2008 to 31 October 2015 following his term as a Supreme Court judge.

Jha was born to Nepali parents and brought Bihar in Darbhanga district in the Indian state of Bihar; this took place at his maternal uncle's home, according to Hindu traditions. His father hails from the Mithila region of Nepal, making him a descendant native citizen and federal subject of Nepal. Jha resigned as a judge in December 2007 after he was not proposed by the Judicial Council.. Later, Jha joined political life and became a member of the Madhesi Janadhikar Forum. On 19 July 2008, he was elected as Vice-President of Nepal by the 1st Nepalese Constituent Assembly.

He began his first term of office as Vice-President of Nepal on 23 July 2008 by taking the oath of office from President Ram Baran Yadav at the Sheetal Niwas Presidential Palace in Maithili (despite he intended to take oath in Hindi) in the presence of Prime Minister Girijaprasad Koirala and others.

== Hindi oath controversy ==
Jha's legitimacy as vice-president was challenged for taking the oath of office in Hindi by Nepalis. Jha's mother tongue is Maithili but he is also fluent in Hindi, Bengali, and English.

A written petition was filed by Advocate Balkrishna Neupane at the apex court claiming that the oath was unconstitutional as it was taken in a language not recognized by the interim constitution. After a year long court procedure, the Supreme Court on 24 July 2009 ordered Jha to retake the oath of office and secrecy for the second time "in accordance with the Constitution," ruling that taking oath in Hindi was not constitutional.

However, Jha objected to the Supreme Court verdict, accusing the court of being biased and of conflict of interests. He stated that he would decide whether or not to retake the oath after consulting political parties and the "people he represents," i.e., the Madhesias who principally speak Maithili and Bhojpuri. He demanded changes to the law to ensure that all languages (i.e., Hindi) "are given due respect."

The Supreme Court's deadline for retaking the oath expired on 30 August 2009. As Jha did not swear once again the oath of office, the office was considered to have become vacant from 31 August 2009. In order to maintain political and ethnic inclusiveness, the Nepalese government did not seek a new vice-president but continued to work with Jha towards a compromise, seeking to re-instate him. Changes were made to the law to allow the oath of office to be taken in native ethnic languages, e.g., Jha's native Maithili, and on 7 February 2010, he accordingly took a fresh oath of office as vice-president in the Maithili language.

Political offices
New creation	Vice President of Nepal; 2008–2015	Succeeded by Nanda Kishor Pun
