= Ram Baran Yadav =

President of Nepal from 2008 to 2015

- रामवरण यादव
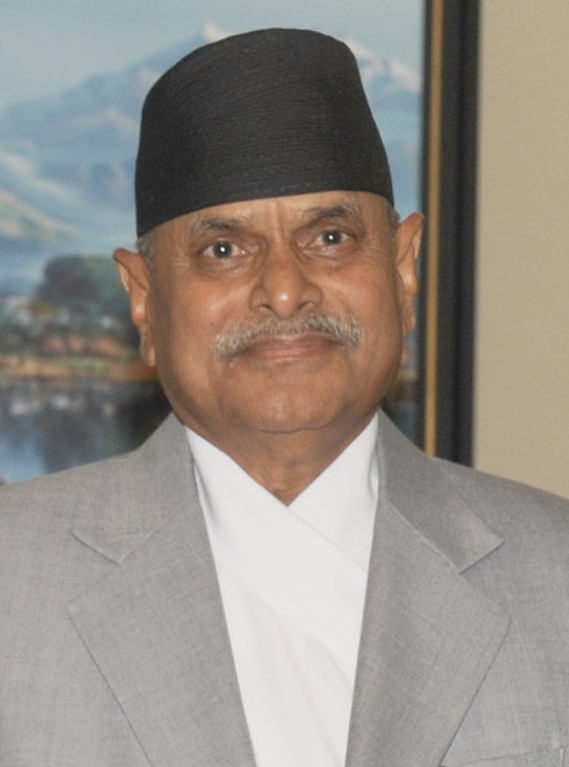
- Yadav in 2014

President of Nepal
- In office 23 July 2008 – 29 October 2015
- Prime Minister: Pushpa Kamal Dahal; Madhav Kumar Nepal; Jhala Nath Khanal; Baburam Bhattarai; Khil Raj Regmi (interim); Sushil Koirala; K. P. Sharma Oli
- Vice President: Parmanand Jha
- Preceded by: Position established (Girija Prasad Koirala as Acting Head of State of Nepal)
- Succeeded by: Bidya Devi Bhandari

General Secretary of the Nepali Congress
- In office 2006–2008 Serving with Bimalendra Nidhi; Kul Bahadur Gurung
- President: Girija Prasad Koirala
- Preceded by: Girija Prasad Koirala
- Succeeded by: Prakash Man Singh; Krishna Prasad Sitaula

Personal details
- Born: 4 February 1948 (age 78) Sapahi, Dhanusha, Nepal
- Party: Nepali Congress (1968–2008)
- Spouse: Julekha Yadav
- Children: Chandra Mohan Yadav; Chandra Shekhar Yadav; Anita Yadav
- Education: PGIMER Chandigarh; Medical College & Hospital, Kolkata

Dr. Ram Baran Yadav (Note: Maithili and Nepali: डा. रामवरण यादव) (born 4 February 1948) is a Nepalese politician and physician who served as the first president of Nepal from 23 July 2008 to 29 October 2015, following the declaration of republic in 2008. Previously, he served as Minister of Health from 1999 to 2001 and general secretary of the Nepali Congress.

== Political life ==
Yadav served as Minister of State for Health from 1991 to 1994. He was elected to the House of Representatives in the 1999 election as a candidate of the Nepali Congress, becoming the Minister of Health in the subsequent government.

In May 2007, Yadav's residence in Janakpur was attacked by militants of the Janatantrik Terai Mukti Morcha (JTMM). The JTMM put up a seizure notice at the house, hoisted their flags at it and detonated a bomb. Yadav contested the Dhanusa-5 constituency in the April 2008 Constituent Assembly election and won the seat, obtaining 10,392 votes.

Yadav was elected as the first President of Nepal in a second round of voting on 21 July 2008. He received 308 out of the 590 votes cast in the 1st Nepalese Constituent Assembly, defeating Ram Raja Prasad Singh, who had been nominated by the Communist Party of Nepal (Maoist), in a second round of voting. Yadav was sworn in as president on 23 July 2008. Chief Justice of Nepal Kedar Prasad Giri administered the oath of office and secrecy to Yadav at Shital Niwas, Rastrapati Bhawan. Yadav also administered oath to Vice-president Parmananda Jha.

Yadav discharged various responsibilities in the Nepali Congress Party. He was a member of the Central Working Committee for 15 years, and also a member of Parliamentary Board, and a member of the Discipline Committee of the Party. Before being elected as president, he was General Secretary of the Nepali Congress Party.

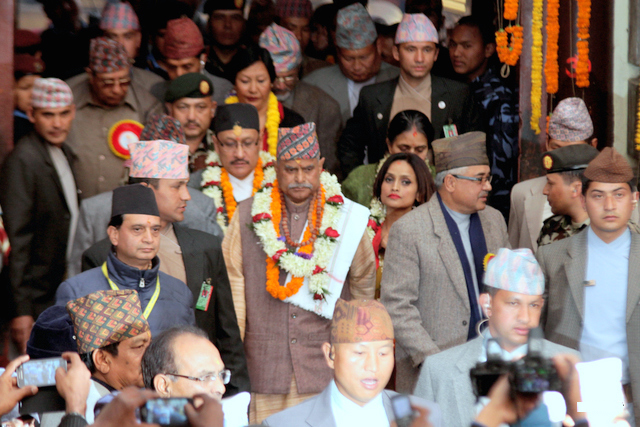
Ram Baran Yadav visiting a temple

== See also ==
- 2008 Nepalese presidential election
- President of Nepal
- List of prime ministers of Nepal

== Notes ==
Party political offices
Preceded by Sahana Pradhan	General Secretary of the Nepali Congress; 2006–2008; Served alongside: Bimalendra Nidhi, Kul Bahadur Gurung	Succeeded by Prakash Man Singh; Krishna Prasad Sitaula
Political offices
Preceded by Girija Prasad Koirala as Acting Head of State	President of Nepal; 2008–2015	Succeeded by Bidhya Devi Bhandari
