= Vice President of Nepal =

Deputy to the Nepalese head of state

Vice President of The Federal of Democratic Republic of Nepal
- Emblem of Nepal

- Flag of Nepal
- Incumbent; Ram Sahaya Yadav since 20 March 2023
- Style: His Excellency
- Type: Deputy to the Head of state
- Appointer: Indirect election
- Term length: Five years
- Inaugural holder: Parmanand Jha
- Formation: 28 May 2008; 18 years ago

The vice president of Nepal (Nepali: नेपालको उपराष्ट्रपति, Nēpālako uparāṣṭrapati) is the deputy to the president of Nepal. The position was created when the Nepalese monarchy was abolished in May 2008. The current vice-president of Nepal is Ram Sahaya Yadav. The vice president is to be formally addressed as 'His Excellency'.

== History ==
Under the interim constitution adopted in January 2007, all powers of governance were removed from the King of Nepal, and the Nepalese Constituent Assembly elected in the 2008 Nepalese Constituent Assembly election was to decide in its first meeting whether to continue the monarchy or to declare a republic. On 28 May 2008 the Assembly had voted to abolish the monarchy.

The Fifth Amendment to the Interim Constitution established that the president, vice-president, prime minister and Constituent Assembly chairman and vice-chairman would all be elected on the basis of a "political understanding". However, if one were not forthcoming, they could be elected by a simple majority.

The first election was the 2008 Nepalese presidential election. The parties failed to agree on candidates for president or vice president, so an election took place. Parmananda Jha of the Madhesi Janadhikar Forum was elected with the support of the Nepali Congress and the Communist Party of Nepal (Unified Marxist-Leninist)

== List of vice presidents ==
List of vice presidents of Nepal from 2008 – till date.
No.	Portrait	Name (Birth–Death)	Took office	Left office	Time in office	Party	Election	President
1		Parmanand Jha (परमानन्द झा) (born 1946)	23 July 2008	31 October 2015	7 years, 100 days	MJF-N	2008; 2011	Ram Baran Yadav
2		Nanda Kishor Pun (नन्दबहादुर पुन) (born 1966)	31 October 2015	20 March 2023	7 years, 140 days	Maoist Centre	2015; 2018	Bidya Devi Bhandari
3		Ram Sahaya Yadav (राम सहाय प्रसाद यादव) (born 1971)	20 March 2023	Incumbent	3 years, 241 days	PSP-Nepal	2023	Ram Chandra Paudel

== See also ==
- President of Nepal
- List of current vice presidents
