= President of Nepal =

Head of state

President of the Federal Democratic Republic of Nepal
- सङ्घीय लोकतान्त्रिक गणतन्त्र नेपालको राष्ट्रपति
- Emblem of Nepal

- Flag of Nepal

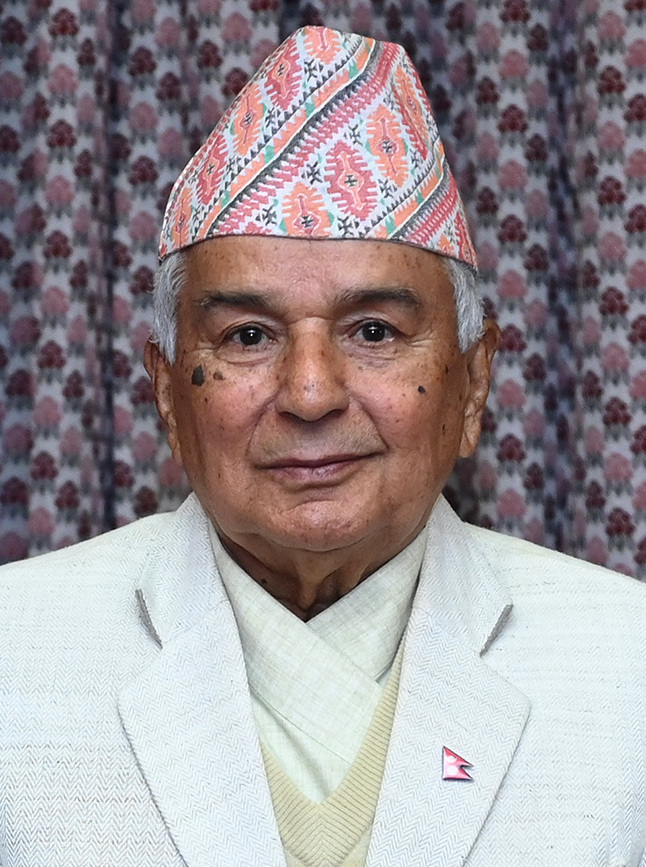
- Incumbent; Ram Chandra Paudel since 13 March 2023
- Government of Nepal; Nepalese Armed Forces
- Style: The Right Honourable; His Excellency
- Type: Head of state Commander-in-chief
- Residence: Shital Niwas
- Appointer: Indirect election
- Term length: Five years, renewable once
- Constituting instrument: Constitution of Nepal (2015)
- Inaugural holder: Ram Baran Yadav
- Formation: 28 May 2008; 18 years ago
- Deputy: Vice President of Nepal
- Salary: रु1,05,015 per month
- Website: Office of the President of Nepal

The president of Nepal (Note: Nepali: नेपालको राष्ट्रपति, romanized: Nepālko Rāṣṭrapati), officially the president of the Federal Democratic Republic of Nepal (Note: Nepali: सङ्घीय लोकतान्त्रिक गणतन्त्र नेपालको राष्ट्रपति, romanized: Saṅghīya Lokatāntrik Gaṇatantra Nepālko Rāṣṭrapati), is the head of state of the Federal Democratic Republic of Nepal. The president is the nominal head of the executive, the first citizen of the country, and the supreme commander of the Nepalese Armed Forces. Ram Chandra Paudel is the third and current president since 13 March 2023.

The president is indirectly elected by an electoral college comprising the Federal Parliament of Nepal and the provincial assemblies of each of Nepal's seven provinces, who themselves are all directly elected.

The office was created in May 2008 after the country was declared a republic.

== Origin ==
Under the interim constitution adopted in January 2007, all powers of governance were removed from the king of Nepal, and the Nepalese Constituent Assembly elected in the 2008 Constituent Assembly election was to decide in its first meeting whether to continue the monarchy or to declare a republic. During the suspension of the monarchy, Girija Prasad Koirala, then prime minister of Nepal, acted as the head of state. On 28 May 2008, the Assembly voted to abolish the monarchy. Ram Baran Yadav was elected by a historic vote in the Constituent Assembly, and was sworn in as the nation's first president, ending a 247-year-old monarchy.

== Selection process ==
=== Eligibility ===
Part 6, Article 64 of the Constitution of Nepal 2015 says that a person shall be eligible to be president by meeting the following qualifications:

1. Must:
  - Be eligible to be a member of the Federal Parliament.
  - Have attained at least 45 years of age, and
  - Not be ineligible by any law.
2. Notwithstanding anything contained in clause (1), a person who has already been elected president for two terms, shall not be eligible to be a Presidential candidate for a Presidential election.

=== Election ===
The election process of the president of Nepal as per Part 6, Article 62 of the constitution is as follows:

1. An electoral college, consisting of voting members of the Federal Parliament and the members of the seven Provincial Assembly, shall elect the President. It shall be done as provided for in law with the difference of weightage in voting of the members of the Federal Parliament and the members of Provincial Assembly. The total population of the country is divided by the total of provincial assembly seats, rounded up, which give the "weight" of the provincial members votes. This weight is then multiplied by 1.64 and rounded up, giving the weight of the federal parliamentary members. In 2018 and 2023, the 550 members of the provincial assemblies thus had a weighted voice of 48 each, and the 275 members of the lower house and 59 members of the upper house a weighted vote of 79 each.
2. Notwithstanding anything contained in clause (1), it shall not be deemed to prevent the formation of an electoral college for the use of the election of the President simply because of the reason that an election of Provincial Assembly has not been held in any province.
3. The person who receives majority votes of the total number of existing members of the Electoral College as provided for in clause (1), shall be elected as president.
4. If any candidate fails to receive majority votes according to clause (3), there shall be a second round of voting between the two candidates who receive the highest votes, and a person getting more than fifty percent of the votes of the total number of existing members of the Electoral College shall be elected as president.
5. If none of the two candidates obtain more than fifty percent of the votes in the voting held under clause (4), then a third round will be conducted. Any person getting the majority of valid votes cast in this re-voting shall be elected as president.
6. If a person who is elected to the position of the President already holds a political position through election, nomination, or appointment, the position held by such a person shall automatically become vacant.
7. The election of the President and other related arrangements shall be as provided for by law.

Part 6, Article 70 states that the election of president and vice president should be conducted in a manner so as to represent different gender and/or communities. This allows for representation of female and minority communities at the nation's two highest offices.

== Incumbency ==
=== Terms of Office ===
The presidential term is five years. A president cannot be elected more than twice in succession. However, a president whose term has expired can remain in office on an interim basis until their successor is elected and sworn in.

=== Removal ===
The circumstances under which the president ceases to hold office as per Part 6, Article 64 of the constitution is as follows:

1. If a written resignation is tendered to the vice-president.
2. If an impeachment motion against the president is passed pursuant to Article 101.
3. If the term of office expires.
4. If he/she dies.

=== Travel ===
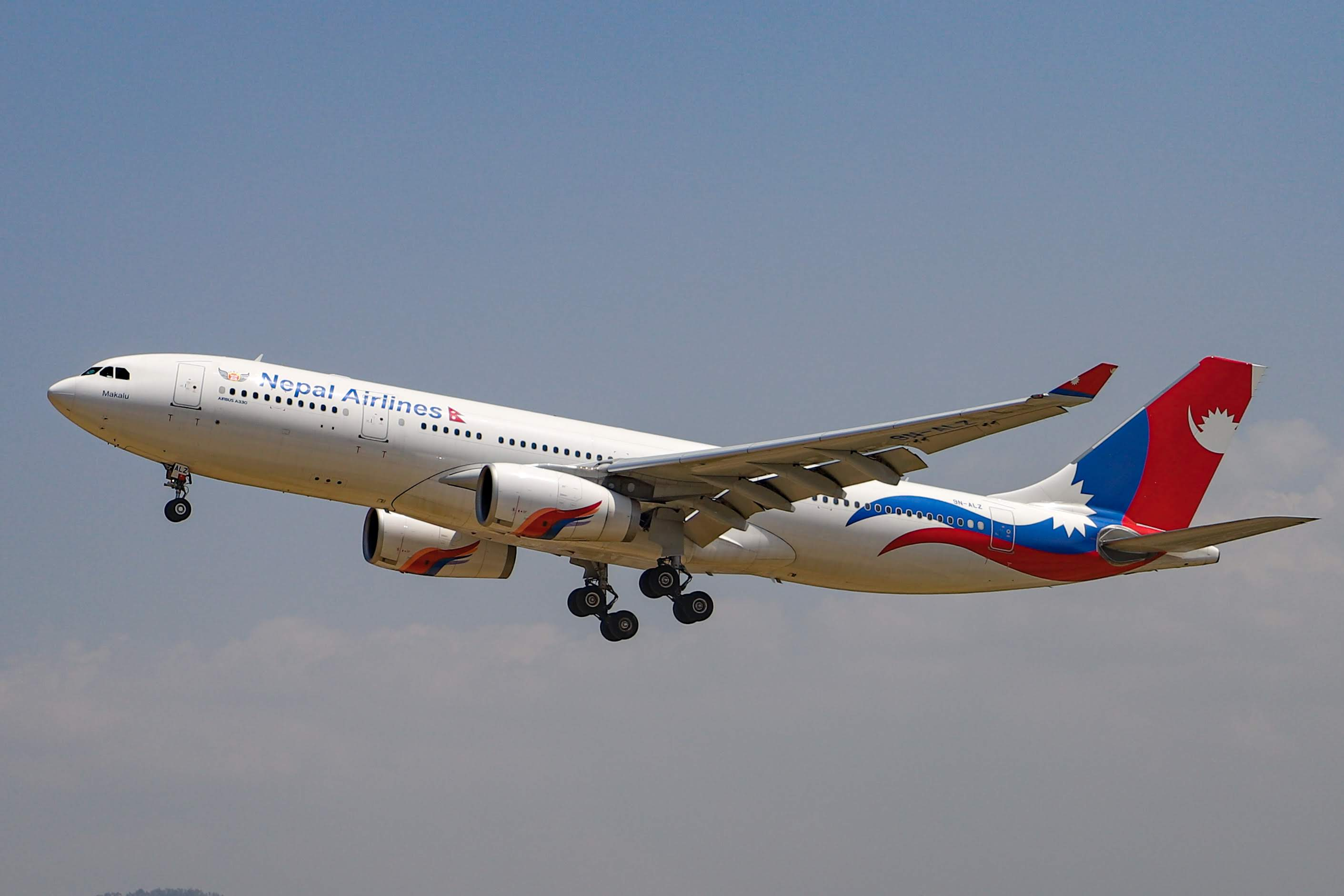
The president uses Nepal Airlines' A330-200 for international travel

The president uses the state carrier, Nepal Airlines' Airbus A330-200 for international travel, whereas a Nepal Army's VIP AgustaWestland AW139 helicopter for travel within the country.

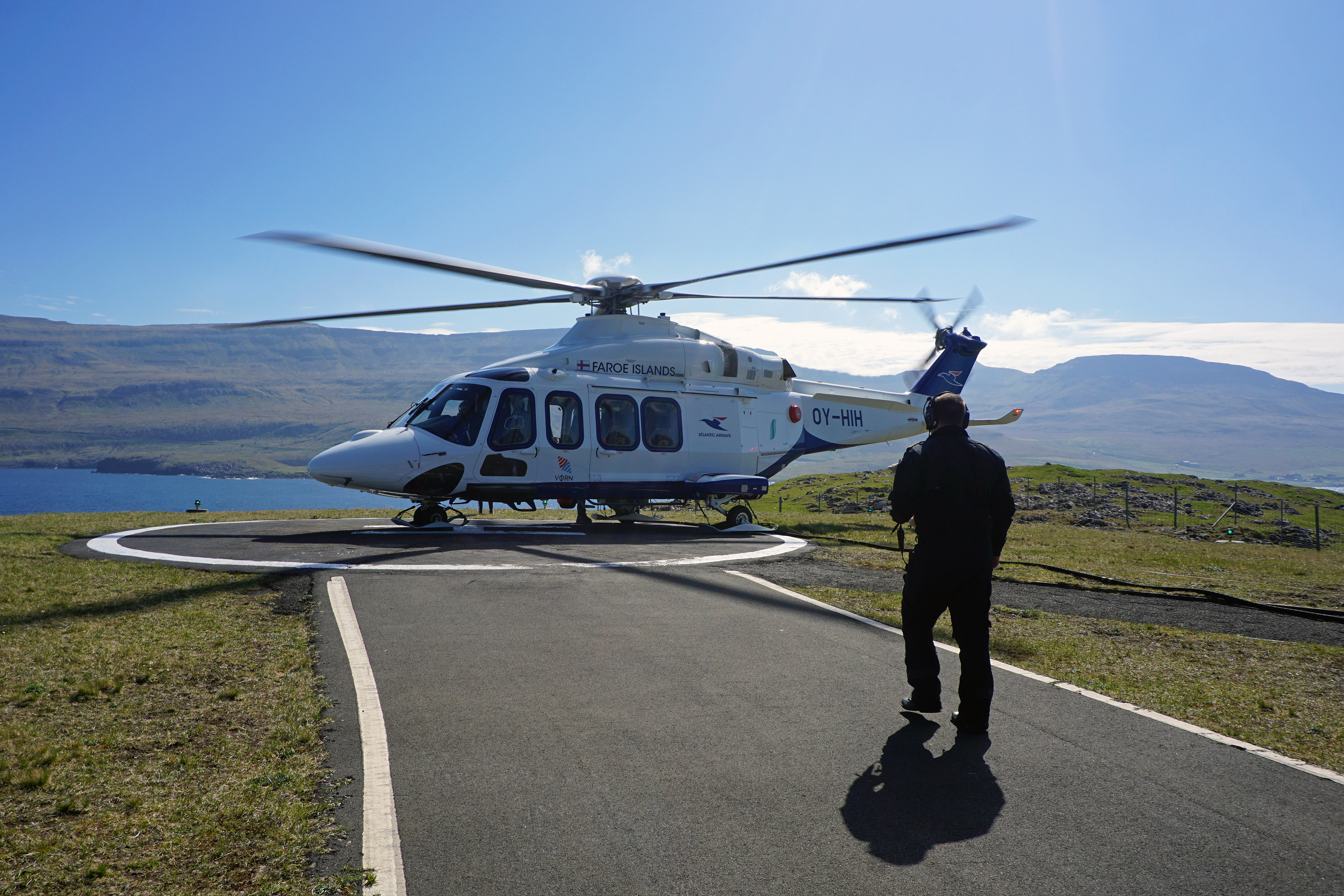
A similar type model of the helicopter used by the president.

== Powers and duties ==
The president's powers are almost entirely ceremonial. In some parliamentary republics, the president is vested with executive powers on paper, but is bound by convention to act on the advice of the prime minister and the government. In Nepal, however, the president is not even the nominal chief executive, as Section 75 of the Constitution explicitly vests executive power in the Council of Ministers Part 6, Article 61, Section 4 of the constitution states that the president is the guardian of the constitution; and compliance and protection of the constitution shall be the main duties of the president. The basic functions, duties and powers of the president are outlined by Part 6, Article 66 of the constitution:

1. President shall exercise his/her rights and duties as provided for by this constitution and Federal laws.
2. While exercising rights under clause (1), the President shall perform all the works with the consent and recommendation of the Council of Ministers, except in case where the works have to be performed expressly under the recommendation of some agency or official. Such consent and recommendation shall be made to the President through the Prime Minister.
3. The decision or order made in the name of the President as provided for by clause (2) and the certification of credentials in that regard, shall be done as specified by Federal law.

== Republic ==
The following is a list of the heads of state of Nepal, from the unification of the country and the establishment of the Kingdom of Nepal in 1768 to the present day.

The King of Nepal was the country's head of state from the unification and the establishment of the kingdom in 1768 to 2008. Since 2008, the head of state has been the president of Nepal after the abolition of monarchy and the establishment of a republic.

=== Transitional period (State of Nepal, 2007–2008) ===
Under the interim constitution adopted in January 2007, all powers of governance were removed from the king, and the Constituent Assembly elected in 2008 was to decide in its first meeting whether to continue the monarchy or to declare a republic. During the suspension of the monarchy, Girija Prasad Koirala, then Prime Minister of Nepal, acted as the Head of State. On 28 May 2008, the Assembly voted to abolish the monarchy. Ram Baran Yadav was elected by the Constituent Assembly, and was sworn in as the nation's first president on 23 July 2008.

== See also ==
- Vice President of Nepal
- King of Nepal, heads of state of the former Kingdom of Nepal
- List of heads of state of Nepal, for a comprehensive list of Nepalese heads of state since 1768
- List of prime ministers of Nepal
