= Order of precedence in Nepal =

Relative preeminence of officials for ceremonial purposes

The Order of precedence of Nepal is the protocol list (hierarchy) in which the functionaries and officials are listed according to their rank and office in the Government of Nepal. As the country embraces federalism, the government finalized a new order of precedence in April 2019. The earlier order of precedence was revised by adjusting some key positions, mainly with the provincial administrations in place. The President is at the top of protocol, followed by the Vice President and then the Prime Minister.

== Order of Precedence (since 2019) ==
Source: Nepal Gazette (published 29 April 2019)
| Order | Position |
|---|---|
| 1 | President (Ram Chandra Poudel) |
| 2 | Vice President (Ram Sahaya Yadav) |
| 3 | Prime Minister (Balendra Shah) |
| 4 | Chief Justice (Manoj Kumar Sharma) |
| 5 | Speaker of the House of Representatives (Dol Prasad Aryal); Chairperson of the National Assembly (Narayan Prasad Dahal) |
| 6 | Former Head of States (Dr. Ram Baran Yadav and Bidya Devi Bhandari); Deputy Prime Minister (vacant); Former Vice President (Parmanand Jha and Nanda Kishor Pun); Former Prime Minister (Lokendra Bahadur Chand, Sher Bahadur Deuba, Pushpa Kamal Dahal, Madhav Kumar Nepal, Baburam Bhattarai, Jhalanath Khanal, KP Sharma Oli and Sushila Karki); Former Chairman of Council of Ministers (Khil Raj Regmi); Former Chief Justices ( Min Bahadur Rayamajhi, Anup Raj Sharma, Ram Prasad Shrestha, Khil Raj Regmi, Damodar Prasad Sharma, Ram Kumar Shah, Kalyan Shrestha, Sushila Karki, Gopal Prasad Parajuli, Om Prakash Mishra, Cholendra Shumser JBR, Hari Krishna Karki, Bishwambhar Prasad Shrestha, and Prakash Man Singh Raut) |
| 7 | Governors of provinces (within their respective provinces) (Governor of Provinces of Nepal) |
| 8 | Cabinet ministers of the Government of Nepal; Chief ministers of provinces; Governors of provinces (when outside their respective provinces); Leader of the Opposition in the House of Representatives; Recipients of the Nepal Ratna (Nepal Ratna Man Padavi); Former Chairpersons of the Constituent Assembly; Deputy Speaker of the House of Representatives; Deputy Chairperson of the National Assembly (Lila Kumari Bhandari); Deputy Leader of the House in the House of Representatives; Former Speakers of the Legislature Parliament; Former Speaker of the House of Representatives; Former Chairpersons of the National Assembly; Former Deputy Prime Ministers |
| 9 | Ministers of State in the Government of Nepal; Chief Government Whip in the House of Representatives; Chief Opposition Whip in the House of Representatives; Chairpersons of various committees in the House of Representatives; Chairpersons of various committees in the National Assembly; Vice–chair of the National Planning Commission; Justices of the Supreme Court; Chief of Constitutional bodies; Members of the Judicial Council; Attorney General -Khamma Bahadur Khati; Leader of the House in the National Assembly; Chief Government Whip in the National Assembly; Leader of the Opposition in the National Assembly; Chief Opposition Whip in the National Assembly; Speakers of Provincial Assemblies |
| 10 | Assistant Ministers in the Government of Nepal; Members of the House of Representatives; Members of the National Assembly; Former cabinet ministers; Chief Judges of the High Courts; Cabinet ministers of provincial governments; Deputy Speakers of Provincial Assemblies; State ministers of provincial governments; Chairpersons of various committees in the provincial assemblies; Mayor of Kathmandu Metropolitan City; Former members of the Constituent Assembly; Former Members of Parliament; Chief Secretary of the Government of Nepal; Chief of Army Staff (Ashok Raj Sigdel) |
| 11 | Assistant ministers of provincial governments; Whips in Provincial Assemblies; Members of Provincial Assemblies; Mayors of metropolitan cities (except Kathmandu); Chairpersons of District Coordination Committees |
| 12 | Members and Commissioners of constitutional bodies; Members of the National Planning Commission; General Secretary of the Federal Parliament; Chief Registrar of the Supreme Court; Governor of Nepal Rastra Bank; Chancellor of Nepal Academy; Vice–chancellors of national universities |
| 13 | Secretaries of the Government of Nepal and Gazetted Special Class Officers; Recipients of national orders; Ambassador of Nepal to foreign countries; Foreign Ambassadors to Nepal; Secretary–General of the South Asian Association for Regional Cooperation; Lieutenant Generals of the Nepal Army; Inspector–General of the Nepal Police; Inspector–General of the Armed Police Force; Chief of the National Investigation Department; Vice–chancellor of Nepal Academy; Professors of national universities; Mayors of sub–metropolitan cities; Deputy Mayor of Kathmandu (Sunita Dangol); Mayors of municipalities |
| 14 | Judges of High Courts; Chief Attorneys; United Nations Resident Coordinator in Nepal |
| 15 | Chairpersons of provincial Public Service Commissions; Major Generals of the Nepal Army; Additional Inspectors General of the Nepal Police; Additional Inspectors General of the Armed Police Force; Additional Chiefs of the National Investigation Department; Members of provincial Public Service Commissions |
| 16 | Deputy Mayors of metropolitan cities (except Kathmandu); Vice Chairpersons of District Coordination Committees; Chairpersons of rural municipalities; Deputy Mayors of sub–metropolitan cities; Deputy Mayors of municipalities; Joint–Secretaries of the Government of Nepal and Gazetted First Class Officers; Chief Judge of District Courts; Chief District Officer (Gazetted First Class); Associate Professors of national universities |
| 17 | Brigadier Generals of the Nepal Army; Deputy Inspectors General of the Nepal Police; Deputy Inspectors General of the Armed Police Force; Directors of the National Investigation Department; Foreign Consuls General to Nepal; Colonels of the Nepal Army; Senior Superintendents of the Nepal Police; Senior Superintendents of the Armed Police Force; Joint–Directors of the National Investigation Department; Gazetted First Class Officers appointed by provincial governments and local administration; Chief District Officer (Gazetted Second Class); Heads and Executives of Public Offices; Vice–chairpersons of rural municipalities |
| 18 | Under Secretaries of the Government of Nepal and Gazetted Second Class Officers; Lieutenant Colonels of the Nepal Army; Superintendents of the Nepal Police; Superintendents of the Armed Police Force; Deputy Directors of the National Investigation Department |
| 19 | Majors of the Nepal Army; Deputy Superintendents of the Nepal Police; Deputy Superintendents of the Armed Police Force; Chief Investigative Officers of the National Investigation Department; Gazetted Second Class Officers appointed by provincial governments and local administration |
| 20 | Captains of the Nepal Army; Section Officers of the Government of Nepal and Gazetted Third Class Officers; Assistant Professors of national universities |
| 21 | Lieutenants of the Nepal Army; Inspectors of the Nepal Police; Inspectors of the Armed Police Force; Investigative Officers of the National Investigation Department |
| 22 | Gazetted Third Class Officers appointed by provincial governments and local administration; Second Lieutenants of the Nepal Army |

== Former orders of precedence ==
=== Order of Precedence (1990–2007) ===
From the start of the parliamentary monarchy system in 1990 until the abolition of the monarchy in 2007, a different Order of precedence was in force in Nepal, one which gave more precedence to royal family members and career bureaucrats and Army officers over that of Members of Parliament.

| Order | Position |
|---|---|
| 1 | The King and Queen consort |
| 2 | The Queen Mother (surviving wife of the former King); The Crown Prince and Crown Princess |
| 3 | Siblings of the King and next-in-line to Crown Prince |
| 4 | Children of the King; Children of the Crown Prince |
| 5 | Children of the siblings of the King |
| 6 | Parents and siblings of the Queen consort; Parents and siblings of the Crown Princess |
| 7 | Parents and siblings of the spouses of the siblings of the King; Parents and siblings of the Queen Mother |
| 8 | Spouses of the children of the King |
| 9 | Spouses of the children of the Crown Prince and the siblings of the King |
| 10 | Prime Minister; Deputy Prime Minister; Chief Justice |
| 11 | Speaker of the Parliament; Cabinet ministers of His Majesty's Government |
| 12 | Justices of the Supreme Court; Attorney General; Cabinet Secretary; Chief of Army Staff of the Royal Nepal Army; Chief Secretary of His Majesty's Government; Deputy Speaker of the Parliament |
| 13 | Deputy and Assistant ministers of His Majesty's Government; Chief Judges of Regional Appellate Courts; Governor of Nepal Rastra Bank; Lieutenant Generals/General Commanding Officers of the Royal Nepal Army; Additional Cabinet Secretaries/Ministry Heads of Civil Service; Director General of the Royal Nepal Police; Director General of the Royal Nepal Armed Police Force |
| 14 | Members of Parliament; Judges of Regional Appellate Courts; Ambassadors of the Republic of India and People's Republic of China; Deputy Attorney General; Major Generals of the Royal Nepal Army; Additional/Principal Secretaries of Government departments/Chief Regional Officers; Additional Director-Generals of Royal Nepal Police and Armed Police |
| 15 | Other Foreign Ambassadors to Nepal; Secretary General of the South Asian Association for Regional Cooperation; Nepalese Ambassadors to foreign countries; Registrar of the Supreme Court |
| 16 | Joint Secretaries of Civil Service/Chief Zonal Officers; Brigadier Generals of the Royal Nepal Army; Inspectors General/Zonal Police Officers of the Royal Nepal Police and Armed Police; Defence Attaché of Republic of India and People's Republic of China |
| 17 | Colonel of the Royal Nepal Army; Deputy Secretaries of Civil Service/Chief District Officers; Senior Superintendents of Police/Battalion Commanders/Chief District Police Officers of the Royal Nepal Police and Armed Police Force; Chairmen of municipalities and village councils |

=== Order of Precedence (2013–2018) ===
This order was endorsed by government in Feb 2013. The earlier order was made in 1990 following the restoration of democracy in which PM was in the 10th position after the members of the then royal family. But after the declaration of republic in 2008 there was absence of such state protocol for over four years.

| Order | Position |
|---|---|
| 1 | President |
| 2 | Vice President |
| 3 | Prime Minister |
| 4 | Chief Justice |
| 5 | Speaker |
| 6 | Former Presidents; Deputy Prime Ministers |
| 7 | Ministers of the Government of Nepal; Leader of the Opposition; Former Vice–Presidents; Former Prime Ministers; Former Chief Justices; Deputy Speaker |
| 8 | State Ministers of the Government of Nepal; Chairpersons of parliamentary committees |
| 9 | Vice–chair of the National Planning Commission; Chancellors of Academies |
| 10 | Justices of the Supreme Court; Members of the Judicial Council |
| 11 | Assistant Ministers of the Government of Nepal |
| 12 | Members of Parliament |
| 13 | Chief Commissioner, Commission for the Investigation of Abuse of Authority; Auditor General, Office of the Auditor General; Chairman, Public Service Commission; Chief Commissioner, Election Commission; Chairman, National Human Rights Commission; Attorney General, Office of the Attorney General; Chief Secretary; Chief of Army Staff; General Secretary of Parliament Secretariat |
| 14 | Chief Justices of Appellate Courts; Members of the National Planning Commission; Members of constitutional bodies; Governor of Nepal Rastra Bank; Vice–Chancellors of Universities |
| 15 | Government Secretaries; Special Class Officers; Foreign Ambassadors to Nepal; Secretary General of SAARC; Nepalese Ambassadors to foreign countries; Register of the Supreme Court; Deputy Attorney General; Judges of the Appellate Courts |
| 16 | Lieutenant Generals of Nepal Army; Chief of Nepal Police; Chief of Armed Police Force; Chief of Department of National Intelligence; UN Resident Coordinator in Nepal |
| 17 | Major Generals of Nepal Army; Additional Inspectors General of Nepal Police; Additional Inspectors General of Armed Police Force; Deputy Chief Investigation Officers of Department of National Intelligence |
| 18 | Presidents of District Development Committees; Mayors of metropolitan cities |
| 19 | Joint Secretaries; First-class gazetted officials; Director Generals; District Court Judges; Mayors of sub–metropolitan cities; Mayors of municipalities; Vice–chairpersons of District Development Committees; Deputy Mayors of municipalities |
| 20 | Foreign Consuls General to Nepal; Chiefs of Public Services Utilities |
| 21 | Brigadier Generals of Nepal Army; Deputy Inspectors General of Nepal Police; Deputy Inspectors General of Armed Police Force; Deputy Inspectors General of Intelligence Department |
| 22 | Colonels of Nepal Army; Senior Superintendents of Nepal Police; Senior Superintendents of Armed Police Force; Senior Superintendents of Intelligence Department |
| 23 | Under Secretaries; Directors of Various Government Entities; Second-class Gazetted Officials |
| 24 | Lieutenant Colonels of Nepal Army; Superintendents of Nepal Police; Superintendents of Armed Police Force; Superintendents of Intelligence Department |
| 25 | Majors of Nepal Army; Deputy Superintendents of Nepal Police; Deputy Superintendents of Armed Police Force; Chairpersons of Village Development Committees |
| 26 | Captains of Nepal Army; Section Officers; Vice–chairpersons of Village Development Committees |
| 27 | Lieutenants of Nepal Army; Inspectors of Nepal Police; Inspectors of Armed Police Force; Inspectors of Intelligence Department |
| 28 | Second Lieutenant of Nepal Army |

== See also ==
- List of heads of state by diplomatic precedence
