= Nepal Law Campus =

Law college in Kathmandu, Nepal

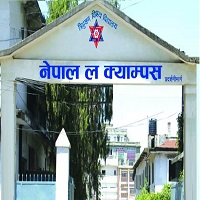
- Former names: Nepal Law College
- Established: 1954
- Founders: Ram Raj Pant
- Affiliations: Faculty of Law, Tribhuvan University
- Location: Exhibition Road, Kathmandu, Nepal
- Website: nlc.tu.edu.np

Nepal Law Campus (Nepali: नेपाल ल क्याम्पस), originally called Nepal Law College, is the oldest college under the Faculty of Law of Tribhuvan University - the oldest and largest university of Nepal. Nepal Law Campus was established in 1954 by three professors of Tri-Chandra College under the leadership of Prof. Ram Raj Pant, who also served as its founding Principal. Two others instrumental in the establishment were Prof. Ratna Bahadur Bista and Prof. Ashutosh Ganguli. Initially, the College operated under the affiliation of Patna University of India. Before shifting to its present location at Exhibition Road in Kathmandu, the College operated as evening school at Durbar High School in Rani Pokhari, Kathmandu.

The College initially taught law courses based on Patna University syllabus. In its early days, the students were trained primarily on Indian and Common law. After the establishment of the Tribhuvan University, Nepal Law College took the lead from early on to set up legal educational framework in Nepal and worked with Patna University to introduce courses on the National Code of 1910 B.S. for its law degree.

When Tribhuvan University was established in Nepal, the Institute of Law was founded within the University. Later the Institute of Law was converted into the Faculty of Law. Nepal Law Campus presently is a constituent college under the Faculty of Law, Tribhuvan University.

Nepal Law Campus offers three year Bachelor of Laws (LL.B.), a five-year Bachelor of Arts Bachelor of Laws (BA LL.B.) and two-year and three-year Master of Laws (LL.M.) programs. The programs are taught by accomplished professors, readers and lecturers with varied background from government, judiciary and private legal practice. The Campus produces thousands of law graduates who are engaged in various governmental, non-governmental organizations and judicial systems inside the country and abroad. Its graduates have held highest positions in legal and administrative sectors like the Attorney General of Nepal, Chief Justice of Nepal, Justices of Supreme Court, judges and judicial officers in Nepal as well as advocates and academics in various universities in Nepal and around the world. All the present Supreme Court Justices, including the Chief Justice, Law Minister, Attorney General, Law Secretaries, and Foreign Secretary, got their law degrees from Nepal Law Campus.

Nepal Law Campus is located at the heart of Kathmandu on Exhibition Road .

== Notable alumni ==
- Bishwonath Upadhyaya, Chief Justice of the Supreme Court of Nepal, 8 December 1991 – 22 September 1995
- Khil Raj Regmi, Chief Justice of the Supreme Court of Nepal, 6 May 2011 – 11 April 2014
- Sushila Karki, Chief Justice of the Supreme Court of Nepal, 11 July 2016 – 6 June 2017
- Yagyamani Neupane, Member of Parliament (2026–present), Rastriya Swatantra Party
- Madhu Kumar Chaulagain, Member of Parliament (2026–present), Rastriya Swatantra Party
- Govinda Panthi, Member of Parliament (2026–present), Rastriya Swatantra Party
- Manish Khanal, Member of Parliament (2026–present), Rastriya Swatantra Party
- Gopal Prasad Parajuli, Chief Justice of the Supreme Court of Nepal, 17 July 2017 – 14 March 2018
- Om Prakash Mishra, Chief Justice of the Supreme Court of Nepal, 10 September 2018 – 1 January 2019
- Cholendra Shumsher JB Rana, Chief Justice of the Supreme Court of Nepal, 2 January 2019 – 13 December 2022
- Hari Krishna Karki, Chief Justice of the Supreme Court of Nepal, 16 June 2023 – 4 August 2023
- Subash Chandra Nemwang, chairman of the 1st Nepalese Constituent Assembly 2008
- Surya Subedi, Professor of International Law at the University of Leeds, England
- Manoj Kumar Sharma, Chief Justice of the Supreme Court of Nepal since 19 May 2026
