= 2005 in Nepal =

- Decades: 1980s; 1990s; 2000s; 2010s; 2020s
- See also: Other events of 2005; Timeline of Nepalese history

Events from the year 2005 in Nepal.

== Incumbents ==
- Monarch: Gyanendra
- Prime Minister: Sher Bahadur Deuba (until 1 February)
- Chief Justice:
  - Until 13 January: Govinda Bahadur Shrestha
  - 14 January - 29 July: Hari Prasad Sharma
  - Starting 31 July: Dilip Kumar Poudel

== Events ==
- February 1 - King Gyanendra dismisses the government of Sher Bahadur Deuba and assumes direct authority.
- April 7 - Maoists attack on a Royal Nepal Army base in Khara, Rukum fails, leading to death of at least 166 insurgents.
- July 6 - Maoists bomb a civilian bus in Bandarmude, Chitwan killing 38 and injuring around 75.
- August 30 - September 2 - 11th General Convention of Nepali Congress.
