= 2004 in Nepal =

- Decades: 1980s; 1990s; 2000s; 2010s; 2020s
- See also: Other events of 2004; Timeline of Nepalese history

Events from the year 2004 in Nepal.

== Incumbents ==
- Monarch: Gyanendra
- Prime Minister: Surya Bahadur Thapa (until 3 June), Sher Bahadur Deuba (starting 3 June)
- Chief Justice: Kedar Nath Upadhyaya (until 21 January), Govinda Bahadur Shrestha (starting 22 January)

== Events ==
- March 3 - Maoists attack a telecommunications tower guarded by security forces in Bhojpur District in eastern Nepal, killing 39 government troops while losing 10 of their cadres overnight in one of the fiercest gunbattles between the two sides.
- March 21 - At least 500 Maoist rebels, 11 soldiers and 7 policemen are killed and 200 injured in one of the bloodiest gunfights with security forces in Myagdi District in western Nepal, 450 km west of Kathmandu where the rebels attacked a district headquarters, freed some prisoners from a jail and looted a bank, according to the Nepalese army. However, Nepal's Maoist rebels denied these claims.
- March 29 - Maoist leader Mohan Baidya is arrested in Siliguri, India.
- April 1 - In the largest such incident in the country, armed Maoists abduct approximately 1,000 villagers from seven villages in a single district of Western Nepal
- April 3 - Maoists explode a powerful bomb at the house of the home minister of Nepal damaging the house and injuring security guards.
- April 4 - Maoists reportedly set ablaze nine Indian vehicles and opened fire on three Indians a few hours after the rebels bombed the house of home minister of Nepal, Mr. Kamal Thapa.
- August 31-September 6 - Riots ensue over the Nepal hostage crisis, when 12 Nepalis were taken as hostages in Iraq.
- September 8 - Qatar Airways resumes flights to Kathmandu after shutting down operations after an attack on its office in the capital the previous week.
- September 8 - Spice Cell Nepal granted license to operate the first private sector mobile phone service in Nepal.
