= 2003 in Nepal =

- Decades: 1980s; 1990s; 2000s; 2010s; 2020s
- See also: Other events of 2003; Timeline of Nepalese history

Events from the year 2003 in Nepal.

== Incumbents ==
- Monarch: Gyanendra
- Prime Minister: Lokendra Bahadur Chand (until 3 June), Surya Bahadur Thapa (starting 3 June)
- Chief Justice: Kedar Nath Upadhyaya

== Events ==
=== January ===
- January 10 - Maoists send a letter threatening journalist Rabin Prasad Thapalia with death for an article deemed sympathetic to government forces.
- January 26 - Armed Police Force Inspector General of Police Krishna Mohan Shrestha is killed along with his wife and bodyguard by Maoists.
- January 29 - The Maoists and the government announce a cease fire.

=== February ===
- February 15 - Journalist Deepak Thapa is reportedly confined to his village by local Maoist leaders in Accham district due to his reporting.

=== April ===
- The first round of peace talks are held between the Nepali government and the Maoists.

=== May ===
- The second round of peace talks are held between the Nepali government and the Maoists.
- May 30 - Prime Minister Lokendra Bahadur Chand resigns following political pressure, and Surya Bahadur Thapa is appointed Prime Minister.
- May 31 - 18 Tibetan asylum-seekers are forcibly returned to China despite international appeals.

=== August ===
- The third round of peace talks are held between the Nepali government and the Maoists.
- August 17 - Royal Nepal Army executes 19 Maoists in Doramba, Ramechhap district.
- August 27 - Maoists unilaterally withdraw from the cease fire.
- August 28 - Journalist Ramahari Chaulugain is kidnapped near his office in Kathmandu by unidentified assailants.

=== September ===
- September 1 - Reli Maya Muktan is reportedly killed by Maoists in Doramba.
- September 7 - Nepalese Civil War: Journalist Gyanendra Khadka is killed by Maoist insurgents.
- September 9 - Editor Subhashankar Kandel is abducted from his home in Kathmandu by security forces, held in custody, and allegedly beaten.
- September 11 - Om Bahadur Thapa is arrested and allegedly tortured in the Singha Durbar army barracks.
- September 13 -
  - Miss Nepal beauty contest is held. The winner is Priti Sitoula of Kathmandu.
  - Sitaram Baral is abducted in Kathmandu by security forces, tortured, and hospitalized after release five days later. Premnath Joshi is also arrested at night from his home, with no charges filed.
- September 20 - Deepak Thapa is arrested and tortured in Hanuman Dhoka police custody.
- September 21 - Journalist Nawaraj Pahadi is arrested in Lamjung for reporting on corruption at a hydro power plant, and detained without charge.
- September 27 - Two girls, 14 and 16 years old, are raped by police officers in Banke district.

=== October ===
- October 13 - Royal Nepal Army fire indiscriminately at a Maoist-organized cultural program at Sharada Higher Secondary School in Doti, killing 4 students.

=== November ===
- November 18 - FNJ official Dhana Bahadur Magar is detained by security forces.

== Births ==
- October 16 – Princess Kritika of Nepal

== Deaths ==
- January 25 – Krishna Mohan Shrestha
