= Kedar Prasad Chalise =

Nepalese judge

Hon'ble Kedar Prasad Chalise केदार प्रसाद चालिसे

Justice of Supreme Court of Nepal
- Incumbent
- Assumed office 1 August 2016

Personal details
- Born: November 19, 1954 (age 70); Rautahat, Nepal
- Occupation: Justice

Kedar Prasad Chalise (Nepali: केदार प्रसाद चालिसे) is a Nepalese judge. He is currently a justice of the Supreme Court of Nepal.

== See also ==
- Deepak Raj Joshee
- Gopal Prasad Parajuli
