= Regmi interim cabinet =

Government of Nepal from 2013 to 2014

2013 Regmi interim cabinet
- Cabinet of Nepal

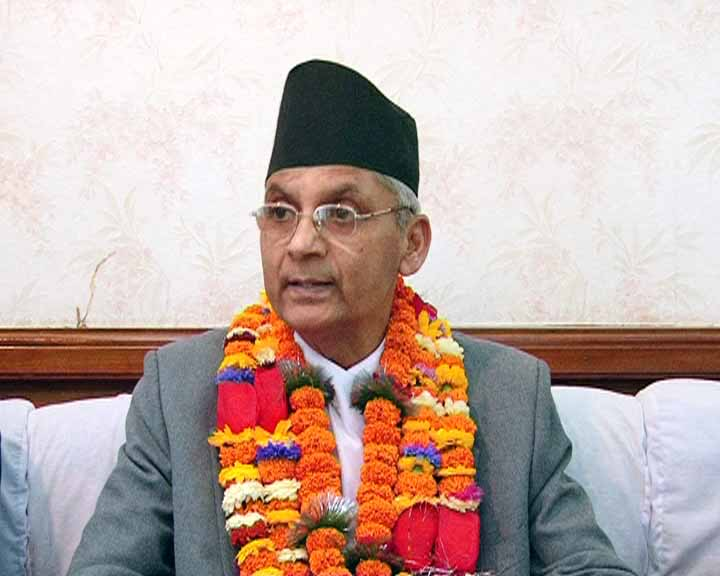
- Date formed: 14 March 2013
- Date dissolved: 11 February 2014

People and organisations
- Head of state: Ram Baran Yadav
- Head of government: Khil Raj Regmi
- Member party: Independent

History
- Predecessor: Bhattarai Cabinet
- Successor: Koirala Cabinet

On 14 March 2013, former Chief Justice of Nepal Khil Raj Regmi was sworn in as the interim Prime Minister of Nepal after the major parties of Nepal agreed to let an Independent politician lead the government and prepare the 2013 Nepalese Constituent Assembly election. It was agreed that Regmi had to hand over the power to the new Government of Nepal which would emerge from the elections slated for 21 June 2013 with the amendment that Regmi would keep heading the government until the actual government would be sworn in. Regmi appointed a technocratic Council of Ministers consisting of retired civil servants.

== Ministers ==
Minister	Portfolio	Background	Assumed office	Left office
Khil Raj Regmi	Interim Prime Minister; Minister for Defense; Minister for Cooperatives and Poverty Alleviation	Chief Justice of Nepal	14 March 2013	11 February 2014
Madhav Ghimire	Home Affairs; Minister for Foreign Affairs	Chief Secretary	14 March 2013	11 February 2014
Hari Prasad Neupane	Minister for Law, Justice, Constituent Assembly & Parliamentary Affairs; Minister for Labour and Employment	Secretary of Law	14 March 2013	11 February 2014
Bidyadhar Mallik	Minister for Federal Affairs and Local Development; Minister for Health and Population	Finance Secretary and Financial Advisor to President Ram Baran Yadav	18 March 2013	11 February 2014
Riddhibaba Pradhan	Minister for Women, Children, Social Welfare; Minister for Land Reform and Management	Secretary of Tourism	18 March 2013	11 February 2014
Madhav Paudel	Minister for General Administration; Minister for Information and Communications; Minister for Education	Secretary of Law	18 March 2013	11 February 2014
Shankar Prasad Koirala	Minister for Finance; Minister for Industry; Minister for Commerce and Supply	Secretary of Energy	18 March 2013	11 February 2014
Chhaviraj Panta	Minister for Physical Infrastructure and Transportation; Minister for Urban Development	Secretary of Forests	18 March 2013	11 February 2014
Tek Bahadur Thapa Gharti	Minister for Agricultural Development; Minister for Forest and Soil Conservation	Secretary of Agriculture	18 March 2013	11 February 2014
Ram Kumar Shrestha	Minister for Youth and Sports; Minister for Peace and Reconstruction; Minister for Culture, Tourism and Civil Aviation	Secretary of Local Development	18 March 2013	11 February 2014
Umakant Jha	Minister for Energy; Minister for Science, Technology and Environment; Minister for Irrigation	Secretary of Irrigation	18 March 2013	11 February 2014
