= Sharada Prasad Ghimire =

Nepalese judge

Hon'ble Sharada Prasad Ghimire शारदा प्रसाद घिमिरे

Justice of Supreme Court of Nepal
- Incumbent
- Assumed office 1 August 2016

Personal details
- Born: 5 January 1954 (age 72) Kathmandu, Nepal
- Occupation: Justice

Sharada Prasad Ghimire (Nepali: शारदा प्रसाद घिमिरे) is a Nepalese Judge. He is currently a justice of the Supreme Court of Nepal.

== See also ==
- Deepak Raj Joshee
- Gopal Prasad Parajuli
