= Deepak Kumar Karki =

Chief justice of Nepal

Hon'ble Deepak Kumar Karki दीपक कुमार कार्की Chief justice of Nepal

Chief Justice of Supreme Court of Nepal
- Incumbent
- Assumed office 1 August 2016

Personal details
- Born: 2 October 1957 (age 68) Kathmandu, Nepal
- Occupation: Present Chief Justice of Nepal 2079

Deepak Kumar Karki (Nepali: दीपक कुमार कार्की) is a Nepalese Judge. He is currently a chief justice of the Supreme Court of Nepal.

== See also ==
- Deepak Raj Joshee
- Gopal Prasad Parajuli
