= Chief Secretary of Nepal =

Government Officer of Nepal

- मुख्य सचिव

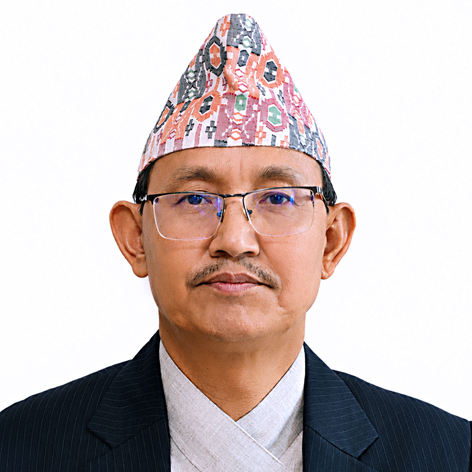
- Incumbent; Govinda Bahadur Karki since 10 July 2026
- Status: Chief Administrative Officer and senior–most civil servant of the Government of Nepal
- Member of: Public Service Commission
- Reports to: President of Nepal; Prime Minister of Nepal
- Seat: Singha Durbar, Kathmandu
- Appointer: Council of Ministers of Nepal
- Term length: 3 years
- Inaugural holder: Chandra Bahadur Thapa
- Formation: 14 October 1955; 70 years ago
- Succession: 10th (on the Order of precedence in Nepal)
- Website: opmcm.gov.np/our-team-detail/20/

The Chief Secretary (Nepali: मुख्य सचिव) is the chief administrative officer and senior–most civil servant of the Government of Nepal. The chief secretary is the head of the Cabinet Secretariat and is the secretary of the cabinet and the constitutional council. The Cabinet Secretary enforces cabinet discipline and coordinates between ministries.

The current Chief Secretary of Nepal is Govinda Bahadur Karki.

== List of Chief Secretaries ==
List of Chief Secretaries
Name	From	To
Chandra Bahadur Thapa	14 October 1955	28 June 1959
Kul Shekhar Sharma	11 April 1966	7 January 1969
Krishna Bam Malla	8 January 1969	9 January 1972
Kshetra Bikram Rana	10 January 1972	10 August 1973
Pradyumna Lal Rajbhandari	11 August 1973	10 August 1977
Krishna Bahadur Manandhar	11 August 1977	10 August 1981
Bhogendra Nath Rimal	11 August 1981	10 August 1985
Karna Dhoj Adhikary	11 August 1985	10 August 1989
Lok Bahadur Shrestha	11 August 1989	1 February 1991
Damodar Prasad Gautam	3 February 1991	5 November 1992
Madhusudan Prasad Gorkhali	6 November 1992	9 November 1994
Dr. Ishwar Prasad Upadhyaya	13 November 1994	11 December 1996
Balram Singh Malla	12 December 1996	14 August 1999
Tirtha Man Shakya	15 August 1999	14 March 2002
Keshav Raj Rajbhandari	3 April 2002	19 September 2002
Bimal Koirala	21 September 2002	31 August 2005
Lokman Singh Karki	19 September 2005	11 May 2006
Mukunda Sharma Paudel	4 June 2006	3 August 2006
Dr. Bhoj Raj Ghimire	4 August 2006	5 August 2009
Madhav Prasad Ghimire	6 August 2009	5 August 2012
Leela Mani Paudyal	6 August 2012	6 August 2015
Dr. Som Lal Subedi	7 August 2015	12 July 2017
Rajendra Kishor Chhetri	13 July 2017	24 October 2017
Lok Darshan Regmi	25 October 2017	1 October 2020
Shanker Das Bairagi	1 October 2020	15 June, 2023
Dr. Baikuntha Aryal	15 June 2023	23 June 2024
Lila Devi Gadtaula	25 July 2024	30 August 2024
Eaknarayan Aryal	30 August 2024	25 November 2025
Suman Raj Aryal	27 November 2025	09 July 2026
Govinda Bahadur Karki	10 July 2026	Incumbent

== See also ==
- Government of Nepal
