= Meera Khadka =

Nepalese judge

Hon'ble Meera Khadka मीरा खड्का

Justice of Supreme Court of Nepal
- Incumbent
- Assumed office 1 August 2016

Personal details
- Born: 15 May 1957 (age 67); Nepal
- Occupation: Justice

Meera Khadka (Nepali: मीरा खड्का) is a Nepalese Judge. She is currently a justice of the Supreme Court of Nepal.

== Awards ==
- Aishwarya Bidhya Padak on 5 June 1979
- Suprabal Gorkha Dakshina Bahu Third on 29 December 1994
- Suprabal Jana Sewa Shree Third on 29 May 2014

== See also ==
- Deepak Raj Joshee
- Gopal Prasad Parajuli
