= Lok Pratap Bista =

Former Minister of Nepal

Lok Pratap Bista MBE
- श्री लोकप्रताप बिस्ट

Ministry of Forests and Environment (Nepal)
- In office 25 September 1968 – 31 January 1972
- Monarch: King Mahendra
- Prime Minister: Surya Bahadur Thapa

Most Excellent Order of the British Empire

Gorkha Dakshin Bahu

Personal details
- Born: September 21, 1930 Dadeldhura, Nepal
- Died: 21 August 2010 (aged 79) Kathmandu, Nepal
- Resting place: Kathmandu, Nepal
- Citizenship: British Raj
- Relations: Ratna Bahadur Bista Ranasur Bista
- Parent: Kalpana Bista
- Education: Balliol College, Oxford
- Committees: Vidhan Sabha

Zamindar Sir Lok Pratap Bista (Nepali: श्री लोक प्रताप बिस्ट ), was appointed by late King Mahendra of Nepal as the minister of Forest and Environment under the government led by Prime minister Surya Bahadur Thapa. The decree for forest conservation was released under his tenure that made logging illegal which was signed by King Mahendra of Nepal on October 5, 1970. He is responsible for setting up the Shuklaphanta National Park and Bardiya National Park as a Wildlife Reserve in 1969 under his tenure as Minister of Forests from 1968 to 1972. When the Democratic Government was dissolved by King Mahendra, he was nominated to the National Panchayat and made a Minister of Forests and Environment in 1968. He is the nephew of the late Chief Justice Ratna Bahadur Bista. During his tenure as the Minister of Forestry in FY 1970 the National GDP was estimated at $840 million in which Agriculture and forestry accounted for two- thirds of GDP. There was a 7.5% increase in GDP from FY 1969 since he took office.

He was also elected as a Member of Vidhan Sabha twice.

== Personal life ==
Lok Pratap Bista was born to Tej Bahadur Bista, descendant of Captain Nar Bahadur Bista on 21 September 1930 in Dadeldhura, Nepal. He was the heir of a landowning aristocracy that was in exile from Kathmandu for their involvement in the conspiracy to kill the then Prime Minister Ranodip Singh Kunwar and his brother Dhir Shumsher Rana in 1881 AD which is called "38 sal parwa". This resulted in the executions of Bista Family who were residing in Bahadur Bhawan palace. Among the executed were, Lieutenant Rankeshar Bisht who was killed in Bhadgaon, while Captain Nara Bahadur Bisht and Surya Pratap Bisht were killed in Sankhamul, Baneshwor. Major Sangram Singh Bisht was killed in Bhotekoshi and Captain Bhoj Bisht were killed in Teku Kalimati. The rest of the family was exiled to the far western reaches of Dadeldhura.

After the family established itself in the region it was facing heavy opposition from Bhimdatta Panta primarily due to the business interests of the family that were seen as an obstacle to progress for the average farmer. As the public was uprising under Bhimdatta Panta against the landowning families he was forced to legitimize the family name and follow in the footsteps of his uncle Ratna Bahadur Bista by assuming office under the King of Nepal. Many have associated his family with the assassination of the revolutionary political figure Bhimdatta Panta due to their rivalry which quelled unrest in the Mahakali, Darchula region. Bhimdatta Panta was killed in Jogbudha forest and his head was hung in the market of Dadeldhura as a warning to any insurgents. Bista spent his later years with his family in Pipaladi as a Zamindar until the maoist insurgency.
