= Sapana Pradhan Malla =

Justice in the Supreme Court of Nepal

- सपना प्रधान मल्ल
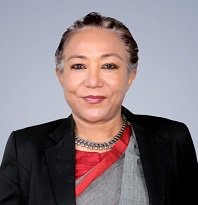
- Malla in 2016

Chief Justice of Nepal
- Acting
- In office 1 April 2026 – 19 May 2026
- President: Ram Chandra Paudel
- Preceded by: Prakash Man Singh Raut
- Succeeded by: Manoj Kumar Sharma

Justice of the Supreme Court of Nepal
- Incumbent
- Assumed office 1 August 2016

Personal details
- Born: 15 November 1963 (age 62) Nawalparasi District, Nepal
- Education: Nepal Law Campus (Tribhuvan University) (LLB) University of Delhi (MCL) Harvard Kennedy School (MPA)

Sapana Pradhan Malla (Nepali: सपना प्रधान मल्ल; born 15 November 1963) is a Nepali jurist, who is currently serving as a Justice of the Supreme Court of Nepal since 1 August 2016. She served as the acting Chief Justice from 1 April to 19 May 2026, following the retirement of Prakash Man Singh Raut.

Malla was a member of the 1st Nepalese Constituent Assembly. She has served as the former president of Judges Society, the professional organization of Nepalese judges.

Malla currently serves as the senior-most judge (puisne Judge) of the Supreme Court of Nepal.

== Early life and education ==
Malla was born on 15 November 1963, in Nawalparasi district in Nepal. She holds a Bachelor in Law from Tribhuwan University, Master in Comparative Law (MCL) from the Delhi University and Mid-Career Masters on Public Administration from Kennedy School of Government from Harvard University.

== Career ==
Malla has been practicing law since 1987 and became a Senior Advocate in 2013. A former member of the Nepalese Constituent Assembly from May 2008 to May 2012, she advocated for women's rights in all areas—from inclusion to reproductive rights to citizenship.

When asked about the challenges she faces as an advocate for women's rights, she told PassBlue: "When I started working on women’s rights, I decided to take up this work because it wasn’t just social, cultural bias against women that existed in the country, but even the law was problematic. But when you want to reform the law, you need to challenge everything: the state, the biases against women, culture, religion and a majority of patriarchal views."

In 2008, Malla and Yanar Mohammed were joint winners of the Gruber Prize for Women's Rights (given by the Peter and Patricia Gruber Foundation) for her work related to "public interest litigation in [Nepal], including equality in inheritance, legalization of abortion, criminalization of marital rape, equality in marriage and family law."

Malla was a member of the Committee Against Torture (CAT) during the 2014 to 2017 term. She is also the former president of the Forum for Women, Law & Development.
