= Prakash Man Singh Raut =

Nepalese judge

The Rt Hon. Prakash Man Singh Raut
- प्रकाशमान सिंह राउत

Chief Justice of Supreme Court of Nepal
- In office 6 October 2024 – 31 March 2026
- President: Ram Chandra Paudel
- Preceded by: Bishowambhar Prasad Shrestha
- Succeeded by: Sapana Pradhan Malla (acting)

Personal details
- Born: 31 March 1961 (age 65) Udayapur, Nepal
- Occupation: Justice

Prakash Man Singh Raut (Nepali: प्रकाशमान सिंह राउत) is the former chief justice of the Nepal. He served as the 32nd Chief Justice of Supreme Court of Nepal. He was appointed by the president on the recommendation of the Constitutional Council. He was administered the oath of the chief justice of the Supreme Court by Ram Chandra Paudel, President of Nepal on 6 October 2024.

== See also ==
- Deepak Raj Joshee
- Gopal Prasad Parajuli
