= Hari Prasad Sharma =

Former Chief Justice of Nepal

Former Hon'ble Hari Prasad Sharma

16th in Chief Justice of Nepal
- In office 14 January 2005 – 29 July 2005
- Appointed by: Gyanendra Bir Bikram Shah Dev
- Preceded by: Govinda Bahadur Shrestha
- Succeeded by: Dilip Kumar Poudel

Personal details
- Born: 29 July 1940 Rapti, Dang, Rajhena, Ward No 12, Tulsipur
- Spouse: Nima Kumari Gautam
- Children: 4

Hari Prasad Sharma (1940–Living) was a Nepalese judge who served as 16th Chief Justice of Nepal, in office from 14 January 2005 to 29 July 2005. He was appointed by the then-king of Nepal, Gyanendra.

Sharma was preceded by Govinda Bahadur Shrestha and succeeded by Dilip Kumar Poudel.
