= Hari Prasad Pradhan =

Former Chief Justice of Nepal

Former Hon'ble Hari Prasad Pradhan

1st in Chief Justice of Nepal
- In office 10 August 1951 – 20 May 1956
- Appointed by: Tribhuvan Bir Bikram Shah Dev
- Preceded by: Hari Prasad Pradhan
- Succeeded by: Ratna Bahadur Bista

3rd in Chief Justice of Nepal
- In office 14 December 1961 – 15 December 1963
- Appointed by: Mahendra Bir Bikram Shah Dev
- Preceded by: Anirudra Prasad Singh
- Succeeded by: Bhagwati Prashad Singh

Hari Prasad Pradhan was a Nepalese judge who served as 1st and 3rd Chief Justice of Nepal, in office between 10 August 1951 and 20 May 1956 and 14 December 1961 and 15 December 1963. He was the first Chief Justice of Nepal and the only jurist to hold the position for two terms. He was also the Chief Justice to allow woman lawyers in the country.
