= Cholendra Shumsher JB Rana =

29th Chief Justice of Nepal

The Rt Hon. Cholendra Shumsher Jung Bahadur Rana

27th Chief Justice of Nepal
- In office 2 January 2019 – 13 December 2022
- Appointed by: Bidya Devi Bhandari
- Preceded by: Om Prakash Mishra
- Succeeded by: Hari Krishna Karki

Personal details
- Born: 13 December 1957 (age 68) Kathmandu Ward no. 32, Kalikasthan
- Education: Tribhuvan University (LLB)

Cholendra Shumsher Jung Bahadur Rana (Nepali: चोलेन्द्र शम्शेर ज.ब.रा.) is a former chief justice of Nepal. He is the 29th Chief Justice of the Supreme Court of Nepal appointed and oathed by the President Bidya Devi Bhandari on the recommendation of Constitutional Council of Nepal on 2 January 2019. He was suspended from the court in 2022. He was detained by police in September 2026.

== Career ==
Designation	Organization	Tenure
Chief Justice	Supreme Court of Nepal	2 January 2019 – 13 December 2022
Justice	Supreme Court of Nepal	27 May 2014 – 2 January 2019
Acting Chief Judge	Appellate Court Butwal	15 April 2013 – 27 May 2014
Judge	Appellate Court Butwal	20 March 2013 – 15 April 2013
Judge	Appellate Court Rajbiraj	8 August 2011 – 20 March 2013
Judge	Appellate Court Pokhara	26 February 2009 – 8 August 2011
Judge	Appellate Court Dipayal	23 September 2008 – 26 February 2009
Member	Special Court	26 January 2006 – 23 September 2008
Judge	Appellate Court Surkhet	12 April 2005 – 26 January 2006
Additional Judge	Various Appellate Court	15 April 1996 – 12 April 2005
Advocate (Legal practice)	—N/a	22 November 1979 – 10 April 1996

== Awards ==
- Maha Ujwaol Rastradeep award from the President of Nepal in 2021

== See also ==
- Chief Justice of Nepal
- Deepak Raj Joshee
- Gopal Prasad Parajuli
