= Khatiwada (surname) =

Nepalese surname

Khatiwada (Nepali: खतिवडा) is a Nepali Khas Bahun surname found in Nepal and Sikkim. Khatiwada is a toponymic family name from Khatyadi gaun (Khatyadi village) in Doti district. They belong to Atri Gotra. Notable people with the surname include:

- Ishwor Prasad Khatiwada, Judge of the Supreme Court of Nepal
- N.B. Khatiwada, Veteran Sikkimese politician and Indian Supreme Court Lawyer
- Yuba Raj Khatiwada, Veteran economist, Ambassador of Nepal to the US, former Finance Minister, former deputy head of Planning commission and former Governor of Nepal Rastra Bank
- Shrinkhala Khatiwada, Miss Nepal World 2018 and Top 11 Miss World 2018
