= Ishwor Prasad Khatiwada =

Nepalese judge

- ईश्‍वर प्रसाद खतिवडा

Justice of Supreme Court of Nepal
- Incumbent
- Assumed office 1 August 2016

Personal details
- Born: March 1959 (age 67) Udayapur, Nepal
- Occupation: Judge

Ishwor Prasad Khatiwada (Nepali: ईश्‍वर प्रसाद खतिवडा) is currently a justice in the Supreme Court of Nepal. He has also served as General Secretary of the Judges Society.

== Early life and education ==
Ishwor Prasad Khatiwada was born on 7 March 1959 in Udayapur, Nepal. Khatiwada holds Bachelor of Law (LLB) and Master of Political Science from Tribhuwan University, Master of Laws in tax law and constitution from Punjab University, Chandigarh, India. He was also the research fellow at Danish Institute of Human Rights in 2004/2005.

== Judicial Career ==
Khatiwada began his career as a section officer at the Judicial Service Training Centre in 1983. He served as a government attorney from 1986 to 1993, after which he was appointed as a District Court Judge in 1993. Later, in 2005, he was promoted to the position of the Court of Appeals (High Court). On 1 August 2016, he was appointed as a Supreme Court Justice.

He was also a member of high-profile investigations, including cases such as the death of Madan Bhandari, former General Secretary of the Communist Party of Nepal and the Royal Massacre of 2001.

== Notable decisions ==
Khatiwada had written the 168-paged decision to appoint Sher Bahadur Deuba as the Prime Minister so that the House of Representatives can be restored. Khatiwada was the member of the Constitutional Bench of the Supreme Court that heard the writ petition against the dissolution of the House of Representatives. On 22 May, President Bidya Devi Bhandari had dissolved the House of Representatives for the second time in five months on the advice of Prime Minister KP Sharma Oli.

== See also ==
- Deepak Raj Joshee
- Gopal Prasad Parajuli
