= List of ambassadors of Nepal to China =

Coordinates: 39.942101°N 116.451354°E

Ambassador of Nepal to China
- Incumbent; Mahendra Bahadur Pandey since April 2020
- Inaugural holder: Daman Shumsher Jung Bahadur Rana
- Formation: 1956

The Nepali ambassador in Beijing is the official representative of the Government in Kathmandu to the Government of the People's Republic of China.

== List of representatives ==
Diplomatic agrément/Diplomatic accreditation	Ambassador	Observations	List of prime ministers of Nepal	Premier of the People's Republic of China	Term end
August 1, 1955		The governments in Kathmandu and Beijing establish diplomatic relations.	Mahendra of Nepal'	Zhou Enlai	
1956	Daman Shumsher Jung Bahadur Rana	With residence in New Delhi. (* September 26, 18,986): Lt. Gen. Descent of Jung Bahadur Rana.; In 1960 he was Nepalese Consul General in Lhasa.; In Feb. 26,1983 he became ambassador in New Delhi.; CIE (12.6.1947), CBE (m 27.11.1945).; Educated: Anglo-Bengali Sch, Allahabad, India, Tri-Chandra Coll, Katmandu, Nepal, and Presidency Coll, Calcutta (BA), Bengal, India.; 1923-1926 and 1932-1934 he was Judge, Court of Appeal.; 1926-1929 he was Governor of Banke and Bardia.; In 1933 he was promoted Lieut-Col.; From 1934-1947 he was Consul-Gen New Delhi.; prom Comdg Col 1939.; prom Lieut-Gen & temp cdr Nepalese contingent in India 1945. chargé d'Affaires at New Delhi 1947–1948.: Consul-Gen Calcutta 1948–1954.; From 1954 to 1956 he was Ambassador to the Court of St James with concurrent accreditation in Paris, The Hague and Washington, D.C..; From 1956 to 1961 he was ambassador to New Delhi and concurrent accredited to Japan 1956–1961, PRC 1956–1961, Ceylon 1957-1961 and Pakistan 1960-1961).; In 1972 he became member of the Royal Nepal Academy.; A Sanskrit author and poet under the name Dhanasamsera Ja. Ba. Ra.: Author of “Tantra-sastra” (1961), “Prabuddhasanatanarahasyam” (1963) “Agnisthapanavidhih” (1970), “Vivahapaddhati: Nepalibhashasahita” (1970), “Matrrkaksara-rahasyam” (1973), “Saradiyadurgapujapaddhatih” (1975), “Mantravidyarahasyam” (1977), “Nepal: Rule and Misrule” (1978), “Kamakalarahasya” (1979), “Kularnava-rahasya” (1989).; Decorations: The Orders the Three Divine Powers 1st class (1938), the Gurkha Right Hand 1st class (1953), and the Star of Nepal 3rd class (1945), the Brilliant Star of China (1956), 39/45 Star, British War and India Service (1945) medals, etc. m. a daughter of Thahila Sri Sahebju Bir Bikram Shah, sometime Chair Advisory Assembly.: His son is Subarna Shamsher Jang Bahadur Rana.	Tanka Prasad Acharya	Zhou Enlai	1961
1961	Keshar Bahadur Khatri Chhetri (KC).	Residency in China	Tulsi Giri	Zhou Enlai	1965
1965	Ranadhir Suba		Surya Bahadur Thapa	Zhou Enlai	1974
1974	Chhetra Bikram Rana	Major General	Nagendra Prasad Rijal	Zhou Enlai	1978
1978	Yadunath Khanal		Kirti Nidhi Bista	Hua Guofeng	1982
July 14, 1982	Guna Shumsher Jung Bahadur Rana	General	Surya Bahadur Thapa	Zhao Ziyang	1986
1986	Nayan Bahadur Khatri		Nagendra Prasad Rijal	Zhao Ziyang	1991
November 1, 1991	Basudev Chandra Malla		Girija Prasad Koirala	Li Peng	January 1, 1995
February 1, 1995	Tulsi Lal Amatya		Sher Bahadur Deuba	Li Peng	December 1, 1995
April 1, 1996	Yubaraj Singh Pradhan		Sher Bahadur Deuba	Li Peng	August 1, 1998
October 1, 1998	Rajeshwar Acharya		Girija Prasad Koirala	Zhu Rongji	January 1, 2003
May 1, 2003	Narendra Raj Pandey		Surya Bahadur Thapa	Wen Jiabao	June 1, 2006
November 15, 2007	Tanka Prasad Karki		Girija Prasad Koirala	Wen Jiabao	December 1, 2011
March 1, 2012	Mahesh Kumar Maskey		Baburam Bhattarai	Wen Jiabao	May 1, 2016
September 1, 2016	Leela Mani Paudyal		Pushpa Kamal Dahal	Li Keqiang	April 2020
April 2020	Mahendra Bahadur Pandey		KP Sharma Oli	Li Keqiang	
