= Kedar Prasad Giri =

Former Chief Justice of Nepal

Former Hon'ble Kedar Prasad Giri

18th in Chief Justice of Nepal
- In office 5 October 2007 – 7 May 2009
- Appointed by: Girija Prasad Koirala
- Preceded by: Dilip Kumar Poudel
- Succeeded by: Min Bahadur Rayamajhi

Personal details
- Born: May 7, 1944 Mahottari
- Died: November 23, 2018 (aged 74)

Kedar Prasad Giri (May 7, 1944 - November 23, 2018) was a Nepalese judge who served as 18th Chief Justice of Nepal, in office from 5 October 2007 to 7 May 2009. He was appointed by Girija Prasad Koirala.

He was preceded by Dilip Kumar Poudel and succeeded by Min Bahadur Rayamajhi.
