= Shree Krishna Bhattarai =

Biography of Nepali judge

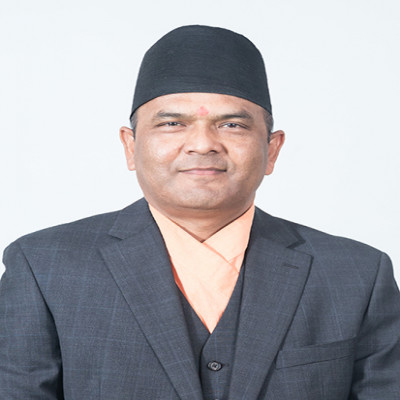
- Occupation: Former District Judge

Shree Krishna Bhattarai is a former judge who served at the Arghakhanchi District Court in Nepal. He gained public attention when he resigned from his position in protest of the appointment of Hari Krishna Karki as Chief Justice of Nepal's Supreme Court.

Bhattarai has also served as the Election Officer for Gandaki Province by Nepal's Election Commission for the 2022 National Assembly elections. Bhattarai also holds a PhD in Cyber Law and is considered an expert in this field.

== Personal life ==
Bhattarai married Mithu Bhattarai in 1985 when he was 15 years old. He later married Sharada Silwal in 1999. Bhattarai had one son with Silwal who died in 2021.

== Resignation ==
In his resignation statement, Bhattarai alleged that the Parliamentary Hearing Committee failed to properly vet Karki before his appointment as Chief Justice. Bhattarai had previously lodged a 26-page complaint against Karki's recommendation for the position, demanding that Karki be cross-examined in the Hearing Committee with proceedings broadcast publicly. The complaint accused Karki of being improperly recommended in the absence of standard procedures and oversight.
