= Ram Raj Pant =

Nepalese linguist (1920–1993)

- रामराज पन्त
- Born: Feb 1920; Kathmandu, Nepal
- Died: January 1, 1993 (aged 72)
- Education: Patna University, Tri Chandra College, Banaras Hindu University
- Spouse: Pushpa Kumari Pant
- Writing career
- Language: Nepali
- Notable works: Nepali Linguistic Science (नेपाली भाषा बिज्ञान), Nepali Writing System (नेपाली लिपि विज्ञान); Establishment of Nepal Law Campus
- Literary movement: Nepali Simplification (सजिलोबाद)

Prof. Ram Raj Pant (1920–1993) was a pioneering linguist of the Nepali language, literary writer and promoter of legal education in Nepal. In addition to publishing multiple volumes on Nepali linguistics, Ram Raj Pant led the establishment of Nepal Law College and was its founding Principal. Nepal Law College later became Nepal Law Campus under the Tribhuvan University.

He was also the founding chairman and first visiting professor of Nepali language program at Banaras Hindu University. One of his books - Nepali Lipivijana is continued to be used for MA in Nepali curriculum at BHU.

== Biography ==
Ram Raj Pant was born in Gyaneshwor, Kathmandu, Nepal in February 1920 (Bikram Sambat 1976 Falgun) to his father Bhairav Raj Pant and mother Dambar Kumari. He was born as Hridaya Nath Pant. When his mother died when he was only eight years old, the responsibility of looking after his two younger brothers - Chandra Raj and Surya Raj came on his shoulders. Under guidance from his grandfather, Gajendra Dhoj Pant, Ram Raj enrolled in Durbar High School for his early schooling. His upanayan was also completed when he was eight years old.

Ram Raj continued his education at Patna University from where he completed his matriculation. Then he returned to Kathmandu to enroll in then newly established Tri Chandra College, from where he received his IA degree. He returned afterwards to Patna University for further study towards receiving his BA degree in 1939. Ram Raj then enrolled in law program at Banaras Hindu University, from where he received his Bachelor of Laws in 1941. Influenced by his grandfather Gajendra Dhoj, who studied philosophy and literature, and by the well known literary culture of Banaras, Ram Raj started writing while there. He also studied linguistics at BHU to receive his Master's degree in 1943.

After graduation, Ram Raj continued literary writing as well as his research on linguistics, especially related to the Nepali language. While living in Kathmandu, Ram Raj continued to visit Banaras every year for most of his life to continue his research and intellectual endeavors.

Ram Raj was married when he was 18 years of age to Pushpa Kumari of Bista family from Maligaun in Kathmandu. Between them, they had five sons - Shiva Raj, Ananda Raj, Durga Raj, Rajendra Raj and Binayak Raj Pant as well as two daughters - Prabha Pandey and Prativa Tiwari.

== Career ==
Ram Raj Pant made teaching and writing into his passionate profession. In 1943, he was the founding visiting professor of Nepali program at Banaras Hindu University, which continues to use one of Ram Raj's book on linguistics in its MA program. After completing his role in BHU, Ram Raj returned to Nepal to further the cause of education in his native country. He was offered the position of chief inspector of higher education by then Nepal government, which allowed him to visit academic institutions in many parts of the country. In 1947, he took on the position of professor and head of Nepali language department at Tri Chandra College, where he later started the BA honors program.

Ram Raj Pant led the initiative to establish the first institution for legal education in Nepal. Nepal Law College was formed under his leadership in 1954 and Ram Raj was its founding Principal. The classes were initially held in the evenings at Durbar High School. Ram Raj's relentless efforts also helped secure the college its own site on Exhibition Road in Kathmandu where it stands today. Nepal Law College was renamed to Nepal Law Campus when it was later brought under the faculty of law at Tribhuvan University. Ram Raj worked for next two decades as Principal of Nepal Law Campus to build it into a solid academic institution that produced graduates who went on to become leaders of many organizations in Nepal and abroad.

Ram Raj Pant is credited with starting the Nepali grammar simplification movement (Nepali: सजिलोबाद) in 1959. He also established the curriculum for MA program in Nepali language at Tribhuvan University in 1961. After his retirement from Tribhuvan University in 1975, Ram Raj continued to write and advise various institutions to further the cause of education and the system of rule of law in Nepal.

== Publications ==
- Editor of Tri Chandra College publication Jyotsna (Nepali: सम्पादक, ज्योत्सना पत्रिका), 1948–1953
- Nepali Linguistic Science, Vol. 1 (Nepali: नेपाली भाषा विज्ञान (पहिलो भाग)), Feb 1958 (Bikram Sambat 2014 Falgun)
- Nepali Linguistic Science (Nepali: नेपाली भाषा विज्ञान) (Bikram Sambat 2036 Falgun) Publisher: Royal Nepal Academy
- Nepali Writing System (Nepali: नेपाली लिपि विज्ञान), 1959 (Bikram Sambat 2016 Falgun) Publisher: Jagadamba Publication
- History of Linguistics (Nepali: भाषा विज्ञानको इतिहास), 1962 (Bikram Sambat 2018)
- Essay collection, Part 1 (Nepali: प्रबन्ध पाठ सङ्ग्रह, भाग १), 1961 (Bikram Sambat 2018)
- Collection of stories (Nepali: बेवारिसी, पाल्तु र फाल्तु), 1963 (Bikram Sambat 2019)
- Nepali Linguistic Science (Nepali: नेपाली भाषा विज्ञान), 1979 (Bikram Sambat 2036)
- Nepal Legal Framework (Nepali: नेपाल कानुन सार), 1979 (Bikram Sambat 2036)
- One-act plays (Nepali: चट्टुको चट, चन्द्रको पालो)
- Poem collection (Nepali: कहिले जाला घाम, मातृ भू भव्य बनोस)
- Nepali Language in Tribhuvan University (Nepali: त्रिभुवन बिश्वविधालयमा नेपाली भाषा)
- Innovative Educational System, with Yadhunandan (Nepali: नवीन शिक्षण पद्धति), (Bikram Sambat 2014)
