= Damodar Prasad Sharma =

Nepalese Chief Justice (born 1949)

Damodar Prasad Sharma (born October 10, 1949) was the Chief Justice of Nepal from 11 April 2014 to 19 October 2014. He was preceded by Khil Raj Regmi succeeded by Ram Kumar Shah.
