= Hari Krishna Karki =

30th Chief Justice of Nepal

The Rt Hon. Hari Krishna Karki हरिकृष्ण कार्की

Chief Justice of Supreme Court of Nepal
- In office 16 June 2023 – 4 August 2023
- Appointed by: Ram Chandra Poudel (President of Nepal)
- Preceded by: Cholendra Shumsher JBR
- Succeeded by: Bishowambhar Prasad Shrestha

Personal details
- Born: August 4, 1958 (age 68) Okhaldhunga, Nepal

Hari Krishna Karki (Nepali: हरिकृष्ण कार्की) is a former chief justice of Nepal. He was appointed by the president on the recommendation of the Constitutional Council of Nepal. He was administered oath as the 30th chief justice of Nepal by Ram Chandra Poudel, President of Nepal, on 16 June 2023. He served as a chief justice of the Supreme Court of Nepal from 16 June 2023 to 4 August 2023.

== See also ==
- Deepak Raj Joshee
- Gopal Prasad Parajuli
