= Mahendra Bahadur Pandey =

Nepali politician

- महेन्द्र बहादुर पाण्डे
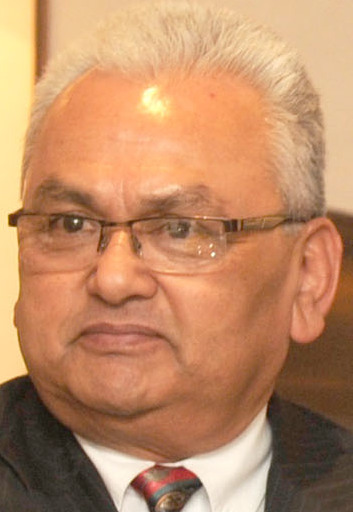
- Mahendra Bahadur Pandey in 2014

Minister of Foreign Affairs
- In office 25 February 2014 – 12 October 2015
- President: Ram Baran Yadav
- Prime Minister: Sushil Koirala
- Vice President: Paramananda Jha
- Preceded by: Madhav Prasad Ghimire
- Succeeded by: Kamal Thapa

Ambassador of Nepal to China
- Incumbent
- Assumed office April 2020

Personal details
- Party: Communist Party of Nepal (Unified Marxist-Leninist)

Mahendra Bahadur Pandey is a Nepalese politician and diplomat. A politburo member of the Communist Party of Nepal (Unified Marxist-Leninist), on 25 February 2014 he assumed the post of the Minister for Foreign Affairs of Nepal under Sushil Koirala-led government. Since April 2020, he is the Ambassador of Nepal to China. Due to the COVID-19 pandemic, he assumed his post from Kathmandu until September 2020.

== Personal life ==
Pandey was born to father Fatta Bahadur Pandey and mother Bishnu Maya Pandey in Likhu, Nuwakot, Nepal in May 1948.

He earned his Bachelor of Education (B. Ed.) in English, M.Ed from Tribhuwan University of Nepal. He studied Conflict Management from Ulster University, N.Ireland. He holds a Bachelor of Law (LLB) too. He served as the Associate Professor of English in Tribhuvan University for 20 years from 1975 to 1995.

He is married to Mrs Bhim Kumari Thapa. They have a daughter, Liberty, and a son, Wisdom.

== Political career ==
Since his student life, he was deeply inspired to fight for the democratic rights of the Nepalese people and for the just and equitable society. That drew him to the leftist movement in 1966. Later on, he joined the Communist Party of Nepal in 1977. He was eventually elected to the House of Representatives for Nuwakot District in 1999 and served as the Chief Whip of his party from 2006 to 2007.

He also served as the Member Secretary of Social Welfare Council in 1995.

Apart from his cabinet responsibility, he holds the post of the Chief of Education and Human Resource Department of the Communist Party of Nepal (Unified Marxist-Leninist).
