= Dhanendra Bahadur Singh =

Former Chief Justice of Nepal

Former Hon'ble Dhanendra Bahadur Singh

7th in Chief Justice of Nepal
- In office 11 December 1985 – 7 August 1991
- Appointed by: Birendra Bir Bikram Shah Dev
- Preceded by: Nayan Bahadur Khatri
- Succeeded by: Bishwonath Upadhyaya

Dhanendra Bahadur Singh was a Nepalese judge who served as 7th Chief Justice of Nepal, in office from 11 December 1985 to 7 August 1991. He was appointed by the then-king of Nepal, Birendra.

Singh was preceded by Nayan Bahadur Khatri and succeeded by Bishwonath Upadhyaya.
