= Leela Mani Paudyal =

Nepalese civil servant

Leela Mani Poudyal
- लिलामणि पौडेल
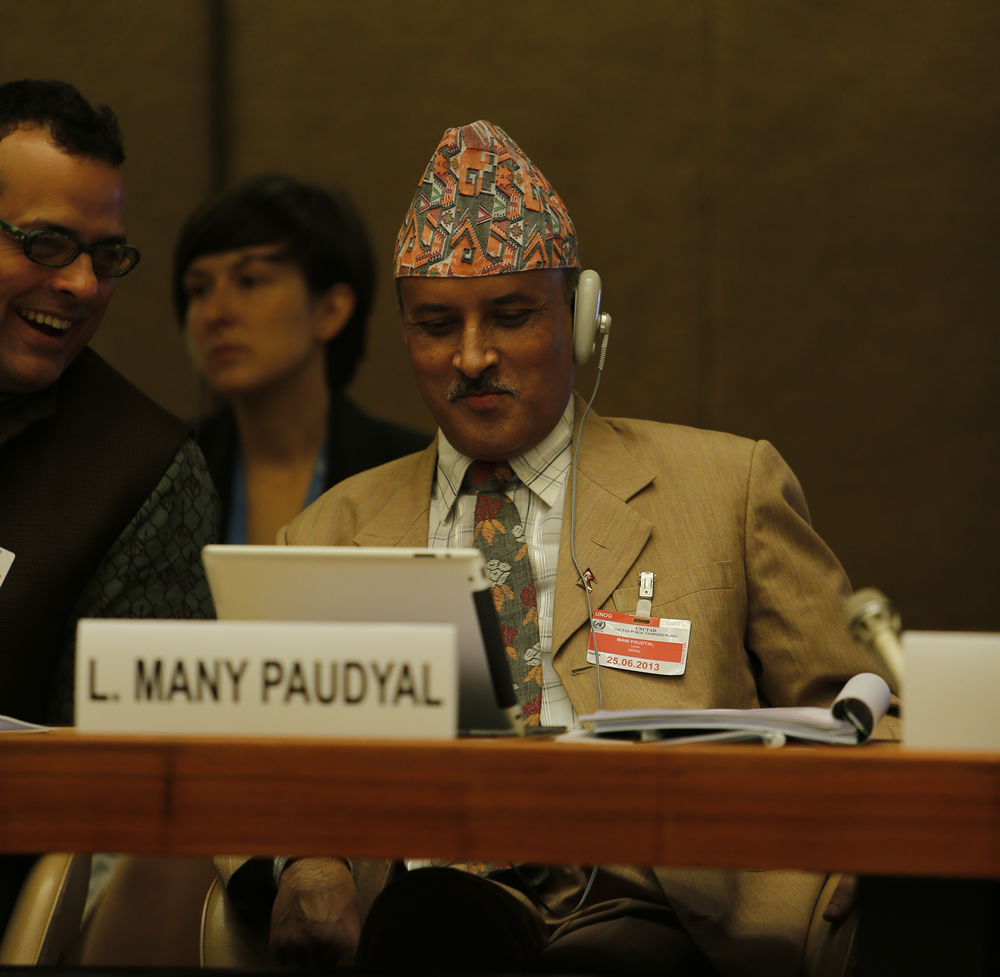

Chief Secretary of the Government of Nepal
- In office September 7, 2012 – September 6, 2015
- Prime Minister: Baburam Bhattarai; Khil Raj Regmi; Sushil Koirala
- Preceded by: Madhav Ghimire
- Succeeded by: Som Lal Subedi

Personal details
- Born: Baletaksar-5, Gulmi, Nepal
- Education: Tribhuvan University

Leela Mani Poudyal served as Chief Secretary of the Government of Nepal between 2012 and 2015. Poudyal is a popular leader with his strict civil service motto, and his social campaigns like anti-graft movement and "Clean Bagmati Campaign" that he started entirely through his own initiative. He remains to be a popular figure in Nepalese socio-political scenario, actively taking part in discussions, talk-shows and social movements.

On 1 September 2016, Government of Nepal announced the nomination of Poudyal as ambassador to people's Republic of China. He is also the Non-resident Ambassador to Mongolia and North Korea.

== Early life and education ==
Born in western district of Gulmi, Poudyal went to a local Primary School. He passed the School Leaving Certificate (SLC) examinations in 1979 from Shree Bhawani High School Kusumkhola, Palpa.

Poudyal passed B. Com. (major subject Financial Management with Gold Medal) in 1988. He then completed Master's in Business Administration (MBA) from the Tribhuwan University in 1989 with First Division.

== Career ==
Poudyal joined the Nepalese civil service in 1988 as a Gazetted Class Third Officer in the Financial Comptroller General Office. He was promoted to Under Secretary in 1996. He worked as chief of the Personnel Administration Section in the Ministry of Local Development from August 1996 to February 1998. He was promoted to Joint Secretary in 1998 and worked in various ministries and departments including Industrial Promotion and Administration Division in the Ministry of Industry Commerce and Supplies, Director General at the Department of Cottage and Small Industries and Ministry of Commerce.

Poudyal worked as Chairperson in state-owned Hetauda Cement Factory (September 2002 to May 2003); Liquidator of Hetauda Textile Mill (the largest state-owned Textile mill); Chairperson and Board Member of Cottage and Small Industry Development Board (2000-2003), Chairperson of state-owned Lumbini Sugar Mill Ltd (September 2002 – October 2003); Board member of Salt Trading Corporation, a semi state-owned company to supply essential commodities, National Program Director of Micro Enterprise Development Program- a UNDP funded Poverty alleviation Program (2002-2003) and Convener/ Team Leader of more than two dozen Task forces, committees and teams formed by the Government of Nepal. He worked as Consular General for Tibet Autonomous Region of China (November 2003- July 2007).

He worked as Secretary at the Minister of Culture, Tourism and Civil Aviation, Ministry of Information and Communications, Ministry of Home and also at the Office of Prime Minister and Council of Ministers between 2007 and 2012.

=== Chief Secretary ===
Poudyal held the post of Chief Secretary, the highest-ranked official in Nepal's civil services from September 7, 2012 to September 6, 2015. During this time, he played important role in successful integration of the Maoists combatants into Nepal army through a long and arduous process.

== Bagmati Clean-up Campaign ==
Poudyal played a key role (and continues to play) in the Bagmati River clean –up campaign, that was launched in June 2013. Bagmati River is a major river in the capital, Kathmandu, with great ecological and religious importance. But, due to haphazard urbanization, pollution and lack of proper planning, the river had almost turned into a sewer. With like-minded individuals and organizations as well as concerned government department and agencies, Poudyal played a key role in the Campaign. The Campaign has already completed 170 weeks (by August 2016) and has been instrumental in raising public awareness and removing garbage from the holy river, pressing government for sewerage treatment plants, making gardens in the river banks and plantation of trees. With the initiation of Bagmati campaigners Dhobikhola, Bishnumati, Nakkhu, Hanumante River clean up campaigns have been launched and continued. The campaign has reached throughout the nation.

== Personal life ==
Poudyal now lives in Kathmandu with his family. He lists his hobbies as travelling and regularly practices Yoga and Meditation.
