= Lok Darshan Regmi =

Nepali civil servant and diplomat (born 1966)

- लोकदर्शन रेग्मी

Chief Secretary of Nepal
- In office 25 October 2017 – 30 September 2020
- Preceded by: Rajendra Kishor Chhetri
- Succeeded by: Shanker Das Bairagi

Ambassador of Nepal to the United Kingdom
- In office 1 March 2021 – 24 October 2021

Ambassador of Nepal to the United States
- Incumbent
- Assumed office 21 March 2025
- Preceded by: Sridhar Khatri

Personal details
- Born: November 16, 1966 (age 59) Syangja, Nepal
- Spouse: Chandra K. Regmi
- Education: Tribhuvan University (M.P.A.)

Lok Darshan Regmi (Nepali: लोकदर्शन रेग्मी; born 16 November 1966) is a Nepali civil servant and diplomat who is serving as the Ambassador of Nepal to the United States since 2025. He previously served as the Chief Secretary of Nepal from 2017 to 2020 and as the Ambassador of Nepal to the United Kingdom in 2021.

== Early life and education ==
Regmi was born on 16 November 1966 in Syangja District, Nepal. He earned a Master’s Degree in Public Administration from Tribhuvan University.

== Career ==
Regmi entered the civil service in 1995 and has held several important posts, including:

- Section Officer, Ministry of Home Affairs (1995–2001)
- Under Secretary, Ministry of Forest and Soil Conservation (2002–2005)
- Joint Secretary, Budget and Program Division, Ministry of Finance (2006–2013)
- Regional Administrator, Western Regional Administration Office (2013–2014)
- Secretary, Ministry of Land Reform and Management (2014–2015)
- Finance Secretary, Ministry of Finance (2015–2016)
- Home Secretary, Ministry of Home Affairs (2016–2017)
- Chief Secretary of Nepal (2017–2020)
- Ambassador of Nepal to the United Kingdom (2021)
- Ambassador of Nepal to the United States (2025–present)

== Honors ==
- Janasewa Shree Third, Government of Nepal (2013)
- Prasiddha Prabal Jana Sewa Shree, Government of Nepal (2018)

== Personal life ==
He is married and has two children. His permanent residence is in Walling Municipality-7, Syangja.

== See also ==
- Chief Secretary of Nepal
- Government of Nepal

Diplomatic posts
Preceded by Sridhar Khatri	Ambassador of Nepal to the United States; 2025–present	Incumbent
Preceded by Durga Bahadur Subedi	Ambassador of Nepal to the United Kingdom; 2021	Succeeded by Gyan Chandra Acharya
Preceded by Rajendra Kishor Chhetri	Chief Secretary of Nepal; 2017–2020	Succeeded by Shanker Das Bairagi
