= Ganesh Prasad Timilsina =

Nepali politician

The Right Honourable Ganesh Prasad Timilsina
- गणेशप्रसाद तिमिल्सिना
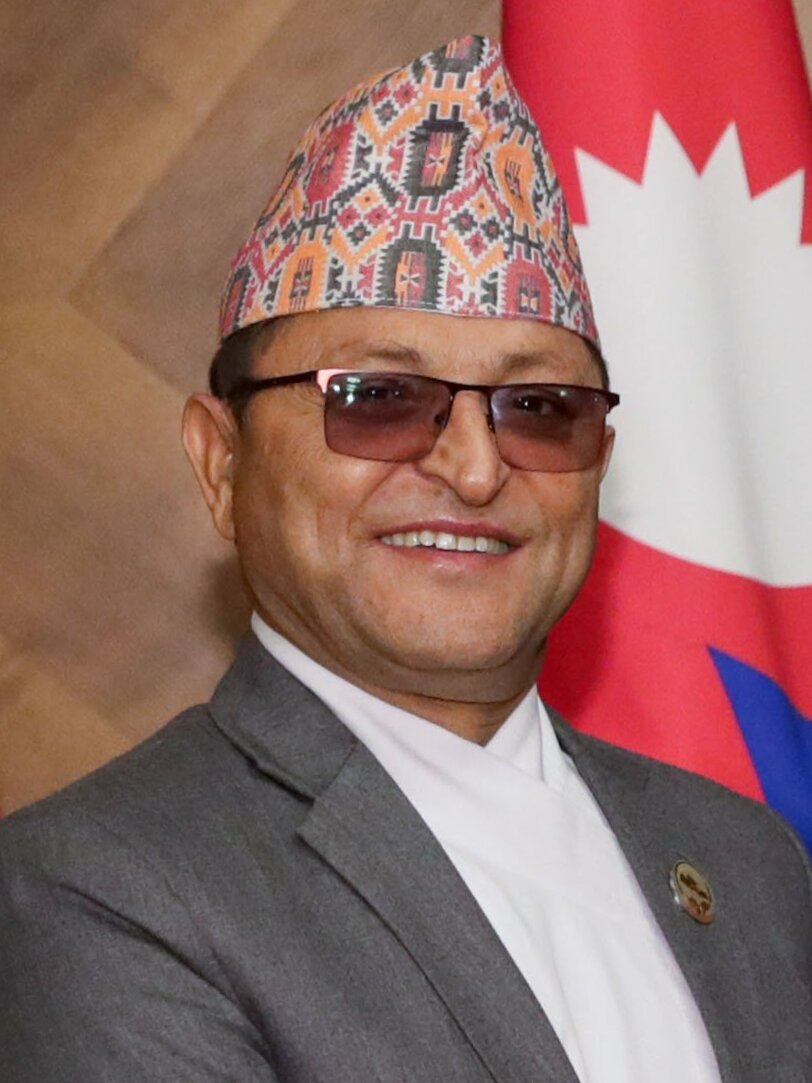
- Timilsina in 2023

Chairperson of the National Assembly
- In office 15 March 2018 – 3 March2024
- President: Bidya Devi Bhandari; Ram Chandra Poudel
- Deputy: Shashikala Dahal; Urmila Aryal
- Preceded by: Mohammad Mohsin as Parliament of the Kingdom of Nepal; Position established
- Succeeded by: Narayan Prasad Dahal

Personal details
- Born: 10 December 1960 (age 65) Modi Rural Municipality-7, Parbat, Gandaki Province, Nepal
- Party: Communist Party of Nepal (Unified Marxist–Leninist)
- Parents: Tulasi Prasad Timilsina (father); Hira Devi Timilsina (mother)

Ganesh Prasad Timilsina (Nepali: गणेश प्रसाद तिमिल्सिना) is a Nepalese politician, belonging to the Communist Party of Nepal (Unified Marxist–Leninist). In the 2018 National Assembly election he was elected from the Gandaki Province. He was subsequently appointed as Chairperson of the National Assembly and served from 15 March 2018 till 4 March 2024.

== See also ==
- Krishna Bahadur Mahara
- National Assembly
