= Anup Raj Sharma =

Former Chief Justice of Nepal

Anup Raj Sharma is Nepalese jurist who served as the 20th Chief Justice of Nepal from 14 December 2010 to 25 March 2010. He was preceded by Min Bahadur Rayamajhi and succeeded by Ram Prasad Shrestha. He was appointed chairperson of the National Human Rights Commission (NHRC) in 2014.
