= Kalpana Bista =

Former Minister of Nepal

The Honourable Kalpana Bista
- श्रीमती कल्पना बिष्ट

Minister of Education, Science and Technology
- In office 22 December 1978 – 11 October 1981
- Appointed by: Birendra Bir Bikram Shah Dev

Personal details
- Born: Kalpana Rana; 15 April 1905 Kathmandu, Nepal
- Died: 11 June 2001 (aged 96) Zürich, Switzerland
- Spouse: Tej Pratap Bista
- Education: AB
- Alma mater: Somerville College; University of Oxford
- Awards: Gorkha Dakshin Bahu

Kalpana Bista (15 April 1905 – 11 June 2001) was the first female minister of education of Nepal in 1978.

She was born in Kathmandu to an aristocratic family in the Rana Dynasty. Bista was appointed by late King Birendra of Nepal and late Prime Minister Surya Bahadur Thapa as the minister of education as well as the member of the Office of the secretariat and parliament on multiple occasions.

She was also appointed as a lifetime member of the child welfare committee of the state of Uttarakhand in India.

== Personal life ==
She was married in to the Bista family that originates in the far western region of Nepal.

Many members of her family including her son and father-in-law as well as most of her brother-in-laws have held public office in the government of Nepal. Her son Lok Pratap Bista was also appointed by King Mahendra of Nepal as the Minister of Forestry and Agriculture.
