= Mahendra Bahadur Bista =

Nepali politician

Honourable Mahendra Bahadur Bista महेन्द्रबहादुर विष्ट

Director General of the Ministry of Health and Population
- In office 8 October 2005 – 11 December 2009
- President: Ram Baran Yadav
- Prime Minister: Girija Prasad Koirala

Personal details
- Born: April 21, 1949 (age 76) Dadeldhura, Nepal

Mahendra Bahadur Bista (born 21 April 1949) is a Nepali politician and scientist. He has held the position of director general of the government's Department of Health (DOH) and the director of Nepal's Epidemiological and Disease Control Division position implementing modern maternity care and disease control in rural parts of the country. He is the nephew of Ratna Bahadur Bista.
