= Anirudra Prasad Singh =

Former Chief Justice of Nepal (c.1920–2020)

Former Hon'ble Anirudra Prasad Singh
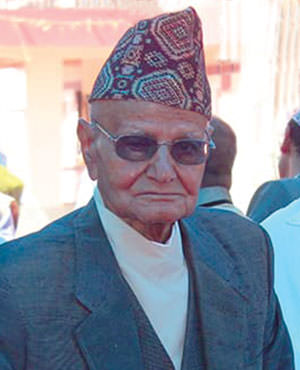

2nd in Chief Justice of Nepal
- In office 21 May 1956 – 29 June 1959
- Appointed by: Mahendra Bir Bikram Shah Dev
- Preceded by: Hari Prasad Pradhan
- Succeeded by: Hari Prasad Pradhan

Personal details
- Born: c. 1920
- Died: September 15, 2020 (aged 100) Battisputli, Kathmandu

Anirudra Prasad Singh (c. 1920 – September 15, 2020) was a Nepalese judge who served as 2nd Chief Justice of Nepal, in office from 21 May 1956 to 29 June 1959. He was appointed by the then-king of Nepal, Mahendra. He was also a former public service commission head and minister of law and forests.

Singh was preceded by Hari Prasad Pradhan and succeeded by Hari Prasad Pradhan.
