= Bhagwati Prashad Singh =

Former Chief Justice of Nepal

Former Hon'ble Bhagwati Prashad Singh
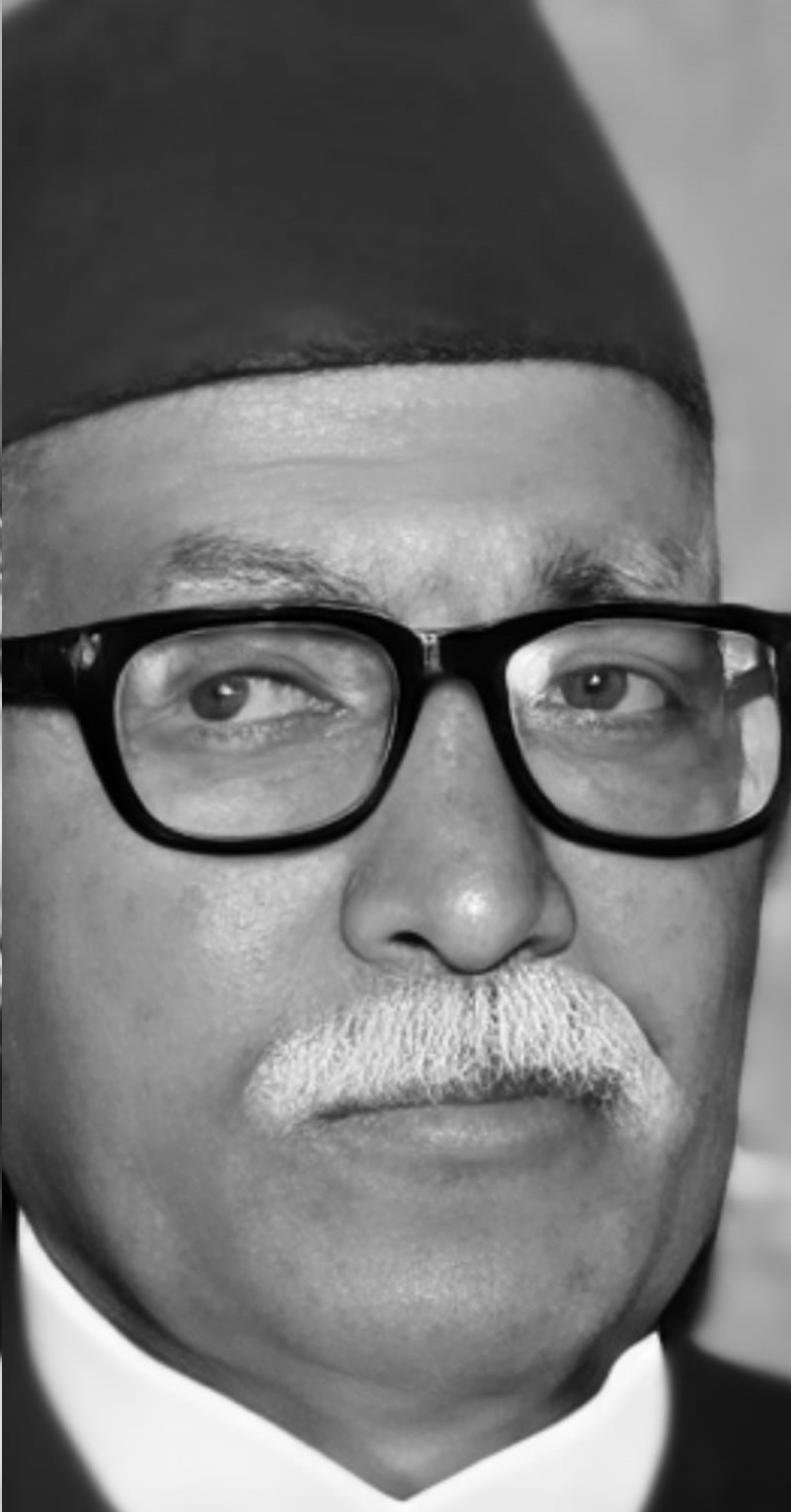
- From a legislative conference

4th in Chief Justice of Nepal
- In office 9 April 1964 – 10 July 1970
- Appointed by: Mahendra Bir Bikram Shah Dev
- Preceded by: Hari Prasad Pradhan
- Succeeded by: Ratna Bahadur Bista

Bhagwati Prashad Singh was a Nepalese judge who served as 4th Chief Justice of Nepal, in office from 9 April 1964 to 10 July 1970. He was appointed by the then-king of Nepal, Mahendra.

Singh was preceded by Hari Prasad Pradhan and succeeded by Ratna Bahadur Bista.
