= Constitutional Council (Nepal) =

Constitutional body of Government of Nepal

Constiutional Council of Nepal
- संवैधानिक परिषद्

Agency overview
- Formed: 1990
- Type: Constitutional Body
- Agency executive: Prime Minister of Nepal

The Constitutional Council of Nepal is a constitutional body established under Article 284 of the Constitution of Nepal. Its primary mandate is to recommend candidates for the appointment of the Chief Justice and Chiefs and officials of the Constitutional Bodies in accordance with the Constitution. The council consists of six members, chaired by the Prime Minister.

The member of the Constitutional Council includes:

- The Prime Minister
- The Chief Justice
- The Speaker of the House of Representatives
- The Chairperson of the National Assembly
- Leader of Opposition Party in the House of Representatives
- Deputy Speaker the House of Representatives

== Roles and Duties ==
Under Article 284 of the Constitution of Nepal, 2015, the Constitutional Council is mandated to play a central role in the recommendation and facilitation of appointments to key constitutional offices, including the Chief Justice of Nepal and the heads and officials of constitutional bodies.

In carrying out its function of recommending the appointment of the Chief Justice, the Council includes the Minister for Law and Justice as a member, ensuring representation from the executive branch in the selection process.

The Council is constitutionally required to make such recommendations at least one month prior to the expected vacancy of the office, thereby ensuring continuity and avoiding institutional gaps. In circumstances where a vacancy arises unexpectedly due to events such as death or resignation, the Council is obligated to initiate the recommendation process in a manner that ensures the position is filled within one month of the vacancy occurring.

The Constitution further provides that the detailed functions, powers, duties, and procedural arrangements for appointments to the Chief Justice and other constitutional offices shall be regulated by federal law. The functioning of the council is governed by the Constitutional Council (Functions, Duties, Powers and Procedures) Act.

Additionally, the administrative functioning of the Council is supported by the Chief Secretary of the Government of Nepal, who serves as its secretary, thereby facilitating coordination and record-keeping of its proceedings.

== Current Members of the Constitution Council ==
Chairperson and Members of the Constitutional Council as per Constitiution of Nepal
Members	Portfolio	Office
Balendra Shah	Chairperson	Prime Minister of Nepal
Manoj Kumar Sharma	Member	Chief Justice of Nepal
Dol Prasad Aryal	Member	Speaker of the House of Representatives
Narayan Prasad Dahal	Member	Chairperson of the National Assembly
Bhishma Raj Angdembe	Member	Leader of the Opposition Party
Ruby Kumari Thakuri	Member	Deputy Speaker of the House of Representatives
