= Ram Kumar Shah =

Chief Justice of Nepal (2014–2015)

Ram Kumar Shah (born 8 July 1950) was the Chief Justice of Nepal from 10 October 2014 to 7 July 2015.

== Career ==
Shah joined Judicial Service as Section Officer in 1974 and was appointed district judge in 1976. He served as district judge from 1976 till 1986. He was district government attorney, Kathmandu, from September 7, 1979, to February 16, 1981.

He was appointed as a Zonal Court Judge in 1986 and worked at various Zonal Courts of Nepal up to 1991. In 1990, after promulgation of the then Constitution of the Kingdom of Nepal, he was appointed Judge of the Appellate Court in 1991 and judged at various Appellate Court till 2004. He moved on as Chief Judge of Appellate Court in 2004 and swore the oath to serve as Justice of the Supreme Court of Nepal in 2005.

He was preceded by Justice Kalyan Shrestha.
