= Jana Aastha National Weekly =

Nepali Newspaper

- Type: Weekly newspaper
- Format: Print, online
- Owner: Aastha Prakashan Pvt Ltd.
- Founded: 1993
- Political alignment: Left Wing
- Language: Nepali
- Website: janaaastha.com

The Jana Aastha National Weekly is a weekly tabloid published in Nepal.It generally publishes opinions and breaking news stories.Its background is tilted to the left ideology but it is known for exposing the irregularities of the left movement as well & believes in positive reporting for peace & development.Jana Astha has the largest circulation among the weeklies all over the country and it leads 80 percent of the print media of Nepal, this has been certified by the Nepalese government's Audit Bureau of Circulation (ABC). It"s editor in chief Kishor Shrestha had represented editors in Regulatory body Press Council Nepal as chairman for 3 & half years, which is an active member of the World Association of Press Councils (WAPC).He is currently the secretary general of world association of press councils (WAPC).He was jailed twice during the autocratic Panchayat regime.Shrestha has worked in the media sector for more than 36 years and served as an advisor to the ministry of information & communications in 1998, he started career in media profession while he was 16 years old, Jana Astha has a history of over 30 years which has its own online newsportal www.janaaastha.com. You may have access of jana aastha news through the platform of social medias like facebook, X, Tiktok, blue sky & instagram. Jana Aastha online has 36 K likes & 46 K Followers in facebook likewise 9168 followers & 200K likes in Tiktok. (Updated on 2024 november 27)

== Controversy ==
In May 2026, a controversy emerged in Nepal after a leaked audio involving Jana Aastha Weekly Chairman Kishor Shrestha and former Home Minister Sudhan Gurung was shared publicly by a Facebook page called “Youth of Birgunj.” The audio allegedly suggests that Shrestha accepted money to publish a report against Gurung, while Shrestha denied the accusations, claiming it was a planned conspiracy aimed at damaging his reputation by involving Chinese nationals. The Chinese Embassy in Nepal also responded, calling for an impartial investigation into the matter.
