= Min Bahadur Rayamajhi =

Former Chief Justice of Nepal

Former Hon'ble Min Bahadur Rayamajhi

19th in Chief Justice of Nepal
- In office 8 May 2009 – 10 February 2010
- Appointed by: Ram Baran Yadav
- Preceded by: Kedar Prasad Giri
- Succeeded by: Anup Raj Sharma

Min Bahadur Rayamajhi was a Nepalese judge who served as 19th Chief Justice of Nepal, in office from 8 May 2009 to 10 February 2010. He was appointed by the then-president of Nepal, Ram Baran Yadav.

He was preceded by Kedar Prasad Giri and succeeded by Anup Raj Sharma.
