= Pipaladi =

Coordinates: 28°53′N 80°20′E

Pipaladi पिपलाडी
- Village development committee
- Interactive map of Pipaladi
- Country: Nepal
- Province: Sudurpashchim Province
- District: Kanchanpur District

Population (1991)
  - Total: 11,071
- Time zone: UTC+5:45 (Nepal Time)

Pipaladi is a village development committee in Kanchanpur District in Sudurpashchim Province of south-western Nepal. At the time of the 1991 Nepal census it had a population of 11,071 people living in 1739 individual households.
