= Nepal hostage crisis =

2004 event in Iraq

- Part of the Iraq War
- Location: Iraq
- Date: 09:00, 1 August 2004 – 31 August 2004
- Target: Twelve Nepalis in Iraq
- Attack type: Hostage-taking
- Deaths: 12 hostages
- Perpetrator: Jamaat Ansar al-Sunna

The Nepal hostage crisis began on 19 August 2004 when an Iraqi Sunni insurgent group, Jamaat Ansar al-Sunna kidnapped and murdered twelve Nepalis.

== Events ==
Moonlight Consultancy Private Limited, company based in Nepal, recruited twelve Nepalis to work in Amman, Jordan as chefs, cleaners and builders for Jordanian businesses. On 19 August 2004, they were transported to Iraq by a caravan using the Amman-Baghdad Highway. The same day, they were kidnapped by an Iraqi Sunni insurgent group, Jamaat Ansar al-Sunna. On 20 August, the group released a video of the hostages which showed them begging for their lives and blaming Pralhad Giri of Moonlight Consultants for their abduction; the media was aired by various Nepali channels. On 23 August, the Government of Nepal made a plead via the Al Jazeera television channel, however, Nepali diplomats were unable to contact the kidnappers. The Nepali government also wrote to the Iraqi government, nevertheless, on 31 August at 6 pm, television channels broadcast pictures of the dead bodies of 12 Nepalis.

In a video later posted by the militants to jihadist websites online the hostages are shown being executed, with one beheaded and the rest shot dead.

== Hostages ==
Sources:

1. Sanjay Kumar Thakur
2. Budan Kumar Shah
3. Lalan Singh Koirala
4. Manoj Kumar Thakur
5. Jhok Bahadur Thapa
6. Jit Bahadur Thapa
7. Ramesh Khadka
8. Mangal Bahadur Limbu
9. Bishnu Hari Thapa
10. Rajendra Kumar Shrestha
11. Gyanendra Shrestha
12. Prakash Adhikari

== Aftermath ==
=== Riots ===
Riots in Nepal began shortly after the hostages were killed. Thousands of people rioted in cities and towns across Nepal, which saw looting, arson, as well as imposed curfew and the deaths of two people. Several violent clashes with police followed the crisis, along with vandalism of Kantipur Publications, Kantipur Television, Space Time Network, and Channel Nepal. The Nepal Association of Foreign Employment Agencies was reported to have lost about billions of Nepali Rupees (NPR), and various companies also lost about 750 million NPR in damages.

=== Reactions ===
King Gyanendra and Queen Komal expressed their "condolences to the family and relatives of the people killed by Iraqi militants". It was reported that they were "shocked and grieved" by the cruel acts made by Jamaat Ansar al-Sunna. On 1 September, Prime Minister Sher Bahadur Deuba gave a nationwide speech on Radio Nepal and he called for "restraint". Deuba stated he would also provide 1 million Nepalese rupees to victims' family, and proclaimed 2 September to be a national day of mourning.

It was also condemned by Indian Prime Minister: Manmohan Singh, United States Secretary of State: Colin Powell, Minister of External Affairs: Natwar Singh, Jack Straw, Pope John Paul II, governments of Bangladesh and Japan. The Kathmandu Post called the militants "terrorists who have camouflaged themselves in the masks of Islam".

== In the media ==
- In 2018, Cam Simpson published the non-fiction book The Girl From Kathmandu: Twelve Dead Men and a Woman's Quest for Justice which documents this incident.
