= Bhimdatta Panta =

Nepalese revolutionary leader and martyr (1926–1953)

Bhimdatta Pant
- सहिद श्री भिमदत्त पन्त
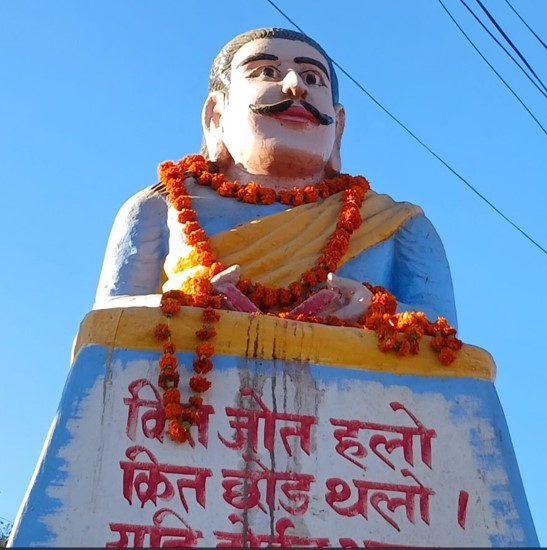
- Statue of Martyr Bhimdatta Pant at Amargadhi, Dadeldhura District

Personal details
- Born: 1926 A.D. (1983 BS Mangshir 10) Amargadhi, Dadeldhura District, Nepal
- Died: 1953 A.D. (2010 BS Vhadra 7) Jogbuda, Dadeldhura District, Nepal
- Parent: Taranath Pant (father)
- Relatives: Brother Yadunath Pant
- Occupation: Revolutionary leader, Farmer Leader

Bhimdatta Pant (Nepali: भिमदत्त पन्त) was a farmer, revolutionary leader and a martyr from Dadeldhura District of Nepal. He is known for raising a protest in favour of peasants and oppressed farmers in the Far-Western Region of Nepal by the landlord's "elite Thakuris". He was martyred with the charges of treason by local elites in 1953 A.D, aged 27. The town Bhim Datta Municipality in Kanchanpur district is named after him (until 2008 the town was named Mahendranagar). A non-profit organization was named by two farmers leaders, Dr. Dev Dhawal and Bhimdatta Pant, as Dev Dhawal and Bhim Datta Foundation for Farmers Right and Respect.

== Background ==
Born to Taranath Pant and Saraswati Devi on the 10th of Mangshir of Vikram Samvat Calendar, Bhimdatta was educated in India. He then went on to establish schools and Pathshala in Far Western Nepal.

== Political career ==
He began his political career by participating in Bharat Chhodo Aandolan as a cadre. He then returned to Nepal and joined Nepali Congress in 2006 BS. After a dispute with Congressmen, he left to Nepal Communist Party in 2009 BS.

He revolted against elites by Noon Aandolan (Salt Protest), distributing salts from Bramhadev Mandi to poor peasants. He began armed rebellions against elites with the aim to eliminate feudalism, caste-based discrimination and oppression of farmers. His quote in Nepali: कि जोत हलो, कि छोड थलो, हैन भने छैन अब भलो translates to Either plough the fields or leave it, else you may have to pay the cost. The quotation was against landlords of Far Western who oppressed the poor farmers. His army squads were eliminating corrupt government officials and tyrant feudal Thakuris and distributing the salts and foods to farmers. He rose as Robinhood of Far-Western Nepal. The attack was outmatching the Nepal Government, and a cunning strategy was webbed to bring Indian armed forces to kill Bhimdatta. Bhimdatta 's strategy was unmatched unless exposed by friends. He was killed gruesomely in Jogbudha forest and the Thakuri feudal hung his bodyless head in a market of Dadeldhura. A Nepali movie Bhimdatta was released about his story.

== See also ==
- Martyrs of Nepal
- Dashrath Chand
