= Khil Raj Regmi =

Nepalese politician (born 1949)

- खिलराज रेग्मी
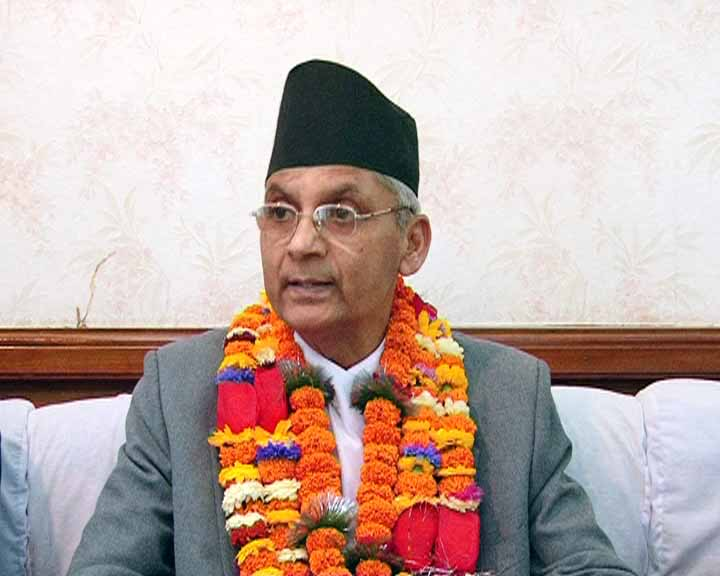
- Regmi in 2011

Interim Prime Minister of Nepal
- In office 14 March 2013 – 11 February 2014
- President: Ram Baran Yadav
- Preceded by: Baburam Bhattarai
- Succeeded by: Sushil Koirala

Chief Justice of Nepal
- In office 6 May 2011 – 11 April 2014
- Appointed by: Ram Baran Yadav
- Preceded by: Ram Prasad Shrestha
- Succeeded by: Damodar Prasad Sharma

Personal details
- Born: 31 May 1949 (age 77) Palpa, Nepal
- Spouse: Shanta Regmi
- Children: 3
- Education: Tribhuvan University

Khil Raj Regmi (Nepali: खिलराज रेग्मी, OGDB, OTSP, born 31 May 1949) was the interim Prime Minister of Nepal from 2013 to 2014. Regmi has served as Chief Justice of Nepal since May 2011, having been appointed by President Ram Baran Yadav after the expiry of the term of his predecessor, Chief Justice Ram Prasad Shrestha. In early 2013, the main political parties agreed to install Regmi as chairman of cabinet on a short-term basis, to oversee elections. He was sworn in on 14 March 2013 by President Yadav.

== See also ==
- Regmi interim cabinet, 2013

Legal offices
Preceded by Ram Prasad Shrestha	Chief Justice of Nepal; 2011–2014	Succeeded by Damodar Prasad Sharma
Political offices
Preceded by Baburam Bhattarai	Prime Minister of Nepal; 2013–2014	Succeeded by Sushil Koirala
