= Ratna Bahadur Bista =

Former Chief Justice of Nepal

Former Hon'ble Ratna Bahadur Bista
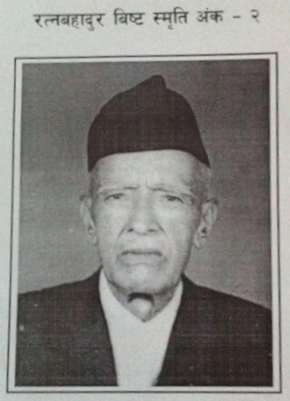

5th Chief Justice of Nepal
- In office 26 July 1970 – 6 August 1976
- Appointed by: Mahendra Bir Bikram Shah Dev
- Preceded by: Bhagwati Prashad Singh
- Succeeded by: Nayan Bahadur Khatri

Personal details
- Born: Dadeldhura
- Died: Kathmandu, Bir Hospital
- Spouse: Ganga Devi Bista
- Children: Dhirendra Bahadur Bista, Jitendra Bahadur Bista, Kishore Bista, Sarmista Devi Singh, Shanta Kathayat, Sarala Karki, Sashi Khadka, Anju Karki
- Education: L.L.B
- Alma mater: University of Allahabad
- Awards: Order of Tri Shakti Patta, Order of Gorkha Dakshina Bahu

Ratna Bahadur Bista (1910–1990) was the fifth Chief Justice of Nepal. He was born in Dadeldhura to an aristocratic family that was given land grants in Sudurpashchim Province circa 1911 during a hunting trip by King George V of the United Kingdom and Chandra Shumsher Jang Bahadur Rana, the Prime Minister of the Rana Dynasty. He went on to become the 5th Chief Justice of Nepal, in office from 26 July 1970 to 6 August 1976. He was appointed by the then-king of Nepal, Mahendra. He was responsible for the Summary Procedure Act 1971. The Committee that he established recommended for the establishment of High Courts in different regions which resulted in the creation of a four tiered judicial structure with one additional tier in the middle- "the Regional Courts."

He is the recipient of the Order of Tri Shakti Patta by King Birendra of Nepal on June 10, 1980

He had worked as a member of the National Election Commission formed by King Birendra on June 26, 1980. The Election Commission had held a referendum election in 2037 BS 1980 AD

Bista was preceded by Bhagwati Prashad Singh and succeeded by Nayan Bahadur Khatri.

== Personal life ==
He is a part of the Bista Family that originates in the far western region of Nepal. Many members and mostly his nephews have held public office in the government of Nepal.His Nephew Lok Pratap Bista was also appointed by King Mahendra of Nepal as the Minister of Forestry and Agriculture.

His nephew Puran Bahadur Bista also held public office as the 4th Nepalese Director General of Department of Customs. His nephew Dr. Mahendra Bahadur Bista held the position of director general of the government's Department of Health (DOH) and the director of Nepal's Epidemiological and Disease Control Division position implementing modern maternity care and disease control in rural parts of the country. His eldest son Dhirendra Bahadur Bista was a judge in the district court while his second son Major Jitendra Bahadur Bista was a military pilot and major in the Nepal Army, known for his daredevil helicopter stunts and rescue missions all over Nepal. His nephew Dipendra Bahadur Bista was the ambassador of Nepal to the United Kingdom from 2003 to 2007. Another nephew of the same namesake was Deputy Inspector General Dipendra Bahadur Bista who was the head of Mid Western Regional Police Office in Surkhet, Nepal.
