= Nayan Bahadur Khatri =

Former Chief Justice of Nepal

Former Hon'ble Nayan Bahadur Khatri

6th in Chief Justice of Nepal
- In office 8 December 1976 – 10 December 1985
- Appointed by: Birendra Bir Bikram Shah Dev
- Preceded by: Ratna Bahadur Bista
- Succeeded by: Dhanendra Bahadur Singh

Personal details
- Died: 24 May 2019 (aged 99) Bhainsepati, Lalitpur

Nayan Bahadur Khatri (died 24 May 2019) was a Nepalese judge who served as 6th Chief Justice of Nepal, in office from 8 December 1976 to 10 December 1985. He was appointed by the then-king of Nepal, Birendra. He was the longest serving Chief Justice of Nepal.

Khatri was preceded by Ratna Bahadur Bista and succeeded by Dhanendra Bahadur Singh. He also served as an ambassador to China from 1986 to 1990.

He died on May 24, 2019, at the age of 99.
