= Chairperson of the National Assembly (Nepal) =

Presiding member of the upper house of the Parliament of Nepal

- राष्ट्रिय सभाका अध्यक्ष
- Emblem of Nepal

- Flag of Nepal
- Incumbent; Narayan Prasad Dahal since 12 March 2024
- House of Representatives
- Style: The Right Honourable
- Status: Deputy presiding officer
- Member of: Constitutional Council
- Seat: Federal Parliament Building, Singha Durbar, Kathmandu
- Nominator: Parliamentary party
- Appointer: Elected by National Assembly
- Term length: At the House's pleasure; elected at the beginning of the new National Assembly by a majority of the representatives, and upon a vacancy.
- Constituting instrument: Article 92 of the Constitution of Nepal
- Formation: 1959; 67 years ago
- First holder: Dambar Bahadur Singh (1959)
- Deputy: Deputy Chairperson of the National Assembly
- Salary: रू
- Website: na.parliament.gov.np

The chairperson of the National Assembly in Nepal is the presiding officer of the upper house of the Federal Parliament of Nepal, the National Assembly. The position of Chairperson holds significant importance in the legislative process, presiding over the proceedings, maintaining order, and ensuring fair debate and discussion. The current chairperson is Narayan Prasad Dahal since 12 March 2024.

== Qualification ==
The qualifications for being a member of National Assembly are laid out in Article 87 of the constitution and the National Assembly (Rastriya Sabha) Member Election Act, 2017:

- must be a citizen of Nepal
- must be at least thirty-five years of age on date of nomination
- must have name listed on voter list
- should not have been convicted of a criminal offense involving moral turpitude
- must not be disqualified by any Federal law
- must not be holding any office of profit.

== List of Chairpersons ==
Chairpersons of the National Assembly
Name	Party	Took office	Left office
Dambar Bahadur Singh	Nominated by King Mahendra	20 July 1959	15 December 1960
Parliament of the Kingdom of Nepal
Beni Bahadur Karki	Nepali Congress	30 June 1991	13 July 1999
Mohammad Mohsin	Rastriya Prajatantra Party	12 August 1999	26 June 2002
Federal Parliament of Nepal
Ganesh Prasad Timilsina	CPN (UML)	15 March 2018	12 March 2024
Narayan Prasad Dahal	CPN (Maoist Centre)	12 March 2024	Incumbent
