= Gyanendra Khadka =

Nepali journalist (died 2003)

- ज्ञानेन्द्र खँड्का
- Born: Sindhupalchok, Nepal
- Occupations: Journalist, author
- Spouse: Mithila Khadka
- Children: Aswin Khadka and Asmita Khadka

Gyanendra Khadka (Nepali: ज्ञानेन्द्र खँड्का) (died 2003) was a journalist of Nepal who was killed by Maoist insurgents during the Maoist insurgency in Nepal. He was brutally murdered by a group of Maoist rebels on 7 September 2003, in Jyamire village of Sindhupalchok District, Nepal. At age of 35, Khadka was working as a reporter with the state-owned news agency Rastriya Samachar Samiti (RSS),. Khadka was abducted from a school in the village by four gunmen and they tied his hands with a rope. When his wife searched for and discovered him, he was tied to a volleyball pole in the middle of the village. The rebels then slit his throat with a Khukuri (a knife) in front of his wife.

Khadka had served many years as correspondent of Samacharpatra, published from Melamchi valley. At the time of killing, he was serving to National News Agency as an stringer and simultaneously serving in a local school as a teacher. The abduction held right after he had addressed at a gathering of teachers and guardians of a high school in Jyamire village of Sindhupalchok District.

Many press freedom organisations condemned the violence.

== See also ==
- List of kidnappings
