= Bishwonath Upadhyaya =

Nepalese judge

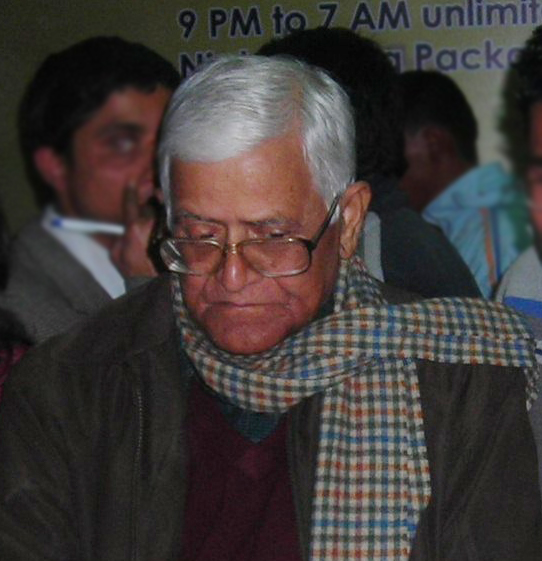
- Bishwanath Upadhyay during CAN Infotech 2006 at Kathmandu.

Chief Justice of Nepal
- In office 8 December 1991 – 22 September 1995
- Preceded by: Dhanendra Bahadur Singh
- Succeeded by: Surendra Prasad Singh

Personal details
- Born: 13 October 1930 Malangawa, Nepal
- Died: 30 January 2014 (aged 83) Bansbari, Nepal
- Children: 4

Bishwonath Upadhyaya (Nepali: विश्वनाथ उपाध्याय) (13 October 1930 – 30 January 2014) was the 8th Chief Justice of Nepal from 1991 to 1995. He had previously served as chairman of the 1990 constitution drafting committee.

== Early life ==
He was born in 1930 in Malangwa Sarlahi. He is survived by four sons, He was living with his eldest son in Kathmandu, His three other sons live in the US. He started his career in government service as legal officer in Nepal Rastra Bank in 1955 and later entered the Ministry of Law.

== Famous For ==
The apex court bench led by him reinstated the parliament dissolved by then Prime Minister Man Mohan Adhikari on 28 August 1995. The bench had a bench of 11 members which made its decision by a vote of eight to three. The parliament was dissolved by the King Birendra at the recommendation of then prime minister Man Mohan Adhikari as a pre-emptive move to avert a no-confidence motion tabled by the opposition. Lawmakers from the communist party have been trying to file impeachment motions in the parliament against him.

The Supreme Court has still been following the precedent set by him. He has defined the issues of constitution and human rights.

He headed the constitution drafting committee of 1990, is also credited for his role in evolving Nepal's judiciary as separate institution.

Legal offices
Preceded by Dhanendra Bahadur Singh	Chief Justice of Nepal; 1991 – 1995	Succeeded by Surendra Prasad Singh
