= Manoj Kumar Sharma (Justice) =

Chief Justice of Nepal

The Rt Hon. Manoj Kumar Sharma
- मनोजकुमार शर्मा
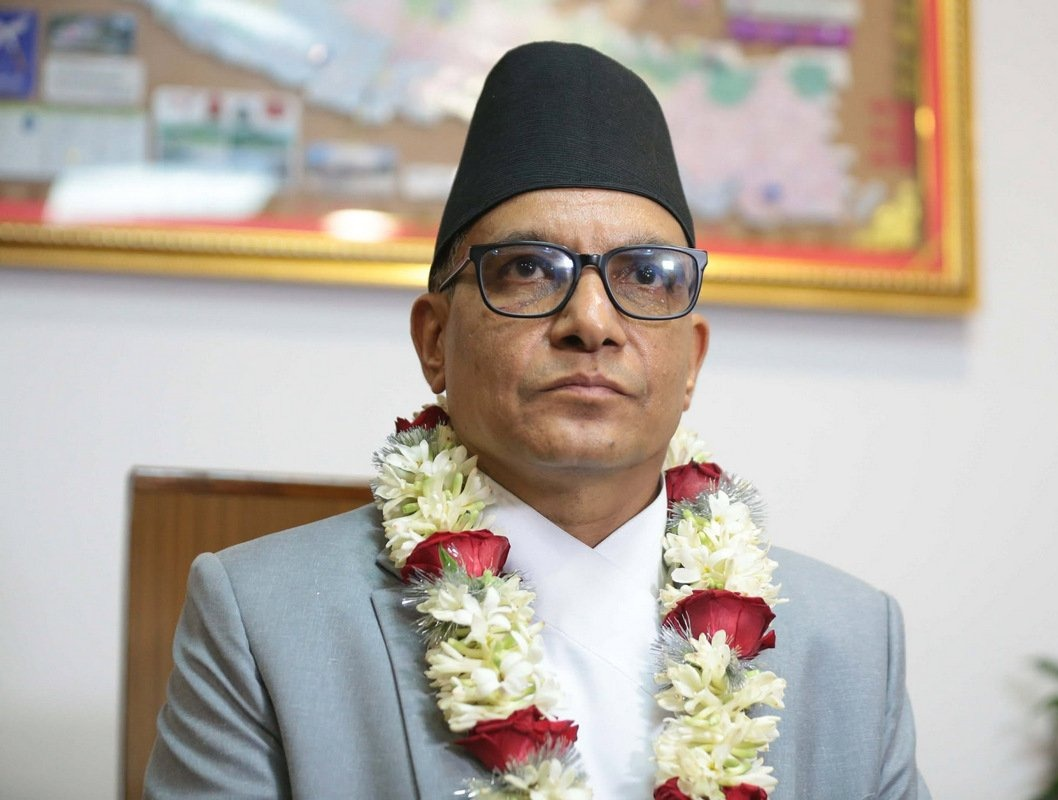
- Sharma in 2026

Chief Justice of Nepal
- Incumbent
- Assumed office 19 May 2026
- President: Ram Chandra Paudel
- Vice President: Ram Sahaya Yadav
- Preceded by: Sapana Pradhan Malla (acting)

Justice of Supreme Court of Nepal
- Incumbent
- Assumed office 19 April 2019

Personal details
- Born: 18 June 1970 (age 56) Birgunj, Parsa District
- Education: Nepal Law Campus (LLB); University of Pune (LLM); Tribhuvan University (PhD)

Dr. Manoj Kumar Sharma (Note: Nepali: डा. मनोजकुमार शर्मा) (born 18 June 1970) is a Nepalese jurist who has served as the 33rd Chief Justice of Nepal since 19 May 2026. He had previously served as a Justice of the Supreme Court from April 2019 until his accession as Chief Justice.

== Early life and education ==
Sharma was born in Birgunj. He received a Bachelor of Law degree from Nepal Law Campus and an LLM degree from University of Pune. He obtained a doctorate in Labor Law from Tribhuvan University.

== Career ==
Sharma became an advocate in 1995. He was appointed judge of the Supreme Court on 19 April 2019. He has previously served as an additional Judge of the Appellate Court in Butwal and Patan from 10 June 2013 to 12 December 2015.

In one of the first major decision by the government of Balen Shah, Sharma was recommended by the Constitutional Council, ahead of three other senior judges of the Supreme Court, to become the next chief justice, citing his better frequency is resolution of lawsuits and in a break from tradition of appointing the senior-most judge as Chief Justice.

On 19 May 2026, following fast-tracked hearings, the parliamentary committee endorsed his appointment, and he was sworn in as the 33rd Chief Justice later the same day
