= Om Prakash Mishra (judge) =

Nepali jurist

The Rt Hon Mr. Om Prakash Mishra

Chief Justice of Nepal
- In office 10 September 2018 – 1 January 2019
- Preceded by: Deepak Raj Joshee
- Succeeded by: Cholendra Shumsher JBR

Justice of the Supreme Court of Nepal
- In office 27 May 2014 – 5 August 2018

Personal details
- Born: January 1, 1954 (age 72) Rupandehi, Lumbini Province, Nepal
- Spouse: Lalita Mishra
- Education: University of Delhi
- Occupation: Judge

Om Prakash Mishra (Nepali: ओमप्रकाश मिश्र) is a Nepali Jurist who was the 26th Chief Justice of the Supreme Court of Nepal. He was appointed to the highest position in the apex court on 3 August 2018.

== Education ==
Degree	University/Board	Year
Master of Comparative Law (MCL)	Delhi University, India	1989
Master in Arts (Political Science)	Tribhuvan University, Nepal	1985
Diploma in Law (D.L.)	Tribhuvan University, Nepal	1980

Mishra completed his Masters of Comparative Law (MCL) from Delhi University in 1989. He also studied Political Science from Tribhuvan University, completing in 1985.

He speaks Bhojpuri (native), Nepali (spoken and written), English (spoken and written) and Hindi (spoken and written)

== Career ==
Designation	Organization/Institution	Tenure Period
Chief Justice	Supreme Court of Nepal	September 10, 2018 – January 1, 2019
Acting Chief Justice	Supreme Court of Nepal	August 5, 2018 – September 10, 2018
Justice	Supreme Court of Nepal	May 27, 2014 – August 5, 2018
Chief Judge	Appellate Court Rajbiraj	2013- May 25, 2014 A.D.
Member	Special Court	2008-Jan. 9, 2013 A.D.
Judge	Various Appellate Court	2006-Feb 26, 2009 A.D.
Judge	Various District Courts	1990-March 22, 2006 A.D.
Additional District Judge	Mid Western Regional Court Surkhet	1985 - April 28, 1990 A.D.
Section Officer	Ministry of Law and Justice	1981-Oct. 26, 1985 A.D.

== Participation in different law related events ==
- Judicial institution of Australia
- 3rd South Asia Chief Justices Roundtable on Environmental Justice Sri Lanka
- Enforceable World Law - India
- Commercial Court of Australia
- Court and Case Management System of Philippines

== See also ==
- Cholendra Shumsher JBR
- Deepak Raj Joshee
- Gopal Prasad Parajuli
