= Kalyan Shrestha =

Former Chief Justice of the Supreme Court of Nepal

Chief Justice of Nepal
- In office 8 July 2015 – 12 April 2016
- Appointed by: The Constitutional Council of Nepal
- Preceded by: Ram Kumar Prasad Shah
- Succeeded by: Sushila Karki

Personal details
- Born: 14 April 1951 (age 75) Baglung, Nepal

Kalyan Shrestha (Nepali: कल्याण श्रेष्ठ; born 14 April 1951) is the former Chief Justice of the Supreme Court of Nepal.
