= Ram Prasad Shrestha =

Former chief justice of Nepal

Ram Prasad Shrestha was the Chief Justice of Nepal from 26 March 2010 to 5 May 2011.
