= Dilip Kumar Poudel =

Nepalese judge

Dilip Kumar Paudel was the 17th Chief Justice of Nepal from 31 July 2005 to 8 September 2007.
