= Govinda Bahadur Shrestha =

Nepalese judge

Govinda Bahadur Shrestha (1939 – November 12, 2016) was the 15th Chief Justice of Nepal from 22 January 2004 to 13 January 2005.
