= Chief Justice of Nepal =

Presiding justice of the Supreme Court of Nepal

- नेपालका प्रधानन्यायाधीश
- Emblem of Nepal

- Flag of Nepal

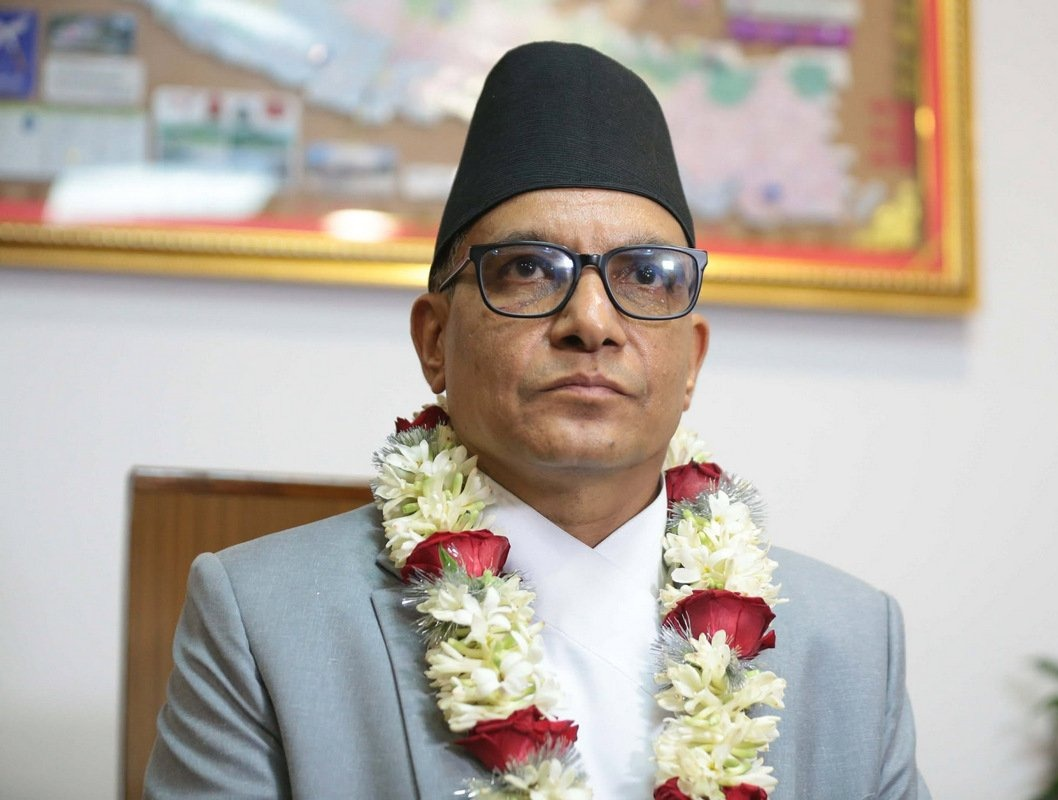
- Incumbent; Manoj Kumar Sharma since 19 May 2026
- Style: The Right Honourable (formal); Honourable Judge (within court)
- Member of: Constitutional Council, Judicial Council
- Appointer: Presidential nomination with confirmation from parliament
- Term length: 6 years
- Inaugural holder: Hari Prasad Pradhan
- Formation: 10 August 1951
- Salary: रु 88,950
- Website: Supreme Court of Nepal

The Chief Justice of Nepal (Nepali: नेपालका प्रधानन्यायाधीश) is the head of the judicial branch of Nepal and the chief judge of the Supreme Court of Nepal. The chief justice is the highest judicial officer in the country, and acts as a chief administrative officer for all the judicial system. It is the fourth highest rank on the Order of precedence in Nepal.

The current Chief Justice is Manoj Kumar Sharma since 19 May 2026.

== List of chief justices ==
No.	Name	Term start	Term end	Appointed by
1	Hari Prasad Pradhan	10 August 1951	20 May 1956	King Tribhuvan
2	Anirudra Prasad Singh	21 May 1956	29 June 1959	King Mahendra
(1)	Hari Prasad Pradhan	14 December 1961	15 December 1963	King Mahendra
3	Bhagwati Prashad Singh	9 April 1964	10 July 1970	King Mahendra
4	Ratna Bahadur Bista	26 July 1970	6 August 1976	King Mahendra
5	Nayan Bahadur Khatri	8 December 1976	10 December 1985	King Birendra
6	Dhanendra Bahadur Singh	11 December 1985	7 August 1991	King Birendra
7	Bishwonath Upadhyaya	8 August 1991	25 September 1995	King Birendra
8	Surendra Prasad Singh	26 September 1995	14 February 1997	King Birendra
9	Trilok Pratap Rana	15 February 1997	16 September 1997	King Birendra
10	Om Bhakta Shrestha	22 September 1997	12 April 1998	King Birendra
11	Mohan Prasad Sharma	13 April 1998	15 December 1999	King Birendra
12	Keshav Prasad Upadhyaya	16 December 1999	5 December 2002	King Birendra
13	Kedar Nath Upadhyay	6 December 2002	21 January 2004	King Gyanendra
14	Govinda Bahadur Shrestha	22 January 2004	13 January 2005	King Gyanendra
15	Hari Prasad Sharma	14 January 2005	29 July 2005	King Gyanendra
16	Dilip Kumar Poudel	31 July 2005	8 September 2007	King Gyanendra
17	Kedar Prasad Giri	5 October 2007	7 May 2009	Girija Prasad Koirala
18	Min Bahadur Rayamajhi	8 May 2009	10 February 2010	Ram Baran Yadav
19	Anup Raj Sharma	11 February 2010	25 March 2010	Ram Baran Yadav
20	Ram Prasad Shrestha	26 March 2010	5 May 2011	Ram Baran Yadav
21	Khil Raj Regmi	6 May 2011	11 February 2014	Ram Baran Yadav
22	Damodar Prasad Sharma	11 April 2014	9 October 2014	Ram Baran Yadav
23	Ram Kumar Shah	10 October 2014	7 July 2015	Ram Baran Yadav
24	Kalyan Shrestha	8 July 2015	12 April 2016	Ram Baran Yadav
25	Sushila Karki	11 July 2016	9 June 2017	Bidya Devi Bhandari
26	Gopal Prasad Parajuli	9 June 2017	14 March 2018	Bidya Devi Bhandari
27	Om Prakash Mishra	5 August 2018	1 January 2019	Bidya Devi Bhandari
28	Cholendra Shumser JBR	2 January 2019	13 December 2022	Bidya Devi Bhandari
29	Hari Krishna Karki	16 June 2023	4 August 2023	Ram Chandra Paudel
30	Bishwambhar Prasad Shrestha	22 August 2023	4 October 2024	Ram Chandra Paudel
31	Prakash Man Singh Raut	7 October 2024	31 March 2026	Ram Chandra Paudel
32	Manoj Kumar Sharma	19 May 2026	Incumbent	Ram Chandra Paudel

== See also ==
- Supreme Court of Nepal
