= Prime Minister of Nepal =

Head of government

Prime Minister of the Federal Democratic Republic of Nepal
- संघीय लोकतान्त्रिक गणतन्त्र नेपालका प्रधानमन्त्री Sanghīya lōkatāntrika gaṇatantra nēpālakā pradhānamantrī (ISO)
- Emblem of Nepal

- Flag of Nepal
- Incumbent; Balendra Shah since 27 March 2026
- Prime Minister's Office; Council of Ministers of Nepal; Executive branch of the Central Government
- Style: The Right Honourable (formal); Mr. Prime Minister (informal); His Excellency (diplomatic)
- Status: Head of government
- Abbreviation: PM
- Member of: Constitutional Council; Council of Ministers; Federal Parliament of Nepal; National Planning Commission; National Security Council
- Reports to: The President; Parliament of Nepal
- Residence: Baluwatar
- Seat: Singha Durbar
- Nominator: MPs of the House of Representatives
- Appointer: President of Nepal; By constitutional convention, based on appointee's ability to command confidence in the House of Representatives
- Term length: No fixed term; serves while maintaining the confidence of the House of Representatives; 5 years term unless dissolved sooner; No term limits specified
- Constituting instrument: Article 76 (1), Constitution of Nepal
- Formation: 1845; 181 years ago
- First holder: Mathabarsingh Thapa
- Deputy: Deputy Prime Minister of Nepal
- Salary: NPR 77,280 (per month); NPR 927,360 (annual)
- Website: https://opmcm.gov.np/

The Prime Minister of Nepal (Nepali: नेपालको प्रधानमन्त्री, romanized: Nēpālakō pradhānamantrī) is the head of government of Federal Democratic Republic of Nepal. The prime minister leads the Council of Ministers and holds the chief executive authority in the country. The prime minister must command majority support and maintain the confidence of the House of Representatives to remain in office. If the prime minister loses this support, they are required to resign.

The official residence of the prime minister is located in Baluwatar, Kathmandu. The seat of the prime minister's office has been at Singha Durbar since Chandra Shumsher Jung Bahadur Rana's reign (1901–1929).

The sitting prime minister ranks third in the order of precedence in Nepal.

Balendra Shah has been serving as the prime minister of Nepal since 27 March 2026 and is currently the world's youngest serving state leader.

== History ==
The position of Prime Minister of Nepal has evolved significantly over centuries, reflecting the country's complex political and social transformations. Initially, the role was largely ceremonial under the rule of monarchs, with real power concentrated in the hands of kings and hereditary chiefs.

The establishment of the Shah monarchy in the 18th century brought the office of Prime Minister into greater prominence. The title was often held by powerful nobles and royal courtiers who effectively controlled the administration and military affairs. The office of Prime Minister was officially established in 1845, with some modifications, following the abolition of the office of Mukhtiyar, a position equivalent to that of a prime minister. During the Rana regime (1846–1951), the Prime Ministership became hereditary within the Rana family, marking an era of autocratic rule where the Prime Minister wielded supreme power, while the king remained a figurehead.

The end of the Rana regime in 18 February 1951 ushered in a new era of parliamentary democracy. Since then, the office of Prime Minister has been central to Nepal’s political landscape, navigating through various phases including constitutional monarchies, multiparty democracy, periods of political instability, and the eventual abolition of the monarchy in 2008.

Following the declaration of Nepal as a federal democratic republic, the Prime Minister now serves as the head of government, responsible for executive functions and policy-making, working alongside the President, who acts as the ceremonial head of state.

== Powers and authority ==
The prime minister has a more enhanced constitutional role than their counterparts in other parliamentary democracies. This is because Section 75 of the Constitution explicitly vests the executive power of the federal government in the Council of Ministers–of which the prime minister is the leader–not the president. In most other parliamentary republics, the president is at least the nominal chief executive, while being bound by convention to act on the advice of the cabinet. Per Section 76, the prime minister is the chairman of the Council of Ministers and thus exercises executive power collectively with the Council of Ministers.

== Constitutional background ==
Under part 7, Article 76, of the Constitution, the president is required to appoint the leader of the majority party in the House of Representatives as prime minister. If no party has a majority, the president is required to appoint an MP who has the support of a coalition of parties who between them have a majority in the chamber–in practice, the leader of the senior partner in such a coalition. If no majority coalition can be formed within 30 days of the final result of a parliamentary election, the president is required to appoint the leader of the largest party in the chamber. In the latter cases, the person appointed as prime minister must win a confidence vote within 30 days. However, if a confidence vote is unsuccessful, the president must appoint an MP who can demonstrate command the confidence of the House. In the event that no member can command the confidence of the House within 55 days of the announcement of the final results of the election, new elections must be held within six months.

== Vacation of office ==
The vacation process of the prime minister as per Section 77 (1) of 2015 Constitution of Nepal is as follows:

The prime minister shall cease to hold office in the following circumstances:

1. If they tender written resignation to the president,
2. If a vote of confidence fails to be approved according to Article (100), or a motion of no confidence is passed,
3. If they cease to be a member of the House of Representatives,
4. If they pass away.

Furthermore, the Section 77 (3) states: If the prime minister ceases to hold the office according to clause (1), the same council of ministers shall continue to work until another council of ministers is constituted, provided that, in the case of the death of the prime minister, the senior most minister shall continue to act as prime minister until a new prime minister is appointed.

== See also ==
- Balendra Shah cabinet
- List of prime ministers of Nepal
