= Deepak Raj Joshi =

Former Judge of Supreme Court of Nepal

The Rt Hon. Deepak Raj Joshi
- दिपकराज जोशी

Acting Chief Justice of the Supreme Court of Nepal
- In office 19 March 2018 – 5 August 2018
- Preceded by: Gopal Prasad Parajuli
- Succeeded by: Om Prakash Mishra

Supreme Court of Nepal

Personal details
- Born: October 10, 1954 (age 72) Dhumbarahi, Kathmandu, Nepal
- Spouse: Bijaya Joshi
- Children: 2

Deepak Raj Joshi (Nepali: दिपकराज जोशी) was a Justice of the Supreme Court of Nepal. He was appointed as Acting Chief Justice of Supreme Court of Nepal on 19 March 2018. He had been recommended as the Chief Justice of Supreme Court of Nepal on 12 June 2018. He was rejected for Chief Justice of Supreme Court by the Parliamentary Hearing Special Committee on 3 August 2018.

== See also ==
- Om Prakash Mishra
- Gopal Prasad Parajuli
- Sushila Karki
