= Gopal Prasad Parajuli =

27th Chief Justice of Nepal

The Rt Hon. Gopal Parajuli

27th Chief Justice of Nepal

Personal details
- Born: 28 April 1953 (age 73) Tanahun, Nepal
- Occupation: Former Chief Justice

Gopal Prasad Parajuli (born 28 April 1953) was the former and 27th chief Justice of Nepal. He was born in Tanahun, Nepal. Inconsistencies in his birth date due to multiple records showing multiple dates led to his removal on 14 March 2018 by the Judicial Council citing he should have retired on 5 August 2017. Even after his dismissal, he resigned from his post to the President on 15 March 2018.

== Career ==
He was born on Tanahun, Nepal.

== Date of birth controversy ==
Four different date of births have surfaced and he reversed the decision made by previous Chief Justice Sushila Karki to extend his tenure as Chief Justice

== Professional career ==
S. No.	Designation	Organization/Institution	Tenure/Period
1	Chief Justice	Supreme Court of Nepal	17 July 2017 – 14 March 2018
2	Acting Chief Justice	Supreme Court of Nepal	7 June 2017 – 16 July 2017
3	Justice	Supreme Court of Nepal	May 2014 – 6 June 2017
4	Chief Judge	Various appellate courts	December 2010 – April 2014
5	Judge	Various appellate courts	October 1991 – November 2010
6	Law Practitioner (Advocate)	Supreme Court Bar Association and District Court Bar Association Nawalparasi	September 1979 – October 1991
