= 1999 in Nepal =

- Decades: 1970s; 1980s; 1990s; 2000s; 2010s
- See also: Other events of 1999; Timeline of Nepalese history

Events from the year 1999 in Nepal.

== Incumbents ==
- Monarch: Birendra
- Prime Minister: Girija Prasad Koirala (1998 – May 1999) and Krishna Prasad Bhattarai
- Chief Justice: Mohan Prasad Sharma (1998–1999) and Keshav Prasad Upadhyaya (from December 1999)

== Events ==
- May – General elections were held from 3 to 17 May.
- 5 September – Necon Air Flight 128 crashes in the west of Kathmandu.
- September and October − 8th South Asian Games were held in Kathmandu from 25 September to 4 October.
- November – ANFA League Cup is held from 20 to 30 November.
- December – Indian Airlines Flight 814 is hijacked in Indian airspace between Kathmandu, Nepal, and Delhi, India.

== Births ==
- 27 February – Lalit Rajbanshi, cricketer
- 20 May – Kajal Shrestha, cricketer
- 7 July – Apsari Begam, cricketer
- 3 September – Malati Rishidev, shortest woman in Nepal.
- 27 November – Pratima Sherpa, golfer
- 5 December – Curtis Waters, Nepali Canadian musician

== Deaths ==
- 26 April – Man Mohan Adhikari, former Prime Minister
- 4 May – Mahendra Narayan Nidhi, politician
- 22 July – Arun Thapa, singer
