= 1997 in Nepal =

- Decades: 1970s; 1980s; 1990s; 2000s; 2010s
- See also: Other events of 1997; Timeline of Nepalese history

Events from the year 1997 in Nepal.

== Incumbents ==
- Monarch: Birendra
- Prime Minister: Sher Bahadur Deuba (1995–12 March 1997); Lokendra Bahadur Chand (12 March–7 October 1997); Surya Bahadur Thapa (7 October 1997–15 April 1998)
- Chief Justice: Surendra Prasad Singh, Trilok Pratap Rana, Om Bhakta Shrestha

== Events ==
- June – Inder Kumar Gujral, Prime Minister of India visits Nepal.

== Births ==
- 22 January - Kushal Bhurtel
- 5 October – Aarif Sheikh

== Deaths ==
- 11 September – Matrika Prasad Koirala
- 18 September – Ganesh Man Singh
