= 2000 in Nepal =

- Decades: 1980s; 1990s; 2000s; 2010s; 2020s
- See also: Other events of 2000; Timeline of Nepalese history

Events from the year 2000 in Nepal.

== Incumbents ==
- Monarch: Birendra
- Prime Minister: Girija Prasad Koirala (from March 2000) and Krishna Prasad Bhattarai (1999 — March 2000)
- Chief Justice: Keshav Prasad Upadhyaya

== Events ==
- Usha Khadgi is crowned Miss Nepal.
- 26 May – National Human Rights Commission is established.
- 27 July – Nepal Airlines de Havilland Canada DHC-6 Twin Otter crashes in Dadeldhura District killing 25 people.

== Births ==
- 17 June – Supriya Maskey, Nepalese beauty queen
- 2 August – Sandeep Lamichhane, cricketer
- 12 December – Princess Purnika, Princess

== Deaths ==
- 28 March – Gaje Ghale, Gurkha recipient of the Victoria Cross.
- 27 May – Agansing Rai, Gurkha recipient of the Victoria Cross.
- August 6 – Praveen Gurung, singer
