= 1998 in Nepal =

- Decades: 1970s; 1980s; 1990s; 2000s; 2010s
- See also: Other events of 1998; Timeline of Nepalese history

Events from the year 1998 in Nepal.

== Incumbents ==
- Monarch: Birendra
- Prime Minister: Surya Bahadur Thapa, and Girija Prasad Koirala
- Chief Justice: Om Bhakta Shrestha, and Mohan Prasad Sharma

== Events ==
- 1 January – Visit Nepal Year 1998 begins.
- April – First case of Kali River goonch attacks is reported.
- 29 June – Nepalese politician Mirza Dilshad Beg is assassinated.
- 3–13 October – 1998 ACC Trophy is held in Nepal.
- 6–20 December – Nepal won four total medals – one silver and three bronzes at the 1998 Asian Games.
- 31 December – Visit Nepal Year 1998 ends.

== Births ==
- 1 January – Sunil Bal, footballer
- 26 January – Bimal Gharti Magar, footballer
- 2 March – Ishan Pandey, cricketer
- 15 May – Anjan Bista, footballer
- 31 August – Aashirman DS Joshi, actor
- 17 November – Anil Sah, cricketer
