= Nandan Jha =

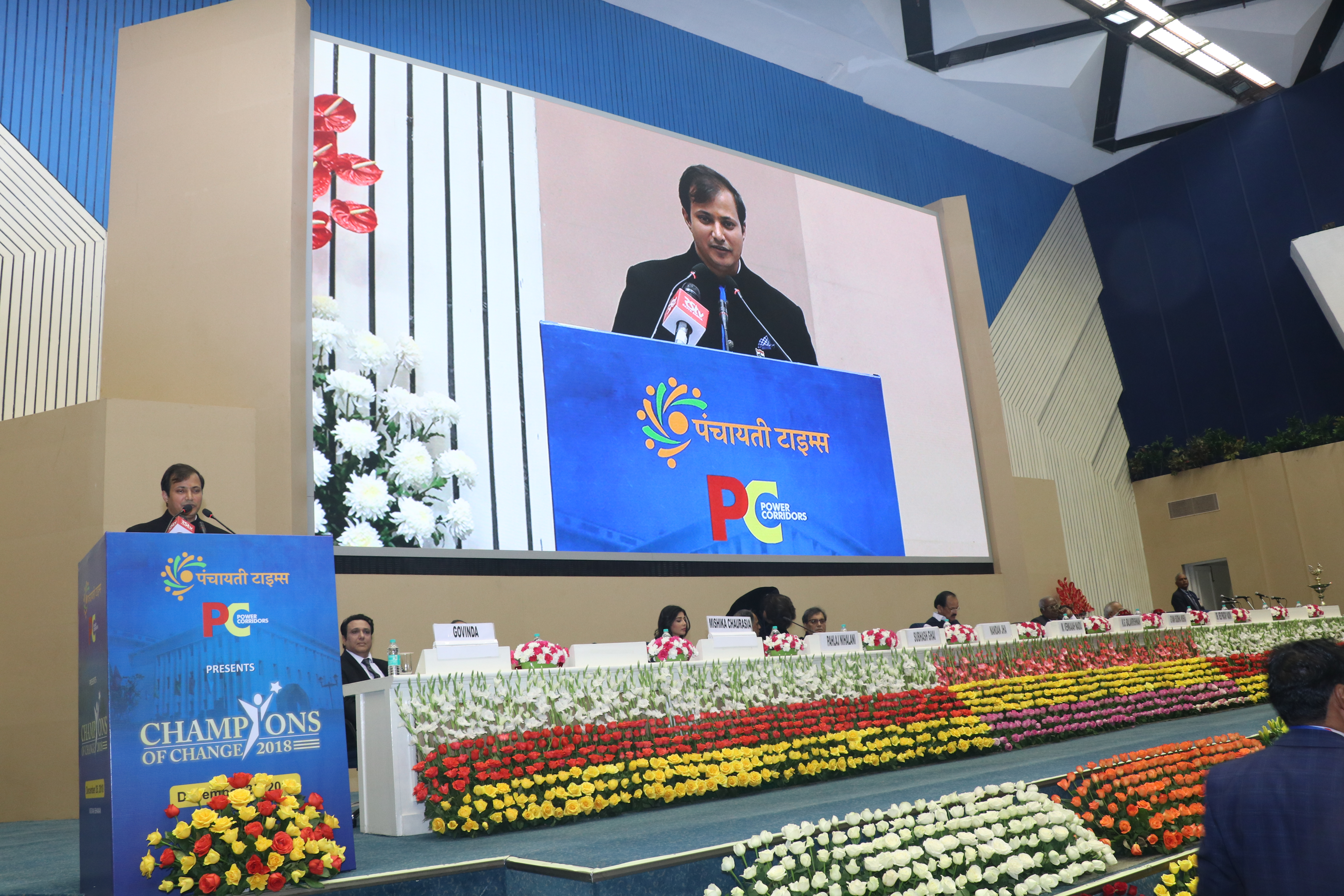
- Jha in 2018 at Vigyan Bhawan, New Delhi
- Born: 15 March 1981 (age 45); Jamshedpur
- Other names: Nandan Kumar Jha
- Known for: Journalism
- Notable work: National Bravery Award and Jeevan Raksha Padak Winner, Founder of Champions of change Award, Founder of Power Corridors & Panchayati Times, Founder of Gandhi Mandela Awards
- Spouse: Dr Payal Gawande
- Website: nandanjha.in

Nandan Jha (born 1981) is an Indian businessman. He is the chairman of Interactive Forum on Indian Economy, and the founder & Secretary General of Gandhi Mandela Foundation & initiated Gandhi Mandela Awards.Jha is also the founder of the Champions of Change (award).

Jha is also the founder and CEO of “Power Corridors” a monthly news magazine and Panchayati Times, a Digital news portal carrying rural India’s voice and followed by Hon’ble Prime Minister of India and several Union Ministers of India.

At the age of 17, Jha, with his courage and bravery, saved lives of a family and is a National Bravery Award and Jeevan Raksha Padak winner for the same. Achieving the idol for bravery was not a stop for him, he continued to serve the society with his organizations and initiated national awards for recognizing the efforts of those who work for social development & welfare.

== Career ==
Jha was associated with EaseMyTrip as the Chief Operating Officer and before that he worked as a Chief Operating Officer in News World India. He initially was associated with Sahara India as a Consultant of Corporate Communications for more than a decade.

== Awards ==
Nandan Jha is National Bravery Award and Jeevan Raksha Padak awards winner for his courage and promptitude in saving life under circumstances.

- National Bravery Award in 1997 by Prime Minister of India Inder Kumar Gujral
- Jeevan Raksha Padak Award in 1998 by President of India K. R. Narayanan
