= 2002 in Nepal =

- Decades: 1980s; 1990s; 2000s; 2010s; 2020s
- See also: Other events of 2002; Timeline of Nepalese history

Events from the year 2002 in Nepal.

== Incumbents ==
- Monarch: Gyanendra
- Prime Minister: Sher Bahadur Deuba (until 4 October), Lokendra Bahadur Chand (starting 11 October)
- Chief Justice: Keshav Prasad Upadhyaya (until 5 December), Kedar Nath Upadhyaya (starting 5 December)

== Events ==
- January 18 - US Secretary of State Colin Powell arrives in Nepal supporting the government efforts against fighting Maoist terrorist.
- February 15 - Members of the breakaway faction of CPN-UML rejoins the party, while some under the leadership of CP Mainali forms Communist Party of Nepal (Marxist–Leninist) declining to rejoin.
- February 27 - Maoists launch simultaneous attacks in Mangalsen and Sanfebagar of Accham District killing 141 including the Chief District Officer.
- May 22 - King Gyanendra dissolves parliament on recommendation of Prime Minister Sher Bahadur Deuba and calls for election on November 13.
- May 27
  - State of emergency is extended for three months through royal ordinance.
  - Maoists attack a Royal Nepal Army base in Khara, Rukum. A dozen soldiers are killed whereas over 100 maoists are killed in the attack.
- October 3 - Deuba proposes to delay election for a year.
- October 4 - King Gyanendra dismisses Prime Minister Sher Bahadur Deuba terming him incapable.
- November 14 - Maoists attack Khalanga, the district headquarter of Jumla.

== Births ==
- July 10 – Prince Hridayendra of Nepal

== Deaths ==
- October 15 - Lain Singh Bangdel, artist and novelist
