= 2001 in Nepal =

- Decades: 1980s; 1990s; 2000s; 2010s; 2020s
- See also: Other events of 2001; Timeline of Nepalese history

Events from the year 2001 in Nepal.

== Incumbents ==
- Monarch:
  - Birendra (until June 1),
  - Dipendra (from June 1 to June 4),
  - Gyanendra (from June 4)
- Prime Minister: Girija Prasad Koirala (until 26 July), Sher Bahadur Deuba (from 26 July)
- Chief Justice: Keshav Prasad Upadhyaya

== Events ==
- January - 10th General Convention of Nepali Congress.
- June 1 - Nepalese royal massacre.
- June 4 - Prince Gyanendra is crowned King.
- November 23 - Maoists attack a Royal Nepal Army base for the first time in Ghorahi, Dang.
- November 26 - The government declares a national state of emergency.

== Deaths ==
- February 5 - Daya Bir Singh Kansakar, social worker
- April 29 - Babu Chiri Sherpa, mountaineer
- June 1 - King Birendra
- June 1 - Queen Aishwarya
- June 1 - Princess Shruti
- June 1 - Prince Nirajan
- June 4 - King Dipendra
- November 12 - Princess Prekshya
