= Panchayati Times =

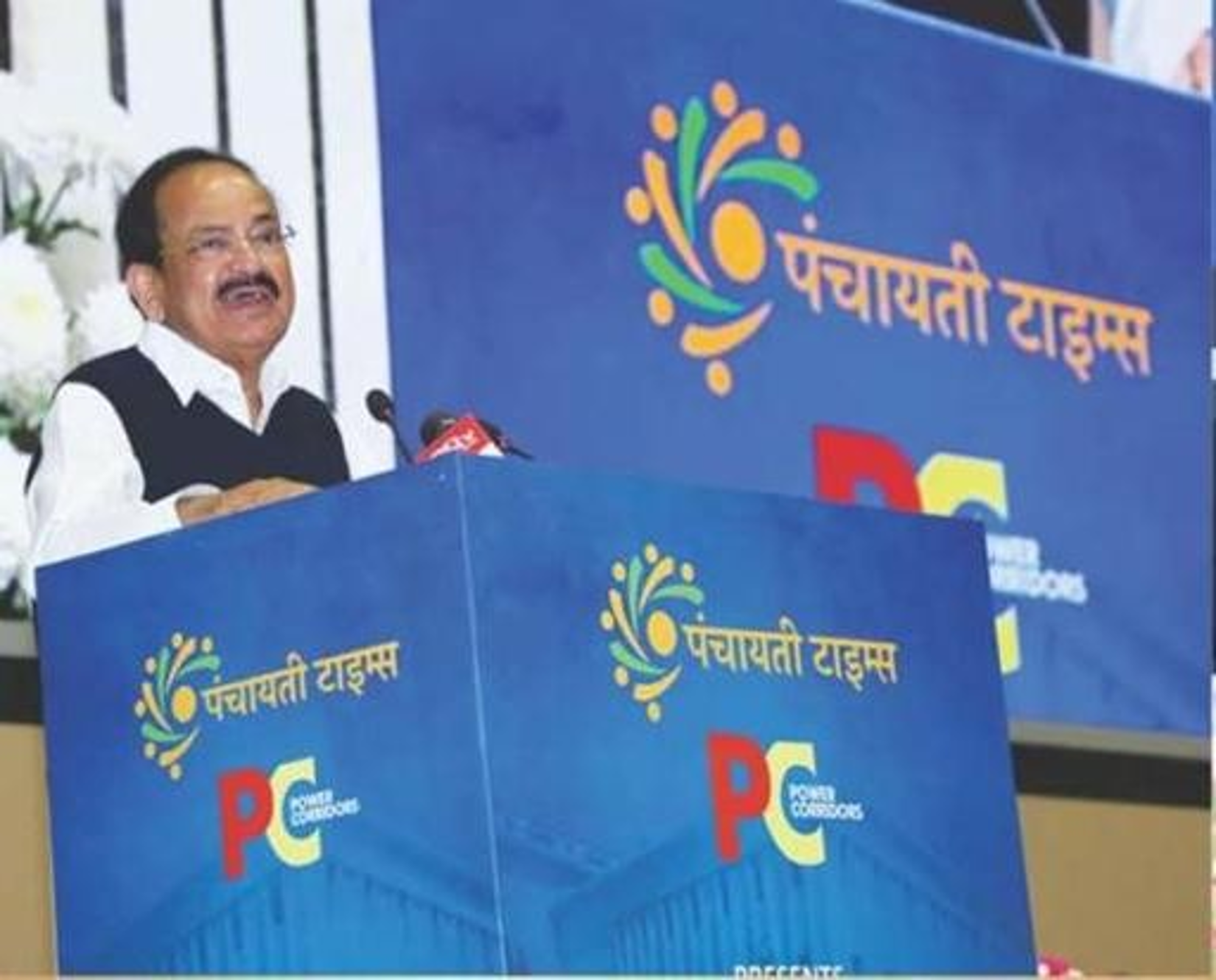
- Vice President of India Shri M. Venkaiah Naidu at a national award ceremony organized by Panchayati Times at Vigyan Bhawan, New Delhi in 2018.
- Editor-in-chief: Nandan Jha
- Categories: News Portal
- Founder: Nandan Jha
- First issue: 2014
- Company: Interactive Forum on Indian Economy
- Country: India
- Based in: New Delhi
- Language: Hindi
- Website: Official Website

Panchayati Times is a digital news portal published from New Delhi, India. Nandan Jha is the founder and chairman of the portal.

== About Panchayati Times ==
Panchayati Times was founded in 2014 by Nandan Jha. It is an initiative of Interactive Forum on Indian Economy (IFIE). IFIE is a Government of India recognized 80G, 12A, 8A complaint nonprofit company.

Panchayati Times was launched on 26 December 2018 at Vigyan Bhawan New Delhi by Vice President of India Sri Venkaiah Naidu, Justice K. G. Balakrishnan (Former Chief Justice of India), Subhash Ghai, Pahlaj Nihalani (film producer), Govinda (actor), N. Biren Singh (Chief Minister of Manipur), Ved Pratap Vaidik (journalist), and Justice Gyan Sudha Misra (Former Judge Supreme Court Of India).

Panchayati Times, as a media partner of Interactive Forum on Indian Economy, organized the first edition of Champions of change awards in 2018 at Vigyan Bhawan, New Delhi. The second edition was held in 2020 at Vigyan Bhawan, New Delhi and the third edition was held in 2021 at Goa, India. It also organized the first edition of champions of change Maharashtra award at Taj Mahal Palace, Mumbai on 30 September' 2021.
