= Gandhi Mandela Awards =

Indian Award

- Awarded for: Peace, Social Welfare, Culture, Health Care, Sports, Education and Innovation
- Sponsored by: Gandhi Mandela foundation
- First award: 2019

Highlights
- Nominations Received: 12
- Website: gandhimandelafoundation.com

Gandhi Mandela Awards is an International award established by "The Gandhi Mandela Foundation" for promoting Gandhian and Nelson Mandela’s values, of community service and social development, selected by world’s biggest constitutional jury headed by Justice K. G. Balakrishnan (Former Chief Justice of India and Former Chairman NHRC India), and includes Justice Dipak Misra (Former Chief Justice of India), Justice Kedar Nath Upadhyay (Former Chief Justice of Nepal & former Chairman NHRC Nepal), Justice Md. Tafazzul Islam (Former Chief Justice of Bangladesh), Justice Gyan Sudha Misra (Former Justice supreme court of India).

The award is conferred annually, and the nominations are invited from the Head of the States including President, Vice president, Prime Minister or any leading public figure from various countries all over the world.

The Mahatma Gandhi and Nelson Mandela are the great world leaders known for their ideals & principles of peace, non - violence, unity & freedom. Both are known as father figures in their respective nations and helped shape their democracies. The Gandhi Mandela Award for Excellence Commemorates the Legacy of the two great men.

Gandhi Mandela Award consists of a Gold Medal & Certificate which is made by Indian Government Mint, Kolkata and contains 85.75 grams of Gold.

== The Jury ==
- Justice K. G. Balakrishnan ( Former Chief Justice of India and Former Chairman NHRC India).
- Justice Dipak Misra (Former Chief Justice of India)
- Justice Kedar Nath Upadhyay (Former Chief Justice of Nepal & former Chairman NHRC Nepal)
- Justice Md. Tafazzul Islam (Former Chief Justice of Bangladesh)
- Justice Gyan Sudha Misra (Former justice Supreme Court of India)

== Nominations ==
- Prime Minister of Nepal Mr. Khadga Prasad Sharma Oli
- First President & Father of Zambia Mr. Kenneth DB Kaunda
- First President and Father of Bangladesh Late Sheikh Mujibur Rahman
- First President and Father of Sri Lanka Late Don Stephen Senanayake
- Former Deputy Prime Minister of India Lal Krishna Advani
- Government of United Arab Emirates
- The first lady of The Republic of Burundi Denise Bucumi Nkurunziza
- President of Democratic Republic of Congo Mr. Felix Tshisekedi
- Prime Minister of Togo Mr. Komi Selom Klassou
- Ambassador of Republic of Congo Mr. Andre Poh

== Gandhi Mandela Award 2019 ==
The first Gandhi Mandela Award for 2019 was conferred to His Holiness the 14th Dalai Lama Tenzin Gyatso in November 2022 for his outstanding contributions in spreading peace and harmony amongst world. Gandhi Mandela Award is world’s one of the most expensive award includes a Gold Medal & Certificate.
