= National Bravery Award =

Indian award for acts of bravery by children

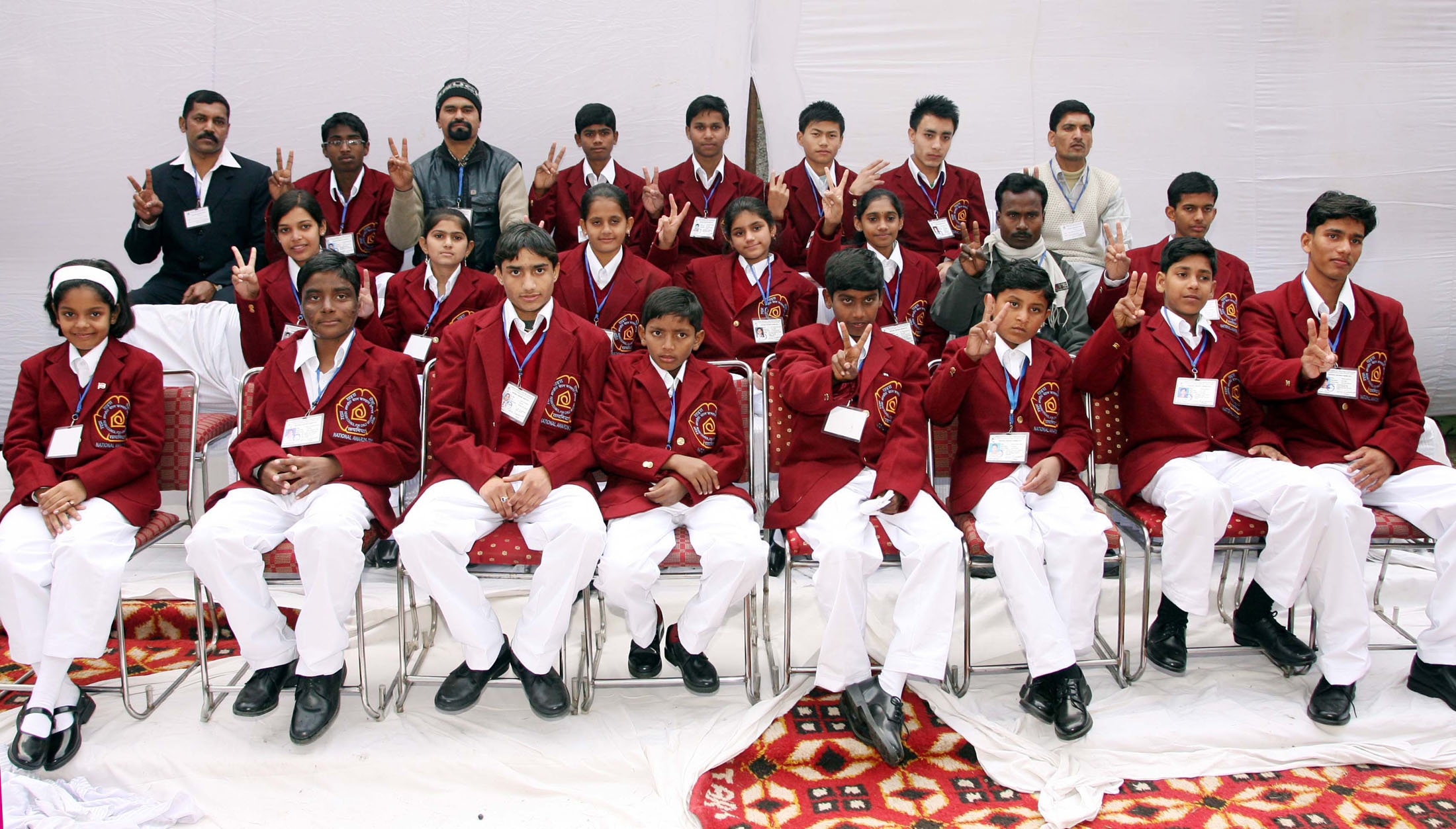
Winners of National bravery awards – 2011

The Iccw Bravery Awards are a set of awards given annually to about 25 Indian children below 18 years of age for "meritorious acts of bravery against all odds". The awards are given by the Indian Council for Child Welfare (ICCW). The award was instituted in 1957.

== ICCW Bravery Awards for Children and Youth ==
The ICCW Bravery Awards consist of eight categories

== Origins ==
On Gandhi Jayanti day, 2 October 1957, India's first prime minister, Jawaharlal Nehru, was watching a performance in Delhi's Ramlila ground, at the Red Fort. During the performance, a short circuit caused a fire to break out in a shamiana (decorated tent). Harish Chandra Mehra, a 14-year-old scout, promptly took out his knife and ripped open the burning tent, saving the lives of hundreds of trapped people. This incident inspired Nehru to ask the authorities to establish an award to honour brave children from all over the country. The first official National Bravery Awards were presented to two Children on 4 February 1958, by Prime Minister Nehru, and the ICCW ( Indian Council for Child Welfare) has continued the tradition ever since.

== Selection process ==
Each year, the ICCW receives applications for the Awards. The applications must be received by 15 October to be eligible for selection.

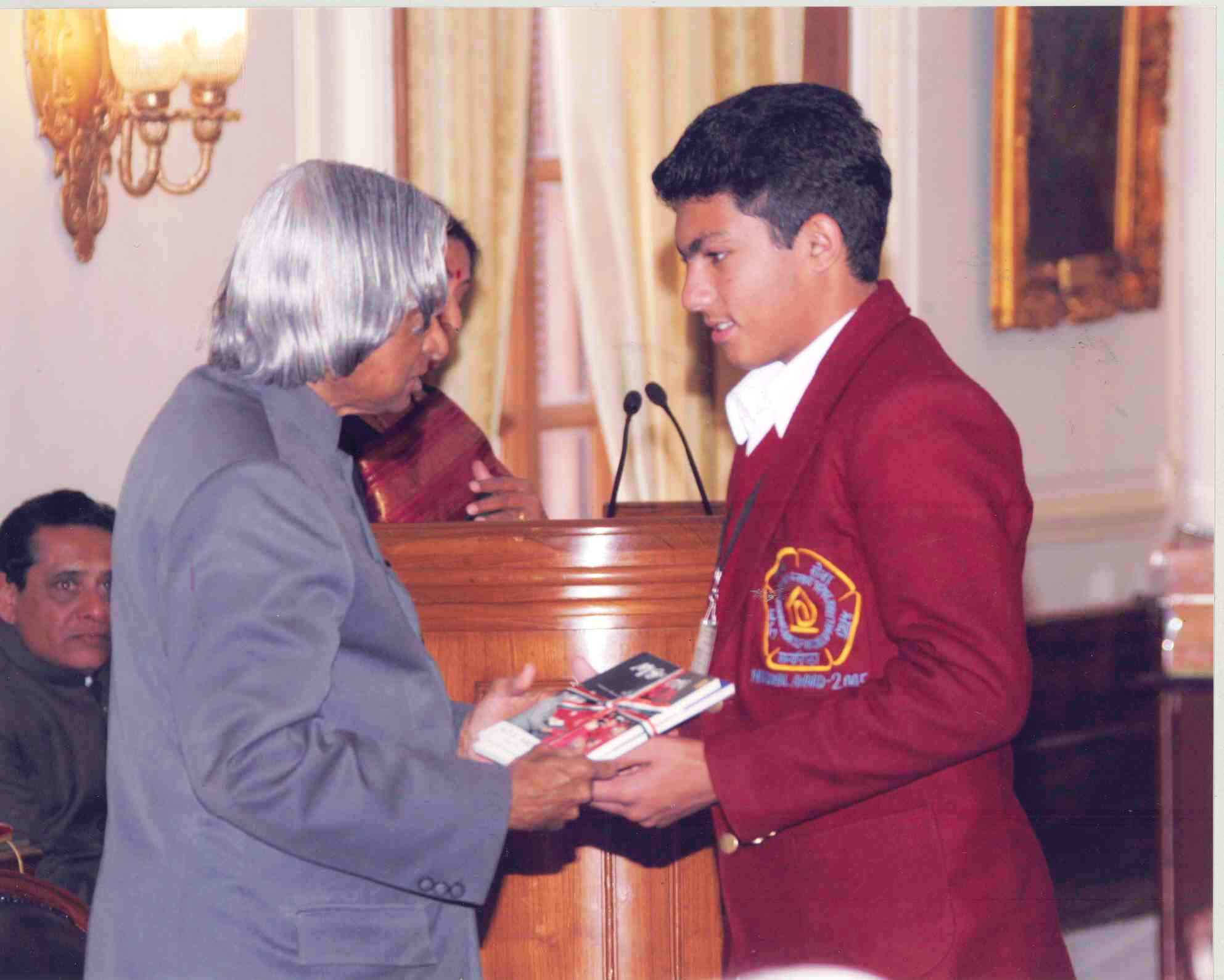
President Abdul Kalam giving away the award to Sanmesh in 2006

Awardees are selected by a committee constituted by the ICCW.

== Ceremony ==
The awards are usually announced and presented in January.

== List of awards ==
=== Bharat Award ===
Year	Name	Act of bravery	Age	Indian state of origin
2022	Azam Quadri	Saved a youtuber from the River Yamuna during an earth quake.	12 Years	Telangana
2012	Vicky Martin Singh	Confronted armed kidnappers and saved a girl.	16 Years	Andhra Pradesh
1996	Vardhana	Confronted armed robber and helped police.	8 Years	Bihar
2000	Sunil Singh	Confronted armed militants who had attacked their village.	9 Years	Jammu & Kashmir
2000	Robert Cruiser	Confronted armed militants who had attacked their village.	13 Years	Jammu & Kashmir
2000	Sunil Chand Rajan	Saved a little child of a 6-year-old sibling from a human-eating panther.	9 years	Uttarakhand
2000	Ayswarya Sambasivan Ramakumari and Sreejesh Sambasivan Ramakumari	Saved their lives and parents' lives from brutal robbery attack at home.	10 years, 14 years	kerala
2001	Surjeet Singh	Fought a night-long battle with a group of 40 militants who had surrounded their village.	18 years	Jammu & Kashmir
2001	Amrik Singh	Fought a night-long battle with a group of 40 militants who had surrounded their village.	20 years	Jammu & Kashmir
2002	Chinmay Sharma	Failed a robbery on a Mumbai train.	7 years	Maharastra
2002	Charu Sharma	Sustained knife injuries while trying to foil a robbery on a Mumbai train.	11 years	Maharashtra
2002	Shambhavi Ray	Fought two men on a motorcycle and foiled their attempt to steal her mother's purse.	13 years	Delhi
2003	C. Vanlalhruaia (posthumously)	Died fighting the dacoits.	17 years	Mizoram
2005	Ratul Chandra Rabha	Chased the militants who killed their school teacher (subsequently one of the militants was caught).	17 years	Assam
2005	Rituparna Boro	Chased the militants who killed their school teacher (subsequently one of the militants was caught).	15 years	Assam
2007	Babita	Saved several schoolmates from drowning when their school bus fell into the Western Yamuna canal. She was studying 11th standard	17 years	Haryana
2007	Amarjeet	Saved several schoolmates from drowning when their school bus fell into the Western Yamuna canal.	15 years	Haryana
2008	No Award			
2009	Gaurav Singh Saini	Saved 50–60 people in the 2008 stampede at the Naina Devi temple	13 years	Haryana
2010	No Award			
2011	Kapil Singh Negi (posthumously)	Helped younger schoolmates cross a flooded stream during rains and landslides, but he failed to save himself.	15 years	Uttarakhand
2012	Tarang Atulbhai Mistry	Saved four people from drowning in Narmada River	17 years	Gujarat
2013	Kumari Mahika Gupta	Saved her brother from floods at Kedarnath (Uttarakhand).	8 years	Delhi
2015	Resham Fatama	An acid attack victim, who was kidnapped by her uncle(mother's cousin). On the way to her coaching class, he forced her into a car and poured acid over her head when she turned down a marriage proposal. She managed to escape.	16 years	Uttar Pradesh
2016	Tarah Peju(Posthumous)	Saved her friends from drowning but failed to manage herself	8 years	Arunachal Pradesh
2017	Nazia	Helped Police stop illegal gambling business	16 years	Uttar Pradesh
2018	Kunwar Divyansh Singh	Saved his younger sister and 7 other kids from a bull attack.	13 years	Uttar Pradesh

=== Sanjay Chopra Award ===
Year	Name	Notes	Age	Indian origin
1998	Akash Grover	Failed Robbery Attempt	10 years	Uttar Pradesh
2000	Prince Kumar and Ashish Kumar	Confronted armed robbers.	12 years	
	Heena Bakshi	Failed robbery attempt		
2001	Rajput Hirani	Saved building fire.	9 years	Haryana
2002	Moneesh Mohan	Saved two children from drowning.	10 years	Dubai
2003	Riyaz Ahmed	Lost his hands and a foot to save a child from a train accident.	9 years	Uttar Pradesh
2004	Harry Chaudhry	Received several stab wounds on his stomach while trying to save his sister from assailant's knife.	13 years	Delhi
2005	Sanmesh Kalyanpur	Saved his sister from drowning during Mumbai Floods.	15 years	Maharashtra
2006	V Teeja Sai (posthumously)	Died while trying to rescue fellow students in river Munneru in Krishna district.	12 years	Andhra Pradesh
2006	C V S Durga Dondieswar (posthumously)	Died while trying to rescue fellow students in river Munneru in Krishna district.	13 years	Andhra Pradesh
2007	Yuktarth Shrivastava	Saved his 11-month-old sister from stray dogs, who attacked them.	6 years	Chhattisgarh
2008	Saumik Mishra	Single-handedly fought with two goons who entered his home for theft.	15 years	Uttar Pradesh
2009	Karan Nishad	Saved five people from drowning.	11 years	Uttar Pradesh
2010	Priyanshu Joshi	Single-handedly fought off a leopard which attacked his sister on their way to school.	10 years	Uttarakhand
2011	Om Prakash Yadav	Saved schoolmates from a burning van.	12 years	Uttar Pradesh
2012	Gajendra Ram	Saved a child from drowning in a well.	11 years	Chhattisgarh
2013	Shubam Santosh Chaudari	Saved two children when their school van caught fire.	17 years	Maharashtra
2017	Karanbeer Singh	Saved 15 children after a vehicle plunged into a drain	16 years	Punjab
2018	Gohil Jayaram singh			

=== Geeta Chopra Award ===
Year	Name	Notes	Age	Indian origin
1987	Monalisa	Saved a deaf from the attack of bulls	7 years	Odisha
1996	Harsha shivarakash	Helped 2 boys from drowning	26	Karnataka
1998	Anchal Grover	Foiled robbery attempt.	8 years	Uttar Pradesh
2000	Shubham Padhy	Foiled robbery attempt.	13 years	Haryana
2001	Satyajeet Patra (posthumously)	Lost life while trying to rescue four other children from drowning.	13 years	Rajasthan
2002	Guddiben Kalubhai Masher	Saved an infant's life from a wild animal by fighting that wild animal.	13 years	_
2003	Ramseena R.M.	Lost her leg while trying to save a young girl from a speeding car.	12 years	Kerala
2004	Boya Geethanjali	For fighting seven armed Naxalites at Ananthapuram village, securing the release of a woman Member of the Legislative Assembly they were trying to abduct, and forcing the Naxalites to flee.	12 years	Andhra Pradesh
2005	Seidalyne Mawtyllup	For saving her three-month-old sister from a burning house.	10 years	Meghalaya
2006	Vandana Yadav	For fighting three local goons single-handedly, suffering 17 stab wounds, and later turning up to identify culprits in the police station.	13 years	Uttar Pradesh
2007	Lalrempuii (posthumously)	For resisting her rapist even though she died in the bargain.	14 ½ years	Mizoram
2008	Prachi Santosh Sen	Saved four children from electrocution, suffering severe burns to the left hand.	10 years	Madhya Pradesh
2009	Maibam Prity Devi	Saved several lives when she rushed and threw away a grenade hurled at her family-owned shop by miscreants, herself hit by exploding splinter.	10 years	Manipur
2010	Jismi PM	Saved the lives of a nine-year-old boy and an eight-year-old girl from drowning in a river.	13 years	Kerala
2011	Mittal Mahendrabhai Patadiya	Faced armed robbers and foiled a robbery attempt.	13 years	Gujarat
2012	Renu	Exposed physical and psychological abuse at her shelter home.	18 yrs	New Delhi
2013	Kumari Maleka Singh Tak	Displayed rare grit and determination in fighting off her molesters.	16 yrs	Rajasthan
2014	Kumari Gunjan Sharma	Displayed exemplary bravery in saving her friends from the clutches of an abductor	13 yrs	Assam
2017	Netravati M. Chavan (Posthumous)	saved two boys from drowning but failed to save herself	14 yrs 10 months	Karnataka
2018	Nitisha Negi (posthumously)	Saved her classmate from drowning but failed to save herself		delhi

=== Bapu Gaidhani Award ===
Year	Name	Act of bravery	Age	Indian state of origin
1994	Nilesh Umale	Alone saved 4 drowning girls from a flooded river.	12 years	Maharashtra
2001	Andy Fernandes, Ashwini Kamath, Shruthi Ullal, Sridevi Damodar	The girls together saved 18 of their classmates from drowning when a boat capsized.	14 – 15 years	Karnataka
2002		10 years		
	Dhanajay Ramrao Ingole		13 years	
	Rinku Burman		13 years	
2003	Vivek Purkayastha	Bravely fought with the dacoits.	14 years	Assam
	Asit Ranjal Sama (posthumously)	Lost life while trying to save other children from drowning.	17 years	Orissa
	Lalramdinthara (posthumously)	Lost life while trying to save other children from drowning.	15 years	Mizoram
2004	N. Kandha Kumar (posthumously)	Saved two of his schoolmates by pulling them off the school van, stuck at a level crossing; died while trying to save another.	11 years	Tamil Nadu
	Master Lalthanzawna		11 years	Mizoram
	Majda Alias Babli	Saved several children between the ages of 3–6 years, from drowning in the Ganges canal.	11 years	Uttarakhand
2005	Dugi alias Minati	Revolted against child marriage.	14 years	Orissa
	C Susheela	Revolted against child marriage.	14 years	Orissa
	Mahesh Kumar	Saved an 11-year-old girl from the jaws of a tiger.	15 years	Uttarakhand
2006	Asma Ayyub Khan	Helped move 35–40 children from her institution to a safe place, during the 2005 Mumbai floods.	13½ years	Maharashtra
	Sushila Gurjar	Fought against the social evil of child marriage.	13 years	Rajasthan
	Shilpa Janbandhu	Participated in an anti-naxalite movement, Salwa Judum, despite threats.	15 years	Chhattisgarh
2007	Raipalli Vamsi	Saved five girls from drowning, by diving into the Nagavali river thrice.	12 years	Andhra Pradesh
	Boney Singh	saved two boys from drowning in a water tank near Sagolband Meino Leirak, Imphal West-I.	16½ years	Manipur
	Amol Aghi (posthumously)	Died chasing robbers in Geeta colony, Panipat.	15 years	Haryana
2008	Asu Kanwar	Displayed amazing courage in standing up against child marriage.	14 years	Rajasthan
	Kavita Kanwar (posthumously) and Seema Kanwar	Saved their friends from an accidental fire; Kavita died in this accident.	16 years	Chhattisgarh
2009	Devansh Bidhuri (posthumously)	Died while saving her brother and his friend from drowning	10 years	Uttar Pradesh
	Deepak Kumar Kori (posthumously)	Died while trying to save a girl from drowning as villagers looked on.	12 years	Uttar Pradesh
	Vijith V Edonath	Saved four children from drowning in a river.	16 years	Kerala
	Narendrasinh Solanki	Saved his father from a crocodile in Dhadhar River.	17 years	Gujarat
2010	Vishnudas K.	Saved two children from drowning.	17 years	Kerala
	Moonis Khan	Saved an old man from a railway accident.	15 years	Madhya Pradesh
	Ipi Basar	Rescued his paralyzed 70-year-old aunt and 7-year-old cousin after her village caught fire.	16 years	Arunachal Pradesh
2011	Adithya Gopal (posthumously)	Tried to save his friend from drowning but died.	14 yrs	Arunachal Pradesh
	Uma Shankar	Rescued victims of a bus accident.	14 yrs	Delhi
	Anjali Singh Gautam	Saved her younger brother in a naxalite attack.	15 yrs	Chhattisgarh
2012	Hali Raghunath Baraf	Saved her pregnant elder sister from a panther.	15 yrs	Maharashtra
	Vijay Kumar Sainik			Uttar Pradesh
	Akanksha Gaute	Fought alone with 4 people following her father's bike.	16 yrs	Chhattisgarh
2013	Sanjay Navasu Sutar	Outstanding bravery in fighting Leopard.	17.5 yrs	Maharashtra
	Akshay Jairam Roj	Outstanding bravery in fighting Leopard	13 years	Maharashtra
	Kumari Mausmi Kashyap (Posthumously)	Sacrificed her life in trying to save a girl from drowning. She has been given the award posthumously.	11 yrs	Uttar Pradesh
	Aryan Raj Shukla (Posthumously)	Sacrificed his life in saving four of his friends' lives by his sense of duty and heroic action. He has been given an award posthumously.	14 yrs	Uttar Pradesh
	Rumoh meto	Helped his elder brother (Milu Mega) stuck to a 33KV high-voltage line.	13 years	Arunachal Pradesh
2016	Tushar Verma	Risked his life to rescue an elderly neighbour couple with their three cows and two bulls when the house began to burn.		Chhattisgarh

=== Other recipients ===
Note: Many others who have received these awards are not listed in this due to the unavailability of the complete information about them.

- 1982: Ajmal Khan Gauhar (Bareilly, Uttar Pradesh)
- 1985: Abdhesh Kumar Gupta, (Etah, Uttar Pradesh).
- 1987: Naga Varaprasad Surikuchi (6) won National Bravery Award for saving his brother from drowning in a well. ('Bhimavaram, Andhrapradesh')
- 1993: Prem Prakash Pathak, (lives in Delhi), native place: Gangolihat, District: Pithoragarh (Uttarakhand).
- 1993: M Pavitra 6 years (Bhopal Madhya Pradesh/Native K Keeranur, Oddanchatram Taluk/Settled at Chennai, Tamil Nadu). Youngest awardee.
- 1987: Vikas D. Satam (Vashi, Navi Mumbai, Maharashtra), Saurabh Oberoi (posthumous, Sri Ganganagar, Rajasthan) and Savottam Jeevan Raksha Padhak 1988; Shantanu Oberoi (Sri Ganganagar, Rajasthan, ICCW-Rajasthan 1988)
- 1990: Prashant Singh (Rewa, Madhya Pradesh), Prabhakar (Uttar Pradesh).
- 1994: Nilesh Umale, (12) (Vidarbha, Maharashtra)
- 1995: Shivshankar Madhukar Bidri killer earthquake 1993 two persons saved life
- 1997: Nandan Kumar Jha, (15) (Adityapur, Jamshedpur, Jharkhand)
- 2000: Richa Tiwari,(Sagar, Madhya Pradesh) Saved her sister Mansi from drowning in a pond.
- 2001: Aakash Sabharwal (Delhi), Amrik Singh (Jammu & Kashmir) Ashwini Kamath, Andy Tenita Fernandes, Shruti Ullal, Sridevi Damodar, K.J. Kamaraju and Shilpa Satish Tamadaddi (Karnataka); Katta Trinadh and Putta Someshwar (Andhra Pradesh); Sanath (Kerala), Lalitha Devi Yadav, Mehul Sanyal (Bhopal), and Ritu Singh Tomar (Madhya Pradesh), Nijal Omprakash Patil, Narendra Shantaram Bithale, Sharvari Sudhir Mali, Mitali Khanapurkar of Maharashtra, Bhoopendra Singh Bainiwal (Rajasthan), Reshma Mohapatra from Orissa (posthumous), Nikhil (Posthumous), Lalmunsanga, Johny Lalnunfela (Mizoram).
- 2002: Prithi Singh (10), Aparajit Singh (11), Swapnali Harishchandra Ghag (13), Rukaiya Begum (14), Nikky Maria Jacob (14), Jessamma George (16), Ashok Kumar Choudhary (18), Abdul Razak CM (16), Mumthaz TM (12), Balkrishna Upadhyay (17), Shreshthi Amrit Gorule (17), Naseer Khan (13) and Justin K Tom (19).
- 2003: Chuneshwari Kothalis, Ramsadharan (Chhattisgarh), Nitin Uttamrao Kakde, Dyaneshwar Manikrao Kakade, Raju Namdev Kakde, Satyam Mahendra Khandekar, Skiewtidaris Lyngkhoi (Meghalaya), Pratap Vikubhai Khachar (Gujarat), Neelam Rani, Sarita Tyagi, Sunita Devi Sighdoya, Swati Tyagi, Sushma Rani (Haryana), G. Kranthi Kumar, Thotakura Mahesh (Andhra Pradesh) Ram Nayan Yadav (Uttar Pradesh), Harish Rana (Uttarakhand), Ajith Kumar P.T, Saneesh K.S, Suramya U.R. (Kerala).
- 2004:Hotilal, Km Mahima Tiwari both from Uttar Pradesh, Master Ramandeep Singh and Master Pawan Kumar of Punjab (Joint Deed), Master RK Rahul Singh of Manipur, Km Shiney TA, Master Sajan Antony, Master TP Krishna Prasad and Master Johncy Samuel all from Kerala, Master Khiangdingliana of Mizoram, Km Priyanka of Haryana, Master Gopal Singh Sondia of Madhya Pradesh, Master B Sai Kushal of Andhra Pradesh and Master Vinod R. Jain of Karnataka.
- 2005:Master Sarath sabu, Km. Divya TV, Late Master Shibu T (all from Kerala), Master Laxman (Chhattisgarh), Master Mukesh Kumar Tanwar (Madhya Pradesh), Master Puttijungshi (Nagaland), Master Nelson Karam, Km L. Pusparani Devi (both from Manipur), Master Nagarani Venkateswara Rao (Andhra Pradesh), Master Santosh Ramesh Dahe (Maharashtra).
- 2006: Master Aakash Saha (New Delhi), S/O Ravi Saha & Purnima Saha was awarded for helping and donating blood at the age of 15, was taken under custody for donating blood being a minor by Delhi Police however was applauded later and awarded by Dr A P J Abdul Kalam on Republic Day.
- 2006: Km. Deepa Kumari, Master Sudhir Jakhar, Master Pawan Kumar Parashar, Master Rajender Kumar (all from Rajasthan), Kumari Anita Singh Lodh (Madhya Pradesh), Master David Kino (Arunachal Pradesh), Master Michael N.George (Delhi), Master Joel Salim Jacob (Kerala), Master Parth S Sutaria, Kum Antara Srivastava, Kum Ankita Ashok Bhosle (all from Maharashtra), Km. Paonam Babyrose Devi (Manipur), Km. Pooja Kabadwal (Uttarakhand), Master Rahul Chaurasia (Uttar Pradesh).
- 2007: Master Raveendra Halder, Master Ravi Kumar Jhariya, Master Awadhesh Kumar Jhariya, Master Manas Nishad (all from Chhattisgarh), Master Vishnu C.S., Master Bijin Babu (both from Kerala), Master Kavvampalli Rajkumar, Master Pinjari Chinigi Sab (both from Andhra Pradesh), Km. Meher Legha (Noida, UP), Master Ankit Rai, Late Master Abhishake and Late Master Suraj (all from Haryana), Master Subhash Kumar (U.P.), Km. Congress Kanwar (Rajasthan) and Master Sunil Kumar P.N. (Karnataka).
- 2008: Master Gagan J. Murthy, Km. Bhoomika J. Murthy (Karnataka), Km. Silver Kharbani (Meghalaya), Master Yumkhaibam Addison Singh (Manipur), Master Vishal Suryaji Patil (Maharashtra), Master Shahanshah (Uttar Pradesh), Km. Dinu K.G. (Kerala), Master M. Marudu Pandi (Tamil Nadu), Km. Anita Kora, Km. Rina Kora (West Bengal), Km. Manjusha A (Kerala), Km. Kritika Jhanwar (Rajasthan), Km. Hina Quereshi (Rajasthan), Master Manish Bansal (Haryana) and Master Rahul (New Delhi). For the first time, an award-winner's real name was withheld, as he identified the men who planted bombs on Barakhamba Road in New Delhi, during 13 September 2008 Delhi bombings, and helped police make sketches of the suspects.
- 2009: Uddesh R. Ramnathkar (Goa); Zonunsanga and Lalrammawia (Mizoram); Sujith R., Amal Anthony, Krishnapriya K. and Sujith Kumar P. (all from Kerala); Dijekshon Syiem (Meghalaya); Thoi Thoi Khumanthem (Manipur); Vaishaliben Sambhubhai Solanki (Gujarat); Rekha Kalindi, Sunita Mahato and Afsana Khatun, (all from West Bengal); and Yogesh Kumar Jangid (Rajasthan).
- 2010: Kalpana Sonowal and Rekhamoni Sonowal (Assam), Rahul Kurrey and Parvati Amlesh (Chhattisgarh), Anoop. M. and Raj Narayanan (Kerala), Rohit Maruti Mulik (Maharashtra), Md. Nurul Huda (Macnipur), Freedy Nongsiej and Lovelystar K. Sohphoh (Meghalaya), Lalmawizuali (Mizoram), Gurjeevan Singh (Punjab), Late Km. Chhampa Kanwar and Shrawan Kumar (6yrs) (Rajasthan), Bibek Sharma (Sikkim), Uttam Kumar (Uttar Pradesh), Late Km. Shruti Lodhi (Uttarakhand) and Sunita Murmu (West Bengal).
- 2011: Yandam Amara Uday Kiran and Suthrapu Shiva Prasad (Andhra Pradesh), Ranjan Pradhan and Km. Sheetal Sadvi Saluja (Chhattisgarh), Km. Divyaben Mansangbhai Chauhan (Gujarat), Sandesh P Hegde and Km. Sindhushree B.A. (Karnataka), Mohammed Nishadh V.P., Anshif C.K. and Sahsad K (Kerala), Johnson Tourangbam and Kshetrimayum Rakesh Singh (Manipur), Late C. Lalduhawma (Mizoram), Km. Prasannta Shandilya (Orissa), Dungar Singh (Rajasthan), G. Parameswaran (Tamil Nadu), Late Km. Lovely Verma (Uttar Pradesh) and Late Km. Saudhita Barman (West Bengal).
- 2012: Ramdinthara (Mizoram, posthumous), Devansh Tiwari (Chhattisgarh), Mukesh Nishad (Chhattisgarh), Lalrinhlua (Mizoram), E. Suganthan (Tamil Nadu), Ramith.K, (Kerala), Mebin Cyriac (Kerala), Vishnu MV (Kerala), Koroungamba Kuman (Manipur, 7 yrs), Sameep Anil Pandit (Maharashtra), Viswendra Lohkna (Uttar Pradesh), Satendra Lohkana (Uttar Pradesh), Pawan Kumar Kanaujiya (Uttar Pradesh), Mahika Sharma (Assam) Stripleaseman Mylliem (Meghalaya), Sapna Kumari Meena (Rajasthan), Suhail KM (Karnataka).
- 2015: Labhanshu Sharma (15) (Rishikesh, Uttarakhand)
