= Singhwahini =

Gram Panchayat in Bihar

Singhbahni
- Singhwahini

Government
  - Mukhiya: Ritu Jaiswal (RJD)

Area
  - Total: 18.6 km^{2} (7.2 sq mi)

Population (2021)
  - Total: 15,558
  - Density: 836/km^{2} (2,170/sq mi)
- Time zone: IST (UTC+5:30)
- Postal code: 843317
- Area code: 219109

Singhwahini is a Gram Panchayat in Bihar. Arun Kumar husband of Ritu Jaiswal is Mukhiya of this Panchayat. From Singhwahini view of Himalayas looks Stunning.

== Nearby places ==
- Sitamarhi - 33 KM
- Motihari - 76 KM
- Madhubani - 83 KM
- Darbhanga - 91 KM
- Muzaffarpur - 93 KM
