= Charu Sharma (athlete) =

Indian athlete and performer (born 1992)

- Born: 24 March 1992 (age 33); Jaipur, India
- Education: Mount Holyoke College, United States
- Occupations: Explorer, Athlete, Performer, Writer
- Known for: Power Woman 2012, National Bravery Award
- Website: CharuSharma.com

Charu Sharma (born 24 March 1992) is an Indian athlete and performer. She has a whole chapter on her in Hindi textbooks in Maharashtra, she is one of India's young achievers.

== Early life and education ==
Charu Sharma was born on 24 March 1992 in Jaipur in a family of civil servants, doctors, and engineers.

== Awards and accolades ==
Sharma is a recipient of 5 National Awards in bravery and academic achievement.

== Train robbery episode ==
Charu Sharma (9 at the time) and her brother Chinmay Sharma (6 at the time) fought in a train robbery and saved women in a Mumbai local train in April 2002. They were honored by the National Bravery Award by the then Prime Minister Atal Bihari Vajpayee on Republic Day 26 January 2003. The President Dr. Abdul Kalam awarded them the President's Medal for Gallantry the same year. This story was incorporated as a chapter 'Sibling Gallantry' in the English textbook of Class IX in Maharashtra.
