= 2008 Jodhpur stampede =

Human stampede in Rajasthan, India

Chamunda Devi stampede
- Date: 30 September 2008
- Time: 05:30 IST
- Location: Jodhpur, Rajasthan India
- Deaths: 224
- Injuries: 425+
- Human stampede, many suffered from asphyxiation as they were crushed to death

A human stampede occurred on 30 September 2008, at the Chamunda Devi temple in Jodhpur, Rajasthan, India, in which 224 people were killed and more than 425 injured. The 15th-century temple is dedicated to the goddess Chamunda Devi and is located within the premises of Mehrangarh Fort.

About 25,000 Hindu pilgrims were visiting the temple to mark the first day of the nine-day-long Navratri, a major festival in Hinduism dedicated to the worship of Goddess Durga.

== Cause ==
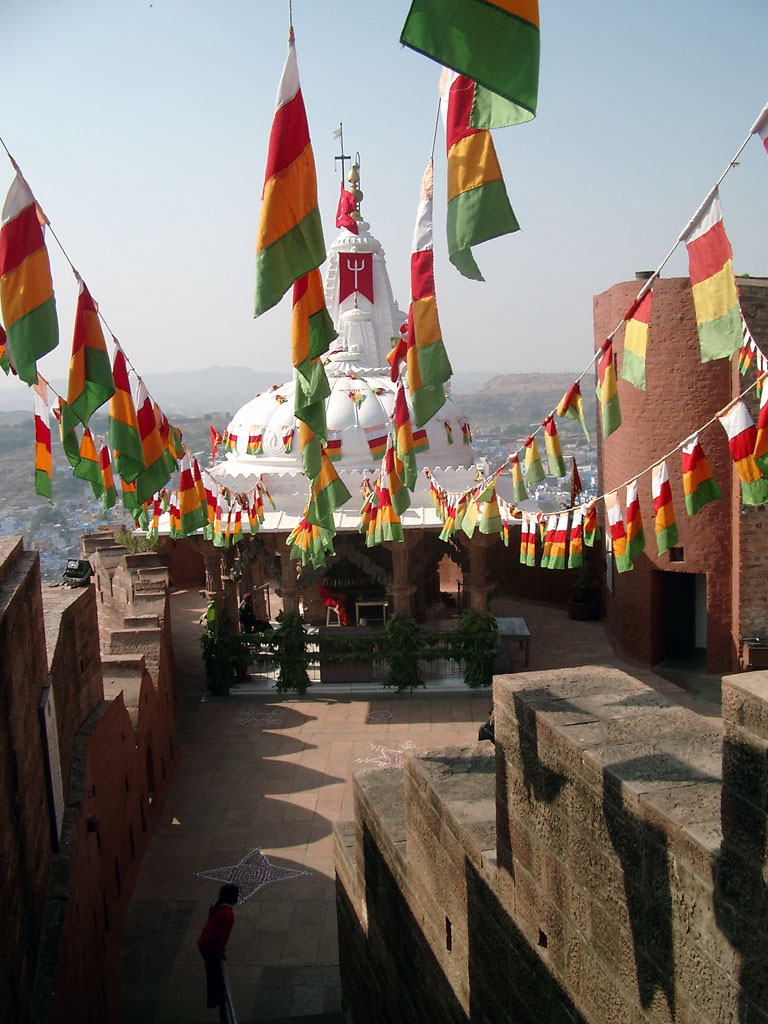
Chamunda Devi Temple, the location of the stampede

The devotees scrambled towards the door the moment it opened, resulting in the destruction of the barricades. Many people were injured when they lost their footing on the slope approaching the temple.

According to The Times of India, local reports suggest that a bomb blast in nearby Mehrangarh created panic among the pilgrims resulting in the stampede. However, the BBC News reported that a collapsing wall may have also caused the stampede. Some eyewitnesses told CNN-IBN that a rumour about a bomb being planted in the temple caused panic among pilgrims.

Others said there was a scramble in the men's queue; some devotees slipped and soon there was a massive resultant stampede where a day of celebration turned into one of mourning.

An eyewitness also said that the path leading to the temple was very narrow with no emergency exit routes.

== Aftermath ==
Indian Army doctors were called to assist the local authorities in the relief operation. Bharatiya Janata Party's Rajnath Singh assured speedy relief to the victims of the tragedy. Chief Minister Vasundhara Raje visited the site and ordered inquiry into the incident.

Local authorities revealed that most of the dead were men as the queue for women was separate.

== Reactions ==
Uttarakhand Chief Minister B C Khanduri, Akhilesh Yadav and Governor B L Joshi expressed grief over the death of the pilgrims at the Chamunda Devi temple. A Raj Bhavan statement issued a condolence message saying Joshi conveyed his deepest sorrow to the bereaved families of the dead and said he would pray for the speedy recovery of those injured in the incident. Khanduri followed too in expressing grief over the accident. He also directed District Magistrates of all the 13 districts of his state to make special arrangements at religious places as they are expected to attract large crowds during the Navratra period.

Jodhpur Muslims decided to keep the Eid celebrations next day a low-key affair. Local Muslim youth joined rescue teams, ferried victims to hospitals and donated blood.

== See also ==
- 2008 Naina Devi temple stampede
