= Ritu Jaiswal =

Indian politician

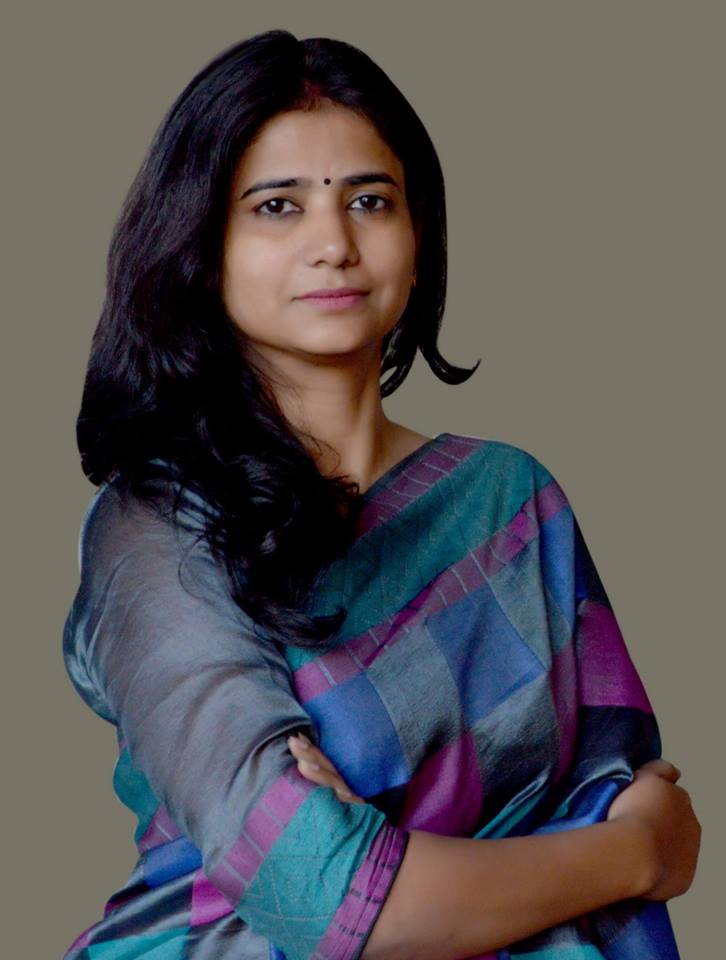

Bharatiya Janata Party

Personal details
- Born: 1977 (age 48–49) Hajipur, Bihar, India
- Party: Bharatiya Janata Party
- Spouse: Arun Kumar (m. 1996)
- Children: 2
- Education: Vaishali Mahila College
- Awards: Champions of Change

Ritu Jaiswal is an Indian politician who is former State President of Rashtriya Janata Dal (Women). She served as the State Spokersperson of Rashtriya Janata Dal from 2021 to 2023. She had been the national award winning Mukhiya of Singhwahini Gram Panchayat in Sitamarhi, Bihar.

== Early life ==
Ritu Jaiswal was born in Hajipur, Bihar on March 1, 1977. She pursued her schooling in Bihar and later obtained a degree in Arts from the Vaishali Mahila College, Bihar. Her academic background helped shape her strong sense of social justice and community service. Ritu was deeply influenced by the social conditions in rural Bihar and decided to dedicate her career to improving the lives of marginalized communities.

== Career in Politics ==
Ritu Jaiswal began her political career driven by the desire to bring positive change at the grassroots level. She initially gained recognition for her work as a Mukhiya (Village Head) of Singhwahini Panchayat in the Sonbarsa block of Sitamarhi district, Bihar. Elected in 2016, Ritu Jaiswal transformed the village with her progressive vision, focusing on key issues like education, healthcare, sanitation, and women’s empowerment.

Her exemplary work as a Mukhiya won her several accolades, and she became a role model for rural development in Bihar. She was particularly noted for promoting transparency in governance and ensuring citizen participation in local decision-making processes.

== Political Candidacy ==
In the 2020 Bihar Legislative Assembly elections, Ritu Jaiswal contested from the Parihar Assembly constituency under the banner of Rashtriya Janata Dal (RJD). Although she lost the election by a thin margin of just 1,549 votes, her grassroots popularity and commitment to social causes continued to earn her widespread respect.

In year 2024, Rashtriya Janata Dal fielded her from the Sheohar Lok Sabha constituency, where she got widespread support but lost by a small margin of 29,143 votes. Her leadership style, which emphasizes development, social justice, and community upliftment, has garnered her a strong following among the people of Bihar.

In the 2025 Bihar Legislative Assembly elections, Ritu Jaiswal again contested from the Parihar Assembly constituency, and remained at number 2. Significantly, she defeated RJD's official candidate.

== Social Work ==
In addition to her political career, Ritu Jaiswal is known for her extensive social work. She has consistently advocated for women's rights, rural development, and sustainable livelihood programs. Her focus on improving public infrastructure, especially in the field of sanitation, water supply, and education, has been widely praised.

Jaiswal has worked on several development projects, including the construction of roads and bridges in remote areas and initiatives to bring better healthcare to underserved populations. Her hands-on approach to governance and her deep engagement with the local community has earned her the nickname "Mukhiya Didi."

== Achievements and Awards ==
- Awarded National Panchayat Award in 2019 in the category "Thematic-Community Based Organisation (CBOs) Individuals Taking Voluntary Action".
- Ritu Jaiswal was given the Champions of Change (award) 2018 by the Vice President of India Venkaiah Naidu at Vigyan Bhavan, New Delhi on 26 December 2018.
- Awarded Flame Leadership Award
- Ritu Jaiswal were invited as speaker at SEETalks in Indian Institute of Technology Bombay along with Ranjan Mistry, Indian Social Entrepreneur; Anand Kumar; and Ashish Vidyarti

== Personal life ==
Ritu Jaiswal is married and is the mother of two children. Her husband, Arun Kumar, has been an IAS-allied officer, who took voluntary retirement to teach students for free. The family resides in Bihar. Despite her busy political and social schedule, Ritu Jaiswal remains deeply connected to her roots and continues to work for the betterment of rural Bihar.

== Vision ==
Ritu Jaiswal’s vision is to create a more just and equitable society by ensuring the upliftment of marginalized communities. Her leadership focuses on empowering women, promoting transparency in governance, and ensuring that basic human rights, such as access to clean water, education, and healthcare, are made available to all citizens.
