= Labhanshu Sharma =

Indian wrestler

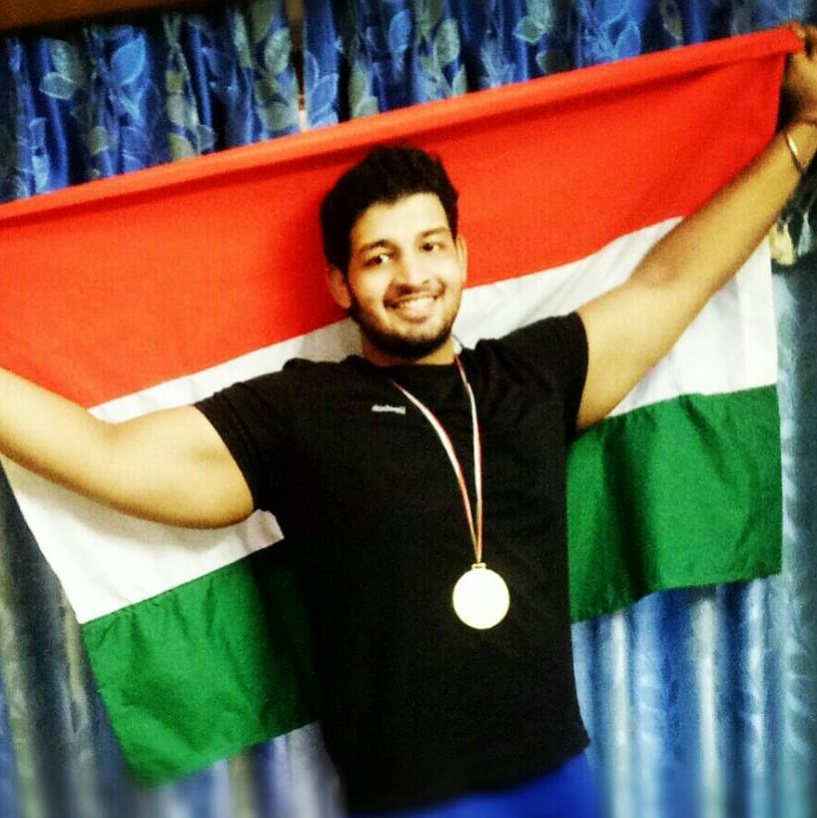

Personal information
- Full name: Labhanshu Sharma
- Nickname: Pahalwan Jee
- Born: Labhanshu Rishikesh, Uttarakhand, India
- Education: Netaji Subhas National Institute of Sports
- Height: 185.5 cm (6 ft 1.0 in) (2021)
- Weight: 97 kg (214 lb) (2021)

Sport
- Country: India

Labhanshu Sharma is an Indian wrestler, world peace activist and winner of gold medals in Asian International Games and Indo Nepal International Wrestling Tournament held in Sri Lanka and Nepal. He also received the National Bravery Award from the prime minister of India, Narendra Modi, in 2015 after saving two individuals from drowning in river Ganga in Rishikesh.

== Early life and career ==
Labhanshu was born and raised in Rishikesh, Uttarakhand to a traditional family. He is the youngest child of Suresh Chand Sharma, a former wrestler of the Indian Army. Labhanshu started his wrestling career at the age of 14 by winning the "Nau Shera Dangal", a 150-year-old wrestling tradition that is organized every year in Delhi. He was the youngest wrestler to win the "Nau Shera Dangal". In 2012 Labhanshu won the state-level wrestling championship in Uttarakhand. He won his first gold medal after competing in the National School Games of India. He also won 7 gold medals at national-level matches. In 2016-17 he fought in the Asian International Games and Indo Nepal International Wrestling Tournament, where he won multiple gold medals under the category of 120 kg.

For its 12th season, Indian television reality show "Bigg Boss" invited Labhanshu Sharma.

In 2017, Labhanshu won a silver medal in the first KD Jadhav International Wrestling Tournament held in Talkatora Stadium, New Delhi.

== Anti Drug Campaign ==
Sharma is also running an anti-drug campaign for saving youth. In 2016, he was invited to participate in the World Youth Conference in Kuala Lumpur; his speech motivated many students to go against drug, alcohol, and tobacco abuse.

== OROP protest ==
Labhanshu Sharma played a major role in implementing of One Rank, One Pension scheme for veteran Indian Army soldiers. He returned his bravery award and medal to the government in agitation to support ex-army personnel. He did 3 days fast strike at Jantar Mantar Delhi.

== World Record ==
Labhanshu Sharma made it to the Unique World Records by pulling a 20-ton truck in the capital city of Georgia, Tbilisi, on 20 December 2017.

== World Peace Journey ==
In 2019, Trivendra Singh Rawat, Chief Minister of Uttarakhand flagged off to Labhanshu Sharma's "World Peace Journey". With the message of Love, Peace, and Happiness and the fight against terrorism, Labhanshu Sharma has traveled from Dehradun to London via 32 countries including India, Nepal, China, Kyrgyzstan, Kazakhstan, Uzbekistan, Russia, and 24 European countries and the United Kingdom. This journey helped him in presenting the motto of Indian culture of "Vasudev Kutumbakam" to a considerably large number of people across the countries. The message of One World One Religion, Humanity, Peace, Love and Happiness and Fight against Terrorism was spread in the form of visual representations on his travel vehicle and also through Mementos. The mission of his journey was to raise the voice against Terrorism and eliminating all kinds of Drug abuse by trying to fill the gaps between people-to-people communication across the countries. He shared the message of World Peace, Love, and Happiness by the visual representations on his traveling vehicle and also by sharing the pamphlets of our Mission to the people we met across the countries.

He tried to make people aware of his stance on- Say No to Terrorism, World Peace Love and Happiness, Anti Drug Abuse, Vasudev Kutumbakam

== Delhi Riots 2020 ==
In 2020, Labhanshu Sharma has been working extensively to promote religious harmony in Delhi. Delhi Riots in 2020, fueled by the fanatic sections of both Hindu and Muslim communities of Delhi in February 2020, disheartened him the most and it compelled him to get on the streets to promote love and compassion amidst the riot. He distributed sweets and daily essentials to riot-affected vicinities and brought the people of rival communities together and made them hug each other. Also, he emphasized the importance of having a liberal mindset towards others and their faith. He has been a social activist and being a national bravery awardee he feels that it is his duty to work towards the larger interest of society. He raises a voice against terrorism, drug abuse, and the rising religious extremism in the country. His social activities during Delhi Riots was recognized by Nepal Gandhi Peace Foundation and the organization bestowed him with an honorary doctorate in Gandhian Philosophy, Peace and Humanity.

== Bharat Kesari ==
Sharma won the Bharat Kesari Wrestling Dangal 2021 held in Tamil Nadu.

== Awards and recognition ==
- National Bravery Award by Prime Minister Narendra Modi in 2015
- Uttarakhand Ratna.
- Dr. A.P.J. Abdul Kalam Award by former president of India Pranab Mukherjee
- Young Achiever Award
- National Youth Icon Award
- Rashtriya Nirman Award
- Swami Vivekananda Award
- Maa Bharati Award
