= 2008 Naina Devi temple stampede =

Stampede which took place in Himachal Pradesh

Coordinates: 31.359°N 76.488°E

Naina Devi stampede
- Date: 3 August 2008
- Time: 15:00 IST
- Location: Bilaspur, Himachal Pradesh India
- Deaths: 146
- Injuries: 150
- Stampede, crushed to death, asphyxiation

The 2008 Naina Devi temple stampede occurred on 3 August 2008 in the Indian state of Himachal Pradesh. 146 people died and 150 were injured when they were crushed, trampled, or forced over the side of a ravine by the movement of a large panicking crowd. Witness accounts suggest that events were initiated after a rain shelter collapsed, which worshipers mistakenly took to be a landslide. There were as many as 3000 devotees at the temple because it was a sacred place (called a "Shakti pitha") in the holy month of Shraavana of the Hindu Calendar. According to Daljit Singh Manhas, a senior police officer from the area, at least 40 of the victims were children.

The Chief Minister of Himachal Pradesh, Prem Kumar Dhumal, announced a government compensation of Rs. 100,000 (approximately US$2500) for those who died and Rs. 50,000 (approximately US$1250) for the seriously injured. 50,000 people had been expected to attend Naina Devi during the day of the stampede, as part of a nine-day festival which had just started. The pilgrimage resumed on the next day, 4 August 2008.

Gaurav Singh Saini, a 13-year-old boy from Tohana (a town located near Haryana-Punjab border) Haryana, saved 50-60 people during the stampede, and received the Bharat Award, the highest award at the 2009 National Bravery Awards.

== Stampede ==
Devotees standing in a queue initially saw the collapse of a rain shelter. This triggered a false cry of "landslide!" as it was raining on the day of the stampede. People reportedly tried to move outside the railings put up by the police for crowd control, but the police refused to allow any more movements. The railings later collapsed and people fell on each other, starting the stampede.

== Reaction ==
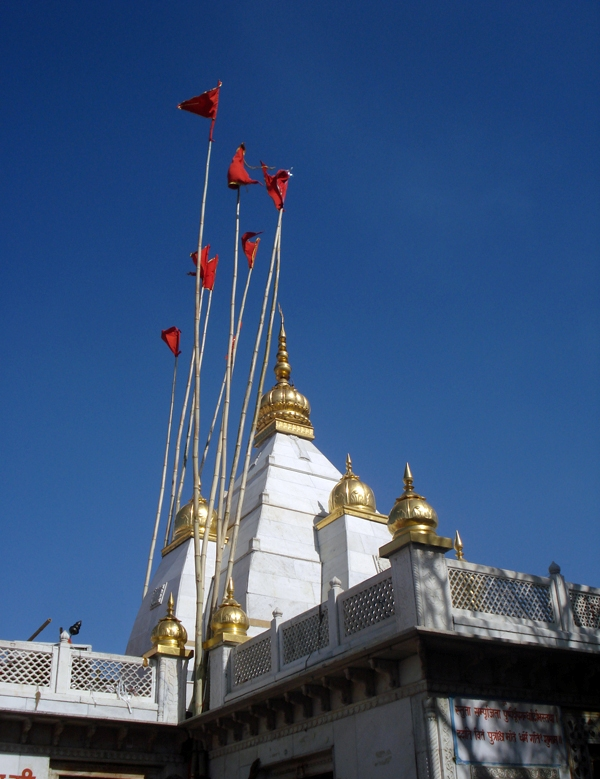
Naina Devi Temple

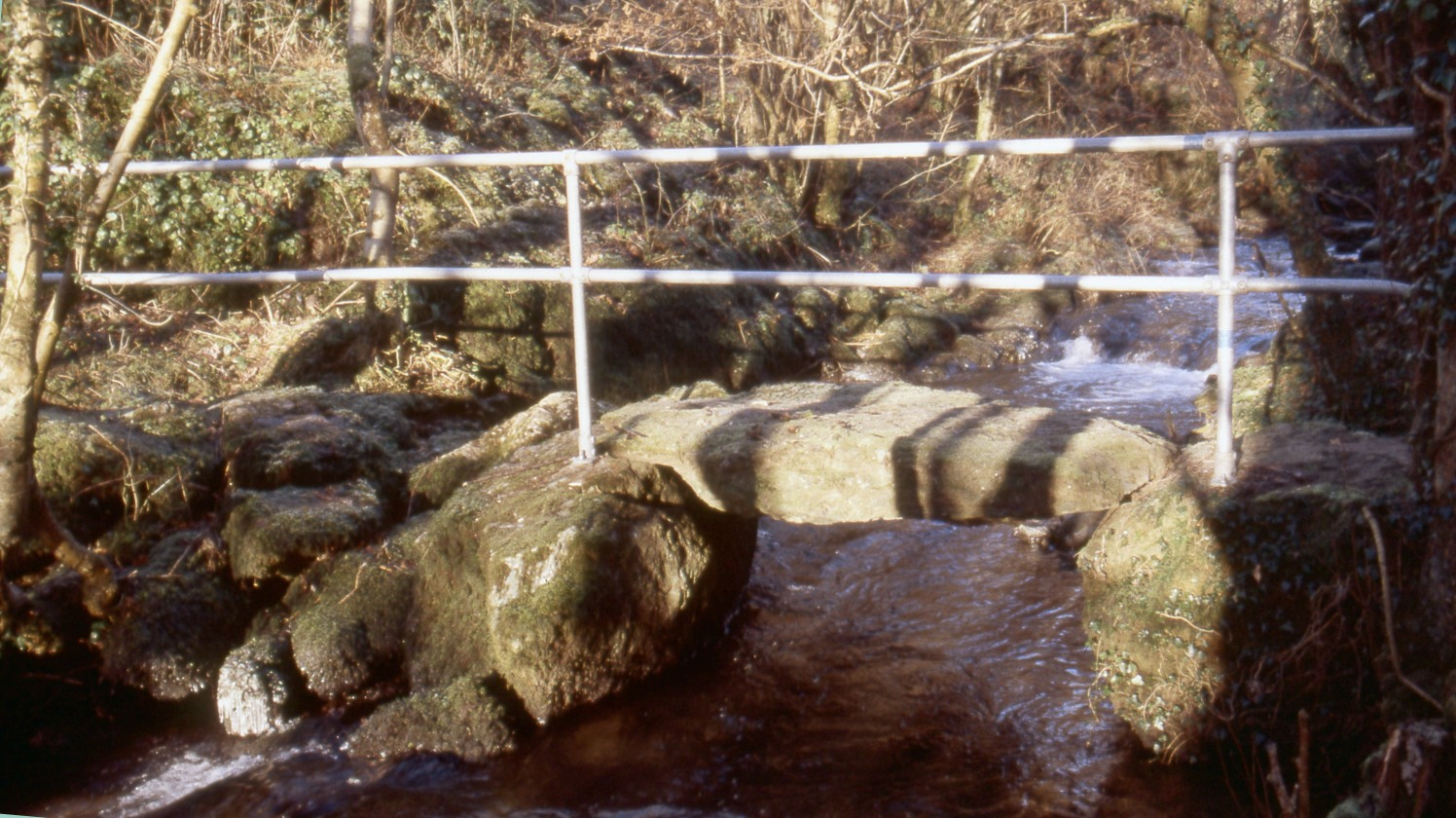
The Naina Devi guard rail was much like this one.

Rajnath Singh, the current leader of the Bharatiya Janata Party in India, responded to the stampede by releasing a statement in the hours after the disaster. "I am deeply saddened to learn about the tragic death of over 100 pilgrims. I convey my deep felt condolences to the family members of all those who have lost their lives or have been injured in the incident," he said.

Himachal Pradesh Chief Minister Prem Kumar Dhumal responded by announcing an inquiry into the incident.

The Vice President of India, Hamid Ansari, and the Speaker of Lok Sabha, Somnath Chatterjee, conveyed condolences to the families of those killed and injured in the incident.

The Tribune criticized the poor infrastructure and ill-maintained roads at the shrine, reporting that a team of doctors and paramedics were unable to reach the site of the accident until hours after the stampede. The Times of India observed that there had been no improvement in crowd management even though a similar stampede took place in the shrine in 1978 after rumors of a landslide spread, killing 65 people. As is often the case during disasters, the mobile telephone network around Naina Devi had insufficient capacity to serve the large number of phone calls by worried relatives.

== Post-mortem report of victims ==
Post-mortem examinations conducted on victims of the Naina Devi temple stampede confirmed that the deaths were caused by asphyxiation. Post-mortem reports of 101 bodies out of a total of 141 victims taken to the civil hospital at Anandpur Sahib in Punjab, 18 km from the site, have indicated compression of the chest causing asphyxiation and death, Sub-Divisional Magistrate (SDM) P C Akela said. Akela, who remained stationed at Anandpur Sahib after the incident, said post-mortems were not carried out on 40 of the dead at the request of their relatives.

== See also ==
- 2008 Jodhpur stampede
