= Kedar Nath Upadhyay =

Former Chief Justice of Nepal

Former Hon'ble Kedar Nath Upadhyay

14th in Chief Justice of Nepal
- In office 6 December 2002 – 21 January 2004
- Appointed by: Girija Prasad Koirala
- Preceded by: Keshav Prasad Upadhyaya
- Succeeded by: Govinda Bahadur Shrestha

Kedar Nath Upadhyay was a Nepalese judge who served as 14th Chief Justice of Nepal, in office from 6 December 2002 to 21 January 2004. He was appointed by the then-Prime Minister of Nepal, Girija Prasad Koirala.

Upadhyay was preceded by Keshav Prasad Upadhyaya and succeeded by Govinda Bahadur Shrestha.
