= Supriya Maskey =

Nepalese beauty queen (born 2000)

- Born: June 17, 2000 (age 26); Gorkha, Nepal
- Beauty pageant titleholder
- Title: Little Miss World Nepal 2012; Miss Teen World 2012
- Hair color: Dark Brown
- Eye color: Brown
- Major competitions: Little Miss World Nepal 2012; Little Miss World 2012

Supriya Maskey (born June 17, 2000, in Nepal) is a Nepalese beauty pageant titleholder. She was crowned as Little Miss World Nepal 2012 held at Tribhuvan Army Officers’ Club in Kathmandu on September 30, 2012. She represented her country at Little Miss World and was crowned as Little Miss Teen World 2012 held on 6 October 2012 in Antalya, Turkey.

== Teen Miss World 2012 ==
Maskey won the Teen Miss World 2012 pageant held in Antalya, Turkey, becoming the second Nepali contestant to win the title. Previously, Biphaswi Poudel had won the title of Little Miss World 2011. The 12th edition of Little Miss World beauty contest was held in Antalya, Turkey on October 10, 2012, where the Little Miss World 2012 title was awarded to Sofia Kutsenko from Ukraine.
