= Surendra Prasad Singh =

Former Chief Justice of Nepal

Former Hon'ble Surendra Prasad Singh
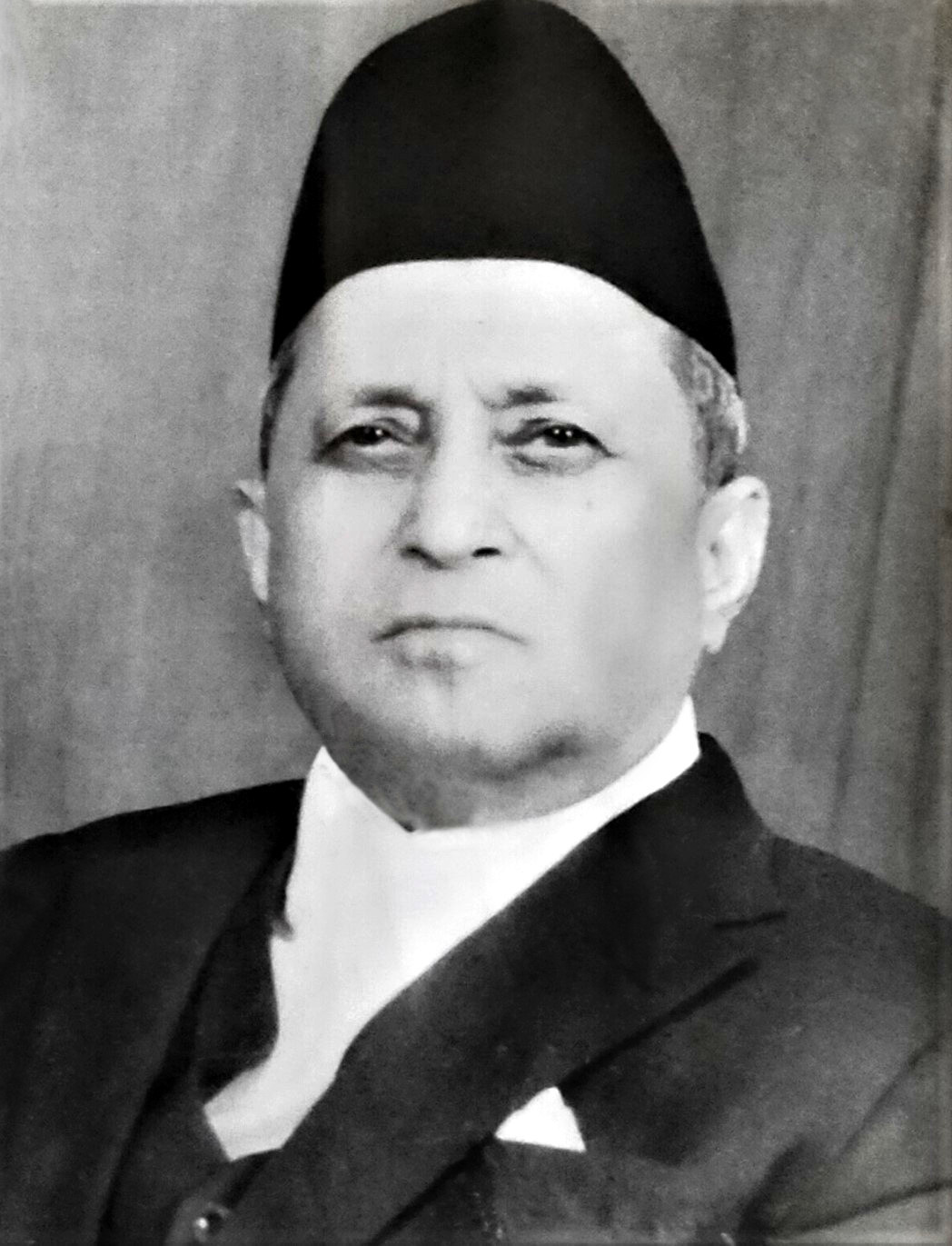

9th in Chief Justice of Nepal
- In office 26 September 1995 – 14 February 1997
- Appointed by: Birendra Bir Bikram Shah Dev
- Preceded by: Bishwonath Upadhyaya
- Succeeded by: Trilok Pratap Rana

Personal details
- Born: 14 February 1932
- Died: 2 March 2021 (aged 89)
- Education: Government Law College, Mumbai

Surendra Prasad Singh was a Nepalese judge who served as 9th Chief Justice of Nepal, in office from 26 September 1995 to 14 February 1997. He was appointed by the then-king of Nepal, Birendra.

Singh was preceded by Bishwonath Upadhyaya and succeeded by Trilok Pratap Rana.

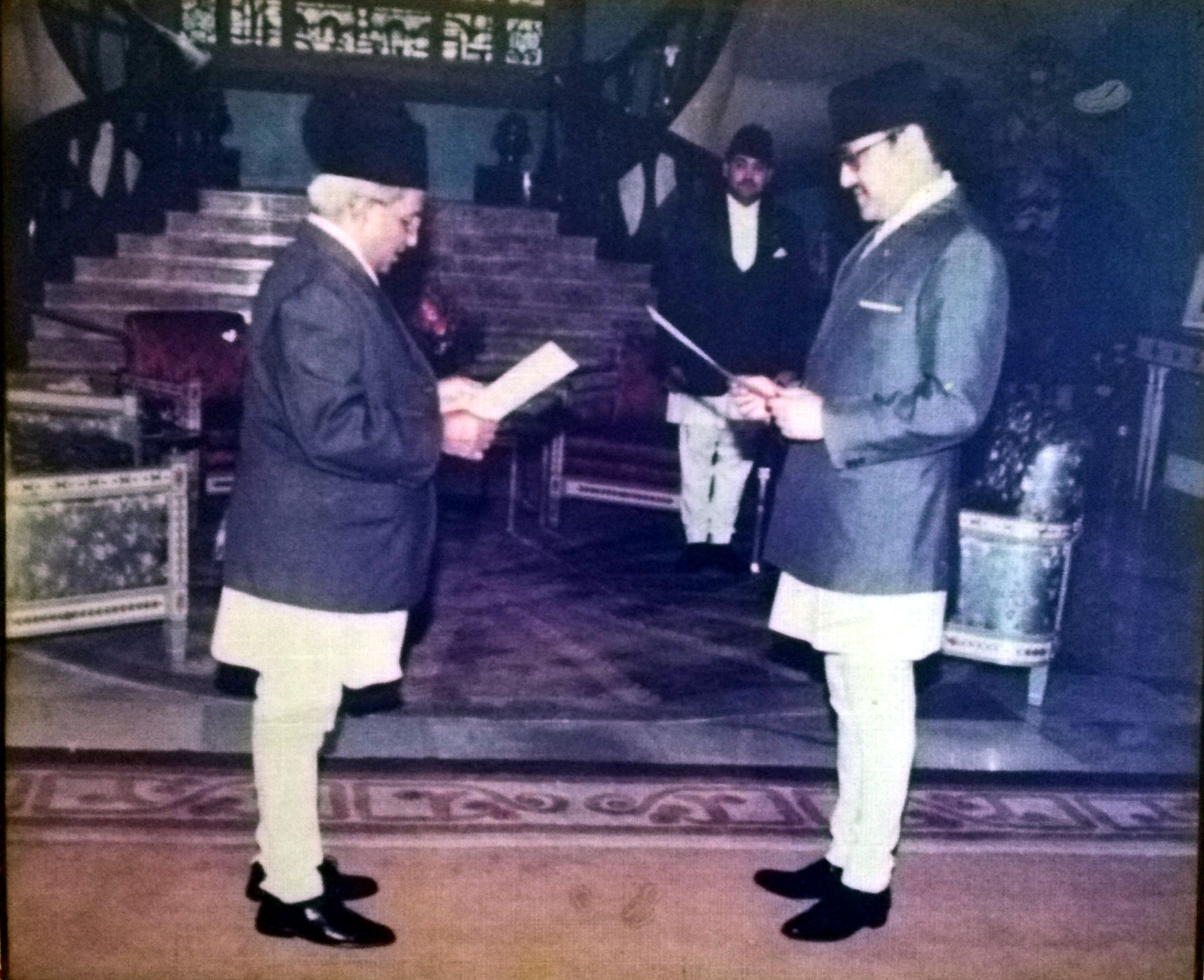
Taking Oath as the 9th Chief Justice of Nepal from the then King Birendra

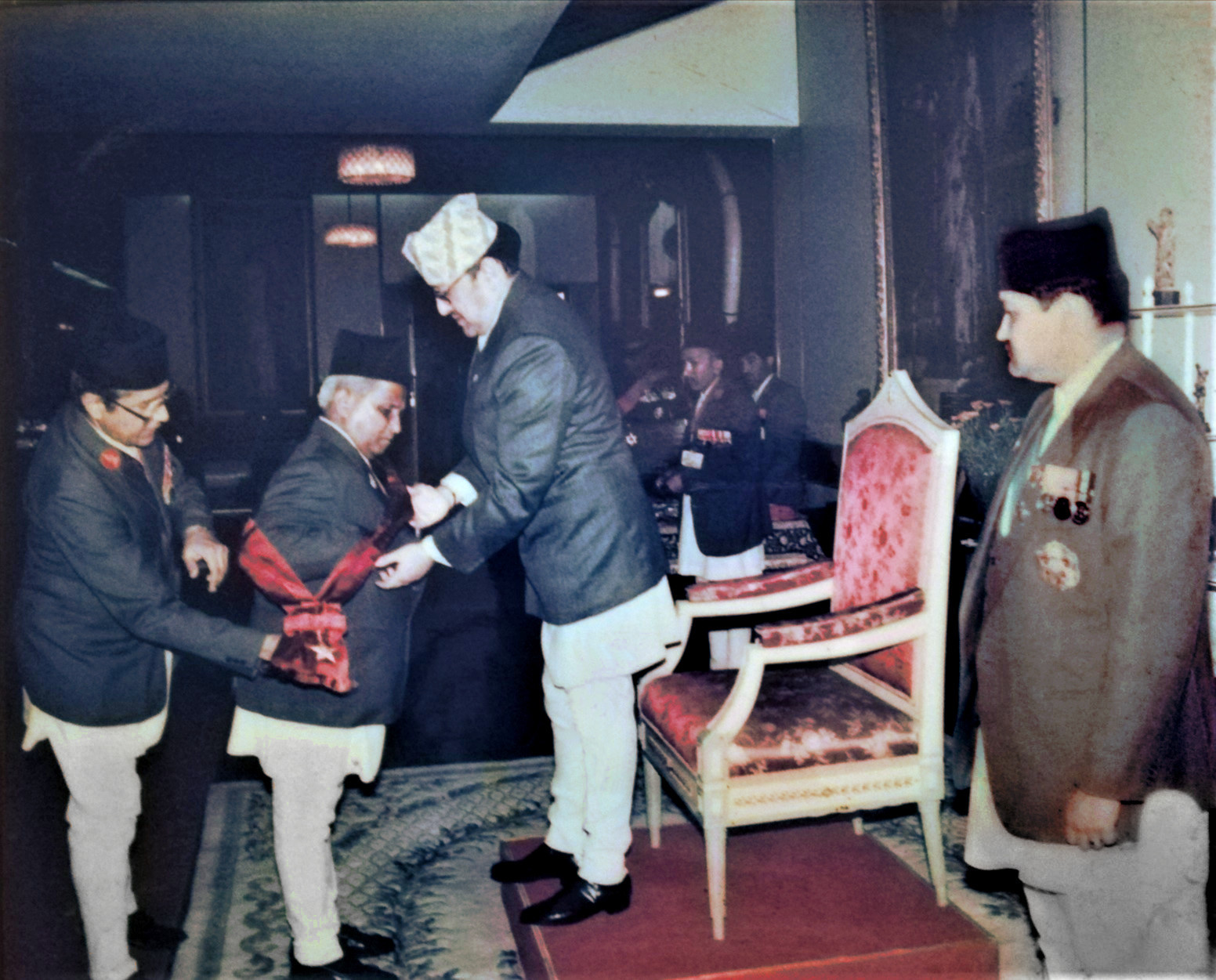
Receiving Gorakha Dakshin Baahu (First Order) from the then King Birendra
