= Trilok Pratap Rana =

Former Chief Justice of Nepal

Former Hon'ble Trilok Pratap Rana

10th in Chief Justice of Nepal
- In office 16 February 1997 – 17 September 1997
- Appointed by: Birendra Bir Bikram Shah Dev
- Preceded by: Surendra Prasad Singh
- Succeeded by: Om Bhakta Shrestha

Personal details
- Died: February 13, 2014 (aged 80–81)

Trilok Pratap Rana (1933-2014) was a Nepalese judge who served as 10th Chief Justice of Nepal, in office from 15 February 1997 to 17 September 1997. He was appointed by the then-king of Nepal, Birendra.

Rana was preceded by Surendra Prasad Singh and succeeded by Om Bhakta Shrestha. He was also a former president of SAARC Law Nepal.
