= Champions of Change =

Indian Award

- Country: India
- Presented by: Interactive Forum on Indian Economy (IFIE)

Champions of Change (COC) is an Indian award for promoting Indian values like community service, social development, healthcare, education and national unity, selected by constitutional jury members headed by K. G. Balakrishnan, the Former Chief Justice of India and Former Chairman NHRC and Justice Gyan Sudha Misra, Former Judge, Supreme Court of India. The awards are organised annually and usually presented by the President of India, Vice President of India, former President of India, former Vice president of India or any leading political figure of India.

Champions of Change Awards are organized by Interactive Forum on Indian Economy (IFIE), which is a Government of India recognized (80G, 12A, 8A compliant), not-for-profit company dedicated for the development and welfare of women and children of rural India. IFIE annually organizes Champions of Change Award at International, National and state-Level in India. Nandan Jha is the founder and organizer of champions of change awards and chairman of the 'Interactive Forum on Indian Economy'.

The award comprises a certificate and a gold medal. It is given in four categories, namely:

- Application of Education, Healthcare, Science and Technology for Rural development.
- Outstanding contribution for the Development and Welfare of Women and Children
- Outstanding contribution in Swatch Bharat Abhiyan

== Jury ==
The Jury for Champions of Change Award is headed by Justice K. G. Balakrishnan (Former Chief Justice of India & Former Chairman NHRC India) & Justice Gyan Sudha Misra (Former Supreme Court Judge of India). Jury members include Former Indian Administrative Service, Indian Foreign Service & Indian Revenue Service Officers along with veteran journalists and academics.

== History ==
=== 2018 Awardees ===
The first edition ceremony took place on 26 December’ 2018 at Vigyan Bhavan New Delhi with Vice President of India M. Venkaiah Naidu as the Chief Guest and notable awardees included:

- N. Biren Singh (Chief Minister of Manipur)
- Sadhvi Niranjan Jyoti (Union Minister Govt Of India)
- Jaswant SinghSumanbhai Bhabhor (Union Minister Govt Of India)
- Bidyut Baran Mahato (MP/LS, Jamshedpur, Jharkhand)
- Nishikant Dubey (MP/LS/Godda, Jharkhand)
- Ritu Jaiswal
- Gedela Srinubabu

=== 2019 Awardees ===
The second edition of COC happened at 10, Rajaji Marg (Residence of Former President of India, Late Pranab Mukherjee) & Vigyan Bhavan, New Delhi on 20 January’2020 with Former President of India Late Pranab Mukherjee as Chief Guest and notable awardees included:

- Hemant Soren (Chief minister of Jharkhand), Social Welfare
- Manish Sisodia (Dy Chief Minister of Delhi), (Education)
- Anurag Thakur (Mos Finance & Corporate Affairs), Social Welfare
- Acharya Balkrishna (Patanjali), Social Welfare
- Suresh Oberoi & (The Awakening of Brahma Kumaris),
- Geeta Koda (MP LS), Social Welfare
- Abhinav Singh (Co- Secretary of India at Gandhi Mandela Foundation (GMF) - Uttar Pradesh

=== 2020 Awardees ===
The third edition took place at Taj Resort & Convention Centre, Goa on 16 April’2021 with Governor of Maharashtra & Goa Bhagat Singh Koshyari as chief guest and list of awardees included:

- Pramod Sawant, Chief Minister of Goa
- Shripad Naik, Union Minister for Ayush Ministry & MoS Defense
- M. K. Stalin, President of DMK
- Hema Malini, MP & Veteran Indian Film Actress
- Pahlaj Nihalani, Former Chairman Censor Board & Veteran Film Producer
- Sonu Nigam (Renowned Playback Singer)
- Hema Sardesai (Renowned Playback Singer)
- Sushmita Sen (Former Miss Universe and Film Actor)
- Suresh Jain (Bharat Vikas Parishad, Social Service)
- Swami Chidanand Saraswati (Founder, Parmarth Niketan)
- Raj K. Purohit
- Vipul Goel
- Sabarna Roy Indian Author, Culture, West Bengal

=== 2021 Awardees ===
The fourth edition of COC happened at Vigyan Bhavan, New Delhi on 26 February 2023 with Former President of India Ramnath Kovind as Chief Guest and notable awardees included:

- Gajendra Singh Shekhawat, Minister for Jal Shakti, Govt. of India
- Dr. Lakshmi Sahgal (Posthumous), Padma Vibhushan & Revolutionary of India Independence Movement
- Ramdhari Singh Dinkar (Posthumous), Padma Bhushan, Indian National Poet
- Pt. Chhannulal Mishra, Padma Vibhushan & Indian Classical Singer
- Sub Maj Sanjay Kumar, Winner of Param Vir Chakra
- Nripendra Misra, Padma Bhushan & Former Principal Secretary to Hon’ble Prime Minister of India
- Abhinav Bindra, Olympic Gold Medalist & Indian Sports Shooter
- Juhi Chawla, Indian Film Actress
- R. Madhavan, Indian Film Actor
- Anuj Wahi, Vice-Chairman & Managing Director at KHC Healthcare India Private Limited

== State Awards ==
=== Maharashtra ===
Champions of Change Maharashtra Award is a state award for recognition and acknowledgement of the efforts of those who work to bring change in the society. First Edition of Champions of Change Maharashtra Award was organized on 30 September'2021 at Taj Mahal Palace, Mumbai with Governor of Maharashtra Bhagat Singh Koshyari as the Chief Guest. The notable awardees included Devendra Fadnavis, Dilip Walse-Patil, Nana Patole, Jackie Shroff, Dia Mirza, Nawazuddin Siddiqui, Himanshu Shah, Motilal Oswal, Sindhutai Sapkal, and Popatrao Pawar. The selection of awardees is done by Constitutional Jury headed by Former Supreme Court Judge of India.

=== Telangana ===
Champions of Change Telangana is a state award for recognition and acknowledgement of the efforts of those who work to bring change to the state of Telangana. First Edition of Champions of Change Telangana Award was organized on 25 February '2022 at Hyderabad, Telangana with Justice K G Balakrishnan (Former Chief Justice of India & Former Chairman NHRC India) as the Chief Guest. The notable awardees included Dr. D. Nageshwara Reddy, P V Sindhu, Rameswar Rao Jupally, Jayesh Ranjan, Anjani Kumar, Allu Arjun, Dr Sukanta Kumar Jena, and Samantha Ruth Prabhu.

=== Madhya Pradesh ===
Champions of Change Madhya Pradesh is a state award for recognition and acknowledgement of the efforts of those who work to bring change to the state of Madhya Pradesh. First Edition of Champions of Change Madhya Pradesh Award was organized on 12 April '2022 at Kushabhau Thakre Hall, Bhopal, Madhya Pradesh with Governor of Madhya Pradesh Mangubhai Patel as the Chief Guest. The notable awardees included Shivraj Singh Chouhan, Aziz Qureshi, Tijan Bai, Vikram Verma, Syed Zafar Islam, Malini Gaur, Dilip Suryavanshi, Girish Agarwal, Bhagirathi Prasad, Piyush Mishra, Banwari Lal Chouksey, Divyanka Tripathi and Arya Chhabra.

=== Haryana ===
Champions of Change Haryana is a state award for recognition and acknowledgement of the efforts of those who work to bring change to the state of Haryana. First Edition of Champions of Change Haryana was organized on 2 October '2022 at Chandigarh with Governor of Haryana Bandaru Dattatreya as the Chief Guest. The notable awardees included Manohar Lal Khattar, Kartikeya Sharma, Kanwal Singh Chauhan, Deepa Malik, Babita Phogat, Nitu Ghanghas, Yashpal Sharma, Richa Sharma, Sumit Antil, Neeraj Chopra, Murti Devi and Virendra Sehwag.

=== Karnataka ===
Champions of Change Karnataka Award is a state award for recognition and acknowledgement towards the efforts of those who work to bring change in the state of Karnataka. First Edition of Champions of Change Karnataka Award was organized on 7 November 2023 at Bangalore with Thawar Chand Gehlot (Governor of Karnataka) as the Chief Guest. The notable awardees included Bharat Ratna C N R Rao, Padma Vibhushan S M Krishna, Padma Vibhushan Veerendra Heggade, Padma Shri Tulsi Gowda, Manjamma Jogathi, Upendra, Tejasvi Surya, Venkatesh Prasad, Somdutta Singh,Vishnuvardhan, upendra V Ravichandran, Rajeshwari Gayakwad among others.
