= Jeevan Raksha Padak =

- Ribbon of the medal
- Type: Lifesaving award
- Description: ₹1,00,000 cash award lump-sum monetary allowance
- Country: India
- Presented by: Government of India
- Ribbon: Red with blue edges and three thin central green stripes
- Obverse: Open hand
- Reverse: Emblem of India
- Established: 30 September 1961

Precedence
- Next (higher): Long Service and Good Conduct Medal
- Next (lower): Territorial Army Decoration

The Jeevan Raksha Padak (Life Saving Medal) is a civilian lifesaving award presented by the Government of India. Established on 30 September 1961, the award was originally called the Jeevan Raksha Padak, Class III.

== Criteria ==
The Jeevan Raksha Padak is awarded to civilians to reward saving lives from drowning, fire, or mine accidents. It is awarded for "courage and promptitude in saving life under circumstances of grave bodily injury to the rescuer".

The Jeevan Raksha Padak may be awarded to members of the armed forces, police, or fire services when recognizable acts take place outside beyond the course of their duty. Subsequent awards are recognized by the addition of a medal bar to the ribbon. The medal may be awarded posthumously.
