= Pratima Sherpa =

Nepalese golfer

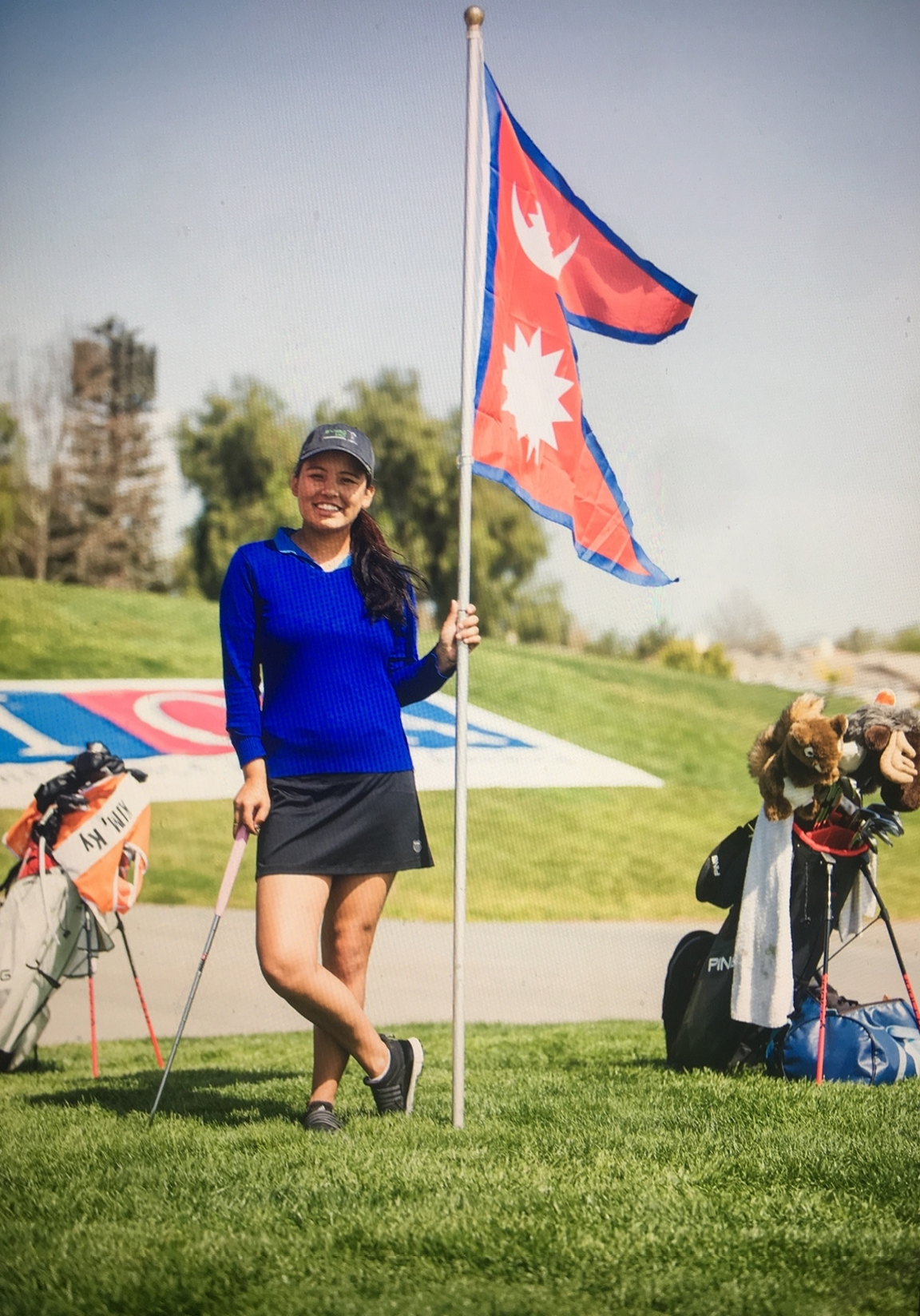
- Sherpa in 2019 with the flag of Nepal

Personal information
- Nationality: Nepal
- Born: 27 November 1999 (age 26) Kathmandu, Nepal

Career
- Sport: Golf
- College: Santa Barbara City College; California State University, Los Angeles
- Status: Amateur

Pratima Sherpa (Nepali: प्रतिमा शेर्पा; born 27 November 1999) is the first ranked amateur female golfer from Nepal. She was born and raised in a maintenance shed behind the third hole of the Royal Nepal Golf Club in Kathmandu. Her parents still live on the grounds of the golf course, where her father Pasang Sherpa works as a security guard and mother Kalpana Sherpa works as a maintenance worker.

Sherpa entered her first tournament at age 11 and won 33 trophies over the next six years. After being profiled by the Nepali Times in 2016, she attracted international attention and was invited to meet Tiger Woods. In 2018, ESPN produced a 25 minute long episode all about her journey to becoming the first female Nepalese golfer. She subsequently moved to California to train and attend Santa Barbara City College, where she was named Women's Golfer of the Year in 2020.

Sherpa entered her first LPGA-sanctioned tournament by entering the IOA Championship in the Symetra Tour.

Sherpa earned a scholarship from and transferred to California State University, Los Angeles. Sherpa graduated from the university in 2023.

Forbes magazine included her in the 2020 edition of the '30 under 30' list of Asian personalities in entertainment and sports.

== Additional References ==
SC Featured: A mountain to climb (Video). 20 April 2018.
