= Mohan Prasad Sharma =

Former Chief Justice of Nepal (1934–2022)

Former Hon'ble Mohan Prasad Sharma

12th in Chief Justice of Nepal
- In office 13 April 1998 – 15 December 1999
- Appointed by: Birendra Bir Bikram Shah Dev
- Preceded by: Om Bhakta Shrestha
- Succeeded by: Keshav Prasad Upadhyaya

Personal details
- Born: 16 December 1934 Kathmandu, Nepal
- Died: 19 January 2022 (aged 87) Kathmandu, Nepal

Mohan Prasad Sharma (16 December 1934 – 19 January 2022) was a Nepalese judge who served as 12th Chief Justice of Nepal, in office from 13 April 1998 to 15 December 1999. He was appointed by the then-king of Nepal, Birendra. Sharma was preceded by Om Bhakta Shrestha and succeeded by Keshav Prasad Upadhyaya. He died on 19 January 2022, at the age of 87.
