= Om Bhakta Shrestha =

Former Chief Justice of Nepal (1933–2020)

Former Hon'ble Om Bhakta Shrestha

11th in Chief Justice of Nepal
- In office 22 September 1997 – 12 April 1998
- Appointed by: Birendra Bir Bikram Shah Dev
- Preceded by: Trilok Pratap Rana
- Succeeded by: Mohan Prasad Sharma

Personal details
- Born: 12 April 1933 Dhankuta, Nepal
- Died: 18 March 2020 (aged 86) Kathmandu, Nepal

Om Bhakta Shrestha (12 April 1933 – 18 March 2020) was a Nepalese judge who served as 11th Chief Justice of Nepal, in office from 12 September 1997 to 12 April 1998. He was appointed by the then-king of Nepal, Birendra.

Shrestha was preceded by Trilok Pratap Rana and succeeded by Mohan Prasad Sharma.
