= Keshav Prasad Upadhyaya =

Former Chief Justice of Nepal

Former Hon'ble Keshav Prasad Upadhyaya

13th in Chief Justice of Nepal
- In office 16 December 1999 – 5 December 2002
- Appointed by: Birendra Bir Bikram Shah Dev
- Preceded by: Mohan Prasad Sharma
- Succeeded by: Kedar Nath Upadhyay

Keshav Prasad Upadhyaya was a Nepalese judge who served as 13th Chief Justice of Nepal, in office from 16 December 1999 to 5 December 2002. He was appointed by the then-king of Nepal, Birendra.

Upadhyaya was preceded by Mohan Prasad Sharma and succeeded by Kedar Nath Upadhyay.
