= List of recognized higher education accreditation organizations =

This is a list of recognized higher education related accreditation organizations. The list includes agencies and organizations that play a role in higher education accreditation and are recognized by applicable governmental authorities.

== International ==
The International Network for Quality Assurance Agencies in Higher Education (INQAAHE) is a global association of both governmental and non-governmental quality assurance organizations. Its membership list is available online.

The Council for Higher Education Accreditation (CHEA) maintains an international directory of education ministries, as well as assurance and accreditation bodies which have been authorized by their respective governments.

== Europe ==
The European Association for Quality Assurance in Higher Education (ENQA) is responsible for disseminating information, experiences and good practices in higher education quality assurance to quality assurance agencies, public authorities and higher education institutions in the European Higher Education Area (EHEA).

The European Quality Assurance Register for Higher Education (EQAR) is the EHEA's register of quality assurance agencies that comply with the European Standards and Guidelines for Quality Assurance.

The European Network of National Information Centres on academic recognition and mobility (ENIC network) provides information on recognition of foreign qualifications and education systems, opportunities for studying abroad (including information on loans and scholarships), as well as advice on practical questions related to mobility and equivalence.

The National Academic Recognition Information Centre (NARIC) network aims at improving academic recognition of diplomas and periods of study in the EU, the European Economic Area countries, and Turkey. The network is part of the Lifelong Learning Programme (LLP), which stimulates the mobility of students and staff between higher education institutions in these countries. Most NARICs do not take a decision, and instead offer information and advice on foreign education systems and qualifications.

ENIC – NARIC comprises all of Europe, as well as Australia, Canada, Israel, the United States of America and New Zealand, and provides information on the higher education systems and accreditation agencies of the member countries.

=== Czech Republic ===
There are public, state and private universities and colleges in the Czech Republic.

Public universities and colleges are established by an act of parliament, and their list is maintained by the Ministry of Education, Youth and Sports. There are two state universities, the University of Defence in Brno and the Police Academy of the Czech Republic in Prague.

Private universities and colleges are established by the private sector. Each of the universities and colleges can only provide higher education on the basis of accreditation issued by the National Accreditation Bureau for Higher Education. There are professional education programs standing outside the higher education system, which are not considered as higher education programs. The providing schools and institutions can be umbrellaed by some private organizations, such as the Czech Association of MBA Schools. The Accreditation, Certification and Member Association of education organization and schools z.s. supervises the quality and regularity of educational institutions.

=== Finland ===
Universities can only be founded or accredited by an Act of Parliament. Vocational universities are accredited by the Government of Finland, and governed through the Ministry of Education.

=== Germany ===
The Standing Conference of the Ministers of Education and Cultural Affairs ensures quality development and continuity in tertiary education. Bachelor and Master programs must be accredited by the Standing Conference.

The German Council of Science and Humanities conducts institutional accreditation of private and religious universities since 2001.

The Foundation for the Accreditation of Study Programs certifies accreditation agencies and establishes guidelines and criteria for program and system accreditation. There are currently ten certified agencies:

- AHPGS – Accreditation Agency for Study Programs in Special Education, Care, Health Sciences and Social Work
- AKAST – Agency for Quality Assurance and Accreditation of Canonical Study Programs
- ACQUIN – Accreditation, Certification and Quality Assurance Institute
- AQAS – Agency for Quality Assurance by Accreditation of Study Programs
- AQ Austria – Agency for Quality Assurance and Accreditation Austria
- ASIIN – Accreditation Agency for Degree Programs in Engineering, Informatics/Computer Science, the Natural Sciences and Mathematics
- evalag – Evaluation Agency Baden-Württemberg
- FIBAA – Foundation for International Business Administration Accreditation
- OAQ – Swiss Center of Accreditation and Quality Assurance in Higher Education
- ZEvA – Central Evaluation- and Accreditation Agency

These agencies accredit programs of study for Bachelor's and Master's degrees and quality management systems (system accreditation) from state or state recognized higher education institutions in Germany and abroad.

=== Ireland ===
Quality and Qualifications Ireland was established in 2012 as the single agency responsible for external quality assurance of higher education institutions in Ireland, replacing earlier agencies responsible for different sectors of higher education. It is responsible for the quality assurance of education and research within HEIs. Higher education institutions have been subject to statutory quality assurance since the 1990s and the country has been an active participant in the development of the European model of quality assurance.

=== Italy ===
The Italian state controls which institutions can call themselves a University. The Minister of University and Investigation supervises universities.

The system involves two separate but correlated programs:

1. Firstly, each university undergoes a four-step process to adopt and approve its own University Academic Regulations. These establish the rules for the organization of teaching at the university, including the requirements and objectives of each degree program, the curricula, credits awarded, and requirements and objectives of examinations. They were developed in consultation with representatives of the individual university, the regional coordinating committee, employers and the National University Council, and are ultimately approved by the (Ministry of Education).
2. Secondly, a series of formal objective standards is adopted as minimum requirements for approval of any programs.

=== Spain ===
The National Agency for Quality Assessment and Accreditation is the authorized national body responsible for the quality of the Spanish high education system. It was created as a foundation by the Cabinet of Spain under the Organic Law of Universities. Different regional agencies assume the accreditation (and quality levels) of university programs in their respective regions:

- ACPUA, in Aragon
- ACSUCYL, in Castile and Leon
- ACSUG, in Galicia
- AQU, in Catalonia
- AVAP, in Valencian Community
- DEVA-AAC, in Andalusia
- FCM Madrimasd, in Community of Madrid
- Unibasq, in Basque Country
- ACCUEE, in Canary Islands

=== United Kingdom ===
Under the Education Reform Act 1988, it is illegal to offer a degree or qualification that implies it is a degree without being authorized by a royal charter or by or under an act of parliament, unless the institution is acting on behalf of an authorized institution or the award has been specifically designated by order of the Secretary of State.

The government maintains lists of recognized bodies that have the right to grant UK degrees, as well as one of listed bodies that offer courses validated by a recognized body and leading to degrees of that body. Degree-offering institutions are subject to the Quality Assurance Agency (QAA). The QAA is a member of INQAAHE and ENQA. The Higher Education Degree Datacheck is the official service for authenticating universities and validating British degrees.

Professional degrees may be accredited by professional, statutory and regulatory bodies to ensure they meet the educational standards for professional licensure. A list of accrediting bodies recognized by the government is maintained by the Higher Education Statistics Agency.

For non-degree qualifications, including courses at the higher education level, there are four public accrediting bodies for the four countries of the United Kingdom. These are:

- Ofqual in England
- Qualifications Wales
- The Council for the Curriculum, Examinations & Assessment in Northern Ireland
- The Scottish Qualifications Authority

All qualifications accredited by these bodies will have a level and credit value on the Regulated Qualifications Framework (England and Northern Ireland), the Credit and Qualifications Framework for Wales, or the Scottish Credit and Qualifications Framework. Bodies with accredited qualifications, such as City & Guilds, may accredit education providers to deliver courses leading to these qualifications.

There are three bodies offering institutional accreditation for private colleges that are recognized by the UK government for visa purposes:

- The Accreditation Service for International Colleges (ASIC) for independent colleges in UK and colleges and universities worldwide. ASIC is an affiliate of ENQA.
- The British Accreditation Council (BAC) for independent higher education and further education institutions across the UK. BAC is also a member of INQAAHE and ENQA.
- Accreditation UK, part of the British Council (a non-departmental public body sponsored by the Foreign and Commonwealth Office), for English language schools only

The Open and Distance Learning Quality Council (formerly the Council for the Accreditation of Correspondence Colleges) is an independent body that accredits home study, distance learning and online learning providers.

== Central African Republic ==
The National Agency for Quality Assurance and Accreditation of Higher Education operates under the Ministry of Higher Education, Scientific Research, and Technological Innovation of the Central African Republic. The National Agency is responsible for ensuring quality standards, accreditation and regulatory compliance across higher education institutions in the country. They develop policies, evaluate institutions and encourage practices to align the Central African Republic's higher education system with international accreditation standards.

They have also established a partnership with the International Commission for Accreditation and Quality Assurance in Higher Education (ICAQAHE). This collaboration aims to enhance higher education quality, international recognition and academic mobility through standardized accreditation processes.

== Ghana ==
The Independent Security Council, Ghana Medical Association, Pharmacy Council, and General Legal Council are some of the recognized professional bodies in Ghana. The Ghana Medical Association and General Legal Council represent the government of Ghana, and the Independent Security Council is the official non-governmental body providing security training and award and accredit security programs. Unlike the Ghana Medical Association and General Legal Council, the Independent Security Council partners with universities with security-focused departments with the aim of offering courses to local residents.

Other government recognized professional bodies, such as the Council for Technical and Vocational Education and Training, the Engineering Council of Ghana, the National Board for Professional and Technician Examination, and the National Council for Tertiary Education are mandated with level of regulatory status in specific fields of respective practices.

== Hong Kong ==
In Hong Kong, the Hong Kong Council for Accreditation of Academic and Vocational Qualifications (HKCAAVQ) conducts accreditation, replacing the former Hong Kong Council for Academic Accreditation. The council maintains a list of accredited programs, and these programs may also be entered into Hong Kong's Qualifications Register.

- The Law Society of Hong Kong
- Hong Kong Bar Association
- The Medical Council of Hong Kong
- Hong Kong Council for Accreditation of Academic and Vocational Qualifications

== India ==
Universities in India are created constitutionally through government action, and those that are not properly established are considered "fake universities" and lack authority to grant degrees.

Accreditation is under the authority of a set of professional councils established by statute and other bodies established or recognized by the University Grants Commission:

- National Board of Accreditation (NBA)
- Quality Council of India (QCI)
- Distance Education Council (DEC)
- National Council for Teacher Education (NCTE)
- Indian Council of Agricultural Research (ICAR)
- Bar Council of India (BCI)
- Scientific Institute and Research Organizations (SIROs)
- National Council for Teacher Education (NCTE)
- Rehabilitation Council of India (RCI)
- Medical Council of India (MCI)
- Pharmacy Council Of India (PCI)
- Indian Nursing Council (INC)
- Aiipphs State Government University Delhi (ADU)
- National Council for Indian Education (NCIE)
- Dental Council of India (DCI)
- Central Council of Homoeopathy (CCH)
- Central Council of Indian Medicine (CCIM)
- National Assessment and Accreditation Council (NAAC)
- Ministry of Human Resource Development (MHRD)
- Association of Indian Universities (AIU)
- Indian Maritime University(IMU)
- Indira Gandhi National Open University (IGNOU)

== Indonesia ==
In Indonesia, accreditation criteria is based on the National Higher Education Standards. Higher education accreditation is carried out by the National Accreditation Board for Higher Education, and accreditation for study programs is carried out by the Independent Accreditation Institute. However, when a specific discipline lacks an independent accreditation agency, program accreditation are carried out by the National Accreditation Board.

Independent Accreditation Boards include:

- Sains Alam dan Ilmu Formal (LAMSAMA) concerning Natural and Formal Sciences
- Pendidikan Tinggi Kesehatan (LAM PT-Kes) concerning Health education
- Teknik concerning Engineering education
- Kependidikan concerning Teacher education
- Ekonomi, Manajemen, Bisnis, dan Akuntansi (LAM EMBA) concerning Economics, Management, Business, and Accounting education
- Informatika dan Komputer (LAM INFOKOM) concerning Informatics and Computing education

The Indonesian Accreditation Board for Engineering grants international accreditation for engineering, and informatics and computing education.

== Malaysia ==
The Malaysian Qualifications Agency (MQA) is a statutory body which accredits post secondary or higher education academic programs, as well as facilitates the accreditation and articulation of qualifications. There are also some other recognized organizations who regulate their specific technical fields:

- Board of Engineers Malaysia (BEM)
- Malaysian Medical Council (MMC)
- Malaysian Dental Council (MDC)
- Pharmacy Board Malaysia
- Malaysian Chinese Medical Associations (MCMA)
- Federation of Chinese Physicians and Acupuncturists Associations Malaysia (FCPAAM)
- Malaysia Nursing Board
- Malaysian Veterinary Council (MVC)
- Malaysian Homeopathic Medical Council (MPHM)
- Board of Architects Malaysia (LAM)
- Board of Quantity Surveyors Malaysia (BQSM)
- Malaysian Bar Council
- Malaysian Institute of Accountants (MIA)
- Chartered Tax Institute of Malaysia (CTIM)
- Financial Planning Association of Malaysia (FPAM)
- Asian Institute of Chartered Bankers (AICB)
- Malaysian Association of Company Secretaries (MACS)
- The Malaysian Institute of Chartered Secretaries and Administrators (MAICSA)
- Board of Valuers, Appraisers & Real Estate Agents Malaysia (LPPEH)
- The Society of Logisticians, Malaysia

== Nepal ==
Universities in Nepal are established through government action. Universities, technical institutes and certified higher education institutions are recognized by the University Grant Commission. The Council for Technical Education and Vocational Training is the national autonomous apex body of Technical and Vocational Education and Training regulation. There are also some other recognized organizations who regulate their specific technical fields:

- Nepal Engineering Council
- Nepal Nursing Council
- Nepal Medical Council
- Nepal Pharmacy Council
- Nepal Bar Council
- Nepal Ayurvedic Medical Council
- Nepal Veterinary Council
- Nepal Open University

== New Zealand ==
The New Zealand Qualifications Authority (NZQA).

== Nicaragua ==
Both public and private universities in Nicaragua must be established with evaluation and authorization by the National Council of Universities (CNU), and then founded by an Act of Parliament. Recognized universities do not require individual program accreditations. The National Council of Evaluation and Accreditation (CNEA) is the quality assurance agency. All recognized universities must participate in the quality assurance program including mandatory auto-evaluation and reporting to the CNEA, and may pursue deliberate institutional accreditation by the CNEA or an accreditation agency recognized by them. CNEA accreditation only applies to already recognized universities and does not substitute the required CNU authorization.

== Brazil ==
In Brazil, private higher education accreditation began with the foundation of the MACCA – Agência de Acreditação do Mercosul. MACCA is a private institutional and programmatic accreditation agency that operates in alliance with the ABED – Associação Brasileira de Ensino a Distância, an organization that is a member of the Fórum Nacional de Educação of the Ministry of Education. The agency is a pioneer in quality assurance (QA)-based accreditation and includes in its structure consultants and inspectors from several countries, as well as a parliamentary letter of recommendation issued by a federal deputy.

Although MACCA is a private agency, it has established alliances and recognition agreements with public (state-authorized) accreditation bodies, such as the ANACEC (Moldova), IARC/NIARS (Kyrgyzstan), CACEB (Mexico), Public Foundation Independent Accreditation Agency “BILIM-STANDART” (Kyrgyzstan), and Edu Int. (Palau). Through these partnerships, colleges and universities accredited by MACCA can obtain dual accreditation with state authority, either institutional or programmatic.

== Pakistan ==
In 2003, Canada began helping Pakistan develop an accreditation system. The Higher Education Commission (HEC) may set up national or regional evaluation councils, or authorize any existing council or similar body to carry out accreditation of institutions by giving them appropriate ratings. This also includes their departments, facilities and disciplines

- Established under Quality Assurance Agency of HEC
  - National Accreditation Council for Teachers Education (NACTE)
  - National Agricultural Education Accreditation Council (NAEAC)
  - National Business Education Accreditation Council (NBEAC)
  - National Computing Education Accreditation Council (NCEAC)
  - National Technology Council (Pakistan)
- HEC independent professional bodies
  - Pakistan Bar Council (PBC)
  - Pakistan Council for Architects and Town Planners (PCATP)
  - Pharmacy Council of Pakistan (PCP)
  - Pakistan Engineering Council (PEC)
  - Pakistan Medical and Dental Council (PMDC)
  - Pakistan Nursing Council (PNC)
  - Pakistan Veterinary Medical Council (PVMC)
  - National Council for Homeopathy (NCH)
  - National Council for Tibb (NCT)

== United Arab Emirates ==
- Commission for Academic Accreditation (CAA)

== United States ==
=== Institutional accreditation ===
Institutional accreditation applies to the entire institution, specific programs, and distance education within an institution. The U.S. Department of Education recognizes the following organizations as institutional accreditors:

- Academy of Nutrition and Dietetics, Accreditation Council for Education in Nutrition and Dietetics
- Accrediting Bureau of Health Education Schools
- Accreditation Commission for Acupuncture and Herbal Medicine
- Accreditation Commission for Education in Nursing
- Accrediting Commission of Career Schools and Colleges
- Accrediting Council for Continuing Education and Training
- American Bar Association
- American Board of Funeral Service Education
- American Osteopathic Association
- American Podiatric Medical Association
- Association for Biblical Higher Education
- Association of Advanced Rabbinical and Talmudic Schools
- Association of Institutions of Jewish Studies
- Association of Reformed Theological Seminaries (CHEA-recognized, not USDE-recognized)
- Association of Theological Schools
- Commission on English Language Program Accreditation
- Commission on Massage Therapy Accreditation
- Council on Accreditation of Nurse Anesthesia Educational Programs
- Council on Chiropractic Education
- Council on Occupational Education
- Distance Education Accrediting Commission
- Higher Learning Commission
- Joint Review Committee on Education in Radiologic Technology
- Middle States Commission on Higher Education
- Middle States Commission on Secondary Schools
- Midwifery Education Accreditation Council
- Montessori Accreditation Council for Teacher Education
- National Accrediting Commission of Career Arts and Sciences
- National Association of Schools of Art and Design
- National Association of Schools of Dance
- National Association of Schools of Music
- National Association of Schools of Theatre
- New England Commission of Higher Education
- New York State Board of Regents, and the Commissioner of Education
- Northwest Commission on Colleges and Universities
- Southern Association of Colleges and Schools
- Transnational Association of Christian Colleges and Schools
- WASC Accrediting Commission for Community and Junior Colleges
- WASC Senior College and University Commission (WSCUC)

=== Program accreditation ===
These accreditors typically cover a specific program of professional education or training, but in some cases they cover the whole institution. Both the US Department of Education and CHEA maintain lists of recognized US programmatic accreditors:

- Accreditation Commission for Acupuncture and Herbal Medicine (ACAHM) (Not CHEA-recognized, USDE-recognized)
- Accreditation Commission for Audiology Education (ACAE) (CHEA-recognized, not USDE-recognized)
- Accreditation Commission for Education in Nursing (ACEN) (CHEA-recognized, USDE-recognized)
- Accreditation Commission for Midwifery Education (ACME) (Not CHEA-recognized, USDE-recognized although not eligible for Title IV funding)
- Accreditation Council for Business Schools and Programs (ACBSP) (CHEA-recognized, not USDE-recognized)
- Accreditation Council for Education in Nutrition and Dietetics, Academy of Nutrition and Dietetics (ACEND) (Not CHEA-recognized, USDE-recognized)
- Accreditation Council for Pharmacy Education (ACPE) (CHEA-recognized, USDE-recognized although not eligible for Title IV funding)
- Accreditation Council on Optometric Education (ACOE) (CHEA-recognized, USDE-recognized although not eligible for Title IV funding)
- Accreditation Review Commission on Education for the Physician Assistant (ARC-PA) (CHEA-recognized, not USDE-recognized)
- Accrediting Bureau of Health Education Schools (ABHES) (Not CHEA-recognized, USDE-recognized)
- Accrediting Council on Education in Journalism and Mass Communications (ACEJMC) (CHEA-recognized, not USDE-recognized)
- American Academy of Forensic Sciences Forensic Science Education Programs Accreditation Commission (AAFS-FEPAC) (CHEA-recognized, not USDE-recognized)
- American Association of Family and Consumer Sciences, Council for Accreditation (AAFCS-CFA) (CHEA-recognized, not USDE-recognized)
- American Board of Funeral Service Education, Committee on Accreditation (ABFSE) (CHEA-recognized, USDE-recognized)
- American Council for Construction Education (ACCE) (CHEA-recognized, not USDE-recognized)
- American Culinary Federation Education Foundation, Accrediting Commission (ACFEF-AC) (CHEA-recognized, not USDE-recognized)
- American Library Association, Committee on Accreditation (ALA-CoA) (CHEA-recognized, not USDE-recognized)
- American Occupational Therapy Association, Accreditation Council for Occupational Therapy Education (AOTA-ACOTE) (CHEA-recognized, USDE-recognized although not eligible for Title IV funding)
- American Osteopathic Association, Commission on Osteopathic College Accreditation (AOA-COCA) (Not CHEA-recognized, USDE-recognized)
- American Physical Therapy Association, Commission on Accreditation in Physical Therapy Education (APTA-CAPTE) (CHEA-recognized, USDE-recognized although not eligible for Title IV funding)
- American Podiatric Medical Association, Council on Podiatric Medical Education (APMA-CPME) (CHEA-recognized, USDE-recognized)
- American Psychological Association, Commission on Accreditation (APA-CoA) (CHEA-recognized, USDE-recognized although not eligible for Title IV funding)
- American Veterinary Medical Association, Council on Education (AVMA-COE) (CHEA-recognized, USDE-recognized although not eligible for Title IV funding)
- Association for Advancing Quality in Educator Preparation (AAQEP) (CHEA-recognized, not USDE-recognized)
- Association for Behavior Analysis International Accreditation Board (ABAI) (CHEA-recognized, not USDE-recognized)
- Association for Biblical Higher Education Commission on Accreditation (ABHE) (CHEA-recognized, USDE-recognized)
- Association for Clinical Pastoral Education, Accreditation Commission (ACPE Inc) (Not CHEA-recognized, USDE-recognized although not eligible for Title IV funding)
- Association of Technology, Management, and Applied Engineering (ATMAE) (CHEA-recognized, not USDE-recognized)
- Aviation Accreditation Board International (AABI) (CHEA-recognized, not USDE-recognized)
- Commission on Accreditation for Health Informatics and Information Management Education (CAHIIM) (CHEA-recognized, not USDE-recognized)
- Commission on Accreditation for Marriage and Family Therapy Education, American Association for Marriage and Family Therapy (COAMFTE-AAMFT) (CHEA-recognized, not USDE-recognized)
- Commission on Accreditation for Respiratory Care (CoARC) (CHEA-recognized, not USDE-recognized)
- Commission on Accreditation of Allied Health Education Programs (CAAHEP) (CHEA-recognized, not USDE-recognized)
- Commission on Accreditation of Athletic Training Education (CAATE) (CHEA-recognized, not USDE-recognized)
- Commission on Accreditation of Healthcare Management Education (CAHME) (CHEA-recognized, not USDE-recognized)
- Commission on Accreditation of Medical Physics Education Programs (CAMPEP) (CHEA-recognized, not USDE-recognized)
- Commission on Collegiate Nursing Education (CCNE) (Not CHEA-recognized, USDE-recognized although not eligible for Title IV funding)
- Commission on Dental Accreditation, American Dental Association (CODA) (Not CHEA-recognized, USDE-recognized although not eligible for Title IV funding)
- Commission on English Language Program Accreditation (CEA) (Not CHEA-recognized, USDE-recognized although not eligible for Title IV funding)
- Commission on Massage Therapy Accreditation (COMTA) (Not CHEA-recognized, USDE-recognized)
- Commission on Opticianry Accreditation (COA-OP) (CHEA-recognized, not USDE-recognized)
- Commission on Sport Management Accreditation (COSMA) (CHEA-recognized, not USDE-recognized)
- Council for Accreditation of Counseling and Related Educational Programs (CACREP) (CHEA-recognized, not USDE-recognized)
- Council for Interior Design Accreditation (CIDA) (CHEA-recognized, not USDE-recognized)
- Council for Standards in Human Service Education (CSHSE) (CHEA-recognized, not USDE-recognized)
- Council for the Accreditation of Educator Preparation (CAEP) (CHEA-recognized, not USDE-recognized)
- Council of the Section of Legal Education and Admissions to the Bar, American Bar Association (ABA) (Not CHEA-recognized, USDE-recognized)
- Council on Academic Accreditation in Audiology and Speech-Language Pathology, American Speech-Language-Hearing Association (CAA-ASHA) (CHEA-recognized, USDE-recognized although not eligible for Title IV funding)
- Council on Accreditation of Nurse Anesthesia Educational Programs (COA) (CHEA-recognized, USDE-recognized)
- Council on Accreditation of Parks, Recreation, Tourism and Related Professions (COAPRT) (CHEA-recognized, not USDE-recognized)
- Council on Chiropractic Education (CCE) (CHEA-recognized, USDE-recognized)
- Council on Education for Public Health (CEPH) (Not CHEA-recognized, USDE-recognized although not eligible for Title IV funding)
- Council on Naturopathic Medical Education (CNME) (Not CHEA-recognized, USDE-recognized although not eligible for Title IV funding)
- Council on Social Work Education, Commission on Accreditation (CSWE-COA) (CHEA-recognized, not USDE-recognized)
- International Accreditation Council for Business Education (IACBE) (CHEA-recognized, not USDE-recognized)
- International Fire Service Accreditation Congress - Degree Assembly (IFSAC-DA) (CHEA-recognized, not USDE-recognized)
- Joint Review Committee on Education in Radiologic Technology (JRCERT) (CHEA-recognized, USDE-recognized)
- Joint Review Committee on Educational Programs in Nuclear Medicine Technology (JRCNMT) (CHEA-recognized, not USDE-recognized)
- Landscape Architectural Accreditation Board, American Society of Landscape Architects (LAAB-ASLA) (CHEA-recognized, not USDE-recognized)
- Liaison Committee on Medical Education (LCME) (Not CHEA-recognized, USDE-recognized although not eligible for Title IV funding)
- Masters in Psychology and Counseling Accreditation Council (MPCAC) (CHEA-recognized, not USDE-recognized)
- Midwifery Education Accreditation Council (MEAC) (Not CHEA-recognized, USDE-recognized)
- Montessori Accreditation Council for Teacher Education (MACTE) (Not CHEA-recognized, USDE-recognized)
- National Accrediting Agency for Clinical Laboratory Sciences (NAACLS) (CHEA-recognized, not USDE-recognized)
- National Association for the Education of Young Children (NAEYC) (CHEA-recognized, not USDE-recognized)
- National Association of School Psychologists (NASP) (CHEA-recognized)
- National Association of Schools of Art and Design Commission on Accreditation (NASAD) (Not CHEA-recognized, USDE-recognized)
- National Association of Schools of Dance Commission on Accreditation (NASD) (Not CHEA-recognized, USDE-recognized)
- National Association of Schools of Music Commission on Accreditation (NASM) (Not CHEA-recognized, USDE-recognized)
- National Association of Schools of Theatre Commission on Accreditation (NAST) (Not CHEA-recognized, USDE-recognized)
- National Council for Accreditation of Teacher Education (NCATE) (CHEA-recognized, USDE-recognized)
- Network of Schools of Public Policy, Affairs, and Administration, Commission on Peer Review and Accreditation (NASPAA-COPRA) (CHEA-recognized, not USDE-recognized)
- Planning Accreditation Board (PAB) (CHEA-recognized, not USDE-recognized)
- Psychological Clinical Science Accreditation System (PCSAS) (CHEA-recognized, not USDE-recognized)

== Vietnam ==
- Vietnam National University of Hanoi - Center for Education Accreditation
- Vietnam National University of Ho Chi Minh City - Center for Education Accreditation
- Danang University - Center for Education Accreditation
- Vinh University - Center for Education Accreditation
- Association of Vietnam Universities and Colleges - Center for Education Accreditation

== See also ==
- Central and East European Management Development Association
- International Association of Universities
- List of unrecognized higher education accreditation organizations
