= Nepal Law Commission =

Organization

- Formation: First 1953; Current 14 January 2007
- Type: Agency of Government of Nepal
- Legal status: Permanent
- Purpose: Drafting of laws and Legal Research in Nepal
- Location: International Convention Center, New Baneshwor Kathmandu
- Members: Chairman, 1 Permanent Member, 1 Member Secretary, and 6 Part-time Members
- Chairman: Vacant
- Website: www.lawcommission.gov.np

Nepal Law Commission is a statutory body formed in order to draft laws, conduct legal research and initiate legal reforms in Nepal.

== Background ==
The Nepal Law Commission (NLC) was first constituted by an executive decision in 1953, immediately after the downfall of multiparty democracy. The second, third, fourth and fifth Commissions were constituted in 1960, 1963, 1972 and 1979 respectively. These Commissions were temporary in nature. The NLC was given permanent status only in 1984. After the restoration of multiparty democracy in 1990, NLC was restructured with the mandate commensurate with the changed context. It was again restructured in 2003 with timely changes in its mandate and composition. Now, the Commission stands as a statutory body formed under the Nepal Law Commission Act, 2007, which was promulgated on 14 January 2007. Until then, it used to be constituted by executive decision.

== Composition ==
The Commission consists of nine members including the chairperson, vice-chairperson and seven members.

The chairperson and the vice-chairperson are appointed by the Government of Nepal for a tenure of five years. Other three members consisting of at least one woman are nominated by the same for two years. Retired judges of the Supreme Court or those who are qualified for the same are eligible to be appointed as the chairperson, vice-chairperson and members.

The Secretary at the Ministry of Law, Justice and Parliamentary Affairs, Secretary (Law) at the Office of the Prime Minister and Council of Ministers, a Deputy Attorney General nominated by the Attorney General of Nepal and the Secretary at the NLC, who also serves as a Member-Secretary, are ex officio members.

The Government may appoint not more than five members as honorary members to the commission from among outstanding experts in the pertinent field.

There is a provision of a Recommendation Committee composed of the Minister for Law, Justice and Parliamentary Affairs, chairperson of the Law, Justice and Parliamentary Committee of the House of Representatives* and chairperson of the Nepal Bar Association to recommend to the Government of Nepal for appointment in the post of chairperson, vice-chairperson and members of the commission.

== Function, duty and power ==
- To draft new legislation and amendment of the statute with explanatory notes,
- To codify, unify and review existing laws,
- To draft legislation to include treaty obligation,
- To exchange ideas and information with law commissions and law drafting agencies of other countries,
- To carry out study and research works,
- To make consultation with stakeholders,
- To obtain expert service.
- To prepare annual programs and annual progress report,
- To accomplish other functions relating to law and justice as prescribed by the Government and as deemed necessary by the Commission itself,
- To make necessary recommendation to the Government.

== Process ==
=== Initiation of tasks ===
The commission may initiate drafting and law reform process either on referral of the concerned ministry or on its own. It may also receive a proposal from stakeholders, i.e. individual, non-governmental organization, civil society and community organization.

=== Formation of working team ===
The Commission decides annual program on the basis of the priority and forms working team (WT) involving experts to act on approved area by providing clear mandate and time frame. Generally, one member of the Commission heads the WT or it is headed by any reputed personality in the relevant field.

=== Preparation of consultation paper ===
The WT carries out in-depth study of the issue under review. For this purpose, WT may invite expert, stakeholder and government official for consultation as an invitee member. The WT prepares a consultation/issue paper and it is made available to any person interested. WT can also opt appropriate methods of research for data collection.

=== Organizing seminar/workshop ===
On the basis of responses to the consultation/issue paper, the WT prepares its initial draft report with provisional recommendations. Thereafter, the WT may organize seminar/workshop inviting prominent scholars, activists and other key stakeholders. The initial draft report is circulated well in advance to the participants, inviting for well-versed comments.

=== Final report and draft bill ===
On the basis of output obtained from seminar/workshop, the WT prepares final report and drafts a Bill with explanatory notes. The final report of the WT is handed over to the Commission for deliberation. Each report and draft Bill is presented by the WT in the Commission meeting. Both the Report and the Bill are finalized by the Commission.

=== Submission to the government for further action ===
The final report along with the draft Bill is submitted to the concerned Ministry for further action. Where possible, the Commission’s final report is published. Such report is made available in NLC library.

== Administrative structure and staff ==
The Secretary at the NLC is the administrative head of the organization. Under the Secretary, there are two Divisions headed by Joint-secretaries, viz. the Research and Drafting Division that carries out the line functions of the Commission and the Administrative Division that is entrusted to perform administrative tasks. Under each division, there is one section headed by Under-secretary who is supported by a Section Officer. There are other sixteen subordinate employees. The NLC has a total strength of 23 human resources.

== See also ==
- Nepal Bar Council
