= List of sitting judges of the Supreme Court of Nepal =

This is a list of judges of the Supreme Court of Nepal, the highest court in Nepal. The list is ordered according to seniority. There are currently 17 judges (including the chief justice), with the maximum possible number being 21. As per the Constitution of Nepal, judges of the Supreme Court must take a mandatory retirement aged 65.

Currently, Justice Manoj Kumar Sharma is the Chief Justice since 19 May 2026.

== List of Judges ordered by seniority ==
Sr. No.	Name	Gender	Date of appointment	Date of retirement	Appointed from
1	Manoj Kumar Sharma (Chief Justice)	Male	19 April 2019 (7 years, 199 days)	18 May 2032 (−5 years, 196 days)	Bar
2	Sapana Pradhan Malla	Female	1 August 2016 (10 years, 95 days)	14 November 2028 (−2 years, 10 days)	Bar
3	Kumar Regmi	Male	19 April 2019 (7 years, 199 days)	6 September 2031 (−4 years, 306 days)	Bar
4	Hari Prasad Phuyal	Male	19 April 2019 (7 years, 199 days)	5 October 2035 (−8 years, 335 days)	Bar
5	Nahakul Subedi	Male	19 April 2021 (5 years, 199 days)	21 June 2036 (−9 years, 230 days)	Surkhet High Court
8	Saranga Subedi	Female	20 December 2023 (2 years, 319 days)	2 February 2032 (−5 years, 90 days)	Janakpur High Court
9	Abdul Ajiz Musalman	Male	20 December 2023 (2 years, 319 days)	23 March 2030 (−3 years, 139 days)	Patan High Court, Hetauda Bench
10	Mahesh Sharma Poudel	Male	20 December 2023 (2 years, 319 days)	23 May 2030 (−3 years, 200 days)	Patan High Court
11	Tek Prasad Dhungana	Male	20 December 2023 (2 years, 319 days)	20 December 2036 (−10 years, 46 days)	Patan High Court
12	Sunil Kumar Pokharel	Male	20 December 2023 (2 years, 319 days)	18 October 2034 (−7 years, 348 days)	Bar
13	Balkrishna Dhakal	Male	20 December 2023 (2 years, 319 days)	18 June 2034 (−7 years, 226 days)	Bar
14	Nripadhwoj Niraula	Male	10 November 2024 (1 year, 359 days)	7 February 2037 (−10 years, 95 days)	Patan High Court
15	Nityananda Pandeya	Male	10 November 2024 (1 year, 359 days)	24 February 2031 (−4 years, 112 days)	Tulsipur High Court
16	Meghraj Pokhrel	Male			
17	Shreekanta Poudel	Male			
18	Shanti Singh Thapa	Female			

== See also ==
- List of chief justices of Nepal
