= Torture of Hom Bahadur Bagale =

2002 Hom Bahadur Bagale Torture Case
- Location: 27.7172°N 85.3240°E; Kathmandu, Nepal
- Date: Nov 2002
- Target: Hom Bahadur Bagale
- Attack type: Torture, Ill-treatment
- Victim: Hom Bahadur Bagale
- Perpetrators: Armed Police Force and Royal Nepalese Army

Hom Bahadur Bagale was a police sub-inspector in Nepal Police serving from 13 February 1984. He had been serving as a technical sub-inspector in the police band and was accused of stealing gold from his superior. Bagale was detained without being presented to court within 24 hours. He was kept in custody, handcuffed, and was forced to wear a hood and placed in solitary confinements. He was captured and tortured on 28 November 2002. Bagale managed to escape and then he was again taken to Armed Police Battalion on 5 February 2003 and detained until 3 April 2003. He was further detained on 20 March 2006 at the Armed Police Battalion No. 1 until 22 March 2006 and then he was detained and brought to the police facility at Hanumandhoka where he was held until March 28, 2006. He was tortured and ill-treated. His tortures and captivity were ruled illegal by the court. Concerns of his safety was raised by international organizations and the wider public.

== Courts and legal fights ==
Bagale filed a complaint to Nepal Police Headquarters about ill-treatment beating and torture without a proper warrant and registration of the case. He also filed a complaint in the Kathmandu District Court on 10 January 2003, but was pressured and compelled to withdraw the complaints. On 4 April 2003, Bagale filed a petition before the National Human Rights Commission (NHRC) and the Chief District Officer. Kathmandu District Court rejected Bagale's complaint, Appellate upheld KDC's ruling and in September 2014 the Supreme Court also upheld the ruling by lower courts. On 26 April 2006, Mr. Bagale filed a petition to the Kathmandu District Court against 12 perpetrator policemen. He asked for the reparation of Nepalese Rupees 100,000. On 18 September 2008, Kathmandu District Court ruled that Bagale had been tortured and ordered the government to provide the reparation of Rupees 21,000 but denied to take departmental action against the perpetrators. Bagale did not receive the compensation as the court ruled out. In 2015, Bagale filed a case with the Human Rights Committee with support from TRIAL International. HRC decided in November 2020 that Mr. Bagale was the victim of the violation of the rights against liberty, security, privacy, and arbitrary interference with family and was indicated the various reparation measures.
