= Office of the Auditor General (Nepal) =

Government agency of Nepal

- महालेखा परीक्षकको कार्यालय
- Emblem of Nepal

Constitutional Body overview
- Formed: 29 June 1959; 67 years ago
- Jurisdiction: Government of Nepal
- Headquarters: Anamnagar, Kathmandu
- Employees: 643
- Annual budget: NRs 3.2 million (charged) & NRs 735 million (appropriated) for FY 2024-25
- Constitutional Body executive: Toyam Raya, Auditor General
- Website: oag.gov.np

Office of the Auditor General (OAGN) is a constitutional body and the supreme audit institution of Nepal. It derives its mandate from Article 241 of the Constitution of Nepal and Audit Act, 2075 (2019 A.D.). The Auditor General is empowered to undertake audits of Office of the President and Vice-President, Supreme Court, Federal Parliament, Provincial Assemblies, Provincial Governments, Constitutional bodies or their offices, courts, the Attorney General and the Nepal Army, Nepal Police and Armed Police as well as of all other government offices and courts with due consideration given to the regularity, economy, efficiency, effectiveness and the propriety of government expenditures.

== Auditor General ==
According to Article 240 of the Constitution of Nepal, the Auditor General is appointed by the President on the recommendation of the Constitutional Council for a single term of six years. The current Auditor General, Toyam Raya, was appointed on April 18, 2024.

== Organization and Structure ==
In addition to the Auditor General, there are 614 staff positions in the organization. These consist of 4 Deputy Auditor Generals, 18 Assistant Auditor Generals, Directors, Audit Officers, Audit superintendents, Audit Inspectors and support staff. The majority of the staff are members of the Audit Service of the Nepal Civil Service who are chosen through an open competitive exam of the Public Service Commission. The office is divided into four divisions each headed by a Deputy Auditor General. Under the divisions are 18 General Directorates which are further divided into 37 sector wise Directorates.

Title	Rank	Number	Civil Service
Deputy Auditor General	Special Class Officer	4	Nepal Audit
Assistant Auditor General	Gazetted First Class Officer	18	Nepal Audit
Director	Gazetted Second Class Officer	111	Nepal Audit
Director	Gazetted Second Class Officer	1	Nepal Law
Director	Gazetted Second Class Officer	1	Nepal Miscellaneous
Audit Officer	Gazetted Third Class Officer	255	Nepal Audit
Audit Superintendent	Non-Gazetted First Class Officer	130	Nepal Audit
Audit Inspector	Non-Gazetted Second Class Officer	16	Nepal Audit

=== Divisions ===
- Governance System Division
- Finance and Economy Division
- Infrastructure Development Division
- Social Service Division

== Annual Report ==
The Auditor General submits an annual report, which includes an opinion regarding the financial statements of the Government of Nepal, to the President as per Article 294 of the Constitution of Nepal. The President then presents the report for discussion to the Federal Parliament, through the Prime Minister.

== Prominent issues raised ==
In its 54th annual report (2017), the office raised questions on the legality of Tax Clearance Commission formed in 2015 which had provided discounts of NRS. 20.5 billion to various taxpayers. The commission was formed under Tax Clearance Commission Act, 1976 but was determined to be against the provision of the Income Tax Act, 2002 which provided separate avenues to dispute tax assessments. The Tax Clearance Commission Act, 1976 was then repealed by parliament in 2019 and the three members of the commission was subsequently found guilty of corruption.
