= Hong Kong Council =

Hong Kong Council may refer to:

- Hong Kong Council for Accreditation of Academic and Vocational Qualifications, a council accrediting higher education courses
- Hong Kong Trade Development Council, a global marketing arm and service hub for Hong Kong-based manufacturers and traders
- The Hong Kong Council of Social Service, a council coordinating NGOs in the social service field in Hong Kong
- Hong Kong Council of the Church of Christ in China, a Protestant Christian church organisation in Hong Kong
