= Nepal Bar Council =

Regulatory body for legal practice in Nepal

Statutory body overview
- Formed: 11 August 1994; 31 years ago
- Headquarters: Kupondole, Lalitpur
- Statutory body executive: The Attorney General of Nepal, Ex officio chairman
- Website: https://nepalbarcouncil.org.np

Nepal Bar Council is an independent legal institution established by the Nepal Bar Council Act, 1993 with a major objective to regulate law practice in Nepal. It conducts examination for issuing the licence for law practice and keeps record of the law practitioners.

== Membership ==
Any Nepali Citizen who passed the Legal Practitioner examination with five years of experience can take part in the membership process. Legal Practitioner is the one who passed Bachelor's degree while a Pleader is one who passes the intermediate degree in law.

== Councilors ==
Nepal Bar Council has the following Councilors:

1. The Attorney General of Nepal
2. President of Nepal Bar Association
3. Registrar of Supreme Court of Nepal
4. Dean of Institute of Law from Tribhuvan University
5. Senior advocates elected from each Provinces of Nepal
6. Two senior advocates nominated by Nepal Bar Association

== Examination of Legal Practitioners ==
Nepal Bar Council carries out Exams for Legal Practitioners at least once a year. The mode of examination is written and oral Examination.

== Nepal Bar Council Office ==
Nepal Bar Council Office is located at Kupandole, Lalitpur.

== Controversies ==
- The appointment of councilors are said to be politically influenced.

== See also ==
- Nepal Bar Association
- Nepal Medical Council
- Nepal Engineering Council
