= Nahakul Subedi =

Nepalese judge

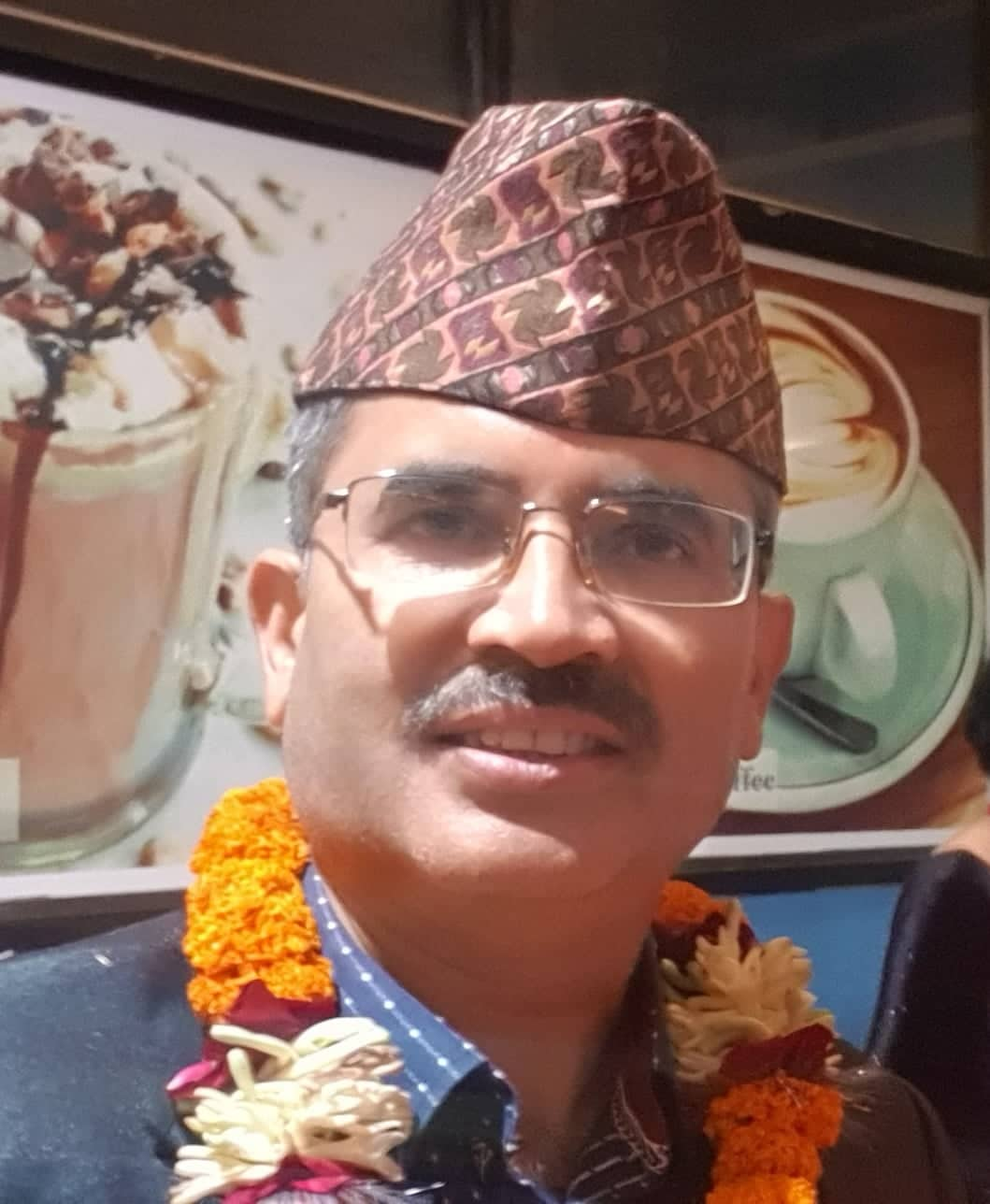
Nahakul Subedi

Nahakul Subedi (born 22 June 1971) is a sitting justice of the Supreme Court of Nepal. The Nepalese Supreme Court is composed of the Chief Justice, and twenty Justices. The Chief Justice is appointed by the President on the recommendation of the Constitutional Council.

== See also ==
- List of sitting judges of the Supreme Court of Nepal
