= Supreme Court Bar Association =

Supreme Court Bar Association may refer to:

- Supreme Court Bar Association (India)
- Supreme Court Bar Association (Nepal)
- Supreme Court Bar Association of Pakistan
- Bangladesh Supreme Court Bar Association
