= SBCA =

SBCA may refer to:

- San Bernardino, California
- Satellite Broadcasting and Communications Association, the national trade organization representing the consumer satellite industry in US
- San Beda College Alabang, a college in Muntinlupa, Philippines

== See also ==
- SCBA (disambiguation)
