= North Central Association of Colleges and Schools =

Defunct education accreditation association (1895–2014)

- NCA logo
- Abbreviation: NCA
- Successor: AdvancED; Higher Learning Commission
- Formation: 1895
- Legal status: defunct 2014
- Purpose: Educational accreditation
- Headquarters: Tempe, Arizona; Chicago, Illinois
- Region served: Arkansas, Arizona, Colorado, Illinois, Indiana, Iowa, Kansas, Michigan, Minnesota, Missouri, Nebraska, New Mexico, North Dakota, Ohio, Oklahoma, South Dakota, West Virginia, Wisconsin, Wyoming
- Main organ: Board of Directors
- Affiliations: CHEA
- Website: www.northcentralassociation.org

The North Central Association of Colleges and Schools (NCA), also known as the North Central Association, was a membership organization, consisting of colleges, universities, and schools in 19 U.S. states engaged in educational accreditation. It was one of six regional accreditation bodies in the U.S. and its Higher Learning Commission was recognized by the United States Department of Education and the Council for Higher Education Accreditation (CHEA) as a regional accreditor for higher education institutions.

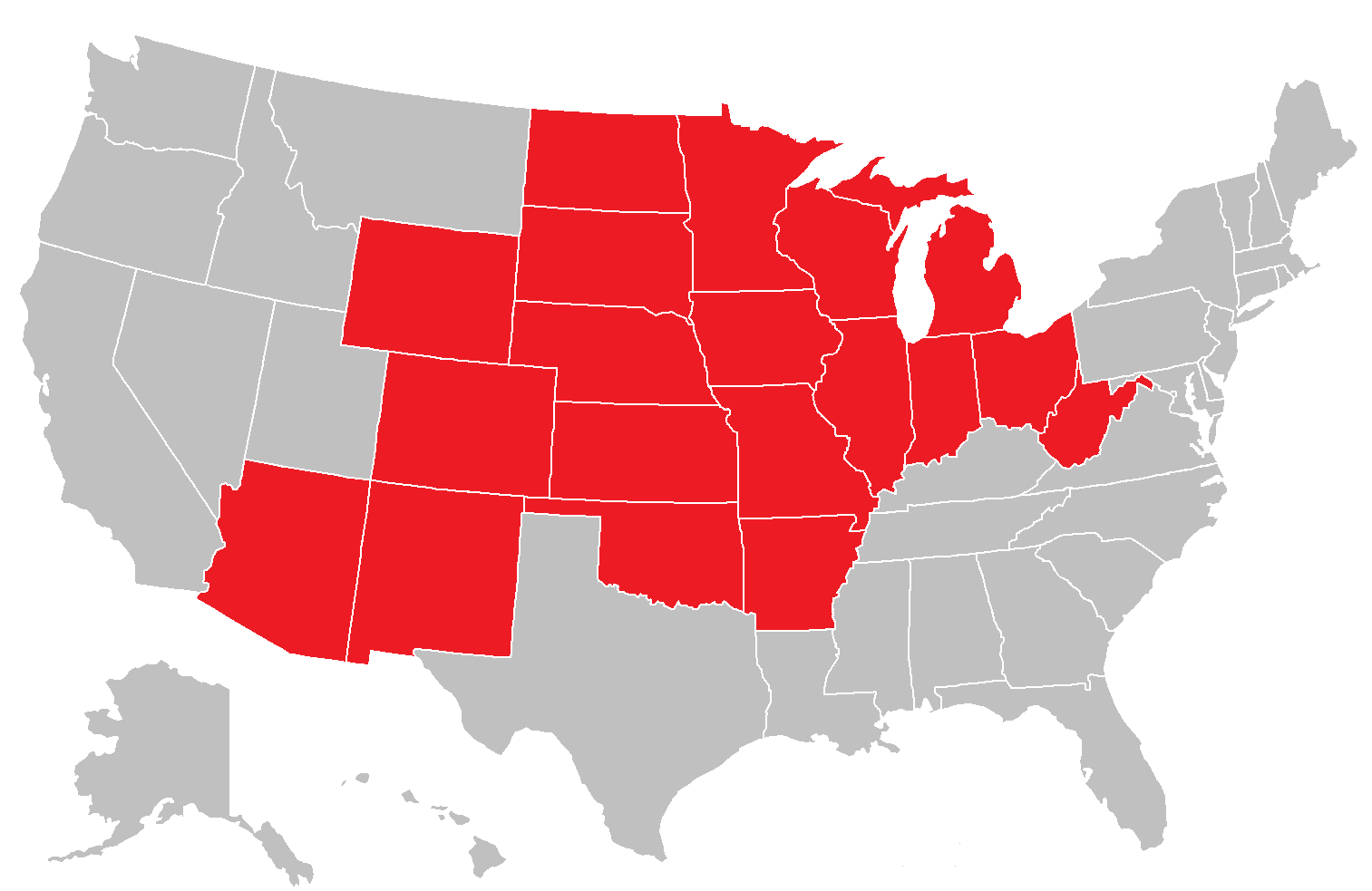
North Central Association territory

The organization was dissolved in 2014. The primary and secondary education accreditation functions of the association have been merged into AdvancED with the postsecondary education accreditation functions vested in the Higher Learning Commission.

== See also ==
- List of recognized accreditation associations of higher learning
