= Office of the Attorney General, Nepal =

Government office in Nepal

- महान्यायाधिवक्ताको कार्यालय, नेपाल

Constitutional Body overview
- Formed: 1951
- Jurisdiction: Government of Nepal
- Headquarters: Singha Durbar Plaza, Kathmandu
- Employees: 393
- Constitutional Body executive: Dr. Narayan Datta Kandel, Attorney General
- Website: ag.gov.np

Office of the Attorney General (OAG) (Nepali: महान्यायाधिवक्ताको कार्यालय, नेपाल) is a constitutional body of Nepal, The main function is to provide legal advice to the Government of Nepal and other officials designated by the Government of Nepal on constitutional and legal matters.

== Attorney General ==
According to the Sub-Article 2 of Article 157 of the Constitution of Nepal, the Attorney General is appointed by the President on the recommendation of the prime ministers. The same Sub-Article states that the Attorney General shall hold the office during the pleasure of the Prime Minister. The current Attorney General, Dr. Narayan Datta Kandel was appointed on 5 April 2026.

== List of Attorney General ==
1. Khamma Bahadur Khati (16 July 2021 - 26 December 2022)

Hon. Attorney General Mr. Khamma Bahadur Khati is the incumbent and twenty-eighth Attorney General of Nepal. He has been practicing law as an Advocate for the last 28 years. He had served as a Secretary General of the Nepal Bar Association. He also served in the various committees of the Nepal Bar Association. Previously he served in several positions of Kathmandu District Bar Association. He holds Master's Degree in Humanities & Social Science, Bachelor in Laws (B.L.), and Bachelor's in Humanities & Social Science from Tribhuvan University. He is a notable figure in the field of Civil & Commercial Laws. He had also participated in several national and international programs in several areas of law.

2. Ramesh Badal (21 March 2021 - 13 July 2021)

Mr. Ramesh Badal was the twenty-seventh Attorney General of Nepal. He holds a Master of Labour Laws and Labour Welfare Degree from Pune University, India, and a Diploma in International Labour Standards and ILO Declaration on Fundamental Principles of Rights at Work from the International Training Center of ILO, Italy. He has been practicing law as an Advocate for the last 27 years. Previously, he served as the President and Secretary of the Appellate Court Bar Association, Patan (now the High Court Bar Association, Patan). He also served on the various committees of the Nepal Bar Association. He is a notable figure in the field of Labour Laws. Previously, he served in several leadership positions in labor organizations and played a pivotal role in the drafting of labor laws and standards. He is recognized for his contributions to establishing the Social Security Fund and Social Security Schemes. He has also facilitated as an Expert in several international and national platforms. During his tenure, the Third Five-Year Strategic Plan of the Office of the Attorney General was introduced.

3. Agni Prasad Kharel (2018 Feb 18 – 2021 Mar 19)

Senior Advocate Mr. Agni Prasad Kharel was the 26th Attorney General of Nepal. Previously, he served as the Minister of Law, Justice and Parliamentary Affairs, Member of Constituent Assembly, and General Secretary of the Nepal Bar Association. Specifically, he had played an instrumental role in the constitution drafting process. He had been accredited for leading the prosecution system to effectively implement the newly enacted Criminal Codes. He led the office to implement the Second Strategic Plan. There had been rapid infrastructure development works (with the construction of more than three dozen Government Attorneys' Offices), including the construction of the new building Office of the Attorney General, Nepal. During his tenure, the number of Government Attorneys and Staff was increased, and the coordination with the Chief Attorney Offices was also enhanced. He played a pivotal role in enhancing the capacity of government attorneys. During his tenure, the Office became a member of the International Association of Prosecutors.

4. Basanta Ram Bhandari (18 August 2017 - 15 February 2018)

Senior Advocate Mr. Basanta Ram Bhandari served as the twenty-fifth Attorney General of Nepal. Previously, he served as an Executive Member of the Nepal Bar Association and president of the Supreme Court Bar Association. He has been practicing law for more than four decades.

5. Raman Kumar Shrestha (8 August 2016 - 13 August 2017)

Senior Advocate Mr. Raman Kumar Shrestha served as the twenty-fourth Attorney General of Nepal. Previously, he served as the General Secretary of the Nepal Bar Association. He is recognized for his contributions in implementing the Strategic Plan of the Office. He played an important role in the institutional reforms of the office. He also introduced the National Conference of Government Attorneys and the National Conference of Investigator and Prosecutor.

6. Hari Prasad Phuyal ( 18 April 2016 - 4 August 2016)

Mr. Hari Prasad Phuyal served as the twenty-third Attorney General of Nepal. He is recognized for his contributions in framing and implementing the Second Strategic Plan of the Office of the Attorney General, Nepal. He is currently serving as the Justice of the Supreme Court of Nepal.

7. Hari Krishna Karki ( 15 October 2015 - 1 March 2016)

Senior Advocate Mr. Hari Krishna Karki served as the twenty-second Attorney General of Nepal. Previously, he served as the President and General Secretary of the Nepal Bar Association. He served as chief justice of the Supreme Court of Nepal from 16 June 2023 to 4 August 2023 and is now retired.

8. Baburam Kunwar ( 17 February 2014 - 12 October 2015)

Senior Advocate Mr. Baburam Kunwar served as the twenty-first Attorney General of Nepal. Later, he became the first Provincial Chief of Gandaki Province.
