= Janaki Medical College =

Medical school in Janakpur, Nepal

- जानकी मेडिकल कलेज
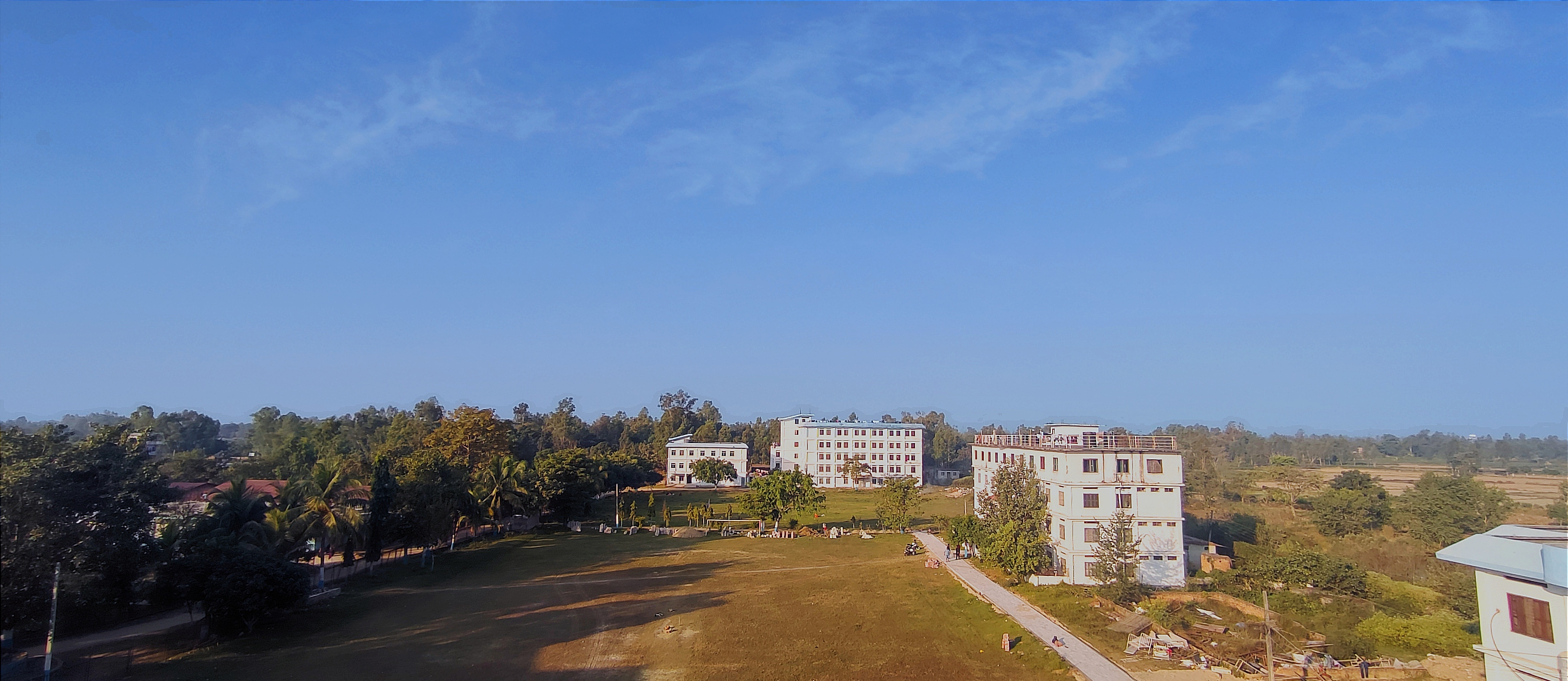
- Janaki medical college premises
- Motto: To help enhance the quality of life
- Type: Private
- Established: 2003; 23 years ago
- Accreditation: Nepal Medical Council
- Academic affiliation: Tribhuvan University
- Director: Om Prasad Pandey
- Management: Ram Janaki Health Foundation
- Location: Janakpur, Nepal; 26.8155°N 85.9539°E
- Campus: Urban
- Website: www.janakimedicalcollege.edu.np

Janaki Medical College and Teaching Hospital is a medical college located near Janakpur in the Dhanusha District of Nepal.

== History ==
The college was established in 2003 with an annual intake of 80 students a year to a Bachelor of Medicine and Bachelor of Surgery program. In addition to its Bachelor of Medicine and Bachelor of Surgery program, the college also offers nursing courses at an affordable fee structure. In 2020, the college created a Post Graduate program in department of Surgery and department of Emergency Medicine.

== Operations ==
The college operates two hospitals: a smaller 150 bed hospital in Ramaidaiya Bhawadi and a large 350+ bed hospital at Bramhapuri, Janakpur, Nepal. It provides healthcare education in association with Tribhuvan University Institute of Medicine and regulated by Nepal Medical Council. It is managed by the Ram Janaki Health Foundation which is registered under the Nepalese Companies Act.

== Programs ==
The college offers following programs:

- Bachelor of Medicine and Bachelor of Surgery (MBBS)
- Post Graduate - MD/MS
- Bachelor of Nursing
