= National Council for Accreditation of Teacher Education =

Professional accreditor focused on accrediting teacher education programs

- Established: 1954
- Type: Professional accreditation, National accreditation
- Headquarters: Washington, D.C., U.S.
- Website: www.caepnet.org

The National Council for Accreditation of Teacher Education (NCATE) was a professional accreditor focused on accrediting teacher education programs in U.S. colleges and universities. It was founded in 1954 and was recognized as an accreditor by the U.S. Department of Education.

== Merger ==
On July 1, 2013, NCATE merged with the Teacher Education Accreditation Council (TEAC), which was also a recognized accreditor of teacher-preparation programs, to form the Council for the Accreditation of Educator Preparation (CAEP).

== Founding organizations ==
Five national education groups were instrumental in the creation of NCATE:

1. The American Association of Colleges for Teacher Education (AACTE, which formerly accredited teachers colleges)
2. The National Education Association (NEA)
3. The National School Boards Association (NSBA)
4. The National Association of State Directors of Teacher Education and Certification (NASDTEC)
5. The Council of Chief State School Officers (CCSSO)

== Coalition of organizations ==
NCATE was a coalition of 33 member organizations of teachers, teacher educators, content specialists, and local and state policy makers. All are committed to quality teaching, and together, the coalition represented over 3 million individuals. The professional associations that comprise NCATE also provided financial support and participated in the development of NCATE standards, policies, and procedures.

== See also ==
- List of recognized accreditation associations of higher learning
