= National Human Rights Commission (Nepal) =

Nepalese constitutional body for human rights

- Formation: 2000
- Type: Governmental organization
- Location: Harihar Bhawan, Pulchowk, Lalitpur, Nepal
- Website: www.nhrcnepal.org

The National Human Rights Commission (NHRC; Nepali: राष्ट्रिय मानव अधिकार आयोग, romanized: Rāṣṭriya mānava adhikāra āyōga) of Nepal is an independent and autonomous constitutional body. It was established in the year 2000 as a statutory body under the Human Rights Commission Act 1997 (2053 BS). The Interim Constitution of Nepal 2007 (2063 BS) made the NHRC a constitutional body. It has a separate sphere of responsibilities in the constitutional legal system of the country. These responsibilities complement the responsibilities of the normal machinery of the administration of Justice, the Supreme Court, the Office of the Attorney General, the Commission for the Investigation of Abuse of Authority, and other existing executive, quasi-judicial or judicial bodies of Nepal.

The Commission was created in response to a 1991 UN-sponsored meeting of representatives of national institutions held in Paris, which laid down a detailed set of principles on the status of national institutions commonly known as the Paris Principles. These principles, subsequently endorsed by the UN Commission on Human Rights (Resolution 1992/54 of 3 March 1992) and the UN General Assembly (Resolution 48/134 of 20 December 1993, annex) have become the foundation and reference point for the establishment and operation of the National Human Rights Commission of Nepal as well.

The establishment and constitution of the Commission complies with the minimum standards set out in the 'Paris Principles'. To name a few, they are independence guaranteed by statute or constitution; autonomy from executive, pluralism, including in membership; a broad mandate based on universal human rights standards; and adequate powers of investigation. Article 132 of the Interim Constitution of Nepal vests primary responsibility in the Commission to protect and promote the human rights of Nepalese people. In order to perform this responsibility, the Commission can conduct inquiries and investigations, on its own or upon a petition or complaint files to it on violation of human rights and abetment thereon, and carelessness and negligence in the prevention of violations of the human rights by any person, organization or authority concerned. It can also inquire into a matter with the permission of the court in respect of any claim on violations of human rights, which is sub-judice in the court. The Commission can visit and observe any authority, jail or any organization under the Government of Nepal and to submit necessary recommendations to it on the reform to be made on the functions, procedures and physical facilities which may be made necessary for such an organization for the protection of human rights.

Apart from these powers, the Constitution maintains that the Commission may review the provisions on safeguards provided by the Constitution and other prevailing law for the enforcement of human rights and submit necessary recommendations for the effective implementation of such provisions. The power encompasses the study of international treaties and instruments on human rights and submits the necessary and appropriate recommendations to the Government for effective implementation of the related provisions. As such, it can also make necessary recommendations to the Government of Nepal regarding reports to be furnished by Nepal pursuant to the provisions of international treaties on human rights. On the matters of Nepal's obligation to furnish reports under international treaties on human rights, the government is obligated to furnish reports upon receiving the opinion of the Commission thereon.

The Commission is also responsible to undertake or cause to be undertaken research in the field of human rights, and evaluate the existing human rights situation of the country. It may publicize and propagate human rights education among the various sections of society through various seminars, symposia, conferences and also build consciousness and awareness about the guarantees bestowed by law for the protection of human rights. Another power of the Commission is to encourage the functioning and efforts of institutions working in the non-governmental sector. In addition, there is a general power to carry out such activities, as the Commission may deem necessary and appropriate for the enforcement, promotion and protection of human rights.

The Commission has one chairperson and four other members; all of them are full-time appointees, who are appointed by the president upon the recommendation of the Constitutional Council. The secretary of the Commission is the focal point for the administration. He/she is appointed by the prime minister on the recommendation of the Commission. The Commission has power to appoint employees as may be required to carry out its functions. In case the Commission requests any government office for assistance in the performance of its functions, the office so requested must provide the required assistance.

The budget of the Commission comes from the Government of Nepal, but may also obtain such means and resources from different agencies by way of grants as are required for the performance of its functions. The account of the Commission is to be audited by the auditor general of Nepal.
