= Nepal Nursing Council =

Nepal statutory body

- Abbreviation: NNC
- Formation: 1996 June 16
- Headquarters: Bansbari, Kathmandu
- Leader: Prof. Goma Devi Niraula Shrestha, President
- Main organ: Council
- Affiliations: Government of Nepal
- Website: Official website

The Nepal Nursing Council (NNC) is a statutory body for establishing uniform and high standards of Nursing education in Nepal. The Council grants recognition of nursing qualifications, gives accreditation to Nursing schools, administers Nursing Licensing Exam (NLEN) and maintains the registration of Registered Nurses in Nepal.

NNC was established in 1996 under Nepal Nursing Council Act 1996. Chairperson of NNC is nominated by the Nepal government from among qualified individuals.

NNC is one of many statutory bodies related to Healthcare in Nepal. Other are Nepal Medical Council, Nepal Pharmacy Council, Nepal Ayurvedic Medical Council, Nepal Health Professional Council, Nepal Health Research Council.

== See also ==
- Nepal Engineering Council
- Nepal Medical Council
