= SCBA (disambiguation) =

SCBA is self-contained breathing apparatus.

SCBA may also refer to:

- Swimmer Canoeist's Breathing Apparatus, and Submerged Chamber Breathing Apparatus, similar to Siebe Gorman CDBA
- Southern California Baseball Association
- Supreme Court Bar Association (India)
- Supreme Court Bar Association (Nepal)
- Balmaceda Airport in Chile, ICAO airport code SCBA
