= Hari Prasad Phuyal =

Supreme Court of Nepal justice since 2019

- हरि प्रसाद फुयाल

Justice of the Supreme Court of Nepal
- Incumbent
- Assumed office 19 April 2019

Personal details
- Born: October 6, 1970 (age 56)
- Education: Mahendra Multiple Campus, Nepalgunj (I.L); Nepal Law Campus (LLB); National Law School of India University (LL.M.); University of Essex (LL.M.)

Hari Prasad Phuyal (Nepali: हरि प्रसाद फुयाल, born 1970) is a Nepalese lawyer and a justice on the Supreme Court of Nepal since 19 April 2019.

== Early life and education ==
Hari Prasad Phuyal was born on 6 October 1970. He obtained an Intermediate in Law (I.L) degree from Mahendra Multiple Campus, Nepalgunj in 1989 and a Bachelor of Laws (LLB) degree from Nepal Law Campus in 1992. He obtained a Master of Laws degree from National Law School of India University in 1995 and a Master of Laws degree from University of Essex in 2005.

== Career ==
Phuyal has worked as the national legal adviser at the Office of the United Nations High Commissioner for Human Rights, as a senior legal adviser to the International Commission of Jurists Nepal, and as an advocate for the Supreme Court of Nepal. In 2014, he hosted Naya Sambidhan (New Constitution), a weekly talk show on Kantipur Television.

He worked as an attorney general at Office of the Attorney General of Nepal from 18 April 2016 to 3 August 2016.

He was appointed as a justice of Supreme Court of Nepal on 19 April 2019. In October 2026, WhatsApp messages between Phuyal and Inam Sapkota, a fixer who was charged with money laundering, were made public. Phuyal went on leave in November 2026 following the leaks.
