= International Network for Quality Assurance Agencies in Higher Education =

Coordinating body for third-level education validation

- Type: Nonprofit organization
- Founded: 1991; 35 years ago
- Headquarters: Barcelona, Spain
- Key people: Sussana Karakhanyan (President); Crystal Calarusse (CEO)
- Members: 364 (2017)
- Website: www.inqaahe.org

The International Network for Quality Assurance Agencies in Higher Education (INQAAHE) is an international quality assurance body.

== History ==
The organisation began with only 8 members in 1991, and as of 2022, it has over 280 members.

== Partnerships ==
INQAAHE works closely with national accreditation bodies, including the Council for Higher Education Accreditation in the US, and other coordinating bodies, such as the European Association for Quality Assurance in Higher Education (EQNA) in Europe, and with academicians to control educational quality in around 140 countries, and is headquartered in Barcelona, Spain.

== See also ==
- List of recognized accreditation associations of higher learning
