= Hong Kong Council for Accreditation of Academic and Vocational Qualifications =

- 香港學術及職業資歷評審局
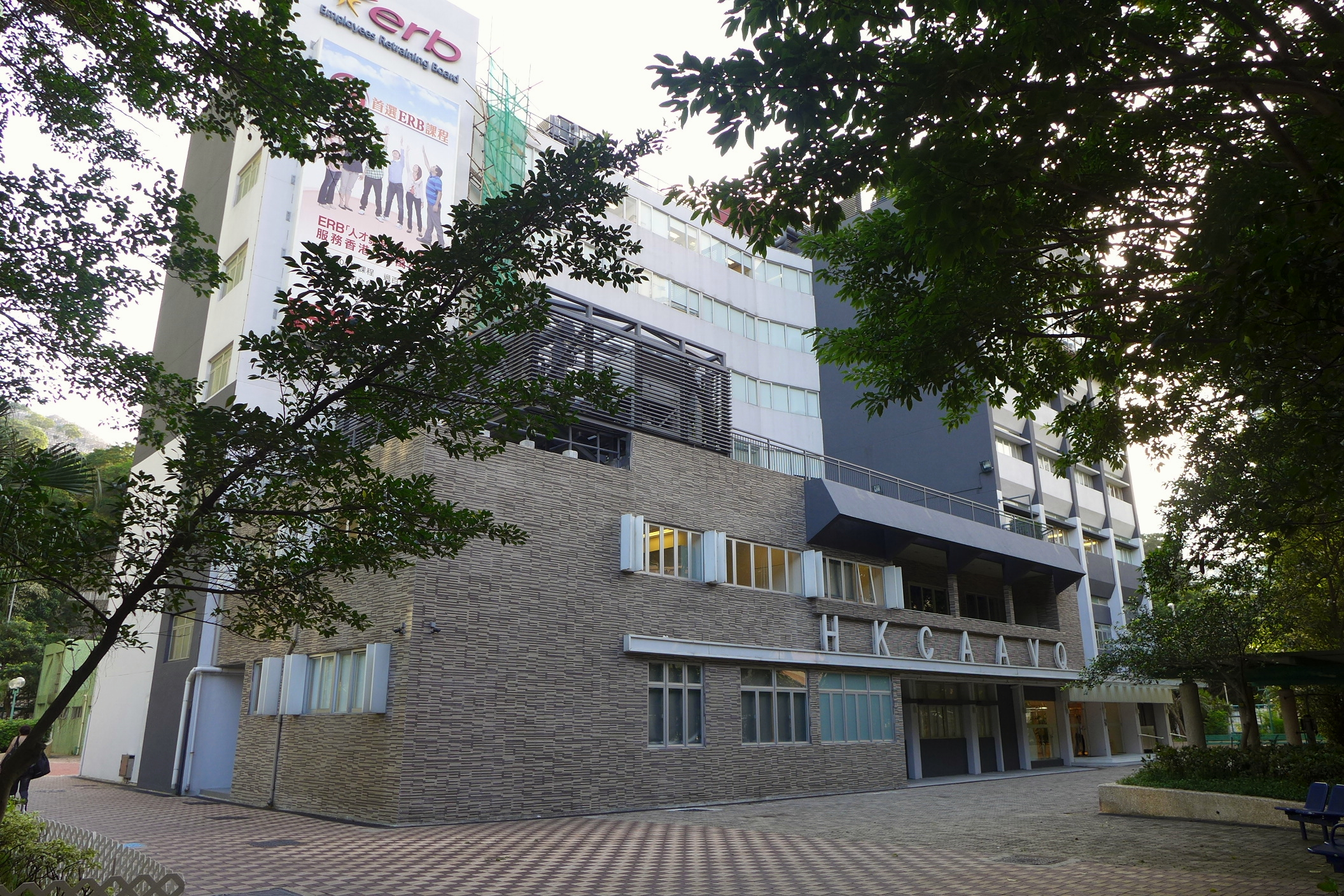
- HKCAAVQ building
- Abbreviation: HKCAAVQ
- Predecessor: Hong Kong Council for Academic Accreditation
- Formation: 1 October 2007; 19 years ago
- Type: Statutory Body
- Headquarters: 10 Siu Sai Wan Road, Chai Wan, Hong Kong
- Chairman: Ir Dr Alex CHAN Siu-kun, BBS
- Vice-chairman: Mr Roger Thomas BEST, JP
- Executive Director: Mr Albert H P CHOW
- Subsidiaries: Qualifications and Accreditation Committee; Finance Committee; Personnel and Administration Committee
- Website: hkcaavq.edu.hk

Hong Kong Council for Accreditation of Academic and Vocational Qualifications
- Traditional Chinese: 香港學術及職業資歷評審局
- Simplified Chinese: 香港学术及职业资历评审局
Transcriptions
Standard Mandarin
- Hanyu Pinyin: Xiānggǎng Xuéshù jí Zhíyè Zīlì Píngshěn Jú
Yue: Cantonese
- Yale Romanization: Hēung góng hohk seuht kahp jīk yihp jī lihk pìhng sám guhk
- Jyutping: Heong1 gong2 hok6 syut6 kap6 zik1 jip6 zi1 lik6 ping4 sam2 guk6

Hong Kong Council for Academic Accreditation
- Traditional Chinese: 香港學術評審局
- Simplified Chinese: 香港学术评审局
Transcriptions
Standard Mandarin
- Hanyu Pinyin: Xiānggǎng Xuéshù Píngshěn Jú
Yue: Cantonese
- Yale Romanization: Hēung góng hohk seuht pìhng sám guhk
- Jyutping: Hoeng1 gong2 hok6 soet6 ping4 sam2 guk6

The Hong Kong Council for Accreditation of Academic and Vocational Qualifications (HKCAAVQ), (formerly the Hong Kong Council for Academic Accreditation) (HKCAA) is a statutory body established under the HKCAAVQ Ordinance (Chapter 1150) which came into effect on 1 October 2007.

== History ==
The Hong Kong Council for Academic Accreditation (HKCAA) was a statutory body established under the HKCAA Ordinance (Chapter 1150) in 1990. During the 1990s, HKCAA conducted accreditation exercises for institutions such as Hong Kong Baptist University, City Polytechnic of Hong Kong, Lingnan University, Open Learning Institute, and the Hong Kong Polytechnic. These institutions were later upgraded as universities in 1994. With the HKCAAVQ Ordinance (Chapter 1150) which came into effect on 1 October 2007, the newly established HKCAAVQ is appointed by the Secretary for Education of Education Bureau as the Accreditation Authority and QR Authority under the Qualifications Framework of Hong Kong (HKQF). In addition to these statutory roles, the HKCAAVQ continues to perform other functions of the former HKCAA in connection with academic and vocational accreditation, education and training and quality assurance.

== Functions under Ordinance ==
Functions of HKCAAVQ were mentioned in its Ordinance, which includes:

1. conduct accreditation in relation to operators, assessment agencies, learning programmes, qualifications and individuals;
2. disseminating information on standards of learning programmes and promoting the methods and practices of conducting accreditation;
3. establishing relationships with accreditation or quality assurance bodies and education and training authorities outside Hong Kong and keeping under review the systems of academic or vocational accreditation in places outside Hong Kong;
4. conducting or commissioning research into the maintenance or monitoring of the standards of education and of training.

== The Council ==
The Council of HKCAAVQ is composed of 15 to 21 Members appointed by the Chief Executive of Hong Kong. The current Chairman of the Council is Ir Dr Alex CHAN Siu-kun, BBS.

== Scope of work ==
=== Academic and Vocational Accreditation ===
The HKCAAVQ provides accreditation services for programme providers upon request. To be accredited, programme providers would have to go through at least both Stage 1 and Stage 2 of HKCAAVQ’s Four-stage Quality Assurance Process:

Stage 1: Initial Evaluation: It assess if operators have the institutional competency to effectively manage and provide adequate resources to the development, delivery, assessment and quality assurance of their learning programmes and educational services.

Stage 2: Programme Validation: It evaluates provider’s programme planning and management, syllabuses, delivery arrangements, assessment methods and learning outcomes to ensure they are appropriate for the qualifications to which they lead.

According to its website, the minimum time required in complete both processes is 16 weeks.

=== Assessment ===
==== Assessment of Non-local Courses ====
The HKCAAVQ is the designated advisor to the Non-local Registry of Courses since 1997. It assessed applications against the registration criteria for courses intending to register under the Non-local Higher and Professional Education (Regulation) Ordinance and gives recommendation to the Registry for final decision.

==== Assessment of Continuing Professional Development Programme (CPD) ====
The HKCAAVQ has been appointed by both the Hong Kong Insurance Authority and the Estate Agents Authority as the assessment authority for their CPD Programme. It assesses whether programme meet specific criteria set by the two authorities. It generally takes one month to process each application.

==== Qualifications Assessment ====
The HKCAAVQ advise whether the totality of the educational qualification(s) of an individual meets the standard of a particular qualification level in Hong Kong by providing qualifications assessment service to both individuals and organizations since the 1990s. The result is however non-binding, as in Hong Kong, it is a matter of discretion for individual employers, organisations, or education institutions to recognise or accept the qualifications of candidates for employment, registration or study purposes. It generally takes 15 working days to process each application and costs HK$2,950 - HK$3,505.

A new policy on qualifications assessment took effect on 1 November 2008 to align the outcome-based educational philosophy underpinning the HKQF and international practice.

==== Assessment of Continuing Education Fund (CEF) Reimbursable Course ====
In June 2002, the Government set up the CEF to subsidize those with learning aspirations to continuous education and training programmes. The aim is to help people pursue continuous learning, thereby preparing Hong Kong's workforce for the knowledge-based economy. Eligible applicants will be reimbursed 80% of their fees, subject to a maximum sum of $10,000, on successful completion of a reimbursable course.

Commencing from 5 May 2008, all new CEF courses will have to undergo a formal accreditation exercise conducted by HKCAAVQ and be registered under the Qualifications Register (QR) before their registration under the CEF.

== International Liaison ==
The HKCAAVQ is one of the founding members of the International Network for Quality Assurance Agencies in Higher Education (INQAAHE), the first international network on quality assurance in higher education established in 1991, and has been a member of it since then. The HKCAAVQ was also one of the two coordinating bodies for the setting up of the Asia-Pacific Quality Network when it was first created in Hong Kong in 2003.

HKCAAVQ has also been maintaining close contact with various quality assurance bodies around the world, such as the Shanghai Educational Evaluation Institute of China, the Australian Tertiary Education Quality and Standards Agency, the Quality Assurance Agency for Higher Education of the United Kingdom and Quality and Qualifications Ireland.

HKCAAVQ is a member of the Asia Pacific Quality Network and an affiliate of the European Association for Quality Assurance in Higher Education (EQNA).

== See also ==
- Higher education in Hong Kong
- Educational accreditation
