= Supreme Court Bar Association (Nepal) =

Bar Association

- Formation: 19 February 1974; 52 years ago
- Type: Bar association
- Headquarters: Kathmandu, Nepal
- Region served: Nepal
- Official language: Nepali
- President: Purnman Shakya
- Affiliations: Nepal Bar Association
- Website: supremecourtbar.org.np

The Supreme Court Bar Association (SCBA) is a Nepali bar association, comprising the practising lawyers of the Supreme Court of Nepal. Senior Advocate Megha Raj Pokharel is the current president of the association and Advocate Raman Kumar Karna is the secretary.

== Notable Persons ==
- Late Daman Nath Dhungana, Former Speaker
- Late Subas Chandra Nemwang, former chairman of Constituent Assembly
- Prakash Man Singh Raut, Chief Justice of Supreme Court of Nepal
