= Nepal Ayurvedic Medical Council =

Nepali regulatory body for Ayurvedic medicine

- Abbreviation: NAMC
- Formation: 1988
- Headquarters: Kathmandu
- Leader: Dr. Santosh Kumar Thakur, Chairperson; Dr. Nirmal Bhusal, Registrar
- Main organ: Council
- Affiliations: Government of Nepal

The Nepal Ayurvedic Medical Council (NAMC) is a statutory body for establishing uniform and high standards of Ayurvedic medical education in Nepal. Ayurveda is a system of medicine with historical roots in ancient Hindu Culture. The modern practices Ayurvedic Medicine derived from Ayurveda traditions are a type of complementary or alternative medicine.

NAMC was established in 1988 under Nepal Ayurveda Medical Council Act of 1988. The Council grants recognition of medical qualifications, gives accreditation to c medical schools, grants registration to medical practitioners, and monitors medical practice in Nepal.

Currently the council has 11 recognized colleges throughout Nepal which teach the courses like Bachelor of Ayurvedic Medicine and Surgery (BAMS), MD Ayurveda, PCL in Ayurveda and General Medicine, TSLC in Ayurveda etc.

NAMC is one of many statutory bodies related to Healthcare in Nepal. Other are Nepal Medical Council, Nepal Nursing Council (NNC), Nepal Alternative Medical Development Council (NAMDC), Nepal Pharmacy Council, Nepal Health Professional Council, Nepal Health Research Council.

== See also ==
- Nepal Medical Council
- Nepal Nursing Council (NNC)
