= Council for the Accreditation of Educator Preparation =

American nonprofit organization

- Formation: 2013
- Headquarters: Washington, DC
- Location: United States
- President: Christopher A. Koch
- Website: caepnet.org

The Council for the Accreditation of Educator Preparation (CAEP) is a professional accreditor focused on accrediting teacher education programs in U.S. colleges and universities. It was founded in 2013 as a result of the merger of two predecessor organizations, the Teacher Education Accreditation Council (TEAC) and the National Council for Accreditation of Teacher Education (NCATE).

According to its mission statement, "CAEP advances equity and excellence in educator preparation through evidence-based accreditation that assures quality and supports continuous improvement to strengthen P-12 student learning."

== History ==
In 1954, the National Council for Accreditation of Teacher Education (NCATE) was founded as a non-profit, non-governmental accrediting body. In 1997, Teacher Education Accreditation Council (TEAC) was founded and dedicated to improving academic degree programs for professional educators, defined as those who teach and lead in schools pre-K through grade 12.

Beginning in 2009, leaders from the two organizations began discussions about merging the two organizations to create a new accrediting body, which would become known as the Council for the Accreditation of Educator Preparation. By 2012, Ohio had become the first state to sign a partnership agreement with CAEP as the new educator preparation accrediting body. CAEP became fully operational as sole accrediting body for educator preparation providers in 2013, and it was recognized by the Council for Higher Education Accreditation in 2014. Beginning in 2016, the legacy accreditation standards of NCATE and TEAC were no longer used.

== Description ==
From the beginning, CAEP staked out a position of imposing tougher standards for accreditation of teacher colleges than had been expected under the prior organizations. The council's new performance standards were created following a multi-year effort involving a diverse group of education professionals. Inside Higher Ed noted that: "In pushing a reform-minded agenda, the accreditor has long stirred criticism from the main organization representing teacher ed programs (the American Association of Colleges for Teacher Education) and from unions that represent teachers, even as they have formally endorsed its existence and mission." Achievement of these high standards is difficult, leading some schools to petition their states to bypass the CAEP accreditation.

In 2017, another accreditor for teacher education programs was created, the Association for Advancing Quality in Educator Preparation (AAQEP).

Schools accredited by CAEP may lose their accreditation status if they fall out of compliance with CAEP reporting and quality standards. Schools that are already CAEP accredited may qualify for the Frank Murray Leadership Recognition for Continuous Improvement, which is awarded to schools deemed to have shown leadership in continuous improvement in their teaching programs.

== Leadership ==
The founding leader of CAEP was James Cibulka, who had previously been president of NCATE and dean of the College of Education at the University of Kentucky.

In 2015, Cibulka was replaced by former Illinois state superintendent of education, Dr. Christopher Koch, who was then vice chair of the CAEP board. Koch remains president of CAEP as of 2026.
