= Nepal Engineering Council =

Autonomous government body in Nepal

- नेपाल इन्जिनियरिङ परिषद
- Logo of Nepal Engineering Council
- Formation: March 11, 1999; 27 years ago
- Founder: His Majesty's Government of Nepal
- Type: Government
- Purpose: Regulation of engineering practice in Nepal
- Headquarters: Minbhawan, Kathmandu
- Coordinates: 27.6875209°N 85.3403958°E
- Website: https://nec.gov.np/

Nepal Engineering Council (NEC) is an autonomous government body formed on 11 March 1999 under The Nepal Engineering Council Act. The council was established in order to mobilize the engineering profession in a systematic and scientific manner by making it effective, as well as to make provision for, among other matters, the registration of the names of engineers as per their qualifications.

The council used to register engineers based on academic certificates until 2022. An amendment bill was registered in the parliament in June 2019 and was passed in August 2022 which makes mandatory to take exams from the council to get license. As of 2022, there are 37 engineering field for which license are issued.

== Councilors ==
Nepal Engineering Council has 21 Councilors as follows:

1. 1 engineer with at least fifteen years of experience in the engineering profession after obtaining a bachelor's degree in engineering, appointed by the Government of Nepal as the Chief Engineer – Chairperson.
2. 1 engineer with at least ten years of experience in the engineering profession after obtaining a bachelor's degree in engineering, appointed by the Government of Nepal as the Chief Engineer – Vice-Chairperson.
3. 7 engineers with at least 7 years of experience in the engineering profession after obtaining a bachelor's degree in engineering, representing each province, nominated by the Government of Nepal based on inclusivity principles, including at least three women – Seven Members.
4. President of the Nepal Engineers' Association – Member.
5. 5 engineers elected by the Nepal Engineers' Association – Members.
6. 1 representative from the Chief Engineers of Engineering Campuses, appointed by the Government of Nepal – Member.
7. 1 representative from the Institute of Engineering, Tribhuvan University – Member.
8. 1 individual from universities conducting engineering education and research, appointed by the Government of Nepal – Member.
9. 2 engineers, including at least 1 woman, with at least 7 years of experience in the engineering profession after obtaining a bachelor's degree, nominated by the committee – Members.
10. Registrar – Member Secretary.

== Jurisdiction of Council ==
- Licensing (Registration) of Engineers
- Accreditation of certificates of academic qualifications
- Recognition of the academic institutions
- Professional code of conduct

== Registration Category ==
The council has provision to register Engineers in three categories:

1. General Engineer ( Category - A )
2. Professional Engineer ( Category - B )
3. Foreign Engineer ( Category - C )

== See also ==
- Nepal Bar Council
- Nepal Medical Council
