= Nepal Bar Association =

Parent bar association in Nepal

- Company type: Public
- Founder: Dev Nath Burma
- Headquarters: Ram Shah Path, Kathmandu, Nepal
- Services: Membership, Public Relationship, Government Relation, Conferences
- Website: nepalbarassociation.org.np

The Nepal Bar Association (NBA) is the parent bar association of all the bar units throughout Nepal.

Established in 1956, Nepal Bar Association has been fundamental in the development of the legal field in Nepal. It has played a vital role in the bar and bench relation, independence of judiciary, human rights, people's movements and the overall development of the legal field in Nepal.

== Executive Committee ==
=== Present members ===
Nepal Bar Association
Name of the Member	Position
President	Senior Adv. prof. Dr.Bijay Prasad Mishra
Vice-President	Adv.Padam Prasad Limbu ( Koshi Province )
Vice-President	Adv.Ajay Shankar Jha ( Madhesh Province )
Vice-President	Adv.Tej Bahadur Rawal ( Bagmati Province )
Vice-President	Adv.Bhupendra Khanal ( Gandaki Province )
Vice-President	Adv.Krishna Prasad Pokharel ( Lumbini Province )
Vice-President	Adv.Biwas Kumar Basnet ( Karnali Province )
Vice-President	Adv.Siddha Raj Ojha ( Sudurpashchim Province )
Vice-President	Adv.Saraswati Shrestha ( Female )
General Secretary	Senior Adv. Kedar Prasad Koirala
Treasurer	Senior Adv. Jagat Bahadur Karki
Members
Members	Senior Adv. Rajkumar Shrestha
Members	Adv. Mangal Sundar Shilpakar
Members	Adv. Kiran Neupane
Members	Adv. Sharada Gurung
Members	Adv. Daman Bahadur Chand
Members	Adv. Baburam Aryal
Members	Adv. Suryakumar Yadav
Members	Adv. Dr. Mukunda Adhikari
Members	Adv. Ranjita Karki
Members	Adv. Madhav Mainali
Members	Adv. Rinku Kumari Yadav
Members	Adv. Kiran Poudel
Members	Adv. Indira Acharya
Members	Adv. Chiranjivi Tilkyani

== See also ==
- Nepal Bar Council
