= Supreme Court of Nepal =

Highest court in Nepal

The Supreme Court of Nepal
- नेपालको सर्वोच्च अदालत

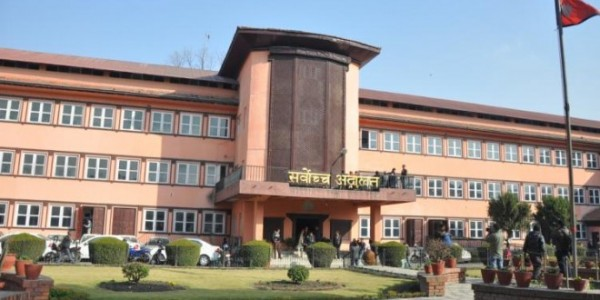
- Interactive map of The Supreme Court of Nepal
- 27.697°N 85.322°E
- Established: 21 May 1956
- Jurisdiction: Nepal
- Location: Ram Shah Path, Kathmandu, Nepal
- Coordinates: 27.697°N 85.322°E
- Composition method: Presidential nomination with Parliament confirmation
- Authorised by: Constitution of Nepal
- Appeals to: Presidential for clemency or commutation of sentence
- Judge term length: 65 years of age
- Number of positions: 1 Chief Justice + 20 permanent judges
- Website: supremecourt.gov.np

Chief Justice
- Currently: Manoj Kumar Sharma
- Since: 19 May 2026

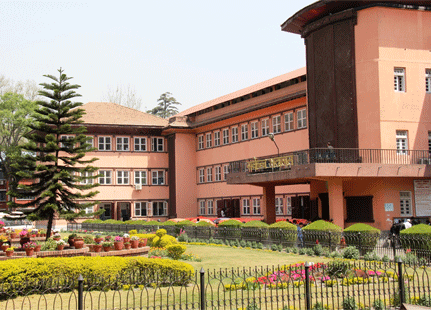
Nepalese Supreme Court Building

The Supreme Court of Nepal (Nepali: नेपालको सर्वोच्च अदालत, romanized: Nēpālakō sarvōcca adālata) is the highest court in Nepal. It is designated as the court of record by the Constitution of Nepal. It has appellate jurisdiction over decisions of the seven High Courts (including eleven Benches of the High Courts) and extraordinary original jurisdiction. The court consists of twenty judges and a chief justice.

== Composition ==
The Supreme Court is composed of a Chief Justice and twenty Judges (Justice). The Supreme Court was formed in 2013 BS (1956 AD). The first Chief Justice of Nepal was Hari Prasad Pradhan.

Judges of the Supreme Court hold their office till the age of sixty-five. They may be removed through an Impeachment (motion) passed by a two-third majority of the House of Representatives on the ground of incompetence, bad moral conduct or dishonesty. The Chief Justice and the Justices may resign from office at any time by submitting resignation to the President.

Judges of the Supreme Court are appointed by the President of Nepal on the recommendation of the Judicial Council. Justices of the Supreme Court are appointed from among the judges who have worked for seven years as judges of the High Courts, or Gazetted first-class officer of Judicial Service for minimum 12 years or have worked as any Senior Advocate or Advocate with minimum practicing experience of fifteen years, or a distinguished jurist who has worked for minimum 15 years in the judicial or legal field.

The Chief Justice is appointed by the President on the recommendation of the Constitutional Council. The Chief Justice must have at least three years of service as a Supreme Court justice.

The administrative head of the Supreme Court is the Chief Registrar. In addition to the Chief Registrar, one Registrar, and four Joint-Registrar are appointed to lead different departments of the Supreme Court and offer administrative assistance to the Court. Officers of the Supreme Court are appointed by the Government of Nepal under the recommendation of the Judicial Service Commission.

== Powers and functions ==
The Supreme Court has both judicial and extrajudicial powers. The judicial powers include the power of hearing the writ petitions, the power of hearing appeal, the power of reviewing its own judgments, the power to revise the judgments delivered by the Court of Appeal and the power to try certain cases (as specified by law). The Supreme Court also has power of making rules, administration of all the Court of Appeal and all the District Courts, formulating policies and programs regarding judicial administration, managerial reforms in various courts, and the publication and dissemination of the Supreme Court decisions.

=== Judicial powers ===
==== Power of hearing writ petitions ====
The Supreme Court is the guardian of the Constitution. Basically, it is responsible for protecting human rights of the people. Legal and judicial remedies against the violation of the fundamental rights are provided under the original writ jurisdiction of the Supreme Court. The writ jurisdiction is commonly known as extraordinary jurisdiction of the Court.

Article 133 of the Constitution has empowered the Supreme Court to issue writs (applicable to the respective issues) such as the writs of habeas corpus, mandamus, certiorari, quo warranto, and prohibition. The writs are issued particularly in the following conditions:

- If any illegal restriction is made against the fundamental rights of the people.
- If any legal remedy is not available under any law or the remedy available under the law is inadequate or ineffective.
- If any issue relating to public rights or interest requires constitutional or legal resolution.

==== Power to decide the constitutionality of the law ====
Article 133(1) of the constitution confers power upon the Supreme Court to declare void either ab initio or from the date of its decision any statutory provision on the ground of inconsistency with the constitution or unreasonable restriction on the enjoyments of the fundamental rights of the citizen

==== Power of hearing appeal ====
Article 133 (4) of the Constitution has given the power to hear appeals (as specified by the law) against the final decisions of the Court of Appeal. According to section 9 of the Administration of Justice Act, 1991 the following cases fall under the appellate jurisdiction of the Supreme Court.

- Cases decided by the Court of Appeal under their original jurisdiction.
- If the Court of Appeal overrules the decision of the District Court with a substantially different effect.
- Cases in which more than 10 years of imprisonment was imposed by a subordinate court.
- Cases referred to the Supreme Court by the Court of Appeal (i.e. in cases of sentencing for life imprisonment or life imprisonment with confiscation of properties).

==== Power to review its own judgments ====
Article 133 (4) of the Constitution has given the power to review its own judgments as specified by the law. According to section 11 of the Administration of Justice Act, 1991 judgments delivered by the Supreme Court may be reviewed on any of the following grounds:

- If any new evidence which could make a substantial difference to the decision is found after the delivery of judgment.
- If the decision is found contrary to the precedent or legal principle established by the Supreme Court.

==== Power to revise the decisions of the Court of Appeal ====
Under section 12 of the Administration of Justice Act, 1991 the Supreme Court has power to revise the final decisions (which are non-appeal-able) of the Court of Appeal on the following grounds:

- In case there is a serious error in the interpretation of any provision of the Constitution or any other law.
- In case the decision is made in contrary to the precedents or it has been misinterpreted.
- If public (right of) property was affected due to misinterpretation of evidence (in the process of formulating decision).
- If the substantive difference in the judgment is deemed to have occurred due to the absence of proper legal representation, in a case where a party is a minor or woman or old or disabled or mentally incapacitated person.

==== Power to try certain cases ====
In accordance with Article 133 (4) of the Constitution and section 7 of the Supreme Court Act, the Supreme Court could try certain cases. Exceptionally this power is limited to hear the cases relating to contempt of the Supreme Court and its subordinate courts. Article 102(3) and s.7(1) of the Supreme Court Act 1991 has provided that the authority to penalize wrongdoers with an amount of up to NRs. 10,000 or imprisonment of maximum period of one year or both if the court finds an accused is in contempt.

=== Benches ===
The judicial power of the Supreme Court is used through the composition of the various types of Benches. They are called as Single Bench, Division Bench, Full Bench, and Special Bench.

==== Constitutional Bench ====
The Constitutional Bench is composed of Chief Justice and four other justices appointed by the Chief Justice on the recommendation of the Judicial Council as per article 137 of the Constitution of Nepal. The bench hears disputes relating to jurisdiction between the Federation and a State, between States, between a state and a local level, and between local levels; and disputes relating to election to members of the Federal Parliament or State Assembly and matters relating to disqualification of a member of the Federal Parliament or of the State Assembly. Any case sub judice in the Supreme Court involves a question of serious constitutional interpretation, the Chief Justice may appoint such case to be tried by the Bench.

==== Full Bench ====
The Full Bench is composed of three or more justices. The jurisdiction of the full bench is to render the final decision upon the cases which have not unanimity in the decision of the division bench or the cases which is referred to the full bench because of presence of serious issue of interpretation of law or legal principles by division bench or by the Chief Justice. The chief justice may refer any cases to the full bench if he thinks the case is fit to be heard by the full bench. The provision relating to 'Full Bench' is given in Supreme Court Regulation, 2074, Section 23.

==== Division Bench ====
The Bench composed by two justices is called division bench. Most of the cases run through this bench. The jurisdiction of this bench is to hear the appeal filed after the decision of the Court of Appeal, to hear the writ petition registered under the Article 133(2) of the Constitution, to make review of its own judgments and to make revision of the decision of the court of Appeal as specified by the law.

==== Single Bench ====
The Single Bench is formed of a single justice. Prima facie hearing of the writ petition, petition filed against the interim and interlocutory order of the inferior court, petition against the order of the Registrar concerning procedure of the cases and any other application which does not fall under the jurisdiction of the special, full or division bench falls under the jurisdiction of the single bench.

=== Extra-judicial powers ===
==== Power of making rules ====
The Supreme Court has the power to make rules on the procedural, managerial and administrative functions of the Supreme Court, the Court of Appeal and the District Courts. Section 11 of the Supreme Court Act, 1991 has authorized the Supreme Court to make rules relating to the Supreme Court, while section 31 of the Administration of Justice Act has empowered the Supreme Court to make rules relating to the Court of Appeal and the District Courts. Under the said statutory authority the Supreme Court has issued the Supreme Court Rules and Court of Appeal Rules in 1991 and the District Court Rules in 1995. Rulemaking power is exercised by the Full Authorization of the Supreme Court.

==== Power to formulate judicial policies ====
The Full Court is the principal policy-making body of the Nepalese judiciary which consist of all the justices of the Supreme Court. On many occasions the Supreme Court has formulated policies and developed plans and programmes towards judicial reforms and court management system. Besides, the Chief Justice and the Registrar have also a key role in formulating judicial policies.

=== Full Court ===
The Full Court is commonly known as the meeting of all the justices present including the Chief Justice. It is a high-level policy-making body of the judiciary. The Full Court is basically responsible for the formulation of policies relating judicial administration. Policy decisions formulated by the Full Court are basically carried out by the Registrar (ex-officio secretary of the Full Court) of the Supreme Court. Major functions of the Full Court are as follows:

- To recommend new legislation relating to the administration of justice and any amendment or change required in such law.
- To consider the policy issues relating to administration of justice and court management.
- To approve the annual report of the Supreme Court.
- To award the title of Senior Advocate.
- To consider on matters referred to the Full Court either by the Chief Justice or any of the Justices.

=== Other committees of the Supreme Court ===
The Supreme Court has other different committees which are constituted by the Supreme Court Procedure Rule. Likewise, the Chief Justice has the power to constitute other appropriate committees. Main objective of these committees is to make policy on court management matter and advice to the Chief Justice.

== Strategic plan of the Nepalese judiciary ==
Nepalese Judiciary had second five-year strategic plan (2009–2013). This strategic plan was adopted by the full court of the Supreme Court. The Strategic Plan has defined the vision, mission, values, and core functions of the Nepalese judiciary, which are as follows:

Vision

To establish a system of justice that is independent, competent, inexpensive, speedy, and easily accessible to the public and worthy of public trust and thereby to transform the concept of the rule of law and human rights into a living reality and thus ensure justice to all.

Mission

To impart fair and impartial justice in accordance with the provisions of the Constitution, the laws, and the recognized principles of justice.

Values

Allegiance to the Constitution, independence and autonomy, duty towards society, accessibility of justice, competent justice, high-ethical standard, representation, inclusiveness, and ownership.

Core functions

Adjudication, execution of judgment, supervision, and monitoring

The plan has projected twelve areas of strategic intervention which are as follows:

1. To reform case management process so as to make adjudication process effective.
2. To make execution of judgment simple, speedy and effective.
3. To develop human resources.
4. To develop infrastructure of court and manage logistics.
5. To institutionalize the application of information and media technology.
6. To strengthen inspection and supervision system.
7. Reform in security management.
8. To preserve the values of judicial independence, accountability, and autonomy.
9. To institutionalize research regarding adjudication, justice system and judicial reform.
10. To strengthen and institutionalize relation with stakeholders of the justice sector.
11. Increase access to justice and increase public trust.
12. To strengthen institutional capacity of courts and tribunals.

== See also ==
- List of sitting judges of the Supreme Court of Nepal
- Supreme Court Bar Association (Nepal)
