= Shree Durbar =

Coordinates: 27.677968°N 85.319761°E

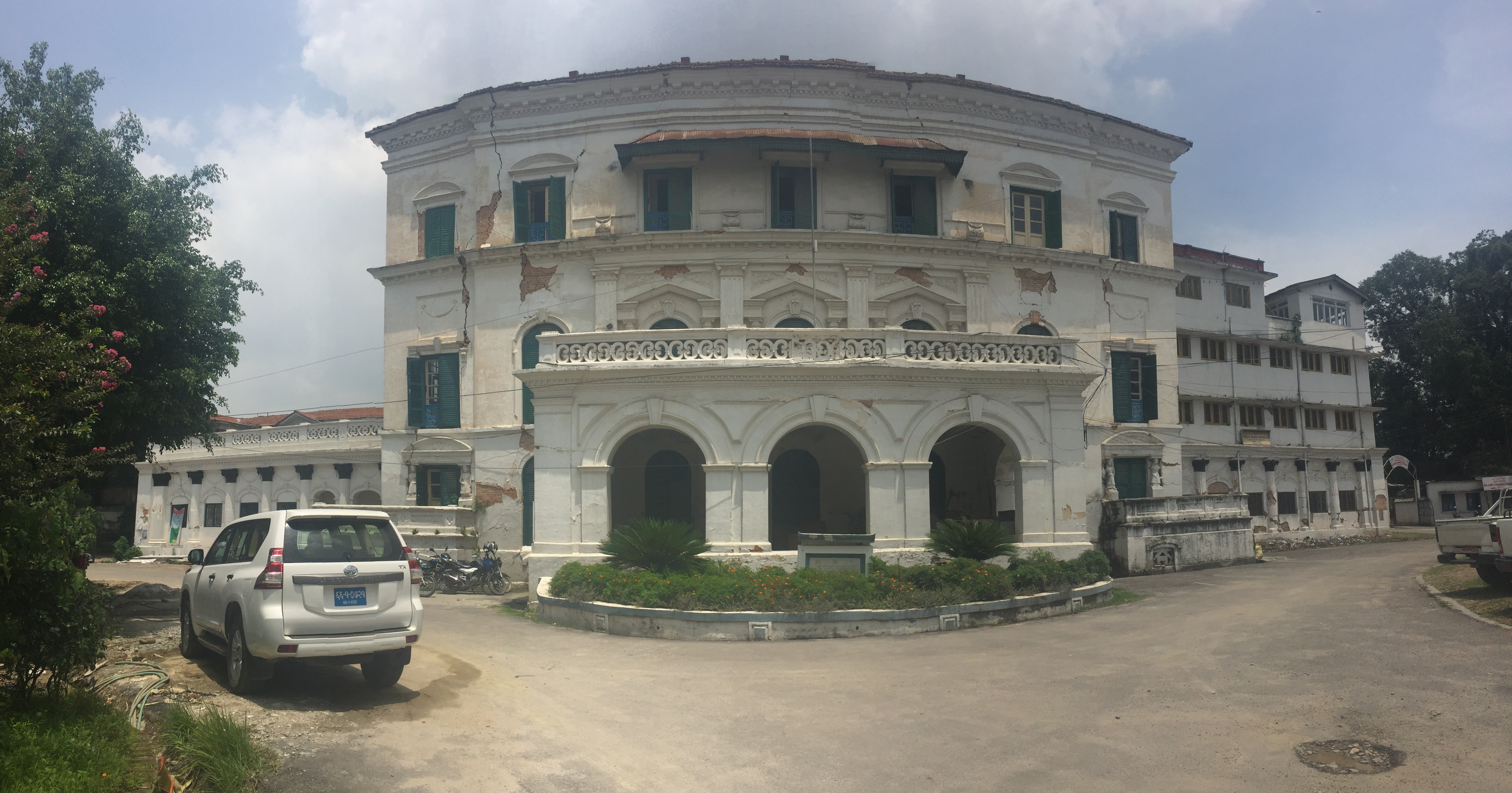

General information
- Architectural style: Fusion of Neoclassical architecture, Mughal, European styles of architecture
- Location: Kathmandu, Patan, Nepal, Nepal
- Construction started: 1927
- Cost: Unknown
- Client: Chandra Shumsher JBR

Technical details
- Structural system: Brick and Mortar
- Size: 140 ropanis

Design and construction
- Architects: Kumar Narsingh Rana, Kishor Narsingh Rana

Shree Durbar (aka Shri Durbar) is a Rana palace in Kathmandu, Patan, Nepal the capital of Nepal. The palace complex is located east of the Lazimpat Durbar next to Patan Dhoka and was built by Chandra Shumsher JBR in 1927.

== History ==
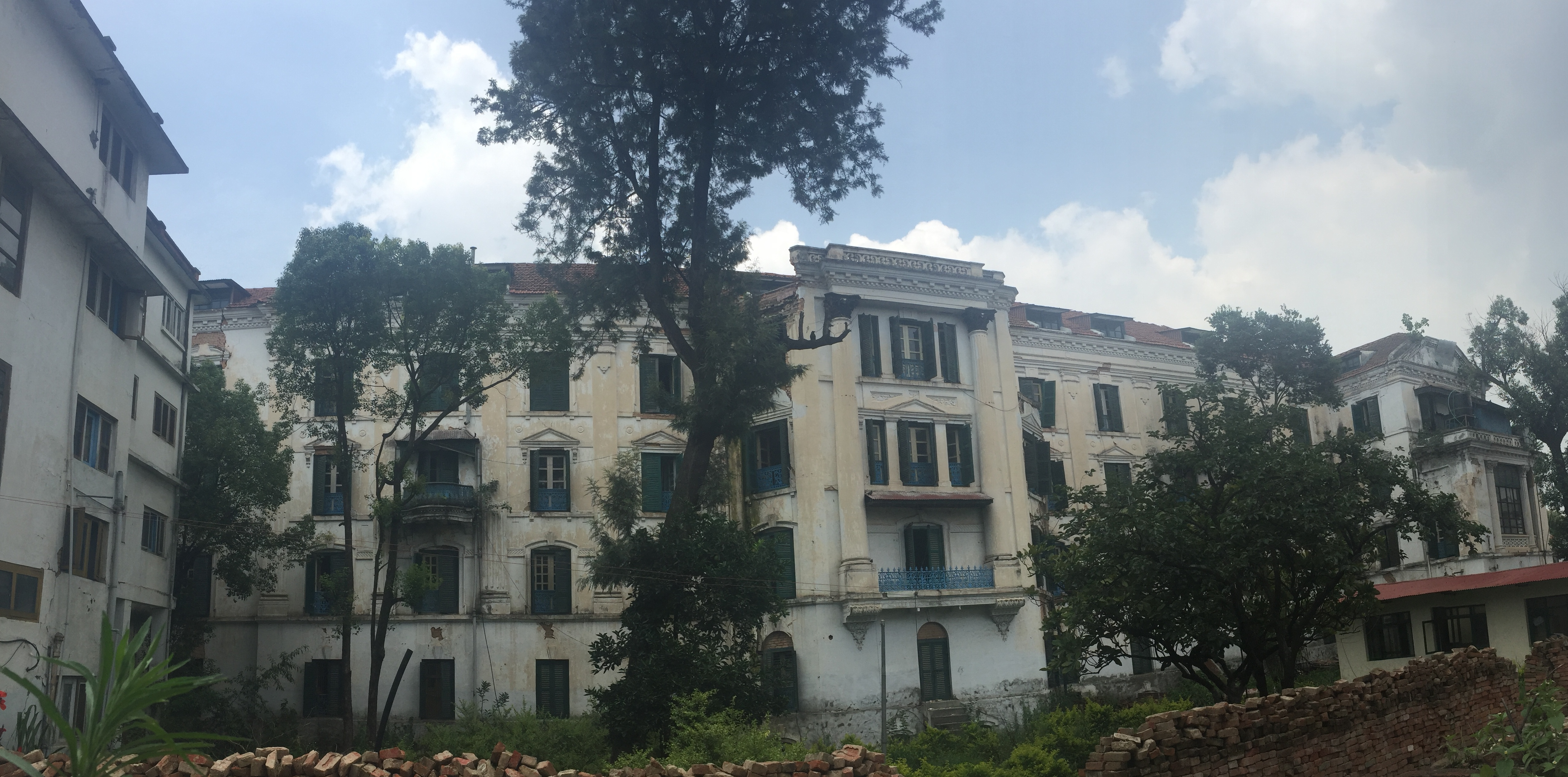
Side view of Shree durbar, Patan, Nepal

== Current status ==
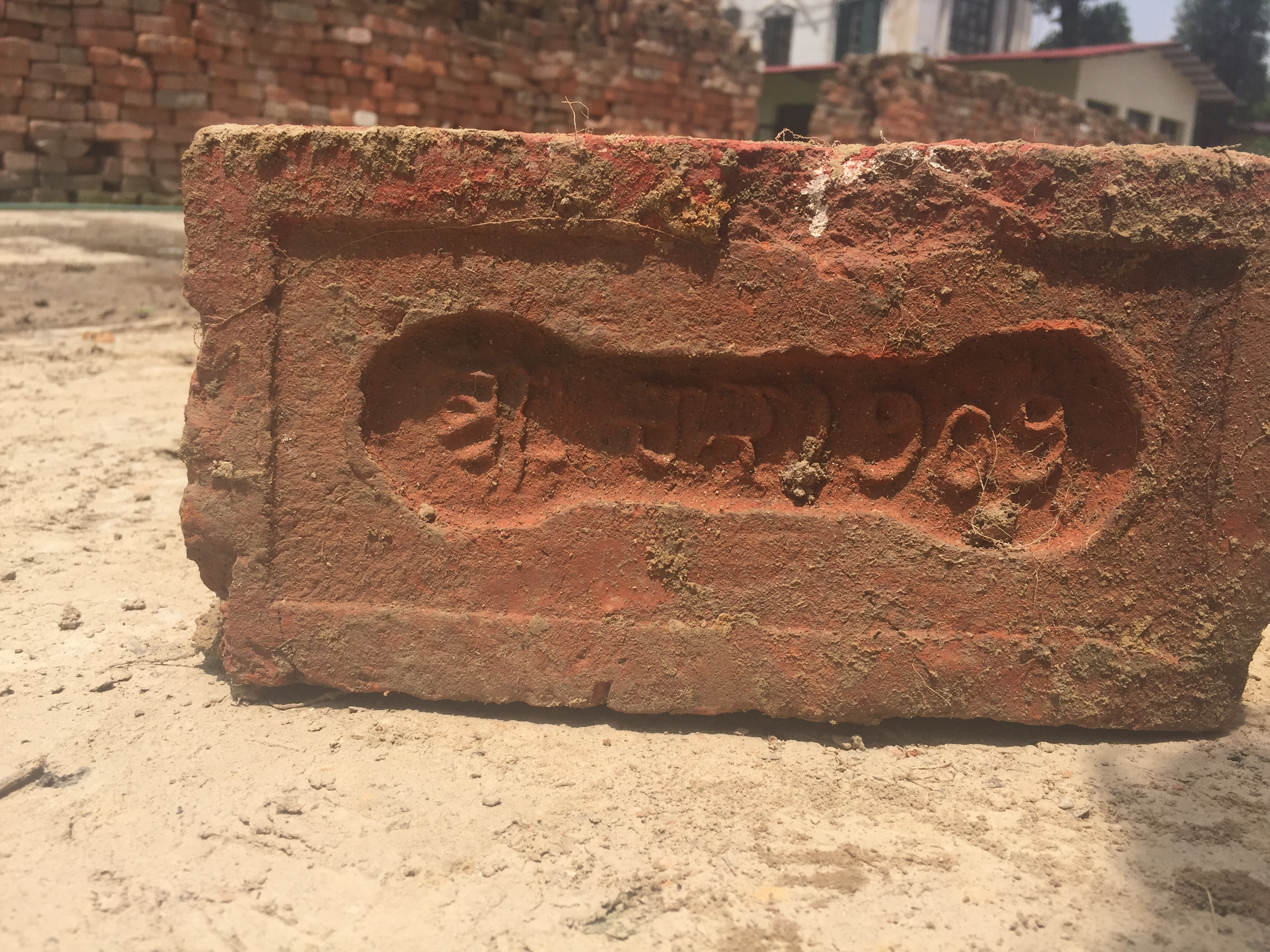
Brick of Shree Durbar saying " Shree 3 Chandra 1909 " probably the leftovers of singha Durbar

Various parts of the estate were sold, donated, or given as alms by Jagadamba Kumari Devi. The main building is occupied by descendants of Madan Shumsher JBR, with the remaining compound turned into a neighborhood of Sri Durbar Tole along with Madan Puraskar Pustakalaya.

== See also ==
- Rana palaces of Nepal
- Madan Puraskar Pustakalaya
- Jagadamba Kumari Devi
