= Jagadamba Nepali Dharmashala =

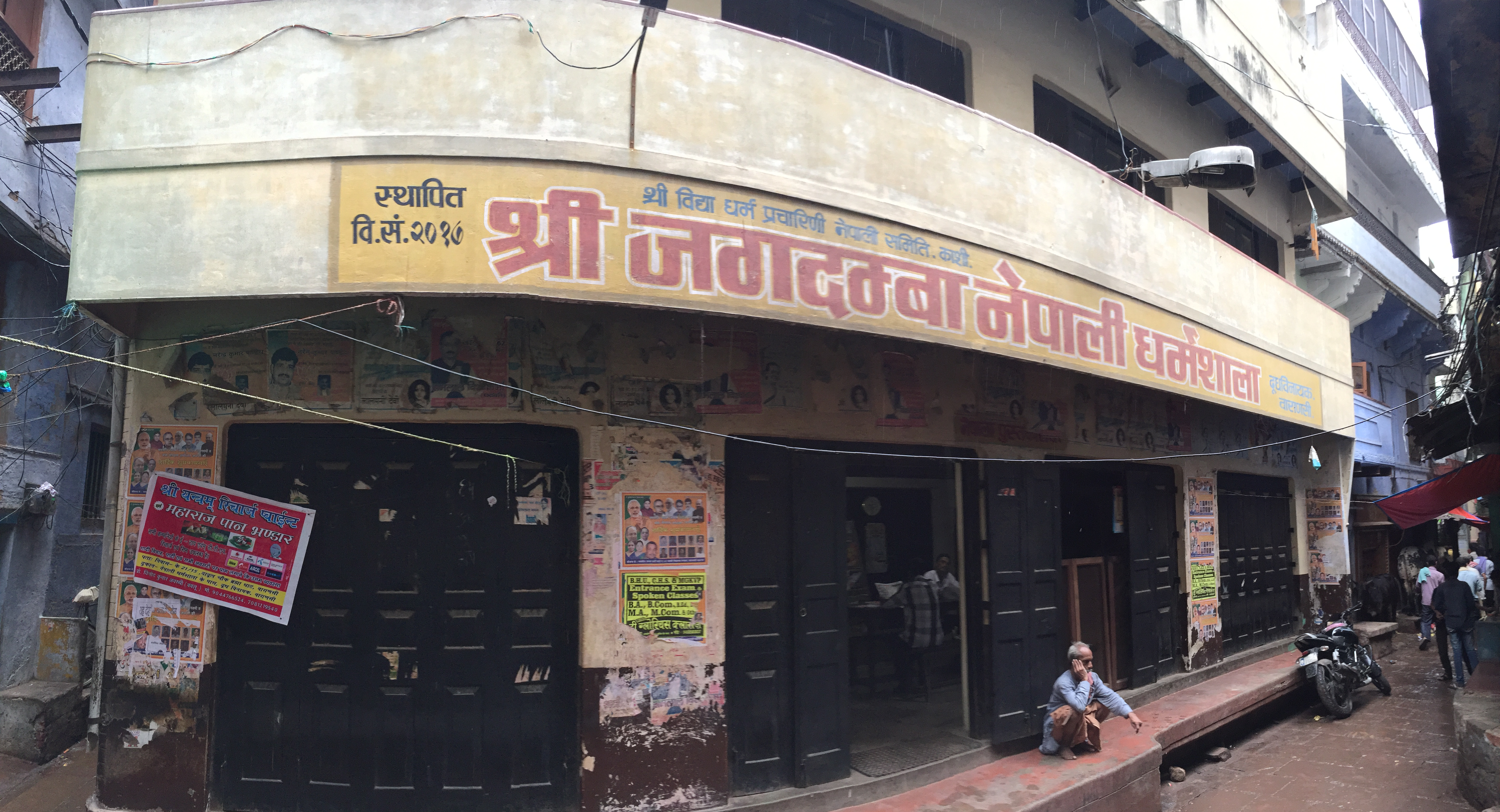
- Interactive map of the Jagadamba Nepali Dharmashala area

General information
- Architectural style: Choultry
- Location: Varanasi, Uttar Pradesh, India
- Coordinates: 25.315774°N 83.016676°E
- Completed: 1960
- Client: Jagadamba Kumari Devi

Technical details
- Structural system: Brick and Mortar

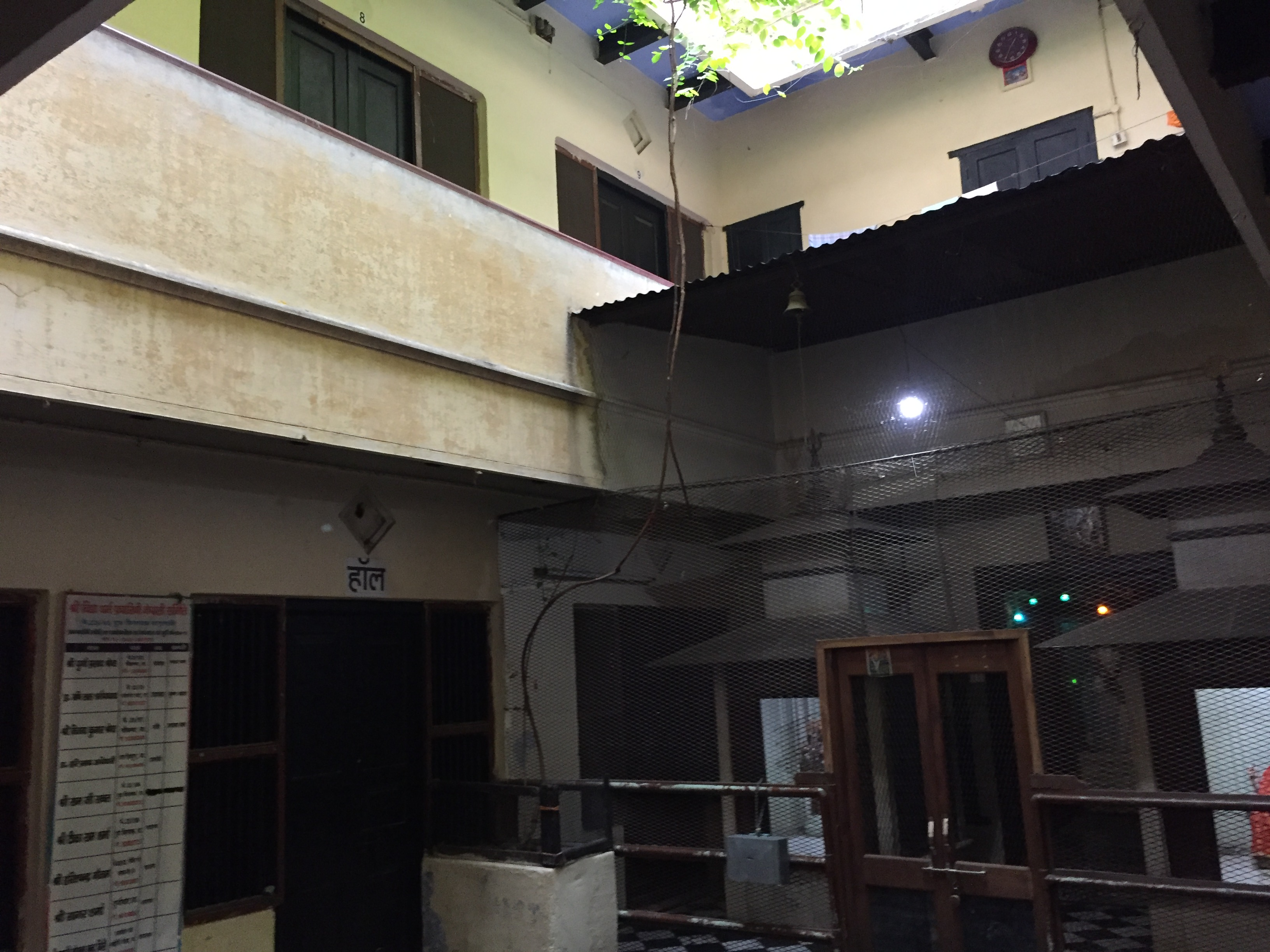
Inside view of Jagadumba Nepali Dharamshala Varanasi Setup by Rani Jagadamba Kumari Devi for Nepali in 1960

Jagadamba Nepali Dharamshala (Nepali: जगदम्बा नेपाली धर्मशाला) is a Nepali Dharamshala (religious rest house) in Varanasi, India. Established in 1960 (2017 BS) by a single donation of Rani Jagadamba Kumari Devi, wife of Lt.-Gen. Madan Shumsher JBR. It is currently run by Vidya Dharma Pracharini Nepali Samiti, a committee made up of Nepali people living in Varanasi.

== Nepala Library ==
The Nepala Library is a small library within the dharamshala, mostly consisting of religious texts and Nepali, Hindi, and Sanskrit literature.

== Gallery ==
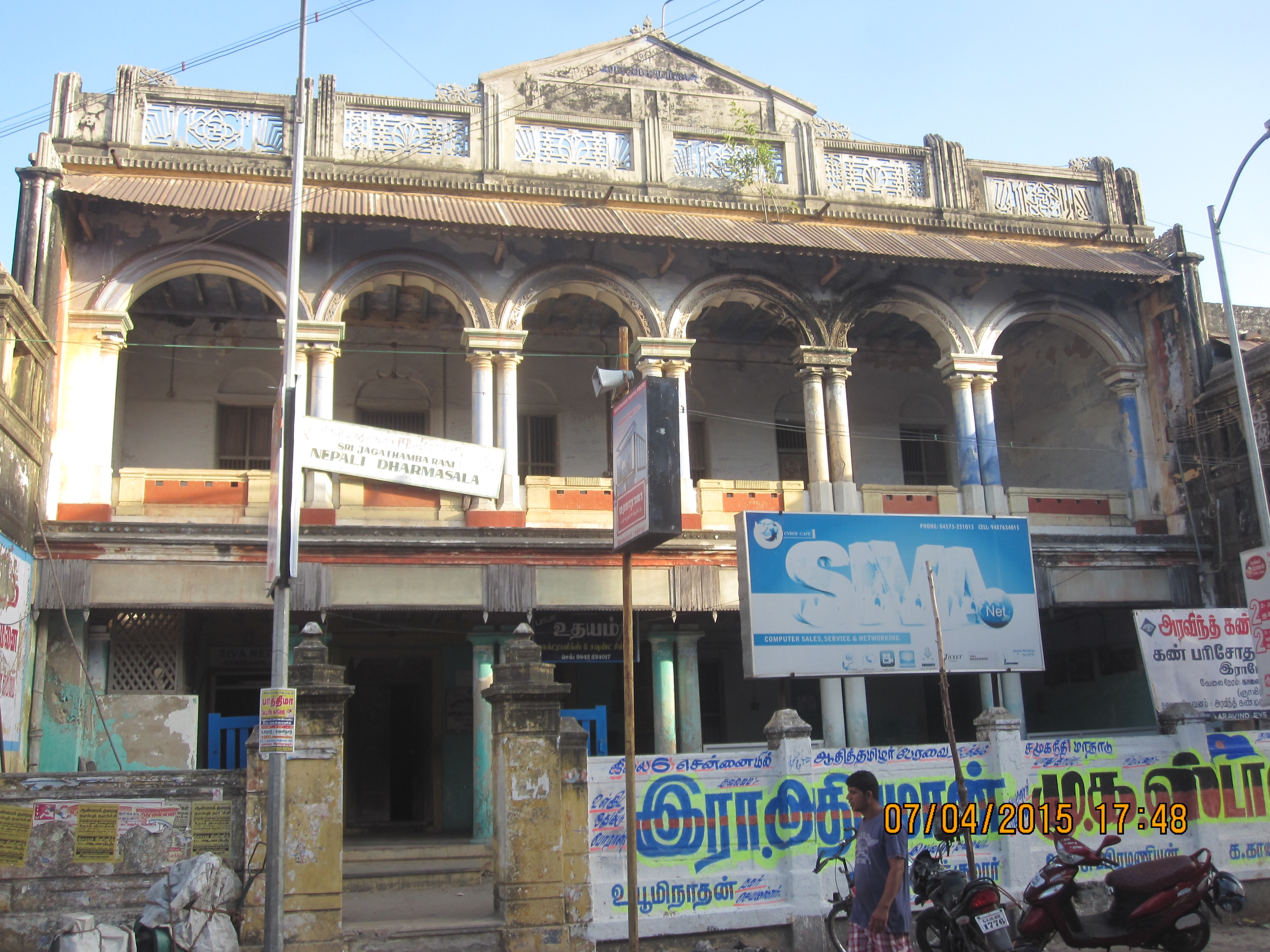
Jagadamba Nepali Dharamshala, Rameswaram Established for Nepali in 1959

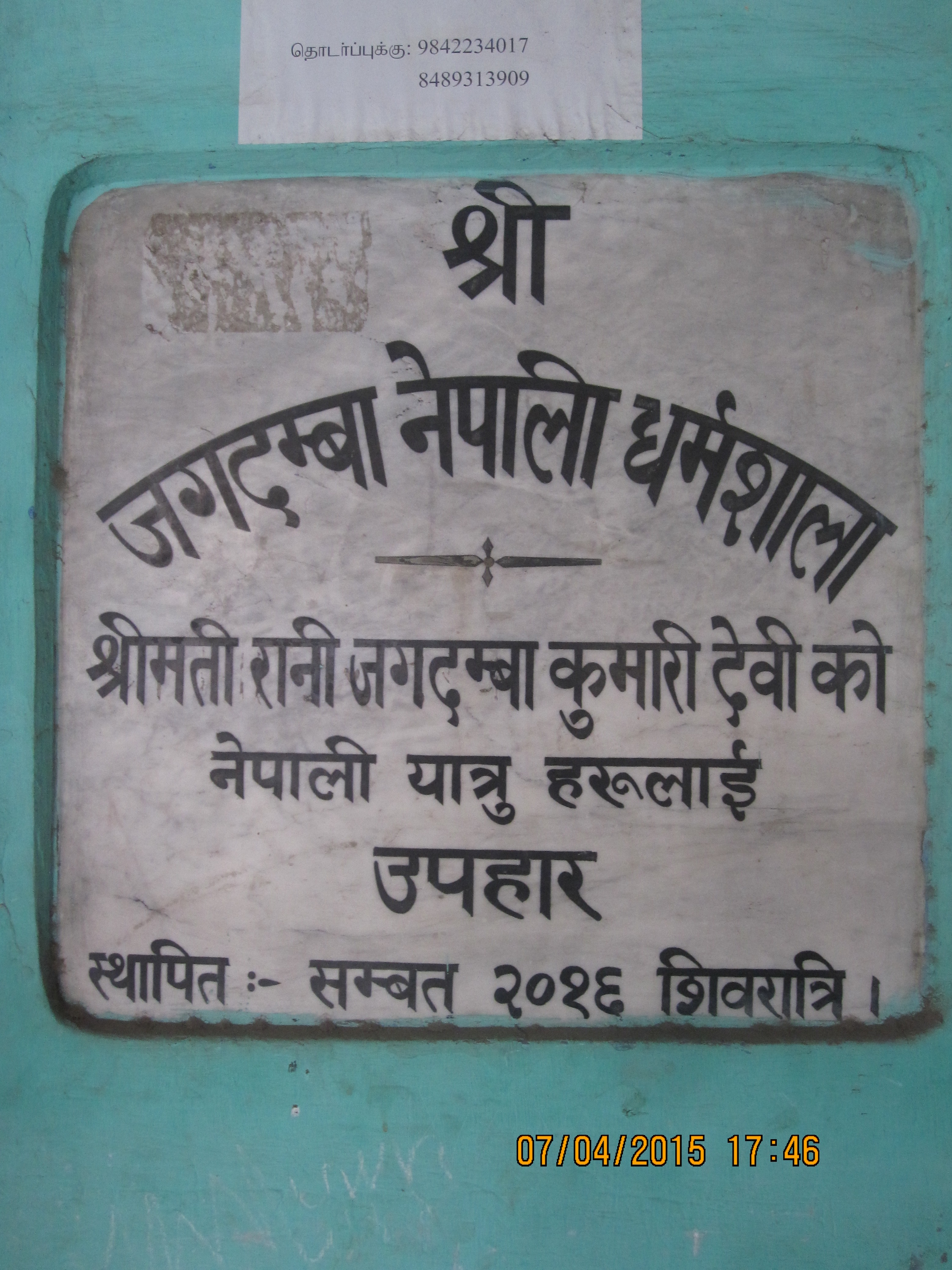
Marble Plaque at Jagadamba Nepali Dharamshala, Rameswaram translates as "A gift from queen Jagadamba Kumari Devi for Nepali Travelers, Established at Rameswaram in Maha Shivaratri 2016 BS (1959 CE)"

== See also ==
- Jagadamba Kumari Devi
- Vidya Dharma Pracharini Nepali Samiti
