= Kanak Mani Dixit =

Nepali publisher, editor and writer

- कनकमणि दीक्षित
- Born: 27 January 1956 (age 70); Lalitpur, Nepal
- Education: Columbia University
- Occupations: Journalist, author
- Website: kanakmanidixit.com

Kanak Mani Dixit (born 27 January 1956) is a Nepali publisher, editor and writer. He is the founder of the magazine Himal Southasian and cofounder of Himal Media.

== Life ==
Dixit was born in Lalitpur. He studied at the Tri Chandra College in Kathmandu and obtained there his Bachelor of Arts in 1975. He studied at the University of Delhi, where he obtained a Bachelor of Laws. Afterwards he studied at the Columbia University, where he obtained two Master's degrees, one in 1981 in international relations and one year later one in Journalism.

He worked for eight years from 1982 until 1990 at the secretariat of the United Nations in New York City. In 1987, he founded the bimonthly magazine Himal which subsequently became Himal Southasian. He is also the author of children's books and the founder of Film South Asia (FSA), a film festival for documentary films. He also works in spinal injury rehabilitation, public transportation, archiving, and architectural and environmental preservation. He was honored with a Prince Claus Award from the Netherlands in 2009.

== Controversy ==
In August 2013, Royal Norwegian Embassy, Kathmandu, Nepal awarded NOK 3892000 (NRs 60 Million) to The Southasia Trust, where Kanak Mani Dixit is an Executive Director, to use "Media to Promote Regional Peace and Development". Maoist lawmaker Shakti Basnet accused Mr. Dixit of misusing granted fund to campaign against the ongoing peace process and using funds without accountability, triggering a debate on the support of foreign diplomatic missions for Nepali media. Dixit refuted the accusations, claiming that the Maoist lawmaker in question was misusing his parliamentary platform to damage his credibility through personal targeting.

A team of police deployed by the Commission for the Investigation of Abuse of Authority (CIAA) on April 22, 2016, took journalist Kanak Mani Dixit into custody. Around 20 police personnel including those in civvies held him from Patan Dhoka in Lalitpur district. In a statement on Friday, the CIAA said Dixit was arrested according to CIAA Act 2048 (1991) Section 19.1 (c) for his defiance and non-cooperation in its investigation despite repeated notice to appear before the commission. The anti-graft body said the property details submitted by Dixit on January 24, 2016, didn't match with the various documents provided by various concerned bodies after its enquiry. The CIAA said it has been investigating complaints against Dixit that he illegally transferred the property owned by deceased Lt.-Gen.Madan Shumsher JBR and his wife Jagadamba Kumari Devi to his name by abusing his public post.

Kanak Mani Dixit had publicly opposed the appointment of Lok Man Singh Karki to the head of the CIAA in 2013 on the grounds that Mr. Karki had been indicted by the Rayamajhi Commission for the suppression of the People's Movement of 2006 Numerous journalists from a variety of publications and political leanings have pointed out that Dixit's arrest is a clear case of vendetta by Lok Man Singh Karki.

== Arrest ==
On April 22, 2016, the Commission for the Investigation of Abuse of Authority (CIAA) ordered the arrest of Mr Kanak Mani Dixit. "Kanak Mani Dixit's arrest is a worrying development and a setback for freedom of expression in Nepal", said Evelyn Balais-Serrano, Executive Director of the Asian Forum for Human Rights and Development. "The manner and timing of his arrest seems to indicate this is a case of personal vendetta and intimidation tactics." The International Federation of Journalists said: “The arrest of Kanak Mani Dixit raises serious concerns for the state of freedom of expression in Nepal. The circumstances of Dixit's arrest are questionable, raising questions about proper judicial procedure. The IFJ urges the Government of Nepal to immediately release Dixit and conduct a transparent investigation into the arrest and the CIAA's allegations.” Prominent journalists, activists and scholars from India, Nepal, Bangladesh, the US, Australia, the UK and Sri Lanka, urged the Nepal government to release well-known journalist Kanak Mani Dixit. Journalist William Nicholas Gomes joined a group of prominent journalist and activists calling the immediate release of Kanak Mani Dixit, and he also wrote to Shakti Bahadur Basnet, Home Minister of Nepal, Ministry of Home Affairs, condemning the detention of Dixit and asked to release him.

== Books ==
=== Author ===
Fiction

- The Leech & I, and other stories, Lalitpur : Rato Bangala Kitab, 1998, 83 p. Children's stories, with illustrations by Subhas Rai.
- Adventures of a Nepali Frog, Lalitpur : Rato Bangala Kitab, 2003, 102 p. Children's stories.
- The treaty of Kathmandu, Lalitpur : Rato Bangala Kitab, 2004, 56 p. Children's stories, with art by Santa Hitang.

Essays

- State of Nepal, Lalitpur : Himal Books, 2010, 312 p. Contributed articles on various topics of Nepal edited by Kanak Mani Dixit & Shastri Ramachandaran.
- Peace politics of Nepal : an opinion from within, Lalitpur : Himal Books, 2011, 300 p.

=== Editor ===
- The Southasian Sensibility: A Himal Reader, New Delhi : SAGE Publications, 2012, 336. A collection of some of the best articles published over the past 25 years in Himal Southasian, South Asia's first and foremost regional news and analysis magazine. It includes essays that are fine examples of long-form journalism, a form that Himal has pioneered in South Asia.

== See also ==
- Himal Southasian
- Sajha Yatayat
- Madan Shumsher JBR
- Jagadamba Kumari Devi
