= The Vanished Path =

Indian graphic novel

The Vanished Path: A Graphic Travelogue
- cover of 2015 edition
- Date: March 2015
- Page count: 218 pages
- Publisher: HarperCollins Publishers, India

Creative team
- Writers: Bharath Murthy

Original publication
- Language: English
- ISBN: 978-93-5177-019-0

The Vanished Path: A Graphic Travelogue is an Indian graphic novel written and illustrated by Bharath Murthy, and published in March, 2015, by HarperCollins Publishers India. It is Bharath's first book-length comic.

== Publication history ==
There were two trips to the sites, one lasting a week and the other three weeks. Alka Singh, a filmmaker and photographer, visually documented the journey, while Bharath made notes. The longer trip was funded by the Tamil language Dinamalar newspaper. The plan was to publish a weekly short comic based on the journey in their weekly children's supplement Siruvarmalar. Two issues were published, dated 4 and 11 February 2011, before the series was cancelled. Each issue carried a 10-page episode. Translations of the text were done in-house. Other excerpts were published in Himal Southasian, Fountain Ink, magazine, Live Mint and the self-published Comix.India anthologies.

== Art ==
The black & white artwork and panel layouts invoke narrative techniques characteristic of Japanese manga, as noted by Divya Trivedi in a review in Frontline magazine. Bharath speaks about his interest and conscious borrowing from Japanese manga in an interview in The Comics Journal. The Buddha is represented as a Dharma Wheel, one of the aniconic symbols used to represent the Buddha in Early Buddhist art. Another feature is the use of black & white photographs, some taken by Alka during the journey and others being historical photos of the locations. The final panel image in the book is a close-up photo taken by Alka of the foot of the Bodhi Tree.

== Plot ==
In September 2010, Bharath Murthy and his wife Alka Singh, recent converts to Buddhism, decide to go a pilgrimage to the historical sites related to the life of Siddhartha Gautama, the historical Buddha. Travelling through the archaeological ruins strewn across the Gangetic plains, they rediscover the lost and forgotten Buddhist past of India. The book is divided into six chapters wherein they visit Bodhgaya, Nalanda, Rajgir, Kushinagar, Lumbini, Sarnath and Shravasti. Interspersed between their tour are episodes of the Buddha's life that take place in that location. The author has used the recorded discourses of the Buddha in the Pali Tipitaka as the basis for illustrating these episodes. The book tries to understand the history of Buddhism in India while at the same time taking note of its current status in a country dominated by Hinduism. The protagonists maintain scepticism at some cult-like features they come across as part of the pilgrimage tourism industry. They also encounter ignorance of Buddhist teachings among Indian followers of Buddhism. The topical news events surrounding the Ayodhya dispute forms an important sub-plot as the verdict is announced while they are on the journey. The book ends with the couple reaching Bodhgaya and witnessing the Bodhi Tree.

== Reception ==
The book received broadly favourable reviews. It was nominated for the 2015 Shakti Bhatt First Book Prize, the first comic to receive that honour in the award's history. Prajna Desai, reviewing it for the Caravan magazine said,

"... the virtue of The Vanished Path consists in mobilising the dregs of history, that is, archaeology and little-read texts, to tell a witty and rounded story of the Buddha’s teachings. "

The Outlook Traveller criticised its narrative style as 'bland'. Rakesh Khanna, writing in the Deccan Chronicle, found the narrative 'not carefully planned', yet 'refreshing'. Striptease, an online magazine devoted to comics called it 'a spiritual journey littered with discoveries and evolutions.' In an interview in The Hindu, Bharath says that he wanted to reach out to readers who never read comics, and to those Indians who may not be so aware of their Buddhist past.
