= 2016 in Nepal =

- Decades: 1990s; 2000s; 2010s; 2020s
- See also: Other events of 2016; Timeline of Nepalese history

Events from the year 2016 in Nepal

== Incumbents ==
- President: Bidhya Devi Bhandari
- Vice President: Nanda Kishor Pun
- Prime Minister: Khadga Prasad Oli (until 4 August), Pushpa Kamal Dahal (starting 4 August)

== Events ==
=== January ===
- 4 January - 2016 Imphal Earthquake

=== February ===
- 26 February - 2016 Air Kasthamandap crash

== Deaths ==
- 9 February - Sushil Koirala, former Prime Minister (b. 1939)
- 7 June - Amber Gurung, musician (b. 1938)
- 27 August - Gore Bahadur Khapangi, former Minister (b. 1940)
- 16 September - Madhav Ghimire, former Home Minister and Chief Secretary
- 29 December - Kamal Mani Dixit, litterateur (b. 1929)
