= Sajha Yatayat =

- Founded: March 16, 1962
- Headquarters: Pulchowk, Lalitpur
- Service area: Kathmandu Valley
- Service type: Bus
- Hubs: Pulchowk
- Fleet: 111+
- Fuel type: Diesel and Electric
- Operator: Sajha Yatayat Co-operative Ltd.
- Chief executive: Kanak Mani Dixit
- Website: sajhayatayat.com.np

Sajha Yatayat (Nepali: साझा यातायात) is a public transportation bus system in Nepal serving the capital city of Kathmandu as well as its surrounding valley. Popularly known as Sajha Bus mainly runs bus routes throughout Kathmandu and Lalitpur city. Since 2016 Sajha Yatayat has expanded its network and provides long haul bus service to Baglung, Gorkha, Birgunj and Lumbini.

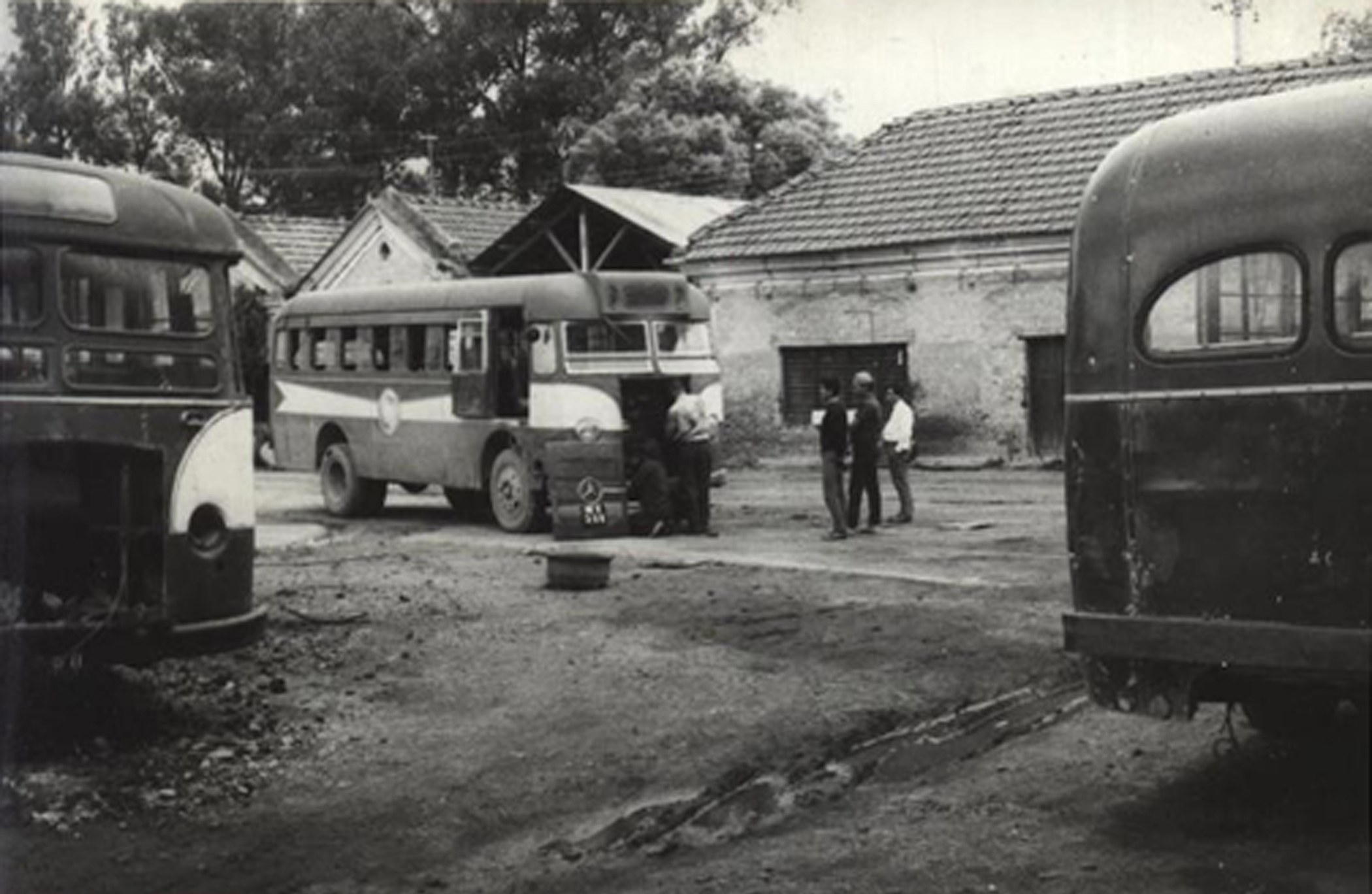
Sajha Yatayat yard in 1965.

== Routes ==
Sajha Yatayat operates the following routes inside Kathmandu Valley:

Line	Terminus	Route	Terminus
1	Lagankhel	Jawalakhel, Pulchowk, Kupondole, Thapathali, Tripureshwor, NAC, Jamal, Lazimpat, Panipokhari, Teaching Hospital, Narayan Gopal Chowk, Samakhusi, Gongabu	New Bus Park
2	Imadole Police Chowki	Krishna Mandir, Ratomakai Chowk, Kist Hospital, Gwarko, BNB Hospital, Satdobato, Lagankhel, Jawalakhel, Pulchowk, Kupondole, Thapahali, Tripureshwor, NAC, Jamal, Lazimpat, Panipokhari, Teaching Hospital, Narayan Gopal Chowk, Sallaghari, Gangalal Hospital, Golfutar, Hattigauda, Chapali Gaun	Narayansthan
3	Ratna Park	Purano Buspark, Shahid Gate, Tripureshwor, Thapathali, Maitighar, Babar Mahal, Baneshwor, Shantinagar, Tinkune, Gairegaun, Sinamangal	Tribhuvan International Airport
4	Ratna Park	Babarmahal, Baneshwor, Tinkune, Koteshwor, Jadibuti, Lokanthali, Gatthaghar, Madhyapur Thimi, Srijananagar, Sallaghari, Suryabinayak, Jagati, Nalinchowk, Fun Valley, Palase	Sanga
5	Swayambhunath	Sitapaila, Bafal, Kalanki, Kalimati, Teku, Tripureshwor, NAC, Ratnapark, Babarmahal, Baneshwor, Tinkune, Koteshwor, Jadibuti, Lokanthali, Gatthaghar, Thimi, Srijananagar, Sallaghari	Suryabinayak
6	Hattiban Kharibot	Hattiban, Khumaltar, Satdobato, Lagankhel, Jawalakhel, Pulchowk, Kupondole, Thapahali, Tripureshwor, NAC, Jamal, Lazimpat, Panipokhari, Teaching Hospital, Narayan Gopal Chowk, Samakhushi	New Bus Park
7	Bugamati	Chyasikot, Sainbu, Bhaisepati, Nakkhu, Ekantakuna Chowk, Jawalakhel, Pulchowk, Kupondole, Thapahali, Tripureshwor, NAC	Ratna Park

Furthermore, there is currently one long haul route:

Terminus	Route	Terminus
Kathmandu	Thankot, Malekhu, Mugling, Pokhara, Kushma	Baglung

Sajha Yatayat Bus stops signs are put at most places. Regular bus stops are also used. In some bus stands, there are no bus stop signs yet due to constructions. Normal frequency of operation is 15 minutes to 25 minutes.

== Electric Bus ==
Sajha Yatayat signed a contract with Chinese Auto Manufacturer CHTC Kinwin for the delivery of 40 electric busses in Oct 09, 2021. Among those, 3 busses were delivered and were operational from July 7, 2022. They are currently running in trial phase and 37 more busses will be delivered soon
