= Vidya Dharma Pracharini Nepali Samiti =

Vidya Dharma Pracharini Nepali Samiti (Nepali: विद्या धर्म प्रचारिणी नेपाली समिति) is a Nepali committee in Varanasi, India. Established for Propagation of Sanatan Dharma and for maintenance of Nepali Dharamshala (type of building), religious rest house in Varanasi and helping awarding education to Nepalis traveling to Vanaras for education. It also awards and auspices Madan Smarak Samman puraskar.

== See also ==
- Jagadamba Nepali Dharmashala
