= Gongabu Bus Park =

Bus station in Kathmandu, Nepal

Gongabu Bus Park नयाँ बसपार्क
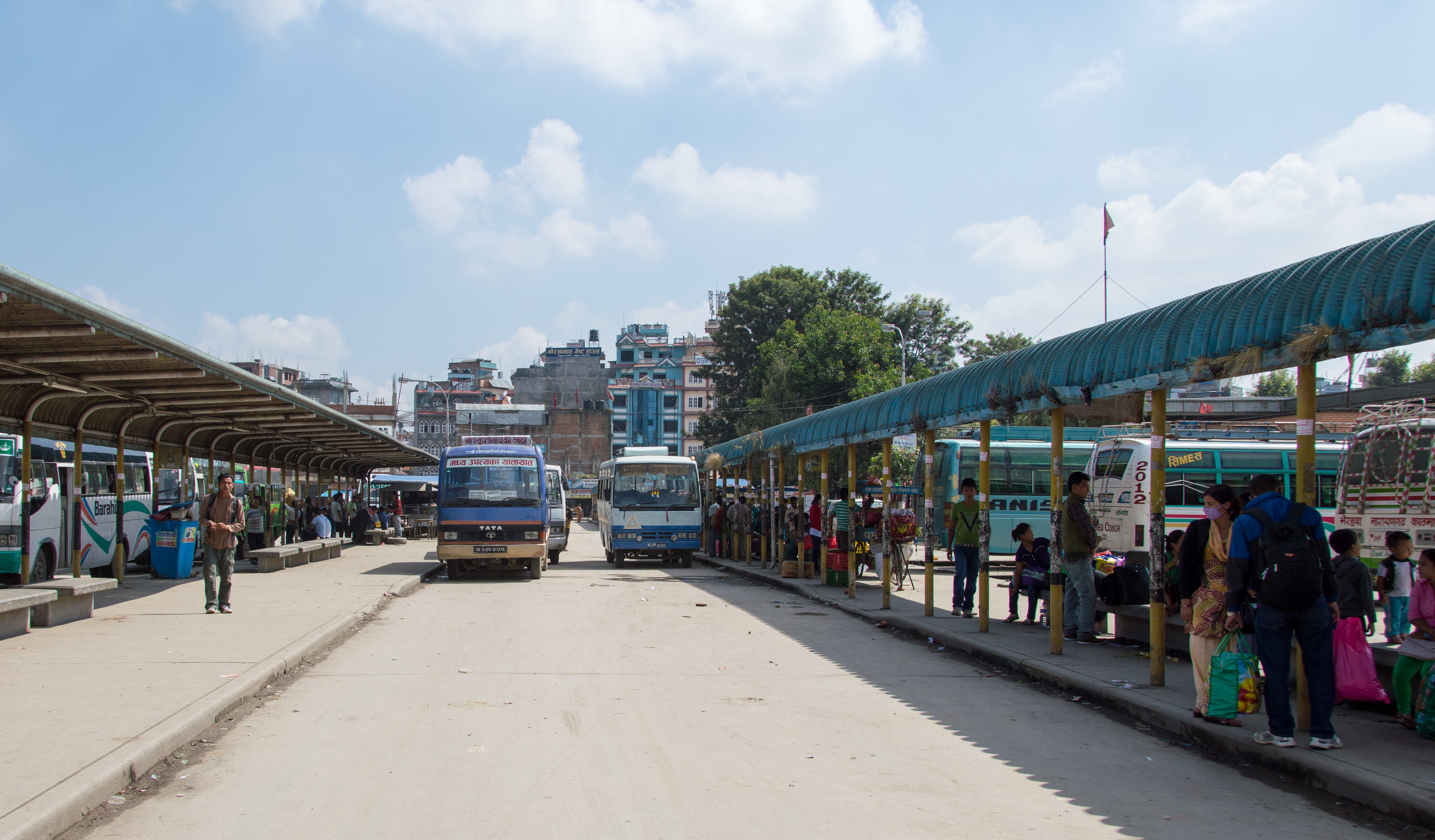
- Gongabu Bus Park

General information
- Location: Kathmandu; Nepal
- Coordinates: 27.7053°N 85.288°E
- Owner: Kathmandu Metropolitan City
- Operator: Lohtse Multi-Cooperatives Pvt. Ltd.

History
- Opened: 1999
Location

Gongabu Bus Park, commonly known as Naya Bus Park (Nepali: नयाँ बसपार्क), is a central bus station located in Gongabu on the North-East corner of Ring Road in Kathmandu, Nepal. It serves as both, a domestic hub as well as a local bus terminus in Northern Kathmandu. Locally, it is served by Sajha Yatayat as well as smaller private operators. It is the biggest and busiest bus station in Nepal connecting the capital city with various regions of Nepal. During peak, around 1500 serve the station on daily basis.

== History ==
The facility was constructed in 1999 in collaboration with JICA based on private-public partnership model.

There have been upgrades to the stations from 2015 to 2017, leading to a capacity increase from 450 to 800 parking spaces.

In 2023, Kathmandu Metropolitan City enforced all long-distance busses from Kathmandu to destinations outside the Kathmandu Valley to be operated from Gongabu Bus Park. For this, 56 new ticket stalls were added to the bus park.

In March 2025, the Bus Park implemented online ticketing across all 47 ticket counters. The system was introduced to improve passenger convenience and streamline operations.

== Controversies ==
The operator of the bus station, Lohtse Multi-Cooperatives Pvt. Ltd., constructed unauthorized business complex inside the station which was against the initial agreement with the city of Kathmandu. In 2009 BS, the agreement was amended to allow such businesses.
