= Kamal Mani Dixit =

Nepalese writer (1929–2016)

Kamal Mani Dixit कमलमणि दीक्षित
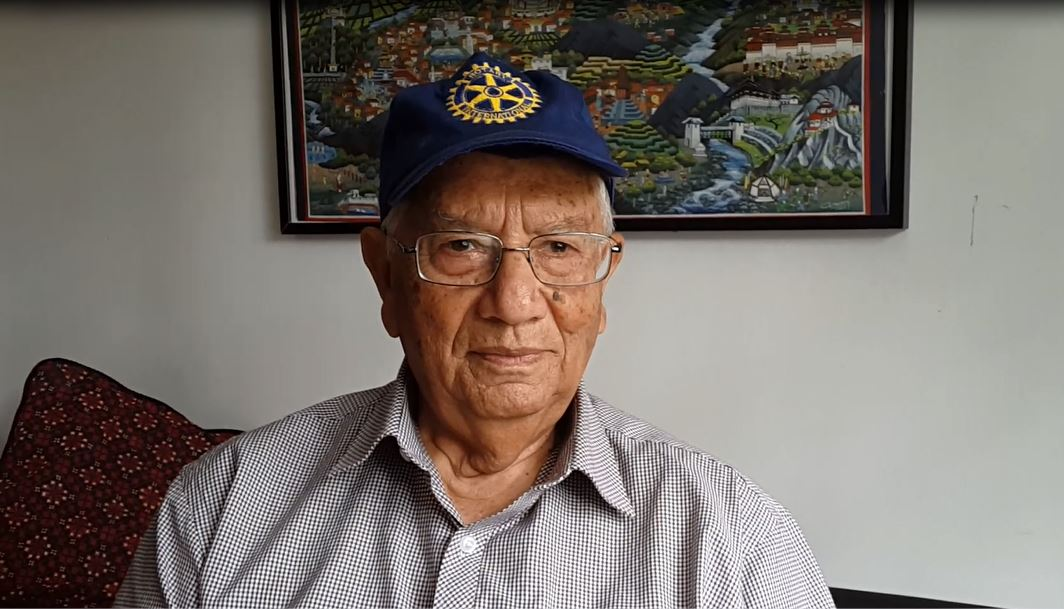
- Dixit in 2016
- Born: 2 September 1929; Gairidhara, Kathmandu, Nepal
- Died: 29 December 2016 (aged 87); Patan, Lalitpur, Nepal
- Education: Durbar High School, Tri-Chandra College, Banaras Hindu University
- Occupations: Author, essayist, archivist, promoter of the Nepali language
- Children: Kunda Dixit, Kanak Mani Dixit, Rupa Dixit Joshi
- Relatives: Madan Mani Dixit
- Writing career
- Pen name: क.दी.
- Language: Nepali
- Website: kamaldixit.com

Kamal Mani Dixit (Nepali: कमलमणि दीक्षित; 2 September 1929 – 29 December 2016) was the founder and chair of the Madan Puraskar Pustakalaya library and the Madan Puraskar award. He was the author of numerous Nepali books and made important contributions to Nepali literature.

== Early life ==
Dixit was born on 2 September 1929 in Gairidhara, Kathmandu, the son of Kedar Mani Dixit and Bidhya Devi Dixit. Dixit attended Durbar High School in Kathmandu. He graduated with a Bachelor of Arts from Banaras Hindu University in India in 1949.

== Personal life ==
He married Anju Paudel in 1949. They have 2 sons and 1 daughter: Kunda Dixit and Kanak Mani Dixit are established journalists of Nepal and daughter Rupa Joshi is also known for her writing.

== Death ==
Dixit died on the morning of Thursday, 29 December 2016 at B&B Hospital, Lalitpur. He had been suffering from respiratory problems for few days. He was cremated at the electronic crematorium at Pashupati Aryaghat on Thursday morning dressed in daura suruwal and Dhaka topi. After his death Rato Bangala School celebrated his death anniversary each year by reciting the different poems he had written.

== See also ==
- Madan Puraskar Pustakalaya
- Madan Puraskar
- Nepali literature
