= NepaLinux =

- Developer: Madan Award Library
- OS family: Linux (Unix-like)
- Working state: Current
- Source model: Open source
- Initial release: 2005; 20 years ago
- Latest release: 3.0 / May 25, 2008; 17 years ago
- Update method: APT
- Package manager: dpkg
- Supported platforms: i386
- Kernel type: Monolithic (Linux)
- Default user interface: GNOME
- Official website: ~~www.nepalinux.org~~

NepaLinux was a Debian and Morphix-based Linux distribution focused on desktop usage in Nepali language computing.

It contains applications for desktop users, such as OpenOffice.org, Nepali GNOME and KDE desktops, Nepali input method editor.

NepaLinux was developed and distributed by Madan Puraskar Pustakalaya. Version 1.0 was produced as part of the PAN Localization Project, with the support of the International Development Research Centre (IDRC) of Canada. NepaLinux is an effort to promote free and open-source software in Nepal.

In October 2007, NepaLinux was the joint recipient of the Association for Progressive Communications' annual APC FOSS prize.
