= Madan Puraskar Pustakalaya =

Library of Nepali Language Books and Periodicals

- मदन पुरस्कार पुस्तकालय
- 27.6779°N 85.3205°E
- Location: Patan Dhoka, Lalitpur, Nepal, Nepal
- Established: 1955

Other information
- Website: madanpuraskar.org

Madan Puraskār Pustakālaya (Nepali: मदन पुरस्कार पुस्तकालय) is a library of books and periodicals in the Nepali language. The library is a not-for-profits and non-governmental institution that is run by a trust. In addition to the archive, the library is involved in many other areas like publishing, educational training and development of information technology in Nepali language. The library also manages Madan Puraskar and Jagadamba Shree Purasakar prizes.

The library is located at Patan Dhoka, Lalitpur, Nepal.

== History ==
The first acquisitions for what was later to become the Madan Puraskar Pustakalaya were made in the mid-1940s by a Kathmandu schoolboy, Kamal Mani Dixit, with pennies that came from his lunch allowance. As the personal collection grew, it attracted gifts in kind from several important literary personalities, statesmen and scholars of Nepal and India.

In 1956, the collection received an endowment from Chandra Shumsher JBR's daughter-in-law Rani Jagadamba Kumari Devi. Madan Puraskar Pustakalaya was officially registered in 1985, under Organizations Registration Act of 1977 of Nepal naming it after late Gen. Madan Shumsher JBR son of Chandra Shumsher JBR and husband of Jagadamba Kumari Devi. Kamal Mani Dixit, the founder of the library, was the chairman of the library until his death.

== Activities ==
=== NepaLinux ===
Madan Puraskar Pustakalaya also releases NepaLinux – a Linux flavor / distribution in the Nepali language. NepaLinux is an effort to promote Free and Open Source Software in Nepal.

=== Prize distribution ===
Madan Puraskar Guthi manages two Nepali literary prizes, the Madan Puraskar and the Jagadamba Shree Purasakar. The prizes are rewarded after "Ghatasthapana" (घटस्थापना).
