= Jagadamba Kumari Devi =

Jagadamba Kumari Devi जगदम्बा कुमारी देवी राणा
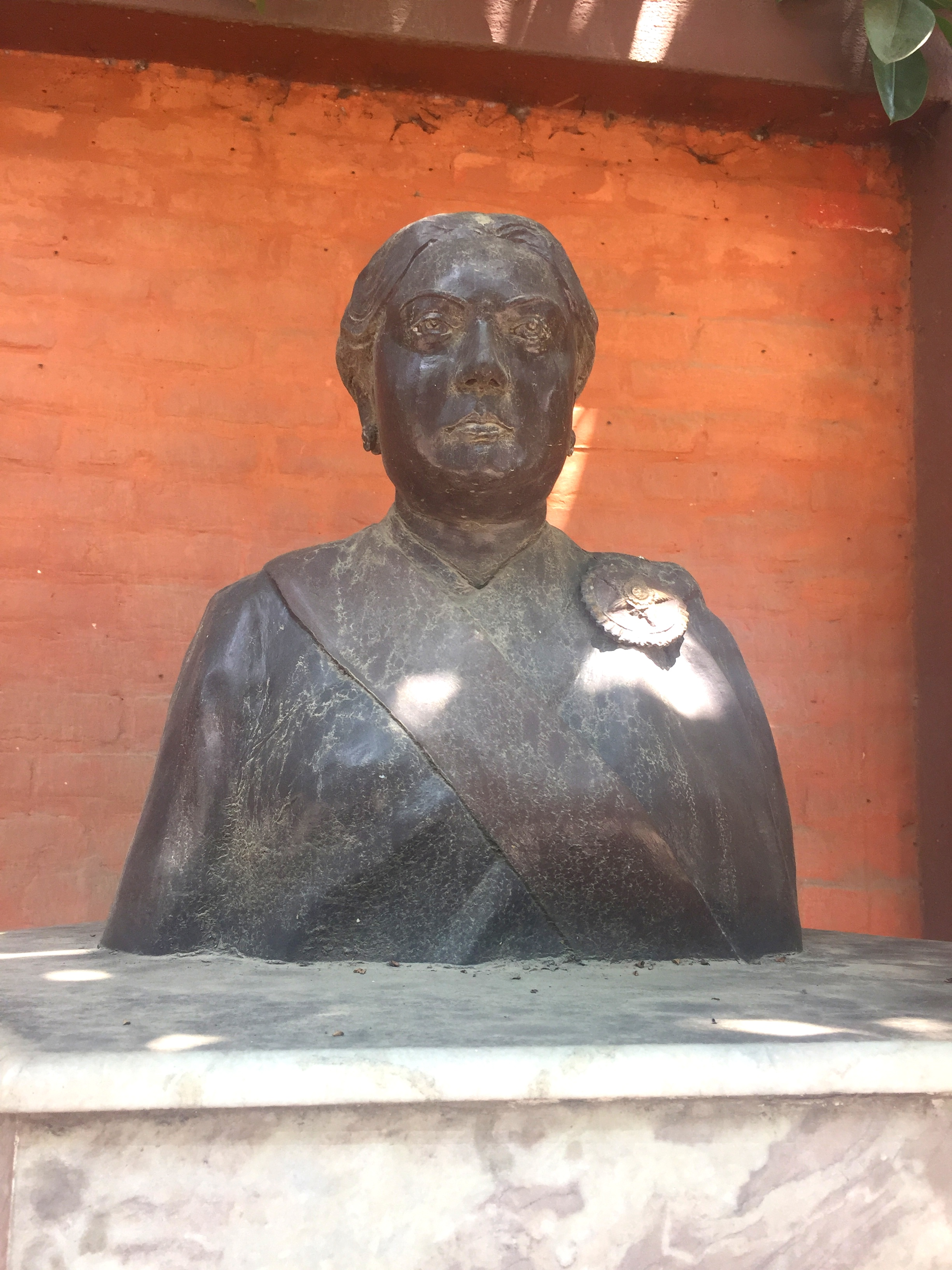
- Born: 1918; Balrampur district, Uttar Pradesh
- Died: 1988 (aged 69–70); Shree Durbar, Kathmandu
- Spouse: Lt.-Gen. Madan Shumsher JBR
Names
- Jagadamba Kumari Devi Rana
- House: Rana dynasty (by marriage)
- Religion: Hinduism

Jagadamba Kumari Devi

Member of Raj Sabaha

Rani Jagadamba Kumari Devi (1918–1988) was the wife of Lt.-Gen.Madan Shumsher JBR, and daughter-in-law of Maharaja Prime Minister Chandra Shumsher JBR. Jagadamba Kumari Devi was born in Balrampur district, Uttar Pradesh. After marriage with Lt.-Gen. Madan Shumsher JBR she moved to Kathmandu and lived in Shree Durbar.

In 1956, she gave an endowment to Madan Puraskar Pustakalaya. She established Jagadamba Databya Aushadhalaya (charitable dispensary) and Madan Dhara Samiti for charitable work. She also donated 22 ropani land of Shree Durbar to Sajha Yatayat's services and for the overall public good. She also established Nepali dharmashalas at Mangalagauri in Varanasi and Rameswaram in the late 1950s to accommodate Nepali pilgrims and travellers.

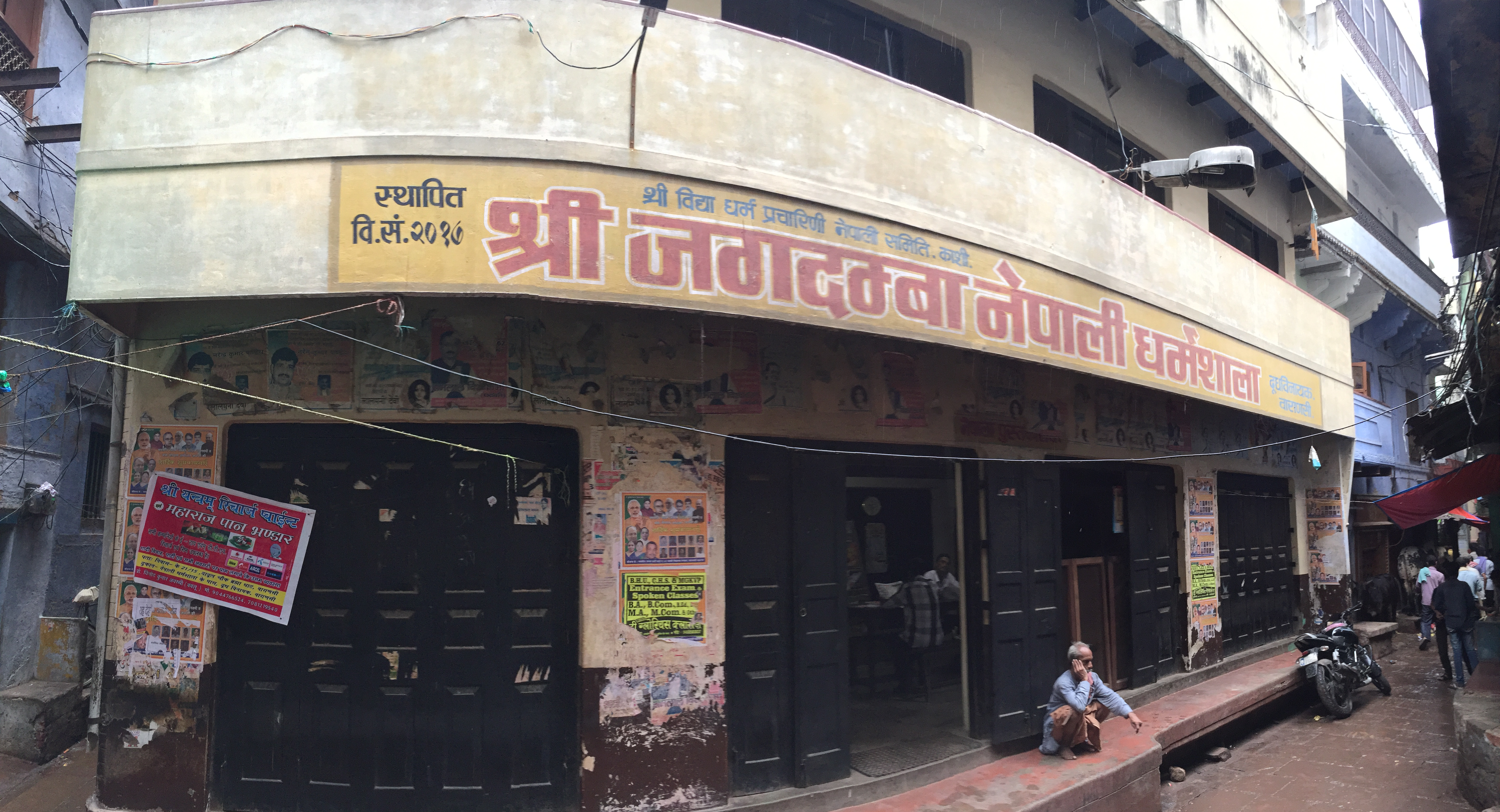
Jagadumba Nepali Dharamshala Varanasi constructed by Rani Jagadamba Kumari Devi for Nepali in 1960

== Honours ==
- (Nepal) Member of the Order of Gorkha Dakshina Bahu

== Gallery ==
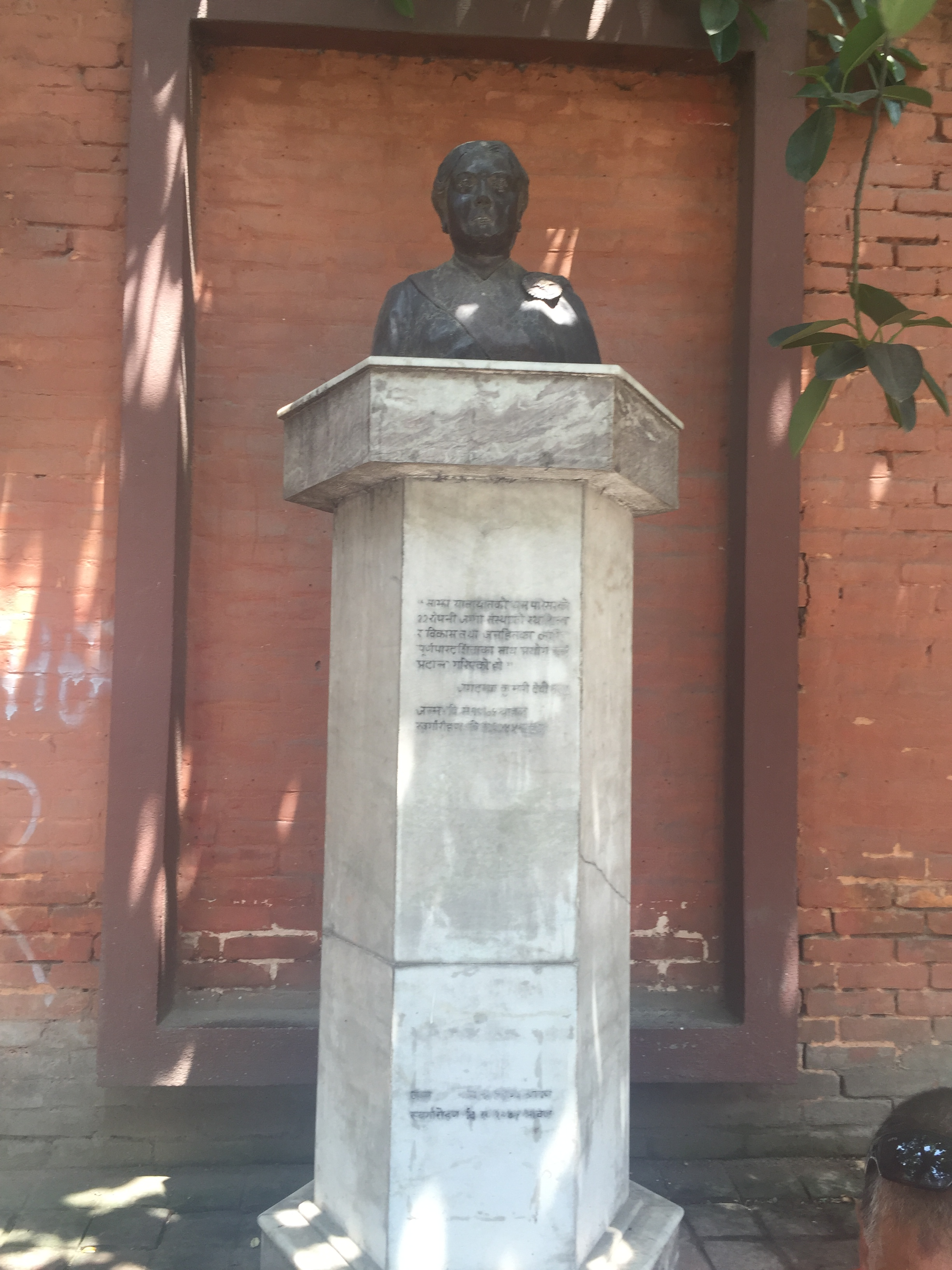
Bust of Jagadamba kumari devi in front of the compound of sajaha Yatayat where she donated 22 ropani of land

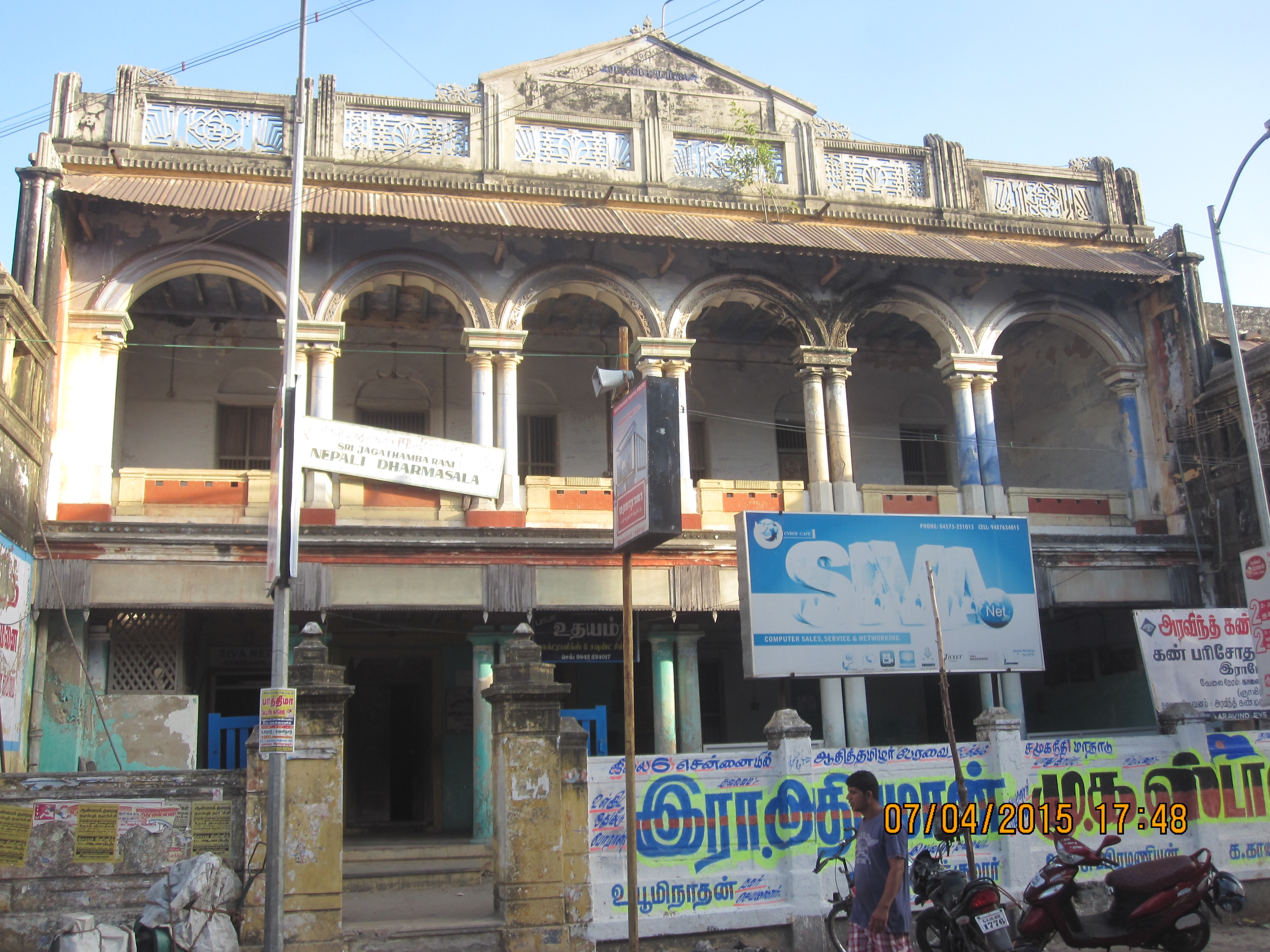
Jagadamba Nepali Dharamshala, Rameswaram Established for Nepali in 1959

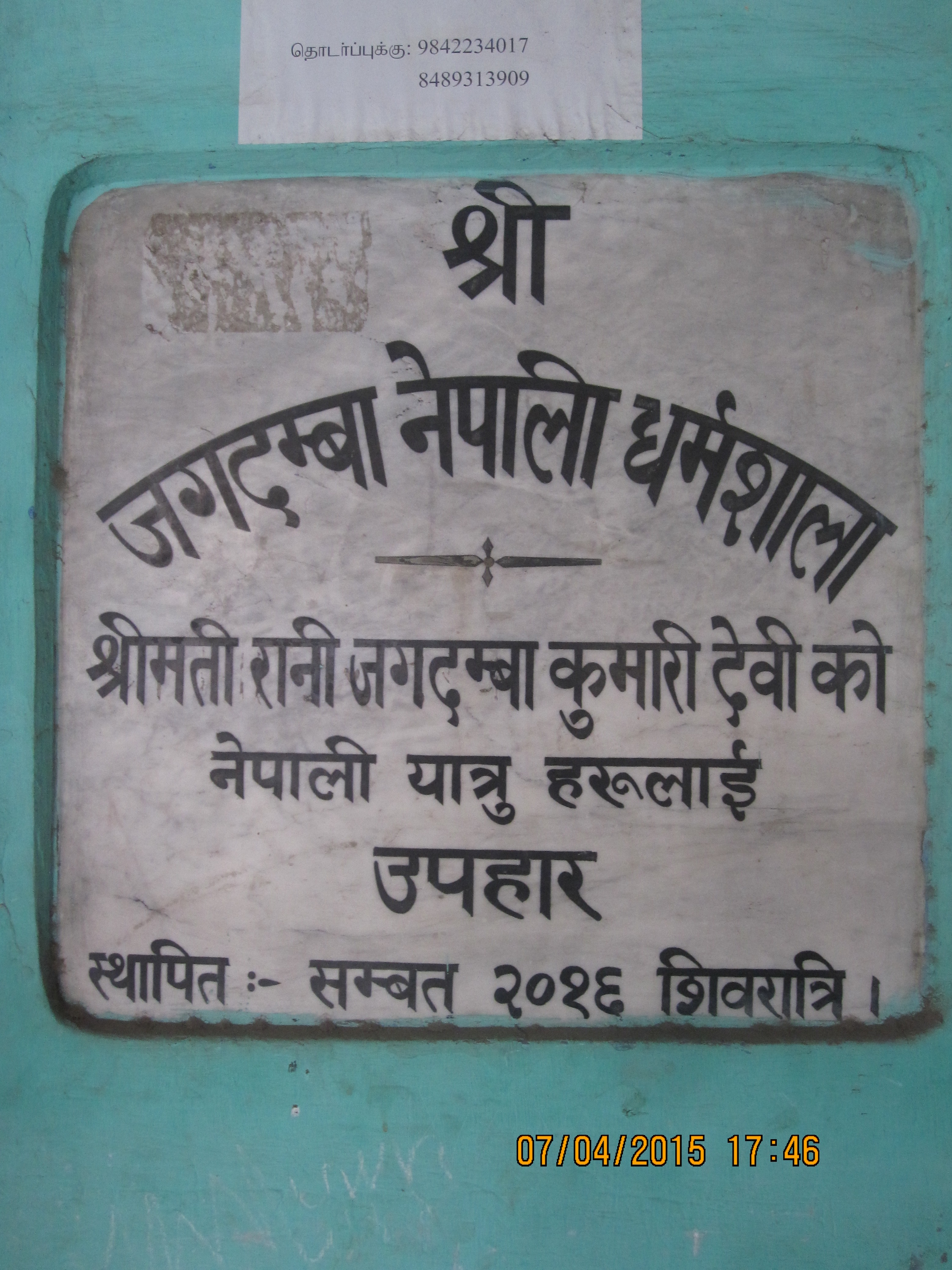
Marble Plaque at Jagadamba Nepali Dharamshala, Rameswaram translates as "A gift from queen Jagadamba Kumari Devi for Nepali Travelers, Established at Rameswaram in Maha Shivaratri 2016 BS (1959 CE)"

== See also ==
- Jagadamba Shree Purasakar
- Madan Puraskar
- Madan Puraskar Pustakalaya
- Shri Durbar
