= Lokanthali =

Lokanthali लोकन्थली
- Madyapur Thimi Municipality
- Country: Nepal
- Zone: Bagmati Zone
- District: Bhaktapur District

Population (1991)
  - Total: 5,057
  - Major Religion: Hindu
- Time zone: UTC+5:45 (Nepal Time)

Lokanthali (Nepali: लोकन्थली) is a small town in the border of Kathmandu and Bhaktapur. It lies in the Madhyapur Thimi Municipality. Population over here has increased rapidly. As of the 1991 Nepal census, it had a population of 5,057, with 894 households.

Lokanthali is the first town of Bhaktapur District. It's the town that connects Bhaktapur with Kathmandu. The Tribhuwan International Airport is only 2.1 km from Lokanthali.
