= Ratna Park =

Park in Kasthamandap, Nepal

Coordinates: 27°42′22″N 85°18′55″E

- Ratna Park
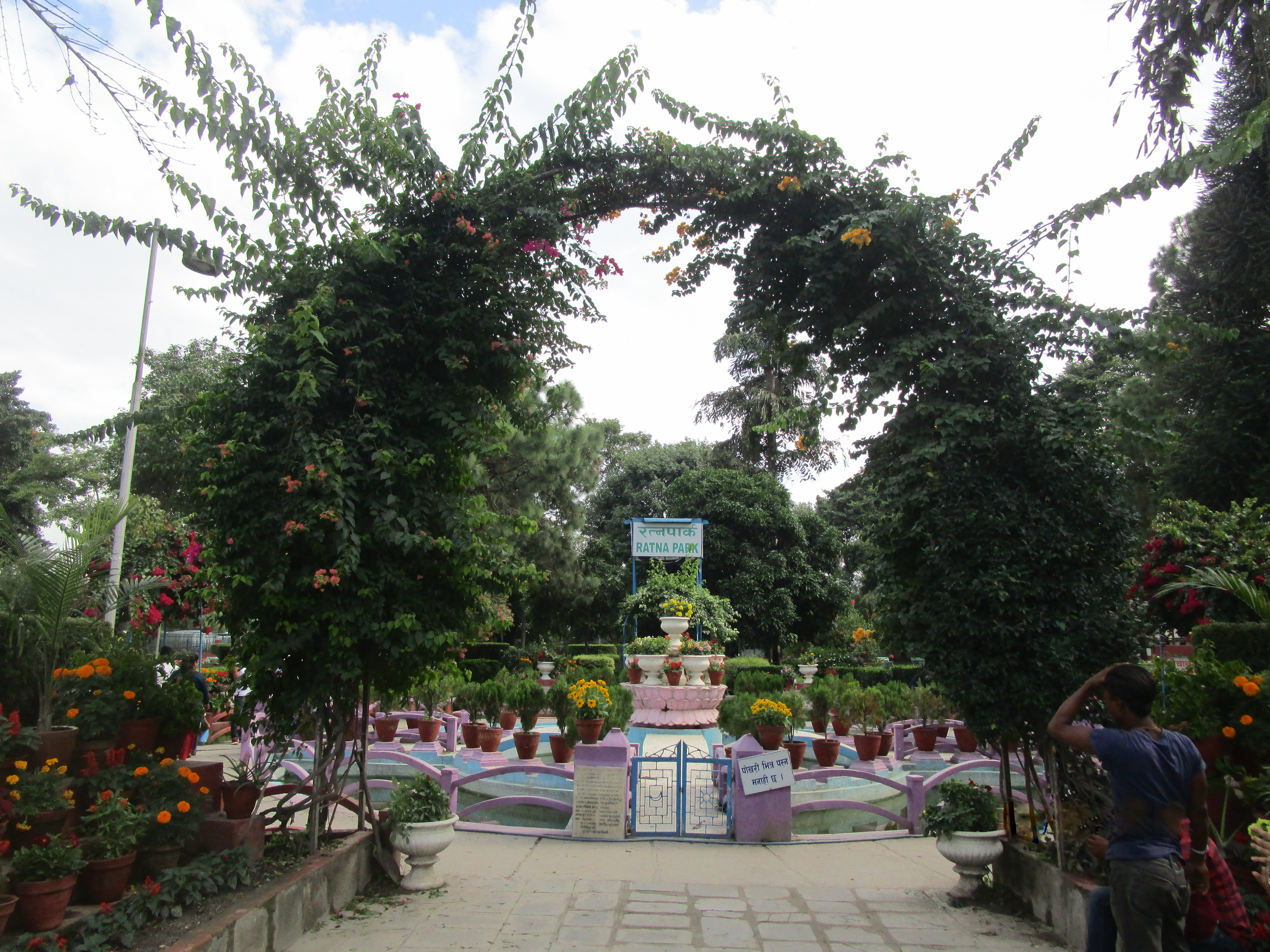
- Ratna Park entrance
- Interactive map of Ratna Park
- Location: Kathmandu, Nepal

Ratna Park is a park and surrounding district in central Kathmandu, Nepal. It is named after Queen Ratna, the second wife of King Mahendra. It was built for the children and is situated between Rani Pokhari and Tundikhel in the heart of Kathmandu.

== Gallery ==
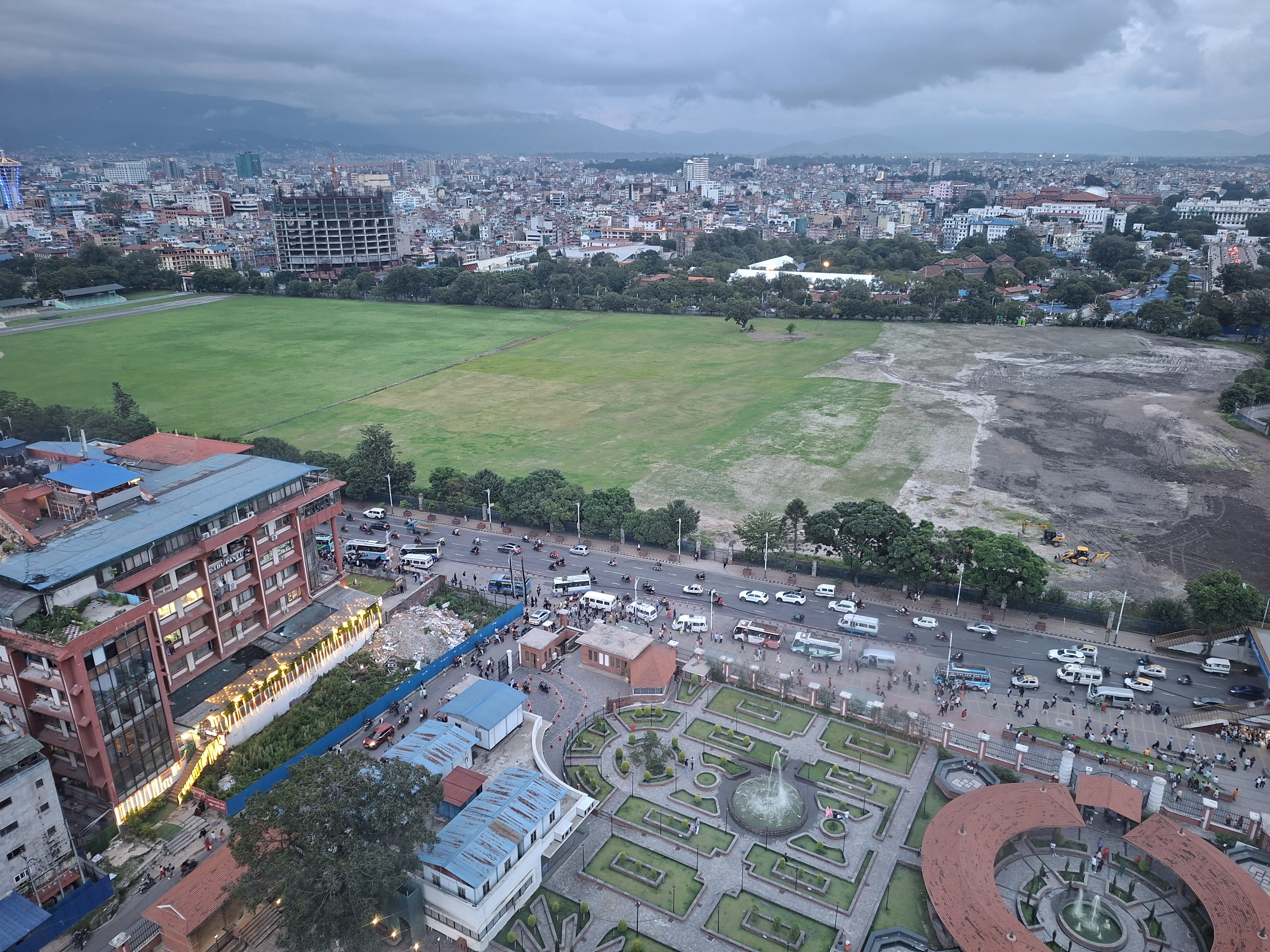
View of Ratna Park from Dharahara (Bhimsen Stambha), a 72-metre-tall (236 ft) tower in the centre of Sundhara.

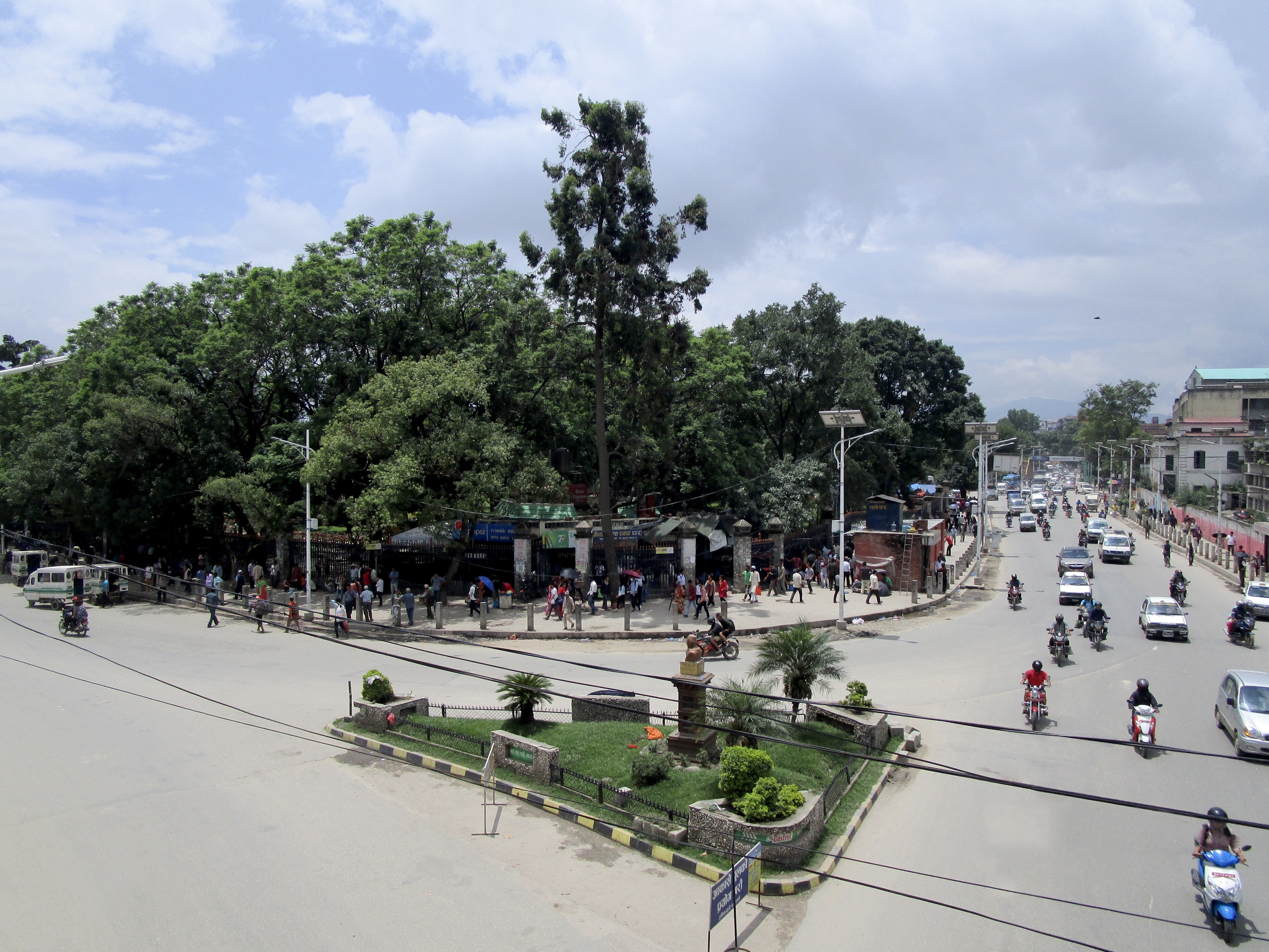
Ratna Park Intersection

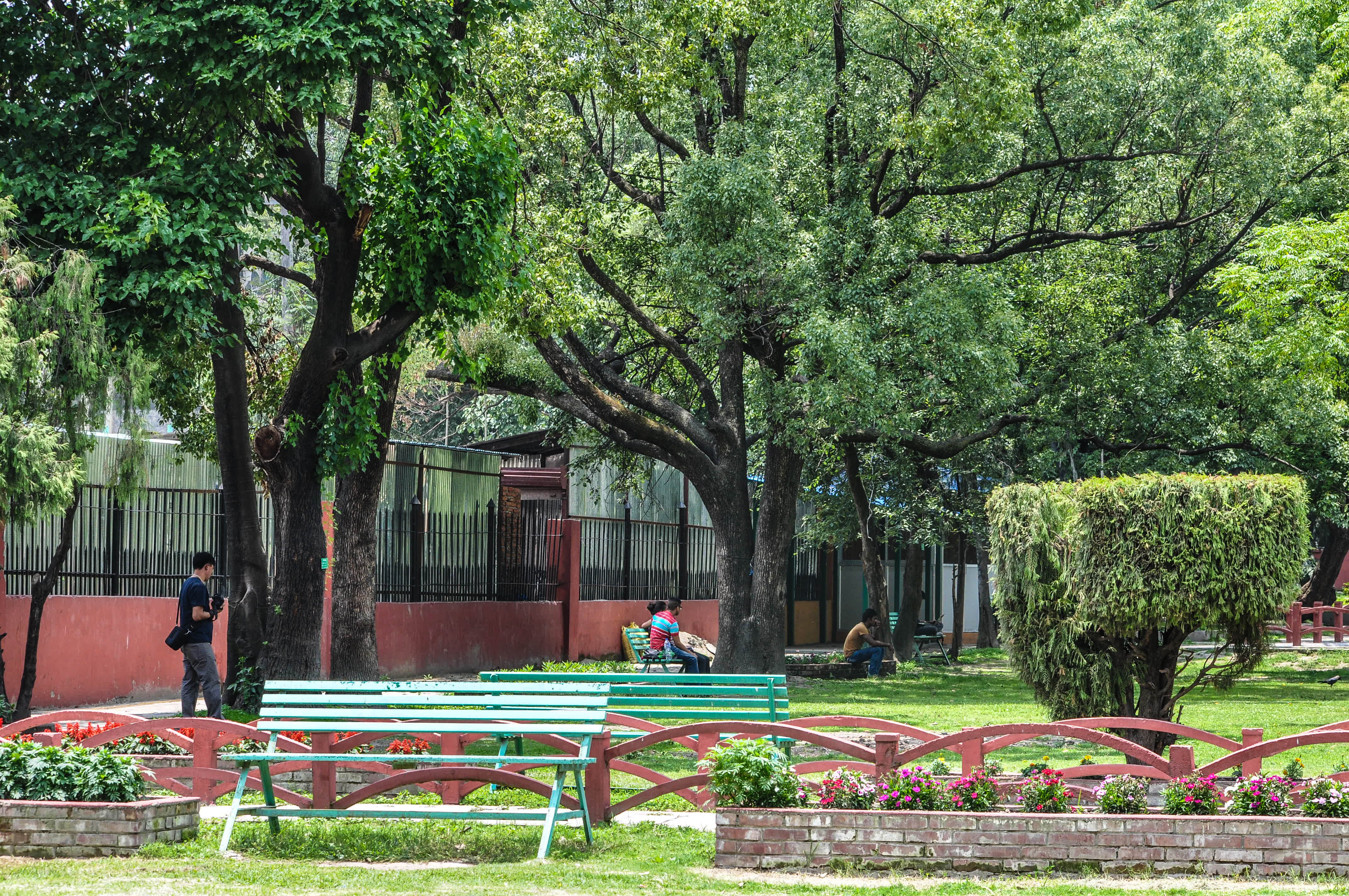
View of Garden

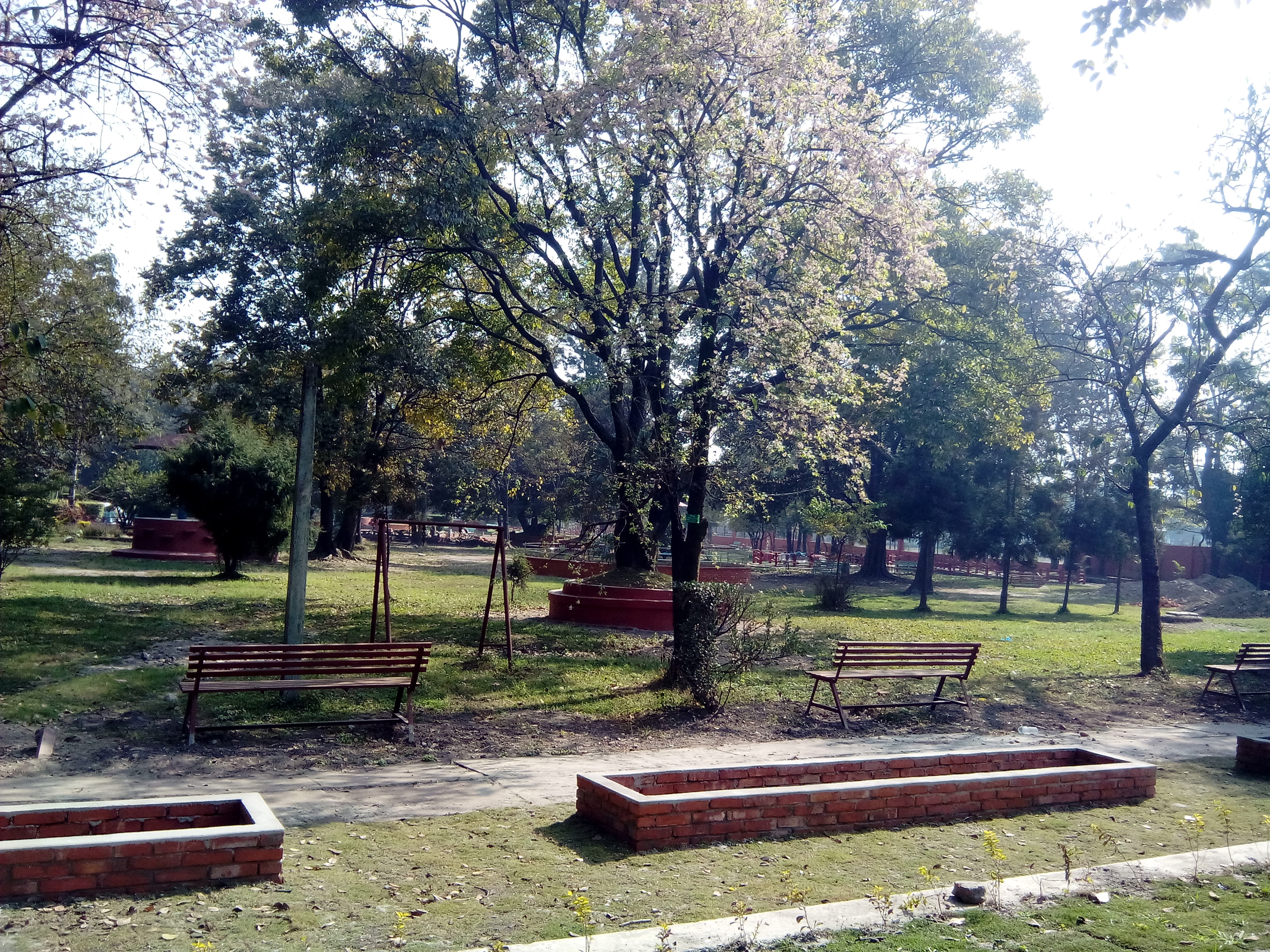
View of Garden
