= Himal Southasian =

South Asian magazine

- Cover of March 2015 Himal Southasian issue 'Labour and its Discontents'
- Founding Editor: Kanak Mani Dixit
- Editor: [Roman Gautam]
- Categories: News
- Publisher: Himal Southasian
- Founded: 1987; 39 years ago
- Based in: Sri Lanka
- Language: English
- Website: himalmag.com
- ISSN: 1012-9804

Himal Southasian (stylised as HIMĀL Southasian) is a news magazine, which covers politics and culture in South Asia. Having closed its publication from Kathmandu in November 2016, the magazine resumed publication in April 2018 from Colombo, Sri Lanka.

The magazine defines Southasia as a region beyond political dictum and geography but in relation to its people and history and strives to cover stories from Afghanistan to Burma and from Tibet to the Maldives. This region inhabited by a quarter of the world population, shares great swathes of interlocking geography, culture and history. Yet, given the complex history of rivalries and distrust, neighbouring countries can barely talk to one another, much less speak in a common voice.

== Contents ==
The magazine debuted in 1987 as the bimonthly 'Himal', with a focus on the Himalaya region. 'Himal' became the monthly 'Himal Southasian' in 1996, shifting its focus to include a broader definition of South Asia. The magazine published long-form journalism and analysis on politics, culture, history and economics. In addition, it carried reportage, reviews, photo essays and fiction. From January 2013, Himal Southasian divided its output between a thematic quarterly publication, Southasia’s first ‘bookazine’, and its website.

Himal Southasian used 'Southasia' as one word. The magazine defined the rationale "as a magazine seeking to restore some of the historical unity of our common living space—without wishing any violence on the existing nation states—we believe that the aloof geographical term 'South Asia' needs to be injected with some feeling."
