= Madan Shumsher Jung Bahadur Rana =

Nepalese cricketer

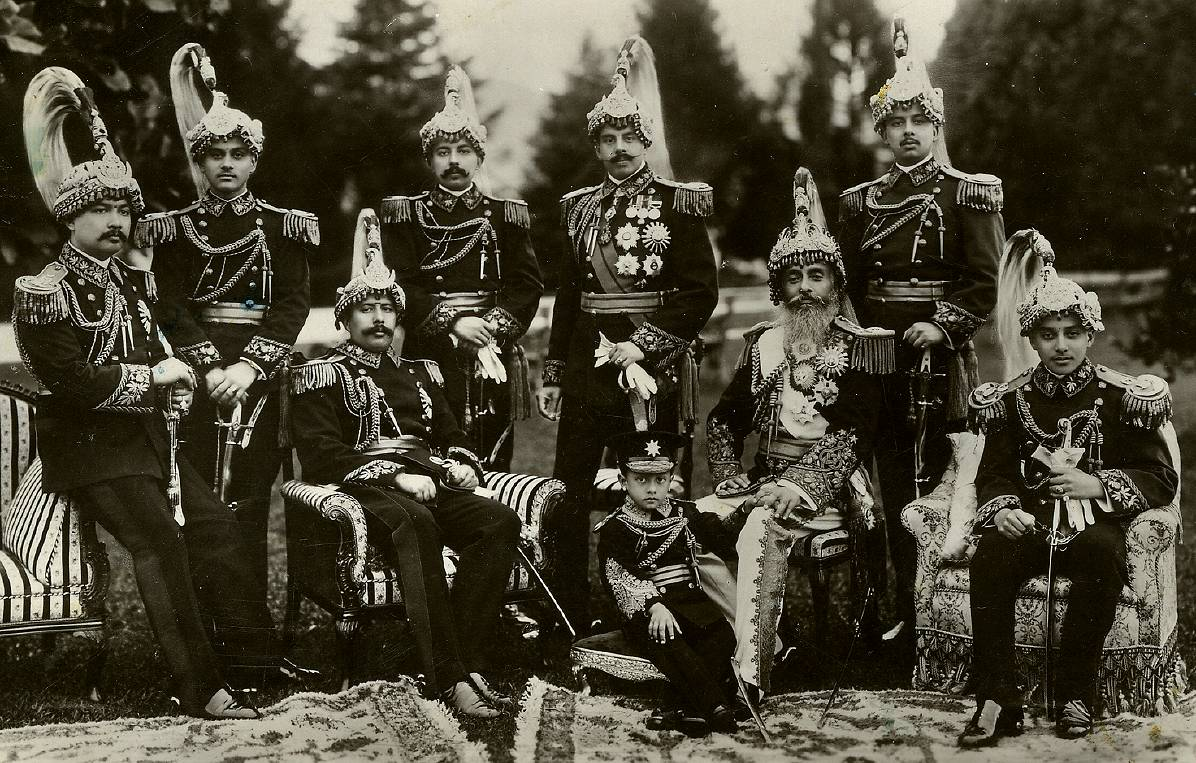
All 8 sons of Chandra Shamsher along with young Madan Shumsher (sitting)

Major General Madan Shumsher Jung Bahadur Rana was a Nepalese cricketer and a son of the 13th Prime Minister of Nepal Chandra Shumsher JBR.

He organized competitions for cricket in Nepal, and was called the "Father of Nepali Cricket". In 1947, he was made the president of the first ever Nepalese football committee. After his death in 1955, the Madan Puraskar award and Madan Puraskar Pustakalaya archive library were established in his honor by his wife, Jagadamba Kumari Devi, dedicated to Nepalese contributing in Nepali Language, Literature, Art and Folk Culture Field.

== Competitions ==
- 1947 General Madan instituted the 'Bishnu Trophy' for league tournaments.
- 1952 Madan Memorial Shield instituted.

== See also ==
- Cricket in Nepal
- Madan Puraskar
- Madan Puraskar Pustakalaya
- Jagadamba Kumari Devi
