= Manipal Teaching Hospital =

Hospital in Fulbari, Pokhara, Nepal

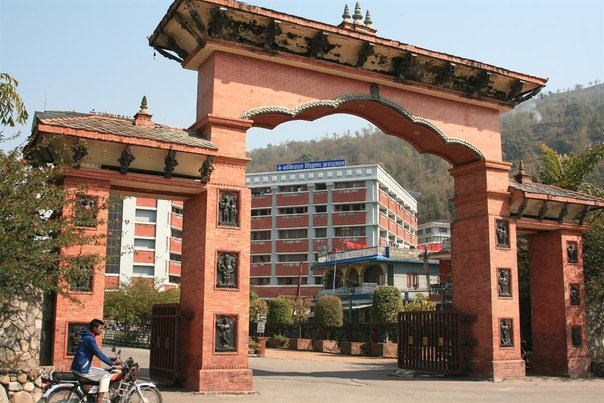
- Motto: Inspired by Life
- Type: Private
- Established: 1994
- Parent institution: Kathmandu University
- Affiliations: Kathmandu University
- President: Anil Oduvil
- Director: Abishekh Maskey (medical director)
- Management: Manipal Education and Medical Group (MEMG)
- Location: Deep Heights (college); Phulbari (Hospital); Pokhara, Nepal
- Campus: Urban
- Alumni: MCOMS Alumni Association (MCOMSAA)
- Website: www.manipalpokhara.edu.np

Manipal Teaching Hospital (MTH; Nepali: मणिपाल टीचिंग हस्पिटल) is the teaching hospital of Manipal College of Medical Sciences (MCOMS) and is located in Fulbari, Pokhara, Nepal. It is owned by Manipal Education and Medical Group, MEMG.

Manipal College of Medical Sciences (MCOMS), Pokhara was established in 1994 with an MBBS programme. MCOMS was the first private medical institute in Nepal established after liberalization in 1990. MCOMS was conceived after an agreement between Government of Nepal and Manipal Education and Medical Group MEMG in 1992. The MBBS program began in December 1994 with temporary recognition by Nepal Medical Council and Affiliation to Kathmandu University. The first batch passed final MBBS in July 1999 and completed internship in July 2000.

Western Regional Hospital back in 1996 known as Gandaki Zonal Hospital was initially used for clinical teaching purposes. Green Pastures Hospital and Regional Tuberculosis Center are being used till date partially. The 700-bed Manipal Teaching Hospital (MTH), Pokhara was inaugurated in 1998. It was enlarged to 865 beds with expanded services in cardiology, gastroenterology, neurology, neurosurgery, and surgical oncology.

== Courses ==
MBBS Duration: Five and half years (4 1/2 years + 1-year internship) MD/MS : 3 academic years MSc (non-clinical) : 2 years BSc Nursing : 4 years PCL Nursing : 3 years

Language of instruction: English

Classes begin: August

20% of the seats are reserved for Government of Nepal nominated candidates. Another 50% of the seats are offered to Nepalese candidates in the payment category. Besides students from Nepal, MCOMS attracts students from India and Sri Lanka. MCOMS also trains students from United States, Canada, South Africa, Australia, New Zealand, Oman, Kuwait, Saudi Arabia, UAE, Tanzania, Kenya, and the Maldives. About 60% of the students are men and 40% women.

Postgraduate courses are available in basic science subjects and all clinical disciplines. The postgraduate program MD in Pathology began in 1998 and MD/MS in clinical disciplines began in 2007. A residency program is conducted in the hospital with rotations in WRH. On completion of three academic years and on fulfillment of all university requirements including thesis and exam, the candidate is awarded MD/MS degree. The duration of the MD/MS program is three years and the M Sc in non-clinical subjects is two years.

== Facilities ==
MTH is the largest hospital in Western Nepal and serves as tertiary care referral center.

=== Subspeciality services ===
- Cardiology: Facilitated with noninvasive cardiac Lab with Echocardiography, TMT, Holter and ABP. Four bedded CCU with monitoring facilities. DM (Post-Doc in Cardiology) began in Feb 2013. Cardiac catheterization laboratory for invasive procedures has been installed in 2015.
- Neurosurgery: Facilities for elective and emergency neurosurgery. The department consist of an OT dedicated for neurosurgery and eight bedded Neuro-surgical ICU with ventilator and monitoring facilities.
- Gastroenterology and Hepatology: Diagnostic and treatment facilities with intensive care. Routine Diagnostic and therapeutic endoscopy services.
- Medical Oncology: Radiotherapy, Cobalt 60 and Linear particle accelerator LINAC(the only radio-therapeutic installation in Western Nepal)
- Oral and Maxillofacial Surgery
- Plastic and Reconstructive Surgery
- Onco Surgery
- Nephrology: Eight hemodialysis machines for routine and emergency dialysis.
- Cardiothoracic surgery: CTVS unit is run by 1 CTVS Surgeon, Thoracic surgeries without CP by-pass are being done routinely, CP By-pass installation is proposed.

=== Critical care ===
- Medical ICU: 12 beds
- Surgical ICU (post-op): 8 beds
- Neuro Surgical ICU: 8 beds
- Cardiac Care Unit: 4 beds
- Pediatric ICU: 8 beds
- Neonatal ICU: 16 beds

All 50 ICU beds have central oxygen supply, cardiac monitors, central Arterial Blood gas analysis with mechanical ventilators. NICU has incubators, photo therapy, CPAP and ventilators.

Telemedicine Department of Internal Medicine, Manipal Teaching Hospital in collaboration University of Illinois, Chicago with technical support of Binaytara foundation runs a weekly Telemedicine session. MTH is the first institute in the country to have a program of such kind. Telemedicine is part of a Medicine Resident's academic activity.

== Affiliations and recognitions ==
- An institution of the Manipal Education and Medical Group (MEMG), Nepal.
- Affiliated to Kathmandu University, Dhulikhel, Nepal.
- Accorded recognition by the Medical Councils of Nepal, Sri Lanka, Bangladesh and Mauritius.
- Listed in the 7th edition of the WHO's world directory of accredited medical schools and the International Medical Education Directory of Educational Commission for Foreign Medical Graduates (ECFMG) which holds the United States Medical Licensing Examination(USMLE).

Manipal College of Medical Sciences (MCOMS) is also recognized by the British Columbia & Ontario Student Assistance Program (BCSAP & OSAP), Canada.

- Established in 1994 and the first batch graduated in 1999. Since then every year one or two batches have graduated.

Most of the students have passed their postgraduate entrance exams/international exams i.e., Medical Council Exams of United States (USMLE), UK (PLAB), Australia, South Africa and Sri Lanka.

MTH runs residency (MD/MS) in clinical and non clinical disciplines and elective programmes.

== Poor Patient's Fund (PPF) ==
Also known as Asha (आशा), it is a non-governmental organization(NGO) which is run by the students (mainly the 5th semester MBBS students). Funds are raised by the students by organizing movie shows, dances, college fetes, sales of T-shirts and sweat shirts, donations from the students and faculty, etc. The fund is utilized for the treatment of those patients who are unable to afford it on their own.

== College journal ==
Nepal Journal of Medical Sciences
- Discipline: Biomedicine
- Language: English
- Edited by: Prakash Sharma

Publication details
- History: 2012-present
- Publisher: Manipal College of Medical Sciences
- Frequency: Biannual
- Open access: Yes
- License: CC-BY 4.0

Standard abbreviations
- ISO 4: Nepal J. Med. Sci.

Indexing
- ISSN: 2091-1424 (print); 2091-1459 (web)
- OCLC no.: 871188830

Links
- Journal homepage; Online access; Online archive

The Nepal Journal of Medical Sciences is a biannual peer-reviewed open access medical journal and the official journal of Manipal College of Medical Sciences. It was established in 2012 and contains original articles, review articles, case reports, editorials, and letters to the editor. The editor-in-chief is Prakash Sharma. The journal is abstracted and indexed in CAB Abstracts.

== See also ==
- Manipal College of Medical Sciences
