= Dhulikhel Medical Institute =

Medical college in Dhulikhel, Nepal

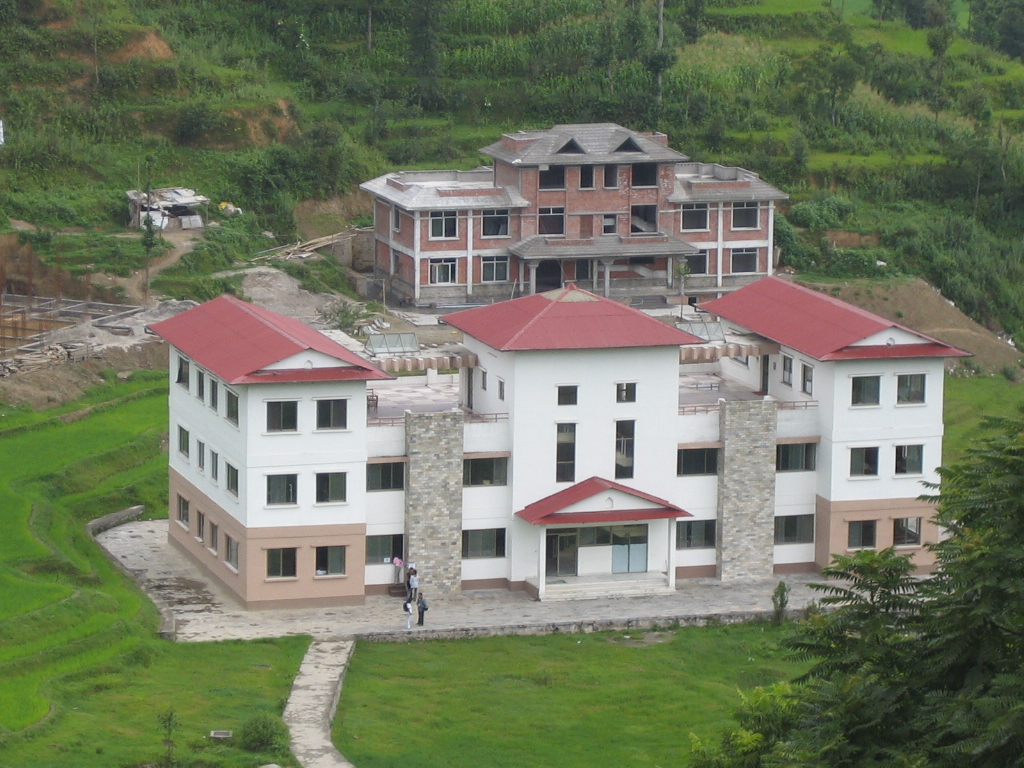
- Motto: Inspired by Life
- Type: Private
- Established: 1998; 28 years ago
- Affiliation: Kathmandu University
- Director: Prof.Regina Singh
- Management: Municipality of Dhulikhel, NepaliMed International and Dhulikhel Health Service Association
- Location: Dhulikhel, Nepal
- Campus: Urban
- Alumni: Society of Ex-Manipal Students (SEMS-Pokhara)
- Website: www.kusms.edu.np

Dhulikhel Medical Institute (DMI ), in Dhulikhel, Nepal, was created in 1998 through a partnership between Dhulikhel Hospital, Kathmandu University, and Til Ganga Eye Care Centre with the assistance of DANIDA, Dhulikhel Municipality Quality Education Project. It is an autonomous, independent training institution established to train different faculties of health manpower.

The first graduation ceremony of DMI was in 2002 January. There were eleven students: four in Nursing, six in General Medicine and one in Clinical Health Laboratory. There are currently about 300 students in nursing, general medicine, clinical health laboratory, ophthalmology and physiotherapy. A Diploma in Health Sciences is granted by Kathmandu University School of Medical Sciences after the successful completion of the three-year academic course. The graduated students from DMI provide services in different parts of Nepal as well as many other foreign countries.

== Faculties ==
Dhulikhel Medical Institute offers education and training in different faculties.

1. Nursing
2. General Medicine
3. Clinical Health Laboratory
4. Ophthalmology
5. Physiotherapy
