= Kathmandu University High School =

- Chaukot, Kavre

Information
- Type: High school
- Motto: Education beyond the textbook, Education beyond the classroom.
- Established: 1998
- School district: Kavrepalanchok District
- Principal: Narad Kumar Rijal
- Staff: 85
- Grades: 1 — +2
- Enrollment: 650
- Website: kuhs.edu.np

Kathmandu University High School (KUHS) is a high school located in Chaukot, Panauti, in the Kavrepalanchok District of Nepal. Kathmandu University High School, initially named Kathmandu University Preparatory School, was established in 1998 with only 60 primary students from local areas and children of the staff of Kathmandu University. The School started in a rented building near a place called Bansghari in Dhulikhel with a few staff members, under the leadership of Mr. Aiden Warlow as principal. The school has always been a non-profit organization established under the umbrella of Kathmandu University.

In 2000, the school moved to its own new campus in Chaukot, provided by Kathmandu University. In 2009, the school opened the A level program from the University of Cambridge International Examinations.

The school currently has four major buildings for teaching and learning from grades one to twelve: The school has its own Primary Boys and Girls .The school began its (10 + 2) examination in the Science stream, in addition to the A level programme from the University of Cambridge International Examinations. The Cambridge A-level programme is no longer continued in KUHS. The school receives support and cooperation from teaching and non-teaching staffs of Kathmandu University and Dhulikhel Teaching Hospital.
