= Suresh Raj Sharma =

Nepali educationist (1940–2026)

- सुरेशराज शर्मा
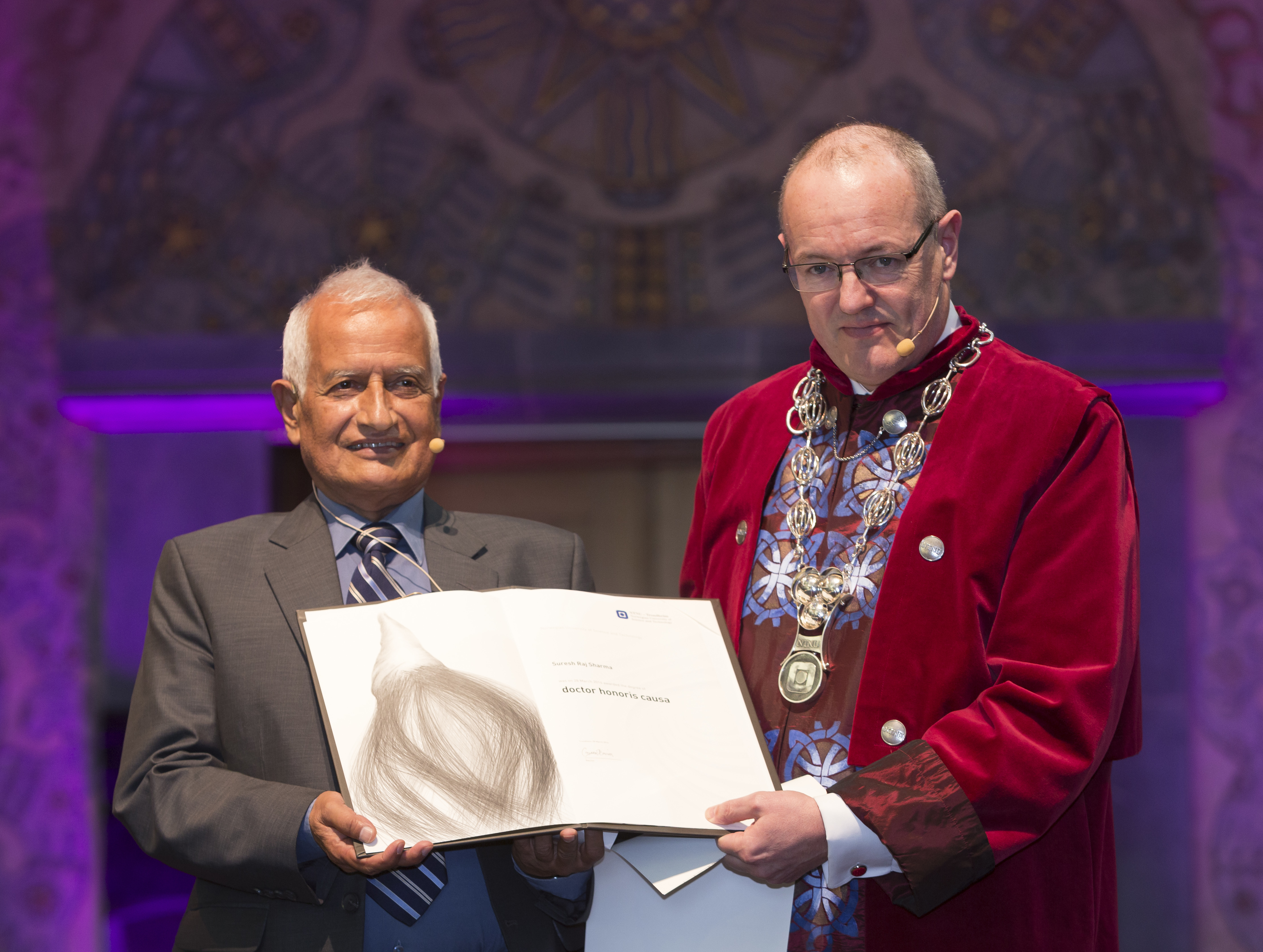
- Sharma being awarded an honorary doctorate at the Norwegian University of Science and Technology in 2014
- Born: 22 July 1940; Khurkot village, Sindhuli District, Nepal
- Died: 23 September 2026 (aged 86); Kathmandu, Nepal
- Education: Public Science College; Karnatak University; London South Bank University (PhD)
- Known for: Founder of Kathmandu University
- Notable work: Kathmandu University, established CTEVT
- Title: Vice Chancellor
- Term: 1991–2012
- Successor: Ram Kantha Makaju Shrestha
- Spouse: Urmila Dhungel (died. 2024)
- Children: 4
- Parents: Bishnu Prasad Upadhyaya (father); Savitri Devi Dhungel (mother)
- Relatives: Brothers: Madan Raj Sharma, Dinesh Dhungel, Surya Dhungel, Jalan Raj Sharma, Kalyan Dhungel, Gopal Prasad Dhungel, Mohan Dhungel, Mukunda Prasad Upadhaya, Umesh Sharma (Principal, Medical College); Sisters: Sobha Pokharel, Durga Pokharel, Manju Pokharel, Medha Subedi

Suresh Raj Sharma (Nepali: डा. सुरेशराज शर्मा; 22 July 1940 – 23 September 2026) was a Nepali educationist who was the founder Vice Chancellor of Kathmandu University.

Sharma held a Ph.D. in Chemistry from London South Bank University, London. He was the first executive director of the Council for Technical Education and Vocational Training, Member Secretary in National Education Committee, Member of National Commission for UNESCO, and National Delegate to the SAARC Technical committee on science and technology. Sharma was a well-known educational administrator. He made significant contribution to the development of education policy in Nepal. He had a number of books, research papers, articles, secondary school curriculum textbook and many more to his credit.

He was a lifelong member of the board of trustees of Kathmandu University.

== Early life and education ==
Sharma was born in Khurkot village, Sindhuli District on 22 July 1940, to Bishnu Prasad Upadhyaya and Savitri Devi Dhungel. Bishnu Prasad Upadhyaya was a lawyer who, although born a Dhungel, chose to write Upadhyaya as his surname. Savitri Devi Dhungel was the sister of two brothers, the famous writer Kul Chandra Koirala and songwriter Divya Dev Koirala.

He initially received education at home before setting out to study in Sonbarsa, India, in 1953, where he studied for nine months. In 2013 B.S. he passed his School Leaving Certificate examinations from Saraswati High School, Janakpur. After completing his I.Sc. and B.Sc. both from Public Science Campus (currently Amrit Science College) in the span of five years, Sharma went to study in Karnatak University, India under the Colombo Plan Scholarship. Sharma then received his Ph.D. in Chemistry from the Polytechnic of the South Bank, London, in 1977 (now London South Bank University).

== Career ==
Even before heading out to London for his Ph.D., Sharma had gained experience in academic and administrative areas. Sharma worked for twelve years as a professor in Tribhuvan University during which he also taught in Tri-Chandra College, Anandakuti College, Padma Kanya College and Nepal National College (currently Shankar Dev Campus). From 1989 to 1992, he worked as first executive director of the Council for Technical Education and Vocational Training, which was conceptualized by himself. In the year 1991, he along with Sitaram Adhikary, Bhadra Man Tuladhar, and others successfully managed to charter Kathmandu University from Parliament. A month later, he was appointed the first-ever vice chancellor of the University.

In 2014 he was awarded an honorary doctorate by the Norwegian University of Science and Technology.

== Death ==
Sharma died on 23 September 2026, at the age of 86, while undergoing treatment at HAMS hospital in Kathmandu. He was given a state funeral and was cremated the next day.
