= DMIS =

DMIS may refer to:

- Developmental Model of Intercultural Sensitivity, or Bennett scale
- Dimensional Measuring Interface Standard, in dimensional metrology
- Doha Modern Indian School, in Qatar

== See also ==
- Doctor of Missiology (DMiss)
- DMI (disambiguation)
