= Kathmandu University School of Medical Sciences =

Medical sciences school in Kathmandu, Nepal

Kathmandu University School of Medical Sciences (KUSMS) is one of the nine schools of Kathmandu University running medical, nursing and allied health science program. KUSMS is a collaborative program of Kathmandu University and Dhulikhel Hospital. The main office of KUSMS is on the premises of Dhulikhel Hospital, a Kathmandu University hospital, in Kavrepalanchok District, Nepal. KUSMS was set up in 1994. Manipal College of Medical Sciences in Pokhara was the first medical college to be granted affiliation. Since then, KUSMS has granted affiliation to several medical colleges around the country.

KUSMS formally started its own medical training program, the MBBS program, on 7 September 2001 in association with Dhulikhel Hospital. The first class was 43 Nepali students. The day is annually celebrated as KUSMS Day. Although the medical school is still widely known as KUMS, inside and outside the country, its name was changed to Kathmandu University School of Medical Sciences (KUSMS) in 2006, as it not only trains medical undergraduates and postgraduates, but also runs nursing and allied health science programs.

In 2018, the total tuition for the MBBS degree was Rs. 3.7 million (US$31,672) making the school one of the cheapest institutions to get a degree.

== Aims and objectives ==
The school is a non-profit organization with a motto of producing "technically competent and socially responsible" doctors and other medical and nursing professionals. The main focus of the organization is to contribute in improving the overall health status of Nepal.

== Courses ==
KUSMS runs the following programs:

- MBBS
- Bachelor of Dental Surgery
- BSc Human Biology
- BSc. Nursing (four years)
- BSc. Nursing in Midwifery
- Bachelor of Nursing Sciences (BNS)- Three and half years course
- Bachelor of Physiotherapy (BPT) – Four and half years course
- Certificate in Nursing under Dhulikhel Medical Institute
- Postgraduate program in basic and clinical sciences
- DM and MCh program in Cardiology, Neurology, Nephrology, Cardiothoracic and Neurosurgery in affiliated college.

The duration of the MBBS program is five and a half years of medical education. This includes one year of clinical internship. The first two years consists of learning basic science courses, where special emphasis is laid on problem-based and community-oriented learning. In the ensuing two and a half years, the medical students are taught and trained in clinical disciples. The students complete a year of clinical internship in clinical departments as well as in remote outreach health centers before the final medical diploma is issued by the university.

== Administration ==
- Vice Chancellor: Prof. Achyut Wagle
- Dean: Prof. Dr. Manoj Humagain

== Colleges granted affiliation by KUSMS to run MBBS courses ==
- Manipal College of Medical Sciences, Pokhara
- Kathmandu Medical College, Kathmandu
- Nepal Medical College, Kathmandu
- Nepalgunj Medical College, Nepalgunj, Kohalpur, Chisapani
- College of Medical Sciences, Bharatpur 10
- Nobel Medical College, Biratnagar
- Lumbini Medical College, Palpa
- Birat medical college, Biratnagar
- Devdaha medical college, Bhairhawa
- B&C Medical College, Jhapa

== College granted affiliation by KUSMS to run BDS courses ==
- Kantipur Dental College, Kathmandu
- Nobel Medical College, Biratnagar
- Nepal Medical College, Kathmandu
- Kathmandu Medical College, Kathmandu
- College of Medical Sciences, Bharatpur

== Colleges granted affiliation by KUSMS to run BSc. Nursing courses ==
- Scheer Memorial Hospital, College of Nursing, Banepa
- Kathmandu Medical College, Kathmandu
- Manipal College of Medical Sciences, Pokhara
- College of Medical Sciences, Bharatpur
- Nobel Medical College, Biratnagar tinpaini, morang
- Lumbini Medical College, Palpa
- Birat Medical College, Biratnagar

== Criticism and Controversies ==
Medical education in Nepal is highly controversial as many qualified students are turned away in lieu of competitive marks. Corruption is rampant with schools accepting students based on connections to established figures or illicit donations made to the school. The "hidden" tuition, as it's referred, is the additional cost of bribing officials in the education and healthy ministry with some students paying triple the tuition fees for enrollment.

Dr. Govinda KC is a staunch supporter of medical education reform in Nepal and has long advocated to break the education "mafia" present in the system.

== See also ==
- Kathmandu University
- Dhulikhel Hospital
