= KUHS =

Kuhs or KUHS may refer to:

- Kuhs, a municipality in the Rostock district, in Mecklenburg-Vorpommern, Germany
- Kathmandu University High School, Panauti, Nepal
- Kerala University of Health Sciences, Thrissur, Kerala, India
- Klamath Union High School, Klamath Falls, Oregon, United States
- KUHS-LP, a low-power radio station (102.5 FM) licensed to serve Hot Springs, Arkansas, United States
