= KUMS =

KUMS may refer to:

- KUMS (FM), a radio station (89.7 FM) licensed to serve White Sulphur Springs, Montana, United States
- Kathmandu University School of Medical Sciences, formerly known as Kathmandu University Medical School
