= Kathmandu Medical College =

Hospital in Nepal

- Type: Private
- Established: 1997; 28 years ago
- Principal: Ratindra Nath Shrestha
- Location: Sinamangal, Kathmandu, Nepal
- Affiliations: Kathmandu University
- Website: www.kmc.edu.np/contactus.php

Kathmandu Medical College And Teaching Hospital (KMCTH) is a medical college located in Kathmandu the capital city of Nepal.

Established in 1997, KMC is a private medical college in Nepal. The college is permanently affiliated to Kathmandu University and fully recognised by the Medical Council of Nepal, Sri Lankan Medical Council, General Medical Council (UK) and Medical Council of India. Kathmandu Medical College Teaching Hospital has also been listed in the WHO's World Directory of Medical Schools electronic format as from June 2002. Following full recognition by NMC, KMCTH is also listed in the World Directory of Medical Schools. It was also listed in the now discontinued International Medical Education Directory (IMED). KMC is an Associate Member of the Network Towards Unity for Health (TUFH) that has its headquarters at Glent in Belgium.

== See also ==
- Kathmandu University School of Medical Sciences
- Education in Nepal
