= Kathmandu University School of Engineering =

School of Engineering, Kathmandu University
- काठमाण्डौ विश्वविद्यालय इन्जिनियरिङ्ग स्कुल
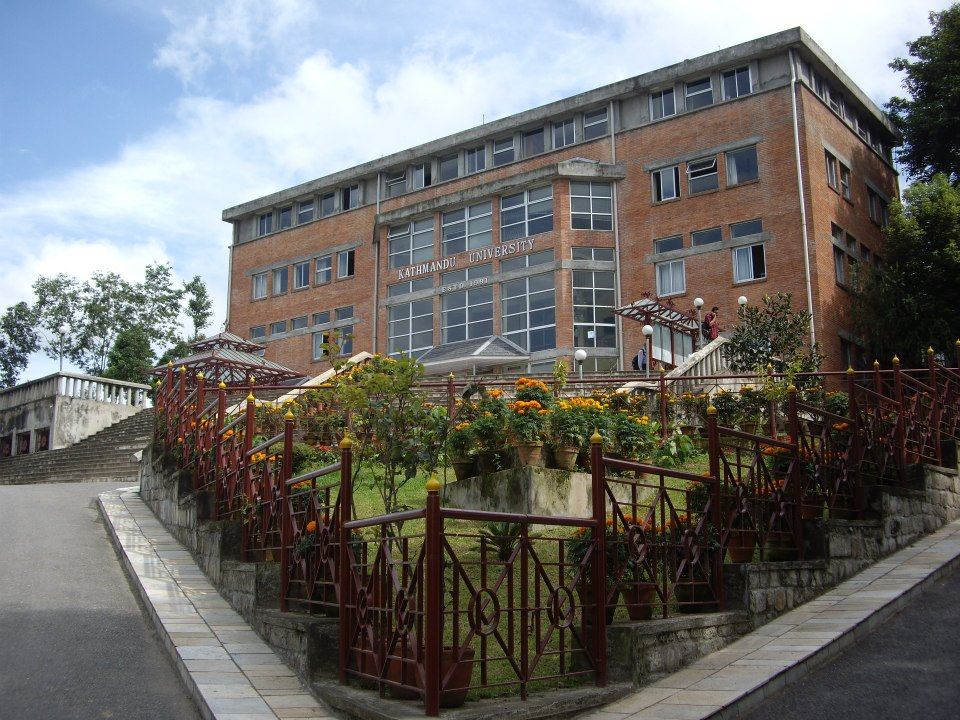
- Logo of the School of Engineering
- Type: Public
- Established: 1994
- Parent institution: Kathmandu University
- Dean: Prof. Manish Pokharel, Ph.D.
- Location: Dhulikhel, Bagmati Province, Nepal
- Campus: Rural
- Website: soe.ku.edu.np

Kathmandu University School of Engineering (KUSoE) is one of the seven constituent schools of Kathmandu University (KU), located in Dhulikhel, Kavrepalanchok District, Bagmati Province, Nepal. Established in 1994, the school offers a range of undergraduate and graduate programs in engineering and technology.

== Artificial intelligence programs ==
In August 2021, Kathmandu University's School of Engineering launched Nepal's first dedicated degree programs in Artificial Intelligence: the Bachelor of Technology in Artificial Intelligence (BTech AI) and the Master of Technology in Artificial Intelligence (MTech AI).

== Research ==
The School of Engineering actively engages in research through various centers and labs:

- Turbine Testing Lab
- High Performance Computing Lab
- Geomatics Engineering Lab
- Center for Artificial Intelligence

== International collaboration ==
SoE has collaborations with several international institutions:

- Norwegian University of Science and Technology (NTNU)
- AIT Thailand
- Universities in Germany, China, Japan, and the USA
- Indian Institute of Technology Madras (IITM)

== Student Life ==
School of Engineering - Departmental Clubs :

- KU Robotics Club
- Society of Electrical and Electronic Engineers (SEEE)
- Kathmandu University Computer Club (KUCC)
- Association of Mechanical Engineering Students (AMES)
- Geomatics Engineering Society (GES)
- Kathmandu University Computer Club (KUCC)
- Kathmandu University Civil Engineering Club (KUCEC)
- Kathmandu University Architecture Club (KUARC), Previously known as KUARSA
- Forum for Environmental Conservation and Management (FECAM)

The school hosts annual technical fests, hackathons, and exhibitions to foster student innovation and teamwork.

== Campus ==
The School of Engineering is located at the main Dhulikhel campus of Kathmandu University.

== Programs Offered ==
Department of Computer Science and Engineering :

- Bachelor of Engineering (Computer Engineering) (Started in 1994)
- Bachelor of Information Technology (BIT) - Regular
- Bachelor of Information Technology (BIT) - Double Degree
- Bachelor of Technology (B. Tech) in Cybersecurity
- Master of Engineering (Computer Engineering)
- Master of Technology (Information Technology)
- Ph.D in Computer Engineering

Department of Electrical and Electronics Engineering :

- Bachelor of Engineering in Electrical and Electronics Engineering (with specialization in Power & Control or Communication) (Started in 1994)
- Master of Engineering in Electrical Power Engineering (MEEPE)
- Master of Engineering in Communication Engineering (MECOM)
- MS By Research
- Ph.D in Electrical and Electronics Engineering

Department of Mechanical Engineering :

- Bachelor of Engineering in Mechanical Engineering (Started in 1994)
- Master of Engineering (Planning and Operation of Energy System)
- Master of Mechanical Engineering
- Master Program in Energy Efficient Building Design (EEBD)
- MS by Research
- Ph.D in Mechanical Engineering

Department of Geomatics Engineering :

- Bachelors of Engineering in Geomatics Engineering (Started in 2007)
- Master in Land Administration
- ME/MS in Geoinformatics
- Ph.D in Geomatics Engineering

Department of Chemical Science and Engineering :

- Bachelors of Engineering in Chemical Engineering

Department of Environmental Engineering :

- Bachelors of Engineering in Environmental Engineering
- M.E in Green Infrastructure Engineering
- M.E. in Environmental Engineering
- MS by Research
- Ph.D in Environmental Engineering

Department of Architecture :

- Bachelor in Heritage Conservation (BHC)
- Bachelor of Architecture (B.Arch)
- MS by Research
- Ph.D in Architecture

Department of Civil Engineering :

- Bachelor of Engineering in Civil Engineering (Started in 2009)
- Bachelor of Engineering in Mining Engineering
- Master in Engineering in Structural Engineering
- ME/MS Sanitation Technology
- Ph.D in Civil Engineering

Department of Health informatics :

- Bachelor in Health Informatics
- Master in Health Informatics
- MS by Research

Department of Artificial Intelligence :

- Bachelor of Technology in Artificial Intelligence
- Master of Technology in Artificial Intelligence

== See also ==
- Kathmandu University
- Education in Nepal
- List of engineering colleges in Nepal
