= Manipal College of Medical Sciences =

Medical college in Pokhara, Nepal

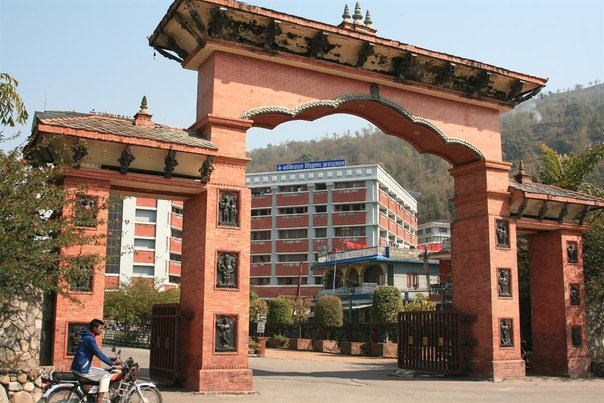
- Motto: Inspired by Life
- Type: Private
- Established: 1994; 32 years ago
- Parent institution: Kathmandu University
- Affiliations: Kathmandu University
- President: Anil Oduvil
- Director: Dr. Abhishekh Maskey(hospital director)
- Management: Manipal Education and Medical Group (MEMG)
- Location: Fulbari (Hospital); Pokhara, Nepal
- Campus: Urban
- Alumni: Society of Ex-Manipal Students (SEMS-Pokhara)
- Website: www.manipalpokhara.edu.np

Manipal College of Medical Sciences (MCOMS) is a private medical college at Pokhara, Nepal. It is associated with Manipal Teaching Hospital, and enrols about 100 students each year for the MBBS medical qualification.

== Senior staff ==
- CEO: Anil Oduvil
- Director Academics (Clinical Sciences): Dr. Abhishek Maskey
- Associate Director Academics (Clinical Sciences): Dr Ramchandra Kafle
- Director Academics (Basic Sciences): Dr. Shishir Gokhale
- Associate Director Academics (Basic Sciences): Dr Daya Ram Pokharel
- Director (Basic Sciences): Dr. Shishir Gokhale
- Hospital Director: Dr. Abhishek Maskey

== Location ==
MCOMS has two locations in Pokhara. The basic sciences campus is located at Deep Heights, and 1st and 2nd year courses are taught there. The administrative block is also located at Deep Heights. The clinical campus with the teaching hospital, is located at Phulbari, Pokhara, overlooking the Annapurna mountain range.

== Courses ==
- Post-graduation (MD/MS)
- MBBS
- PCL Nursing
- B.SC. Nursing (started 2009)

=== MBBS ===
The annual enrolment for the MBBS degree is 100 students (data from 2019). The majority of the students are of Nepalese and Indian origin. Students from other nations such as: Sri Lanka, Maldives, United States of America (NRN), Canada (NRN), etc. are also enrolled. Many elective students visit from American and European Universities and have the opportunity for hands on training.

Subjects covered:

- Anatomy
- Biochemistry
- Community Medicine-Part I
- Microbiology
- Pathology
- Pharmacology
- Physiology

The basic science training takes place at Deep Campus. After passing all the subjects of basic sciences, a student is promoted to the clinical aspect of the course.

The next five semesters are devoted to the study of clinical sciences, and are held at Manipal Teaching Hospital, Pokhara. The students are intensively trained and evaluated. The third year university examinations are held at the end of the 7th semester, and include the following subjects:

- Community Medicine-Part II
- Forensic Medicine
- Ophthalmology
- Otorhinolaryngology

After the successful completion of all 4 subjects of the third year, a student is allowed to take the final year examinations which consist of:

- Medicine and allied subjects (Part I & II)
- Surgery and allied subjects (Part I & II)
- Obstetrics and Gynecology
- Pediatrics

== Recognition ==
MCOMS is recognised by the Medical Council of Nepal, Sri Lanka, and other countries. It is also recognized by WHO and under FAIMER.

== Hospital ==
Manipal Teaching Hospital (MTH) is a 700-bedded hospital, located at Phulbari, Pokhara. The 5-storey hospital building houses an extensive medical library, students classrooms, a canteen, the main atrium, an auditorium along with outpatient departments and inpatient wards. All the medical students and faculty reside close by in other buildings.

=== Treatment cost ===
Treatment cost is reasonably affordable. Most tests and interventions are cheaper than that of government hospitals. There is also a Poor Patients' Fund (PPF) that provides free treatment to poor patients.

=== Poor Patients' Fund (PPF) ===
Also known as Asha, the PPF is an NGO managed by the students (mainly the 5th semester students). Funds are raised by the students by various means such as organizing movie shows, dances, college fetes, sales of T-shirts and sweat shirts, donations from the students and faculty, etc. The fund supports the cost of treatment of those patients who are unable to afford it themselves.

== Criticism and Controversies ==
Medical education in Nepal is highly controversial as many qualified students are turned away in lieu of competitive marks. Corruption is rampant with schools accepting students based on connections to established figures or illicit donations made to the school. The "hidden" tuition, as it's referred, is the additional cost of bribing officials in the education and healthy ministry with some students paying triple the tuition fees for enrollment.

Dr. Govinda KC is a staunch supporter of medical education reform in Nepal and has long advocated to break the education "mafia" present in the system.
