= DMI =

DMI may refer to:

== Organizations ==
- Dairy Management Inc.
- Danish Meteorological Institute
- Data Management Inc., a time-and-attendance software company
- Dead Man Incorporated, a predominantly white prison-gang formed in Maryland
- Development Media International, an organization that runs media campaigns to promote healthy behavior
- Dhulikhel Medical Institute, in Nepal
- Digital Manga, Inc.
- Drum Major Institute, a non-profit American progressive think tank and community action group
- Dubai Media Incorporated, owned by the government of the Emirate of Dubai

=== Fictional organizations ===
- Dunder Mifflin Paper Company, Inc., from the sitcom series The Office

== Science and technology ==
- Deferred maintenance item, in aviation upkeep
- Desktop Management Interface, a computer-software framework for managing components
- Digital Media Initiative, a cancelled technology project run by the BBC from 2008 to 2013
- Direct manipulation interface, a style of human-computer interaction
- Direct Media Interface, an interconnection between the CPU and the southbridge in Intel chipsets
- Dry matter intake, an animal's feed intake excluding its water content
- Dzyaloshinskii-Moriya Interaction, an interaction between neighboring magnetic spins
- 1,3-Dimethyl-2-imidazolidinone, in chemistry, an aprotic solvent

== Other uses ==
- Des Moines, Iowa
- Directorate of Military Intelligence (United Kingdom), a department of the British War Office until 1964
- Dominica, UNDP country code
- Fictional stock symbol for Dunder Mifflin Paper Company, Inc., a fictional paper company on the American television show The Office
