= Physiotherapy in Nepal =

Nepal currently only has two physiotherapy programs, available through Kathmandu University and Pokhara University as a bachelor's degree. It is equivalent to four-and-a-half years of full-time study. The minimum level of education to start this program is upper secondary. While there were only around 30 graduates with a Bachelor in Physiotherapy degree in 2007, the total number of graduates have now proliferated over the years. In 2022, several Nepalese physiotherapists have now completed PhD from reputed universities around the globe. Nepal also has a three-year Certificate level Physiotherapy degree which produces Physiotherapy Assistant who have limited scope of practice to Physiotherapists with a Bachelor or master's degree.

== Practicing physical therapists ==
The title for a practicing therapist is Physiotherapist and भौतिक चिकित्सक (Vautik Chikitshak) (protected by law).

According to the World Physiotherapy there are an estimated 2,506 practicing physiotherapists as of 30 June 2024 i.e. 0.81 physiotherapist per 10000 population and 43% of them are female. There are 603 members of the national organization, 52% of them are female. The World Physiotherapy reports that there a total of 153,830 members for the Asian, Western, and Pacific region of the organization. Support personnel are part of the workforce. To practice as a physiotherapist registration is required. To get registration, physiotherapist must apply to the Nepal Health professional Health Council with academic documents or citizenship applied for both national and overseas physiotherapist.

== Regulation ==
The scope of practice is defined by the Ministry of Health, and has a regulated code of conduct via Nepal Health Professional Council (NHPC). There is no legislation to prevent private practice clinics, but patients have direct access, meaning they can self-refer to private practice clinics without referral from another health care professional.

A physical therapist's scope in Nepal permits:

- Assessing patients/clients
- Making a diagnosis
- Treatment (interventions, advice, and evaluation of outcome)
- Referrals to other specialists/services
- Offering preventative advice/services

Registration is required to practice as a licensed physiotherapist in Nepal. All physiotherapists must register with the National Health Professional Council Under the current code of ethics, continuing professional development is not required for re-registration and membership; however, an amendment to the code of ethics requires mandatory evidence proving continuing professional development.

== Role of physiotherapy after the earthquake ==
On April 25 and May 12, 2015, two major earthquakes measuring 7.8 and 7.3 on the Richter scale struck Nepal. Out of the 77 districts of Nepal, 14 were severely affected by the earthquakes with an estimated 8,600 deaths, 22,000 injuries and 505,000 homes completely destroyed. Post-disaster, health care facilities faced shortages in space and resources. Furthermore, patients facing discharge after acute care faced challenges of accessibility living in remote locations with limited health care services especially those requiring ongoing rehabilitation. Natural elements such as monsoon season, floods, and landslides made access even more difficult post-earthquake.

Common injuries included trauma from falling debris and houses collapsing due to poor building construction and high population density. 70% of injuries were fractures with a large number of patients suffering spinal cord injuries (200–300), amputations (40–60) as well as traumatic brain injuries, crush injuries and neuropraxia.

During the time of the earthquake, 393 physiotherapists were registered with the majority of therapists located in Kathmandu. The role of physical therapist in disaster response was poorly defined as the profession is still relatively new. Many physical therapists at the time worked in facilities treating patients with musculoskeletal conditions followed by neurology and rehabilitation with a small number in intensive care-unit, obstetrics and pediatrics.

In response to the earthquake, physical therapists worked alongside doctors, nurses and other heath providers overseeing triage, screening and acute care management of patients. This includes procedures like brace fitting, applying plaster cases, temporary backslabs, skin traction for femoral fractures and hip dislocations, dressing wounds, fitting assistive devices. Physiotherapists also mobilized patients, prescribed exercises, re-positioned patients to prevent secondary complications such as bed sores and chest complications post-surgery or prolonged bed rest.
