= Bachelor of Business Information Systems =

Academic degree

Occupation
- Names: Business Information Systems
- Occupation type: Management Information Technology
- Activity sectors: Information technology, Technology industry, Business industry
- Specialty: Business Administration, Information Systems, software programming, Project Management, Information Technology Management

Description
- Competencies: Technical knowledge, Management knowledge, Technology Management
- Fields of employment: Management, Technology, Entrepreneurship, System/Business Analyst, IT manager, Software designer, Web developer, Business Administration

Bachelor of Business Information Systems (BBIS), also Business Information Systems (BIS), is an information technology (IT) and management focused undergraduate program designed to better understand the needs of rapidly growing technology in business and IT sector. It is bachelor degree that combines elements of business administration and computer science with majoring on information systems and technology.The purpose of this course is to equip students with the skills and knowledge needed to effectively manage and utilize information technology in a business and IT industry.

== International variations ==
=== Australia ===
It is offered by Asia Pacific International College (APIC), Kent Institute Australia, Swinburne University of Technology, RMIT University, La Trobe University, Melbourne Institute of Technology, Monash University, Open Universities Australia, Sydney International School of Technology and Commerce and Torrens University Australia. In Australia, it is a 3-years program.

=== Germany ===
Hanover University of Applied Sciences and Arts offers a highly recognized Bachelor of Science in the field of Business Information Systems, ranking in Germanys Top 10. Furtwangen University of Applied Sciences in Germany offers International Business Information Systems a leading bachelor study program in Germany educating students in three fields of competence: Applied Computer Science, Digital Business Management and Data Science & Artificial Intelligence.

=== Pakistan ===
The Bachelor of Business Information Systems (BBIS) degree is offered by several institutions in Pakistan, including the Institute of Business Administration (IBA) and the Shaheed Zulfikar Ali Bhutto Institute of Science and Technology (SZABIST), both located in Karachi. And in Lahore, the Lahore University of Management Sciences (LUMS), the Lahore School of Economics (LSE), the University of the Punjab, and the University of Management and Technology (UMT). In the capital city of Islamabad, students can pursue a BBIS degree at the NUST Business School (NBS), the COMSATS Institute of Information Technology, the Pakistan Institute of Engineering and Applied Sciences (PIEAS), and Quaid-i-Azam University. Other notable institutions offering the program include Sukkur IBA University in Sukkur, the Institute of Management Sciences (IMS) in Peshawar, the Karachi School for Business and Leadership (KSBL) in Karachi, the University of Karachi, and the University of Engineering and Technology (UET) in Lahore.

=== India ===
In India, it is known as Bachelor of Science (Business Information System) which is offered by Hindustan Institute of Technology and Management and FTMS Global Academy India Private Limited.

=== Nepal ===
BBIS program is offered by Kathmandu University under the Department of Management Informatics and Communication, School of Management and Little Angels College of Management (LACM). LACM is affiliated to Kathmandu University.

It is a 4-year bachelor degree program. The course is divided into 8 semester and 18 credit hours in each semester with 6 subject from first to seventh semester and 15 credit hours with five subjects in 8 semesters.

=== Singapore ===
Murdoch University offers Bachelor of Science in Business Information Systems in Singapore.

=== Sri Lanka ===
The Department of Information Technology, Faculty of Management Studies and Commerce, University of Sri Jayewardenepura offers the Batchelor of Science in Business Information Systems in Sri Lanka.

=== United States ===
University of Arizona Global Campus offers online course in Bachelor of Arts in Business Information Systems.

== Scope and career prospects ==
A typical role for BBIS graduates is systems analyst, where the graduates can apply their expertise in analyzing business information system requirements and system deployment methods. This program prepares for the graduates to be the Information Systems professionals and they can work as a Database Administrator (DBA), Chief Information Officer (CIO) and other senior management positions with additional work experience and professional development.

They can also work as Business Analyst, IT Project Manager, IT Consultant, IT Technical Support Officer, Programmer and Designer, Applications Developer, Network Administrator, Computer System Auditor, Computer System Engineer, Data Modeller, Database Designer and Administrator, Electronic Commerce Administrator, Hardware Technician, Business Process Analyst, Enterprise System Analyst, Information and Data Manager, Information Management Administrator, Information Manager, Management Consultant, Sales Representative, Specialist Consultant, System Designer, Training and Support Leader and Training Manager.

== See also ==
- Bachelor of Information technology management
- Bachelor of Business Administration
- Bachelor of computer science
- Bachelor of Information Technology
- Management information systems
