= Council for Technical Education and Vocational Training =

- प्राविधिक शिक्षा तथा व्यावसायिक तालिम परिषद्
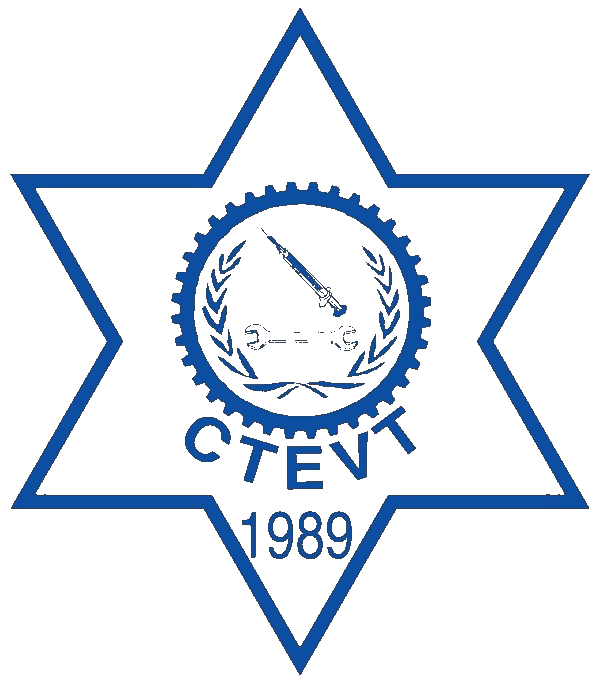
- Formation: 23 February 1989 (37 years ago)
- Type: Autonomous public institution
- Headquarters: Sanothimi, Bhaktapur
- Coordinates: 27.682°N 85.3745°E
- Chairperson: Hon. Bidya Bhattarai
- Parent organisation: Ministry of Education
- Affiliations: 1169 colleges & schools across Nepal
- Website: https://ctevt.org.np/

Council for Technical Education and Vocational Training or simply CTEVT (Nepali: प्राविधिक शिक्षा तथा व्यावसायिक तालिम परिषद्) is an educational organization in Nepal responsible for managing and developing technical education and vocational training. Established in 1989 (2045 BS) with the motto "Skilling Nepal for People's Prosperity", and operates under the Ministry of Education, Science, and Technology. It has seven provincial offices and a head office in Sanothimi, Bhaktapur. CTEVT offers 49 diploma and 33 pre-diploma courses through its 1169 affiliated schools and colleges across Nepal, playing a crucial role in producing skilled human resources for various industries. While it is not a traditional school or university, CTEVT manages and affiliates various educational institutions, providing different diploma and pre-diploma programs. So far, 504,103 students have graduated from CTEVT-affiliated colleges.
