= Bachelor of Business Administration =

Academic degree

A Bachelor of Business Administration (BBA) is an undergraduate degree in business administration awarded by colleges and universities after completion of four years and typically 120 credits of undergraduate study in the fundamentals of business administration.

== Curriculum structure ==
The degree is designed to give a broad knowledge of the functional aspects of a company and their interconnection, while also allowing specialization in a particular business-related academic discipline. BBA programs expose students to a range of core subjects and generally allow students to specialize in a specific business-related academic discipline or disciplines.

The BBA degree also develops a student's practical, managerial, and communication skills, and business decision-making capabilities that prepare them for the management of a business entity. Many programs incorporate training and practical experience in the form of case projects, presentations, internships, industrial visits, and interaction with established industry experts.

General educational requirements emphasize humanities and social sciences, including history, economics, and literature. Core mathematics curriculum are usually required and business-related, including quantitative mathematics, accounting, statistics, and related courses. Calculus and business statistics are usually required.

The Bachelor of Science in Business Administration (BSBA) is a quantitative variant of the BBA. General educational requirements are even more mathematics-oriented; furthermore, the general focus within business may also be more analytic, often allowing additional quantitative optional coursework.

== Accreditation ==
Particularly in the United States, undergraduate business administration programs are almost always accredited, which represents that the college or university's BBA program meets curriculum quality standards.

== See also ==
- Bachelor of Business Information Systems
- Bachelor of Commerce
- Bachelor of Economics
- Bachelor of Finance
- Master of Business Administration
- Business education § Undergraduate education
