= Dhulikhel Hospital =

Hospital in Kavrepalanchok, Nepal

Dhulikhel Hospital (Kathmandu University Hospital)
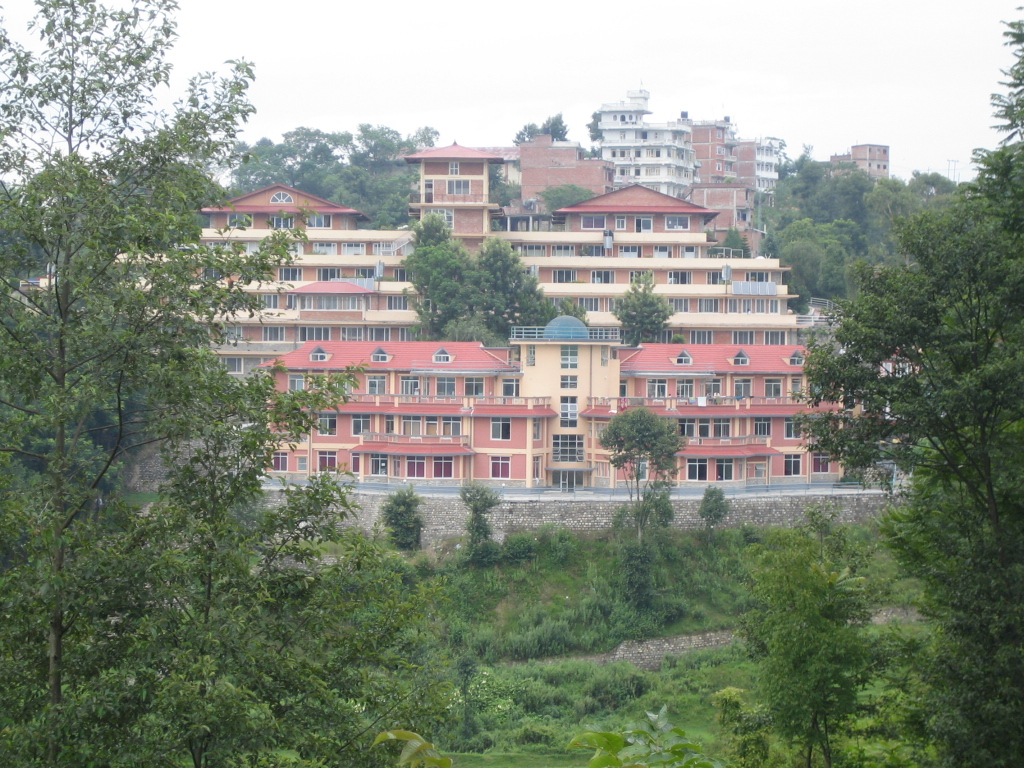
- Independent

Geography
- Location: Dhulikhel, Kavrepalanchok District, Nepal
- Coordinates: 27°37′00.4″N 85°32′49.5″E

Organisation
- Care system: Private
- Type: Teaching

Services
- Emergency department: Yes
- Beds: 475
- Speciality: GI Surgery, Gastroscopy, Spine Surgery, Urology, Otology

History
- Founded: 1996

Links
- Website: www.dhulikhelhospital.org
- Lists: Hospitals in Nepal

Dhulikhel Hospital (Kathmandu University Hospital) is an independent, not for profit, non-government hospital in Dhulikhel, Kavrepalanchok, Nepal.

== History ==
The hospital was conceived and supported by the Dhulikhel community, as a health service provider. The hospital was inaugurated by the late king Birendra Bir Bikram Shah Dev in 1996, as a collaborative project of the Dhulikhel Municipality, NepaliMed and Dhulikhel Health Service Association. The hospital was started to provide outpatient service, 24 hours emergency, inpatient from beginning. Dr. Ram KM Shrestha is a founder of the hospital who started this hospital to provide quality healthcare service to all.

== Service area ==
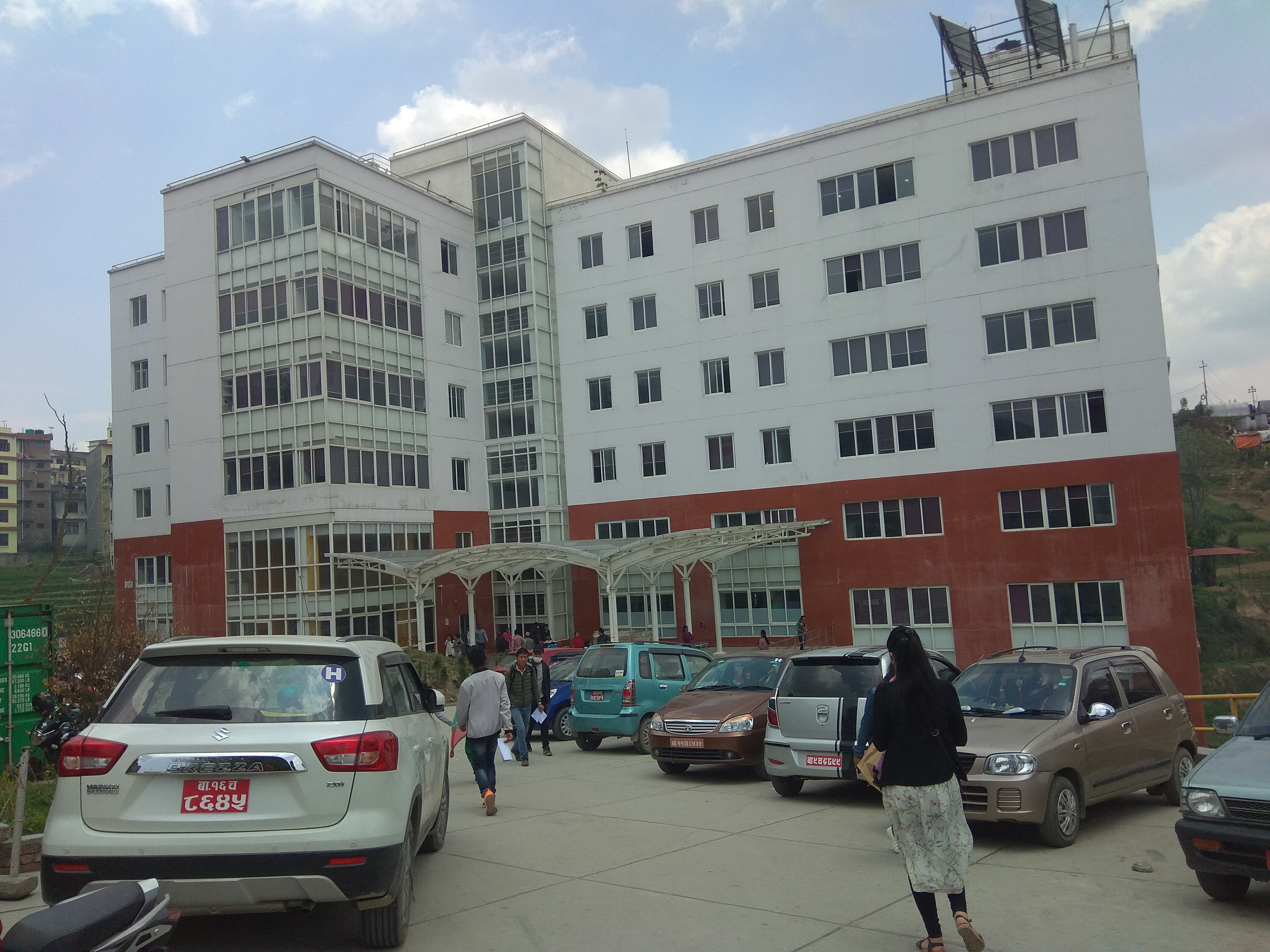
Dhulikhel Hospital new building

Dhulikhel Hospital serves a vast population of approximately 2.7 million people across multiple districts, including Bhaktapur, Dolakha, Kavrepalanchowk, Ramechhap, Sindhupalchok, Sindhuli, Kathmandu, Lalitpur, and neighboring areas. Its impact extends beyond these regions, as it has provided medical services to individuals from more than 50 of Nepal's 75 districts. Each year, the hospital continues to be a vital healthcare provider for communities in need across the country. There are significant number of cases referred from different parts of the country. Since opening of Banepa Bardibas highway connecting eastern Terai, the number of patients from Terain region has significantly increased.

== University Hospital ==
Dhulikhel Hospital, in collaboration with Kathmandu University, established the Kathmandu University School of Medical Sciences, serving as a university hospital for all medical programs. The institution offers a range of medical courses, including MBBS, BDS, BSc Nursing, BNS, BPT, and MD/MS across various specialties, contributing to the advancement of healthcare education and services in Nepal.

== Community Health ==
=== Department of Community Programs ===
The department has expanded since 1996. It now works as a coordinating unit between the hospital's various medical departments and numerous rural communities that previously had no access to immediate healthcare facilities. The department attempts to address health issues in remote areas through a holistic approach; quality service delivery; rational community-based methods; innovative public health interventions; and effective partnership programs. It aims to implement these measures and services through rigorous monitoring and evaluation methods, in order to ensure that its main objective, to act as a coordinating unit for other departments in the hospital, is successfully carried out.

Currently, the work of the Department of Community Programmes can be categorised as the following:

- Health Service Programmes
- Public Health Programmes
- Partnership Programmes
- Global Health Programmes

Majority of the work of the Department of Community Programs is carried out by the outreach centers. At the 14 outreach centers and one school health clinic round-the-clock healthcare services are provided to the people living in the catchment areas. All of these outreach centers were started after thorough discussions and meetings addressing the community directly about their needs, aims, and goals concerning healthcare. The outreaches not only provide basic health services, but also a platform on which all the community programs begin. Many preventive, promotive and curative services are provided to all outreach rural communities. Various NGOs and INGOs also provide services to the community at grassroots level through the outreach centers.

=== Outreach Centres ===
==== Kavrepalanchok District ====
1. Baluwa Health Centre
2. Bolde Phediche Health Centre
3. Dapcha Health Centre
4. Kattike Deurali Health Centre
5. Salambu Health Centre
6. Dhungkharka Health Centre

==== Sindhupalchok District ====
1. Bahunepati Health Centre
2. Hindi Health Centre
3. Manekharka Health Centre
4. Lamosangu Temporary Basic Health Care Unit
5. Yangrima School Health Clinic

==== Dhading District ====
1. Chattre Deurali Health Centre

==== Lalitpur District ====
1. Godamchaur Health Centre

==== Solukhumbu District ====
1. Kharikhola Health Centre
2. Dorpu Health Centre

==== Dolakha District ====
1. Kirnetar Health Centre
2. Gaurishankar Community General Hospital

==== Parbat District ====
1. Phalebas Health Centre

==== Nuwakot District ====
1. Thansing Health Centre

==== Sindhuli District ====
1. Dumja Health Centre

=== Partnership Programs ===
In addition to training the hospital's own staff at the Outreach Centes, training courses for health personnel from government health centres are also conducted. The partnership work covers other areas of Nepal. Technical assistance is provided to eight hospitals all over the Nepal.

The partners include:

1. Ampipal Hospital, Gorkha District
2. Tamakoshi Cooperative Hospital, Ramechhap District
3. Dolpa Health Centre, Dolpa District
4. Sahaj Community Hospital, Nawalparasi District
5. Poyan Health Centre, Solukhumbhu District
6. Phalebas Health Centre, Parbat District
7. Necha Health Centre, Okhaldhunga District
8. Bayalpata Hospital, Achham District

=== Public Health Programs ===
Through the Department of Community Programs, the staff at the Dhulikhel Hospital coordinate many [public health] programs designed to uplift communities by improving their standard of living. Various public health programs have been conducted: plantation programs around schools and villages; first aid training; hygiene and sanitation teaching for school children; awareness programs for women (for issues like cervical cancer, breast cancer, uterine prolapse); and mental health awareness programs for both women and school children.

Current Public Health Programs include:

1. Plantation Programs and Community Forestry
2. Micro-Finance Programs
3. Micro-Insurance Programs
4. Women's Awareness Programs
5. School Health Programs
6. Occupational Health Programs
7. Improved Cooking Stoves Construction

==== Plantation Programs and Community Forestry ====
Plantation programs is one of the Department of Community Programs' newest initiatives. The program raises awareness on deforestation and climate change in the rural communities and incorporates awareness campaigns into local school curricula. Thus far, two schools have been involved and more than 1,005 trees have been planted.

==== Micro-Finance Programs ====
The Micro-Finance program was in 2008 at the Bahunepati Health Centre. Today, Dhulikhel Hospital has 31 micro-finance groups in five outreach centers (Bahunepati, Kattike Deurali, Dapcha, Solombhu, Baluwa).

The micro-finance programs were created to financially assist women in rural communities. Each micro-finance group consists of 10 women with a nominated leader from their own community, who ensures that the loan is paid back in monthly installments, with an additional four percent interest rate. The interest in turn generates a sum of money for another woman to join the group. The women from the micro-finance groups have gone on to purchase animals for livestock farming such as pigs, goats, and chickens; or have invested in materials to start their own small businesses like candle-making. To date, over 300 women have benefited from the program.

==== Micro-insurance Programs ====
Micro-insurance Programs were launched at the end of 2010. For just 50 rupees per month, the Micro-insurance Program has ensured that all the women involved in the micro-finance programs and their children are covered for basic medical healthcare.

==== Women's Awareness Programs ====
The staff from the Department of Community Programs and the Gynaecology/Obstetrics department work together within the outreach centers to find out the needs of women and how they can be helped.

In 2011-2012 a total of 29,681 women from different rural vicinities were involved in the Awareness Programs. The major topics discussed were: cervical cancer, uterine prolapse, breast cancer, menstural hygiene, and tuberculosis.

The Department of Community Programs is also raising awareness on teenage pregnancies, dysmenorrhoea, family planning, and sexually transmitted infections.

Dhulikhel Hospital operates on all uterine prolapse cases without charge. Due to societal restrictions many women in rural areas do not talk about their cases and cases often come to the hospital with stage three uterine prolapse. Since 2008, the department has specifically recruited nurses from the hospital for awareness programs on uterine prolapse in the outreach centers.

==== School Health Programs ====
This program through education highlights the importance of hygiene and healthcare for school children and teachers. The School Health Programs are focused on encouraging education on topics such as hygiene, toilet use, and first aid.

Working with the District Government Office, Adolescent Health Programs and extra-curricular School Health Clubs have been formed. Furthermore, first aid trainings have been provided for teachers from 11 schools in cooperation with local governmental health center staff. Between 2011 and 2012 the re were 72 various health programs at 120 different schools. 10,9384 students were screened for dental, ENT, ophthalmic problems.

==== Occupational Health Programs ====
Farmers in Nepal face severe health risks due to their heavy use of pesticides in crop farming. The Department of Community Programs is conducting awareness programs targeting these farmers, with regards to the proper use of pesticides in crop farming. The program aims to first raise the issue of pesticides as a health hazard amongst farmers and their families, and then tackle the increasingly widespread and improper use of pesticides.

== See also ==
- List of hospitals in Nepal
