= Dhulikhel =

Municipality in Bagmati Province, Nepal

Dhulikhel धौख्यः Shikhalapur
- Municipality
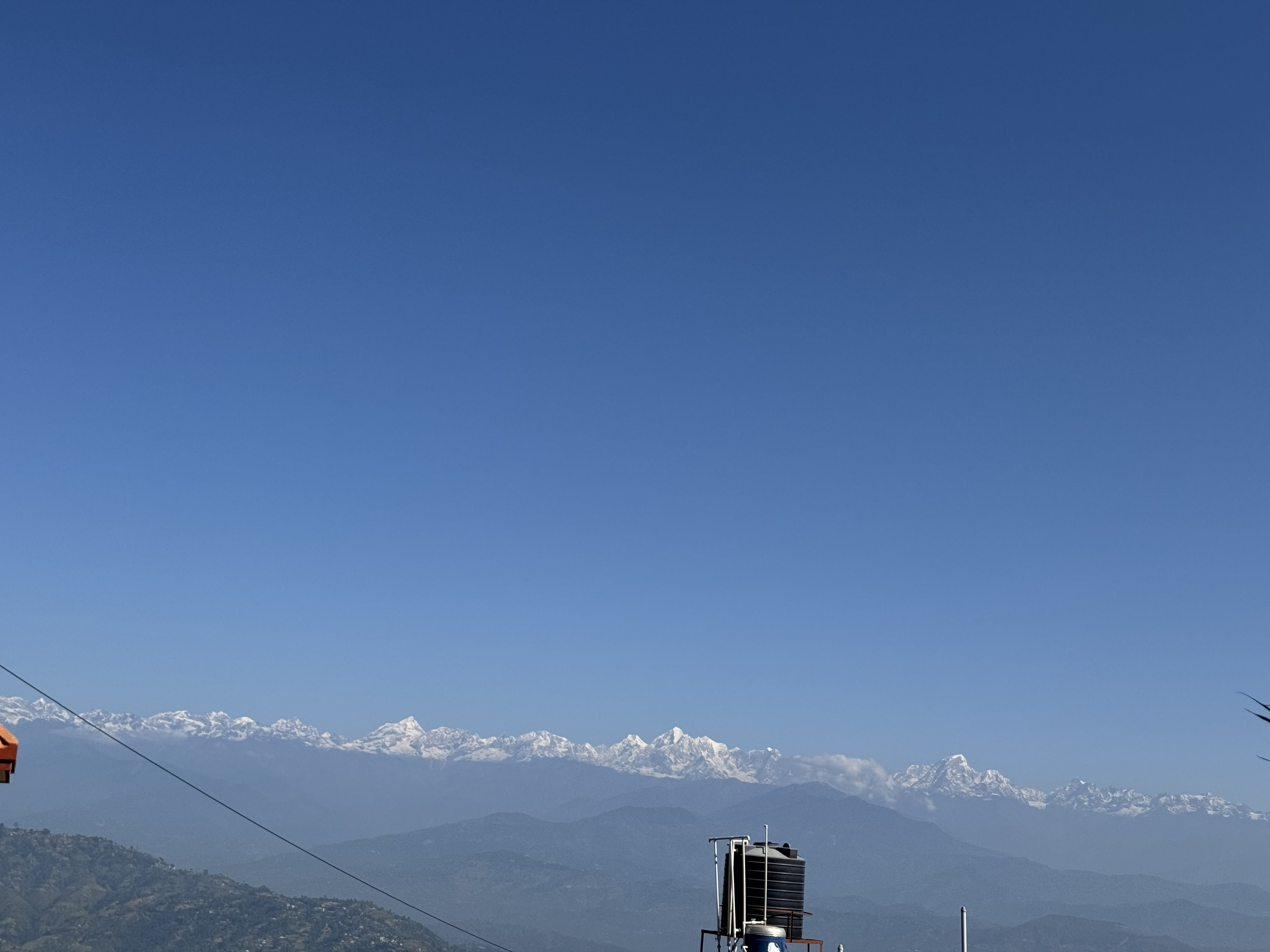
- Scenic view of mountains as seen from Dhulikhel

- Location in Nepal
- Coordinates: 27°37′06″N 85°33′07″E
- Country: Nepal
- Province: Bagmati
- District: Kavrepalanchok

Government
  - Mayor: Nirajan Jangam (acting)
  - Deputy Mayor: Nirajan Jangam (Congress)
  - Chief Administrative Officer: Mohan Prasad Marasini

Population (2011)
  - Total: 36,183
- Time zone: UTC+5:45 (NST)
- Postal code: 45210
- Area code: 011
- Website: www.dhulikhelmun.gov.np

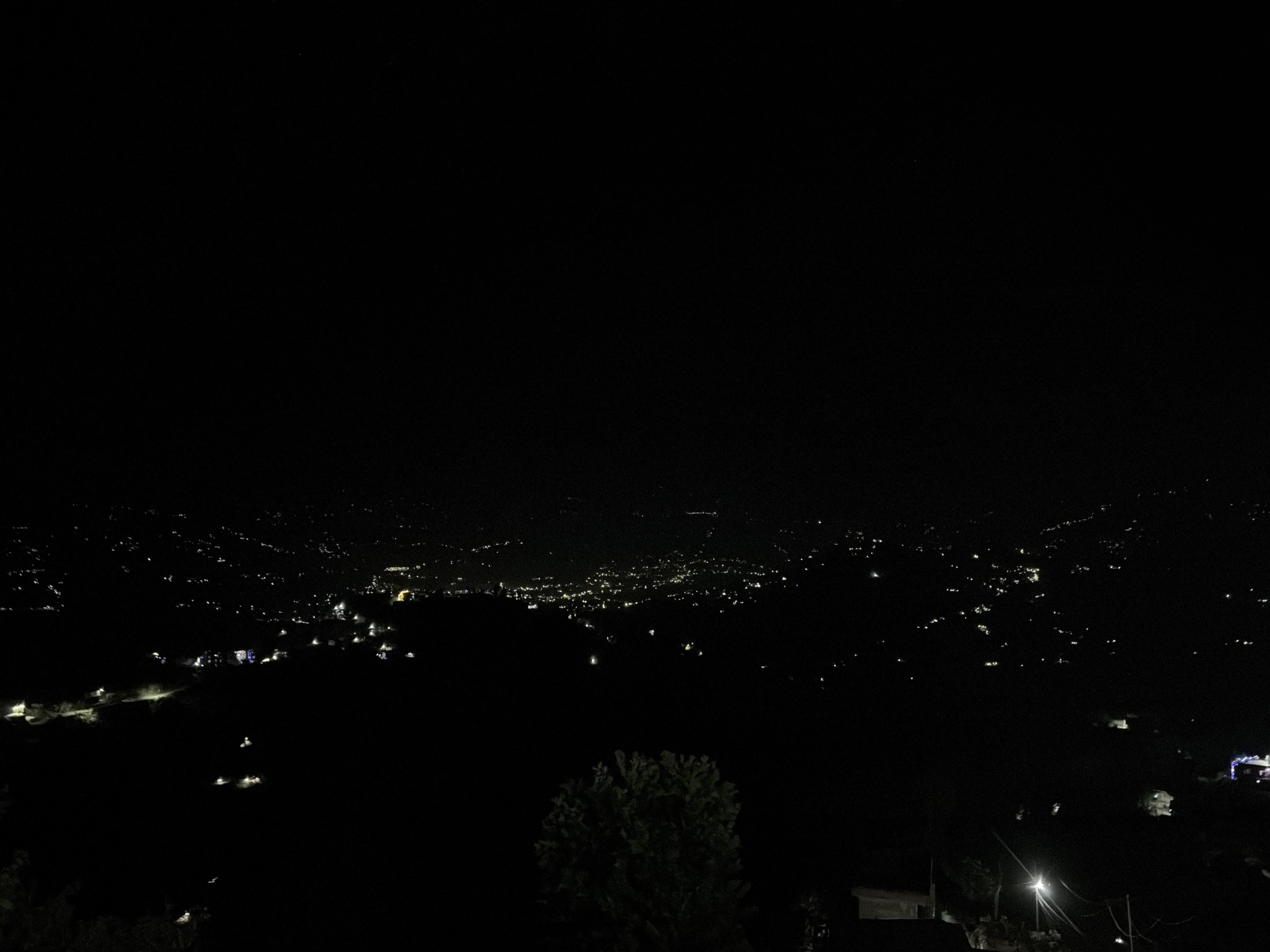
Night view of Dhulikhel

Dhulikhel (Nepali: धुलिखेल), also known as Dhaukhya (Nepal Bhasa: धौख्यः)as well as Shikhalapur(शिखलापुर), is a municipality in Kavrepalanchok District of Nepal. It is the district headquarters, from where two major highways, the B.P. Highway and the Araniko Highway passes through. Araniko Highway connects Kathmandu, Nepal's capital city with Tibet's border town of Kodari. Dhulikhel is located at the Eastern rim of Kathmandu Valley, south of the Himalayas at 1550m above sea level and is situated 30 km southeast of Kathmandu and 74 km southwest of Kodari. The majority of people in Dhulikhel are Newars, and Brahmin, Chhettri, Tamang and Dalit are also living in outer area of the town.

== Geography ==
Located 30 km to the east of Kathmandu valley, Dhulikhel Municipality was established on 2043/11/05 constituting 9 wards. At present, with the expansion of area, the municipality consists of 12 wards covering a total of 54.62 km^{2}.

Dhulikhel Municipality receives an annual rainfall of 1500mm. The average temperature of 20 C makes it a treat for tourists especially in the summer season.

As per the figures of Central Bureau of Statistics Total population of Dhulikhel Municipality is 33,981 with 16,675 male and 17306 female. The population density is 582 per km^{2}. with an average growth rate of 0.65. There are 7039 Households with average size of 4.5.

Dhulikhel Municipality boasts as a major touristic destination with attractions that range from natural scenario to cultural and historical elements. One can view the Himalayan range at an 180^{o} panoramic view of mountains including Mt. Annapurna, Mt. Ganesh Himal, Mt. Langtang, Mt. Phuribichyachu, Mt. Gaurishankar, Mt. Lhotse among others. Other natural attractions include locations like Tundikhel plus cultural and religious sites like Bhagawati, Kalidevi, Gita Mandir, Gaukhureshwor.

== History ==
The name Dhulikhel originates from the Nepal Bhasha word dhali_khela, which is the earlier form of the present Nepal Bhasha name dhau_khyo. Dhali or dhau means 'yogurt' and khela or khyo means 'field' in Nepala Bhasha. It is said to have come from the Lichchhi name Dhawalasrotapura. Dhulikhel was the eastern border of ancient Nepal Mandala, and it was one of the territories of Bhaktapur kingdom. Dhulikhel was among the last places to be annexed to the country Gorkha that was being expanded by Prithvi Narayan Shah. In his Itihas Prakash, Yogi Naraharinath, wrote about the difficulty Prithvi Narayan Shah faced in conquering Dhulikhel.

Until B.S. 1972, administrative center of Kavrepalanchok was at Chautara. Then, it shifted to Banepa until B.S. 1980 after which it subsequently shifted to Dhulikhel which stands till date.

== Demographics ==
At the time of the 2011 Nepal census, Dhulikhel Municipality had a population of 34,142. Of these, 58.6% spoke Nepali, 22.9% Tamang, 17.0% Newar, 0.3% Magar, 0.3% Maithili, 0.2% Rai, 0.1% Bhojpuri, 0.1% Hindi, 0.1% Sunuwar, 0.1% Thangmi, 0.1% Tharu and 0.1% other languages as their first language.

In terms of ethnicity/caste, 26.7% were Hill Brahmin, 23.4% Tamang, 19.1% Newar, 16.3% Chhetri, 2.9% Sarki, 2.7% Magar, 2.0% Kami, 1.3% Damai/Dholi, 1.3% Thakuri, 0.9% Gharti/Bhujel, 0.6% other Dalit, 0.5% Rai, 0.5% Sanyasi/Dasnami, 0.3% Gurung, 0.2% Thami, 0.2% Tharu, 0.1% Hajam/Thakur, 0.1% Majhi, 0.1% Musalman, 0.1% Pahari, 0.1% Sunuwar, 0.1% Yadav and 0.3% others.

In terms of religion, 74.8% were Hindu, 21.6% Buddhist, 3.2% Christian, 0.1% Muslim and 0.3% others.

In terms of literacy, 74.9% could read and write, 2.2% could only read and 22.9% could neither read nor write.

== Educational institutions ==
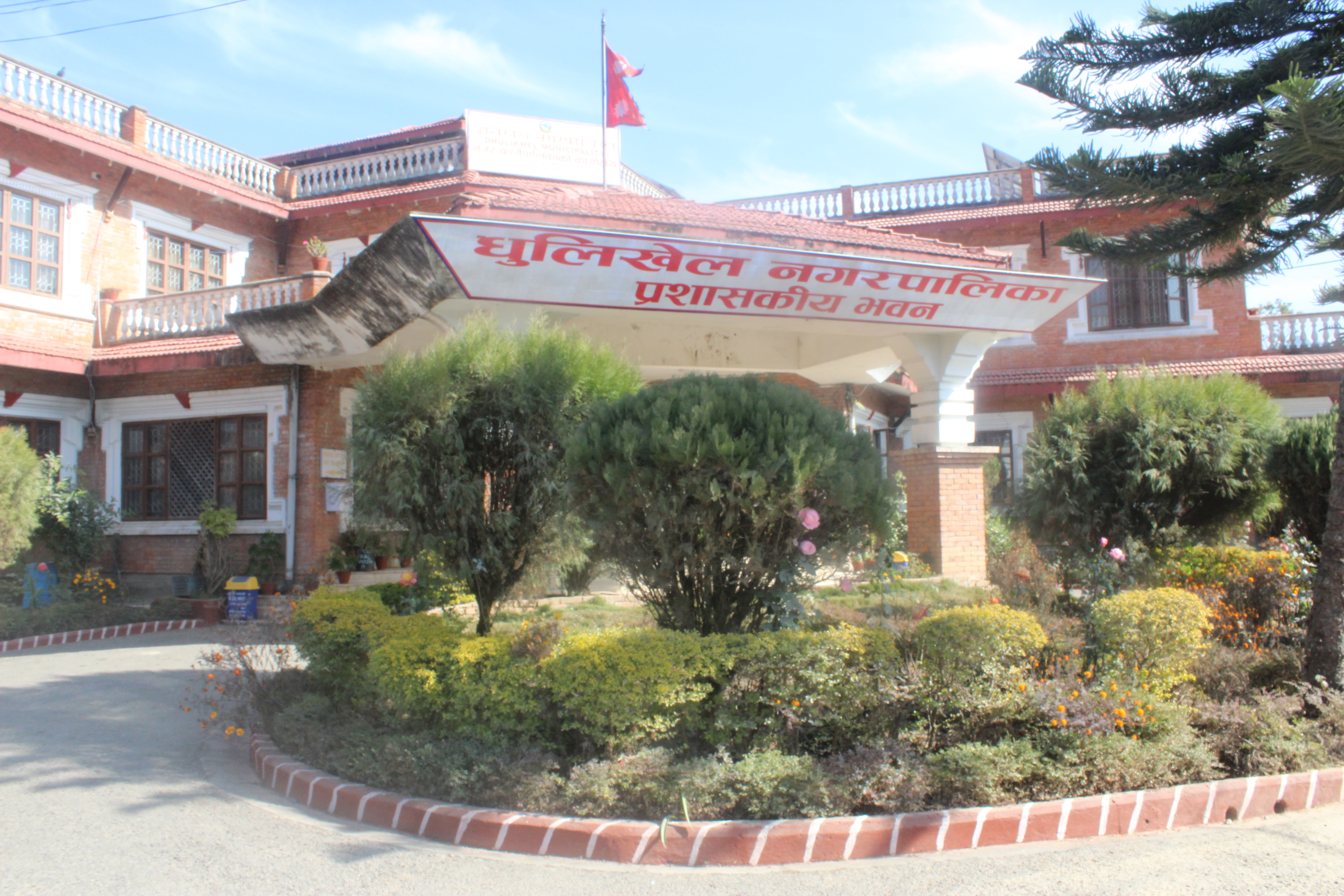
Dhulikhel Municipality Administrative Building

Dhulikhel Municipality has plenty education institutes, including a university, Kathmandu University. The number of basic education schools are 24 and 6 as run by Government and Private Institutions while Secondary Schools number are 11 and 8 respectively. There is also a school run by Monastery in the municipality. Altogether, there are 50 schools in the area. Like the national statistics in favor of literacy rate of men, Dhulikhel Municipality has 85.63% literate male population while the same rate is 65.77% for female, making up for a total literacy rate of 75.26%. School enrollment rate of 99% sees slightly higher rate than the national average of 96%. Of the total 37 early childhood education based establishments, 33 are school based while 4 are community based.

== State of residency ==
Dhulikhel Municipality has one hospital – Dhulikhel Hospital. In addition, there is a Primary Health Center, 6 Health Posts including 3 Urban Health Posts.

81.4% of the residents of the municipality have access to pipeline water supply, a figure slightly better than the national average of 80%. Among the total households 64.23% (4522 HHs) are equipped with toilet while the remaining 35.76% (2518 HHs).

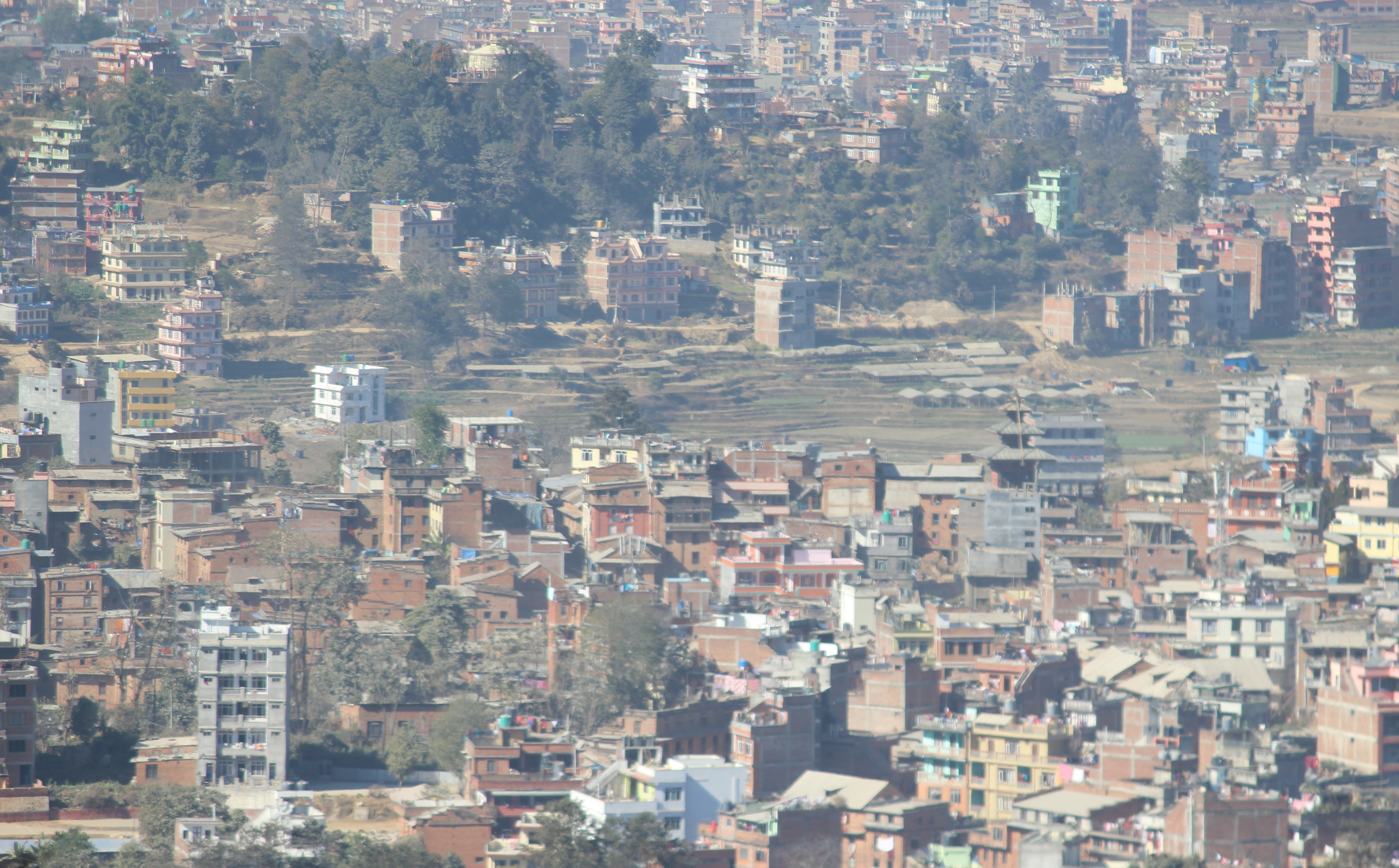
Dhulikhel as seen from Kali temple atop 1000 Sindhi

Residents of Dhulikhel Municipality use a number of sources of fuel for cooking, with traditional source, i.e., Firewood forming the largest chunk, 60.47%. Next are other non-renewable sources of fuel, Kerosene and LP Gas, constituting to 29.84%. Guitha, locally made produce, addresses the need of 5.28% population while the remaining 4.41% use electricity for the cooking purpose. The number of households using improved cooking stoves (ICS) is 1645 (23.37%). This has helped reduce the carbon emission while making the use of the resources efficiently.

There are 4 FM Radios based in Dhulikhel Municipality with a few more frequency also received in the area. The FM in Dhulikhel include Radio Namobuddha, Radio Madhyepurba, Grace FM, and Radio Sheferd.

Regarding the conduction of financial transactions, there are 7 Banks, including all categories of Financial Institutions. The Banks include Nabil Bank, Banijya Bank, Agriculture Bank, Century Bank, Civil Bank, Dev Development Bank and Naya Nepal laghubittya bikas Bank.

== Touristic activities ==
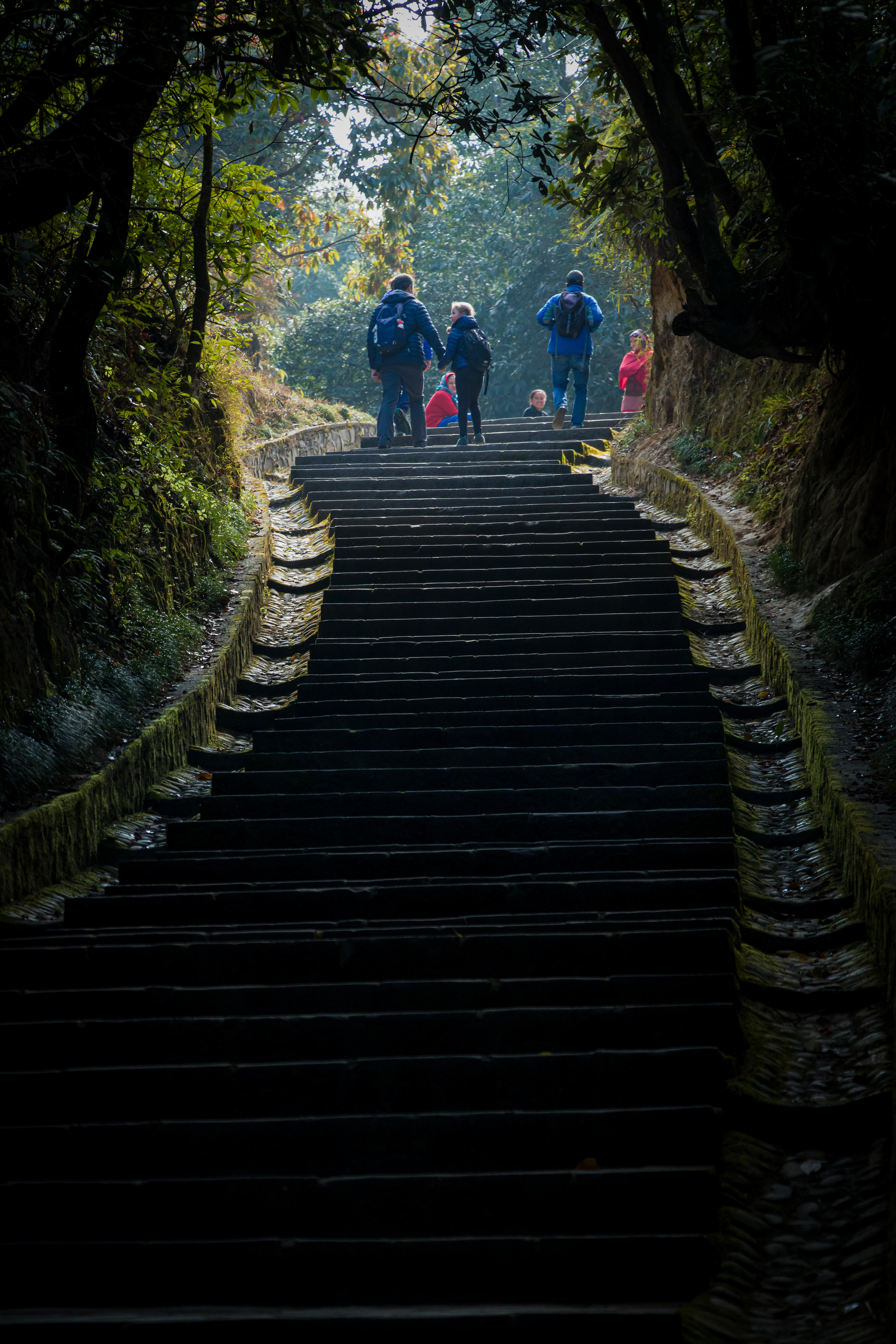
Hajar Sidhi, Dhulikhel, Nepal

Dhulikhel Municipality is a major part of the Kathmandu Valley Cultural Trekking Trail. This five-day trail provides a short trek with himalayas in the background and passes showcases a number of cultural highlights and rich biodiversity. Visits to hill stations like Chisapani, Nagarkot along with Dhulikhel will be less challenging than going to himalayas routes but with equal thrill and rewards. Dhulikhel municipality is one of the starting or the middle points for hiking routes. These include walks to Panauti, Kavre village, Opi village as well as to Hazaar Sindhi all of which take as long as a half day. A longer walking route includes trail to Nagarkot and Namobuddha. The Municipality also forms one of the points for Mountain Biking with challenging terrains as well as the site of people with rich ethnic culture and the scenery of mountain ranges along the way. Routes include Dhulikhel-Panauti, Dhulikhel-Khopasi, Dhulikhel-Palanchowk-Dhulikhel, Dhulikhel-Namobuddha-Dhulikhel.

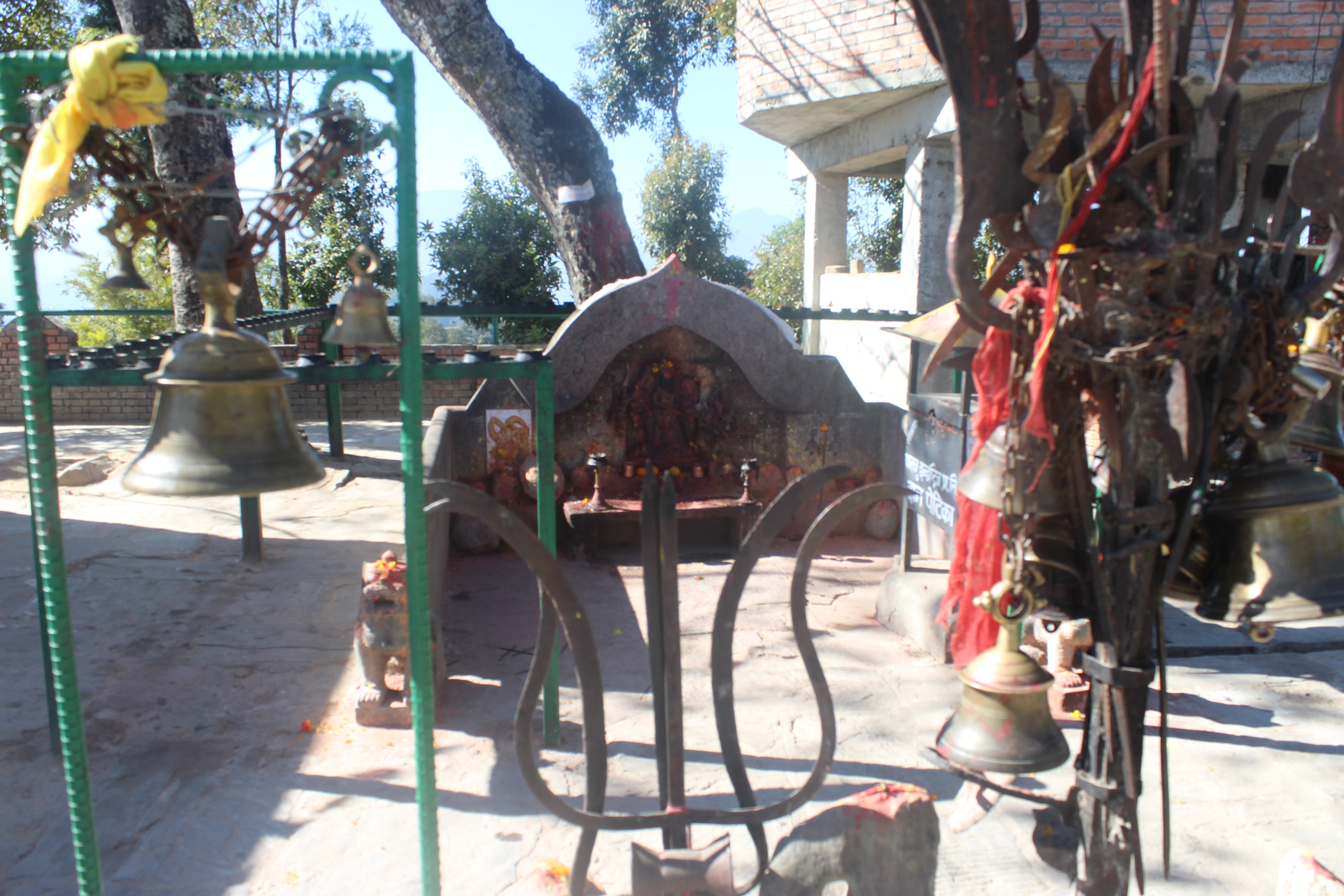
Kali Temple (Religious as well as Touristic Site)

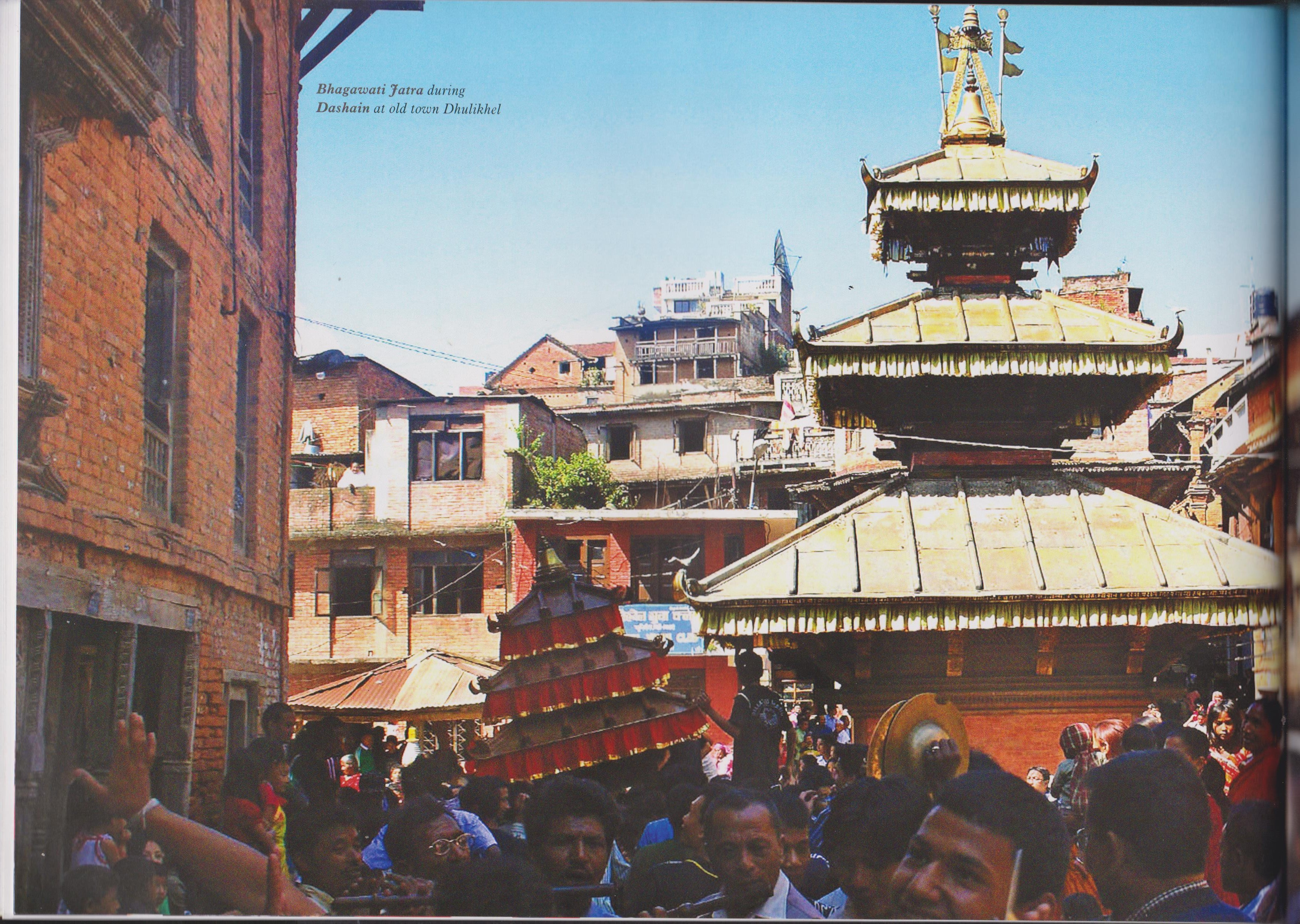
A scene during Dashain in the Bhagwati Jatra

One can also do activities like bird and butterfly watching from various points in Dhulikhel Municipality. Hazaar Sindhi stands out as the place, including Thulochaur Kavre, and Gosaikunda forest in the vicinity areas there as many as 72 species of birds (60% residents and 35% migratory) can be sighted.

Dhulikhel has been for centuries an important trading centre on the commercial route linking Nepal to Tibet. Since time immemorial, people of Nepal travel to Tibet to bring home salt and gold. Likewise, the Tibetans every year with their flocks of sheep enter into Nepal during Dashain, the greatest Hindu festival. They use to purchase chilies and other daily necessities in Nepal and return to their homeland. In those days, a whole-day walk from Kathmandu to Dhulikhel was comfortable for Tibetan trippers, with food and water easily available in Dhulikhel in the evening for an overnight stay. After adjoining Tibet by motorable road in 1965, Dhulikhel got a facelift and developed as a tourist destination. Dhulikhel is an ideal place to stop overnight while going to Tibet and returning to Kathmandu.

Dhulikel is known to offer panoramic views of the Himalayas as well as the surrounding green hills and traditional agricultural terraces.

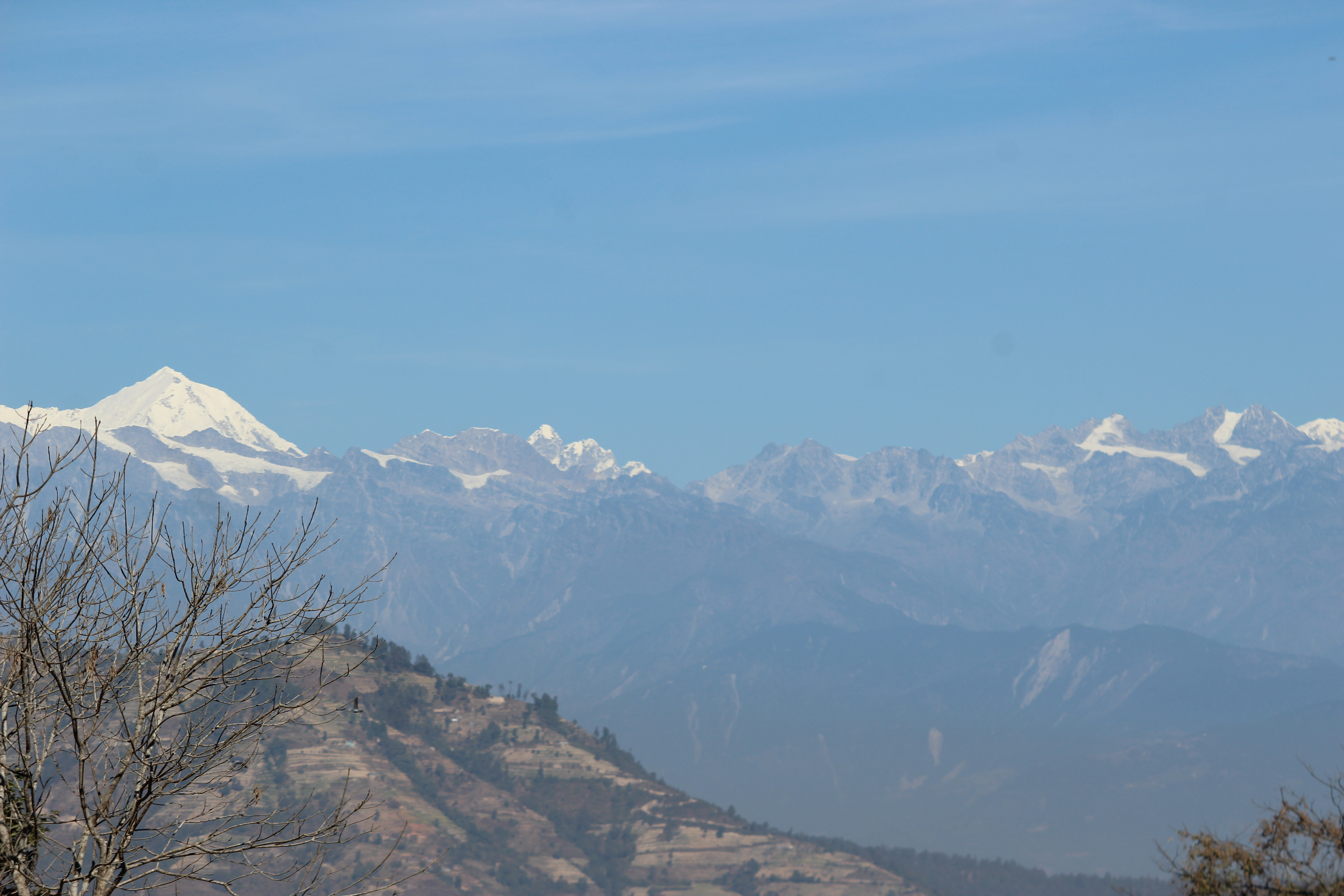
View of Mountain range can be seen on a clear day

Geographically, the plains rise gradually up to the green mountains and further into the snow-capped Himalayas. The panorama offers a view of the Himalayan ranges stretching from Mount Annapurna in the far west to Mount Karolung in the Far East. More than twenty Himalayan peaks including Mt. Annapurna (8091 m), Mt. Ganesh Himal (7429 m), Mt. Langtang (7234 m), Mt. Phuribichyachu (6637 m), Mt. Gaurishanker (7134 m), Mt. Lhotse (8516 m) and many others can be seen from Dhulikhel.

=== The Old Town ===
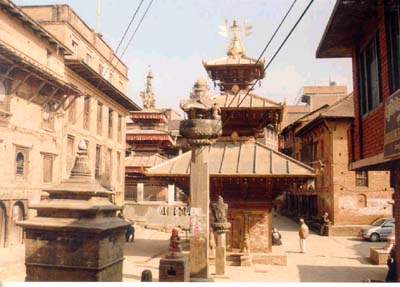
Majestic Narayanthan Square, Dutole

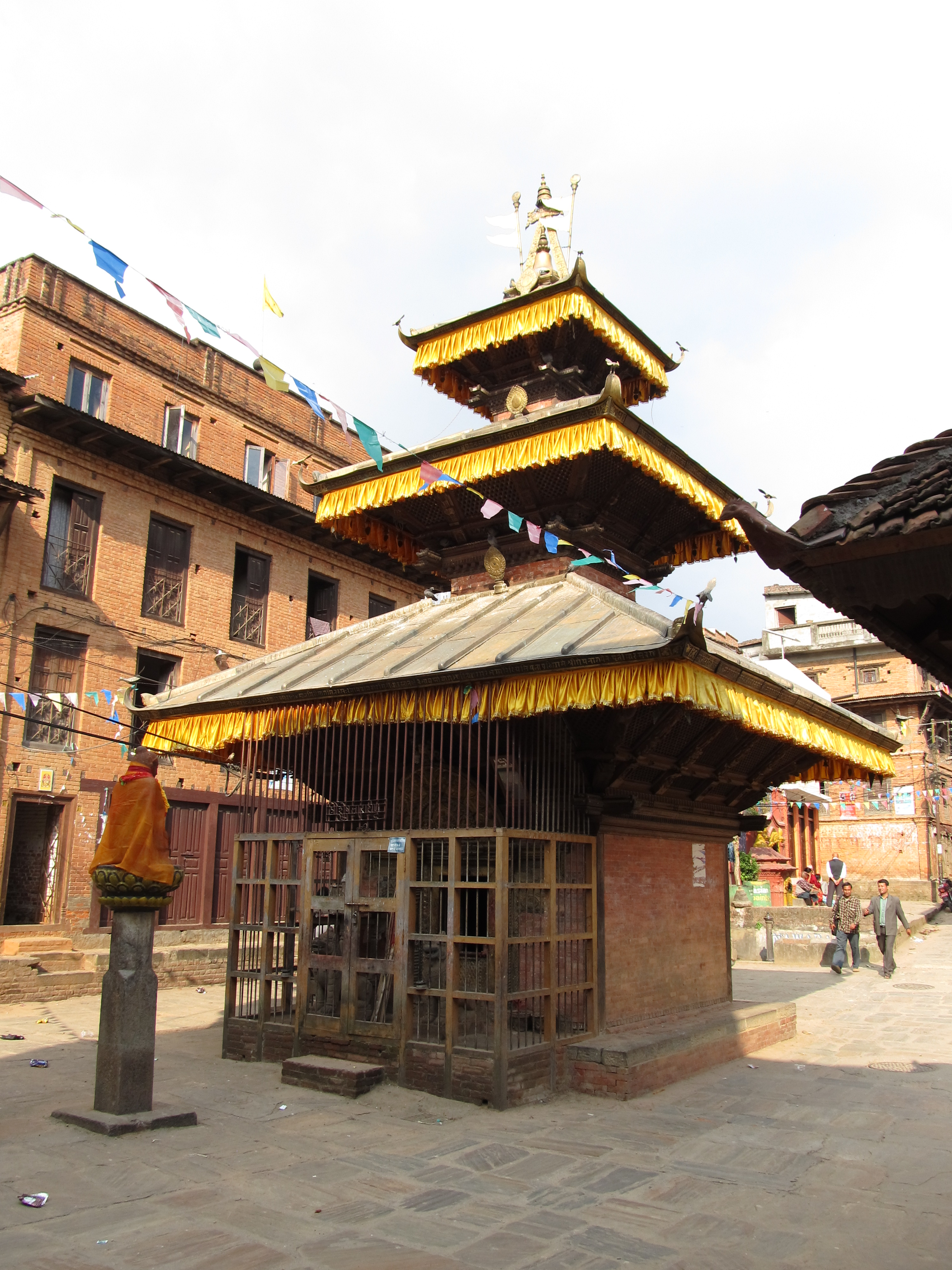
Dhulikhel

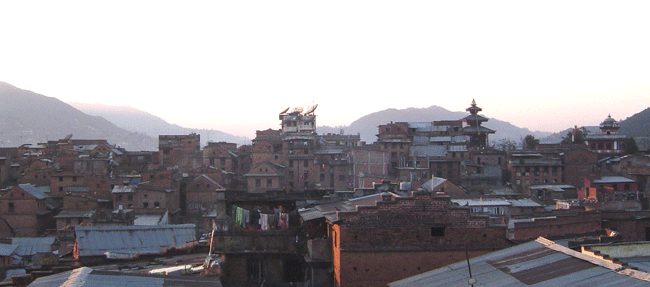

The oldest area of the town, the southern end, is an assembly of old Newari houses, often occupied by 20 or more members of the local extended families. Their most valuable assets are the beautifully carved windows and doors, fine examples of traditional Newari craftsmanship. The old town is made up of four toles called wotole(वटोल), etole (ईटोल), dutole (दुटोल), chochhe tole (चोच्छे टोल ).

The narrow streets, are typical of a medieval city inhabited for at least five centuries. The plan of the city is based on ancient Hindu planning doctrine with the position, shape, scale & dominance between buildings, temples, public squares all having their own meaning and harmony. There are organically developed compact settlements around Dhulikhel. One of such old settlements is Shreekhandpur, which lies 2 km west of the core city near the Kathmandu University, and is also a centuries-old Newari and Magar settlement. The settlement is protected by Swet Bhairav (an incarnation of Lord Shiva) and Narayan (Vishnu) deities. Gorkhanath temple also lies here.

=== Temples ===
There are numerous temples in the town depicting traditional and old Newari craftsmanship. These are places of worship for local people. The core area of Dhulikhel has interesting narrow cobbled streets and lanes embedded with number of Hindu Shrines and a few Buddhist Stupa.

In the centre of the old town is the Narayan Temple with its yellow metal roofs. It is dedicated to Lord Krishna whose birthday is celebrated in August. Alongside is the Harisiddhi Temple. Both the temples are adorned with profuse wood carvings and fronted by two Garudas. Bhagwati Temple is situated at the top of the western part of the town. The GaukhureshworMahadev Temple is on the east of the town near Tundikhel Recreation Park. Further up hill, is located the Bhagwati (Kali) Temple, which is a pagoda. Other monuments in dhulikhel are sarswoti temple, dakshinkali, huge statue of lord buddha, bhimsen, balkumari, lankhana mai, tepucha madya, bhairabh nath, bajrayogini, etc.

== Vicinity attractions ==
1. Panauti: It is another historical and culturally rich town located to the south east of Dhulikhel. You can reach Panauti by bus via Banepa or walk there along the trails of Namobuddha or walk along the DBP corridor. The town hosts one of the biggest festivals of Nepal, Makar Mela held every 12 years.
2. Namobuddha: A site where a prince sacrificed himself for a hungry and sick tigress, the story is etched in a stone. A visit to Namobuddha means more than just a visit; in addition to hiking for a day, along scenic route witnessing wide range of biodiversity, one can see the lifestyle of the locals.
3. Palanchowk Bhagwati: it lies in about half hour ride from Dhulikhel. Palanchowk Bhagwati has shrine of the goddess of the same name, who is 18 armed and is the goddess of protection from danger and misfortune. The temple dates back to 503 AD.
4. Chandeshwori Temple: located around 1 km northeast of Banepa, this temple commemorates mother goddess Chandeshwori for defeating demon Chanda. It is also a testament to the power of women, the goddess who defeated the demon and whom no man could kill thanks to the boon accorded him by Lord Shiva.
5. Nala: Being one of the seven villages established by Ari Malla about 700 years ago, Nala boasts of temples of Karunamai Lokeshwor and Bhagawati. Located 4 km north west of Banepa, the valley is fertile and produces a number of vegetables. It can be reached from Dhulikhel through Gosaikunda Hill, Opi village and Sumara.
6. Sanga Mahadev: Deriving from local language meaning village of cows, Sanga is gateway to Kavrepalanchowk district. It now has a massive statue (143 ft tall) of Lord Shiva.

=== Popular Figures ===
- Hari Bansha Acharya Actor
- Ram Bahadur Khatri Producer, Director and Actor
- Daya Ram Dahal Director
- Ravindra Khadka Actor
- Shweta Khadka Nepalese film actress, producer, politician and entrepreneur
- Mukunda Thapa Actor
- Shiva Prasad Humagain Politician
- Ganesh Lama Businessman and Politician

== Media ==
To promote local culture Dhulikhel has one FM radio station Radio Madhyapurba F.M. – 104 MHz Which is a Community radio Station.

== Gallery ==
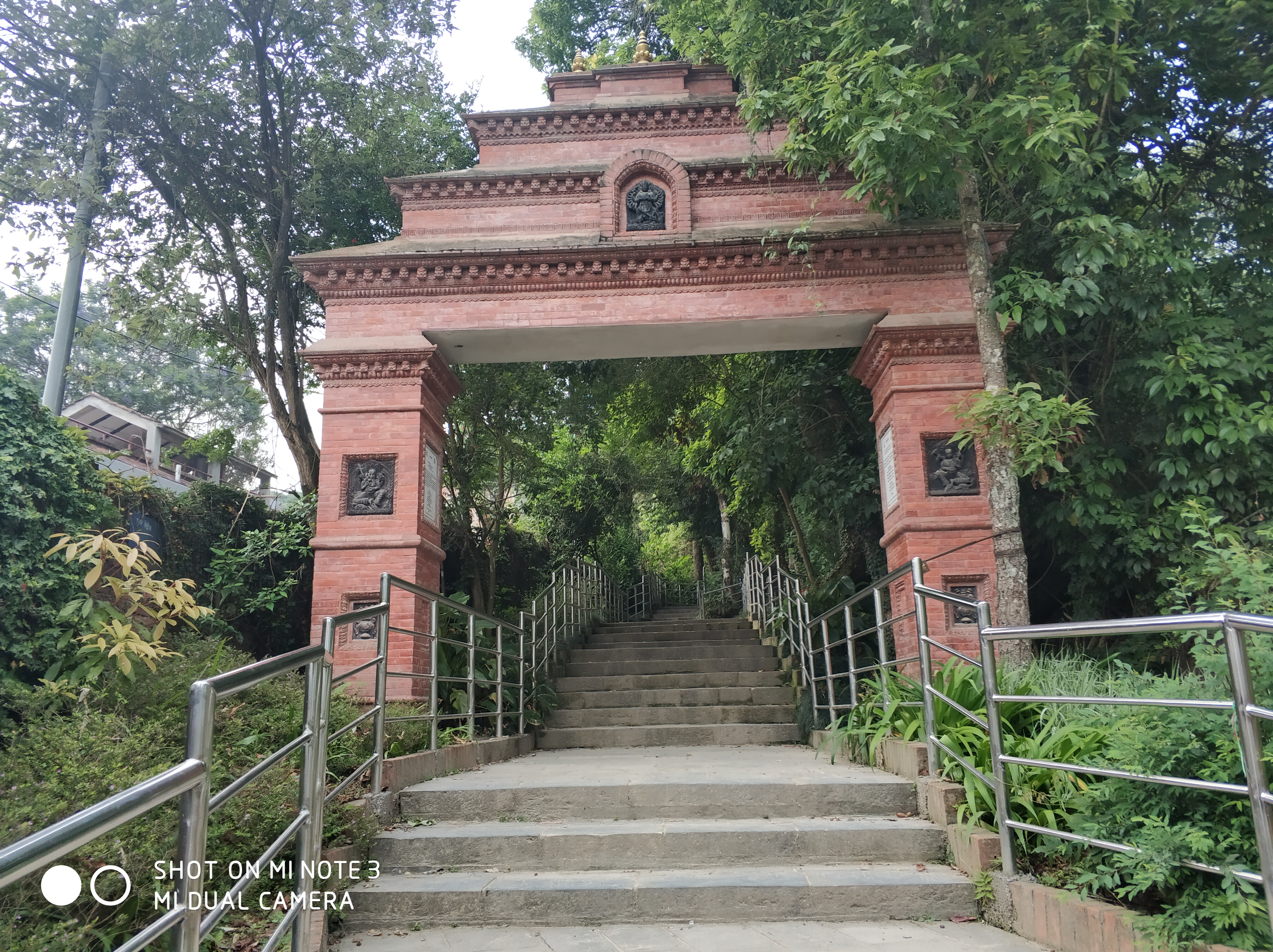
Devisthan Entry Door

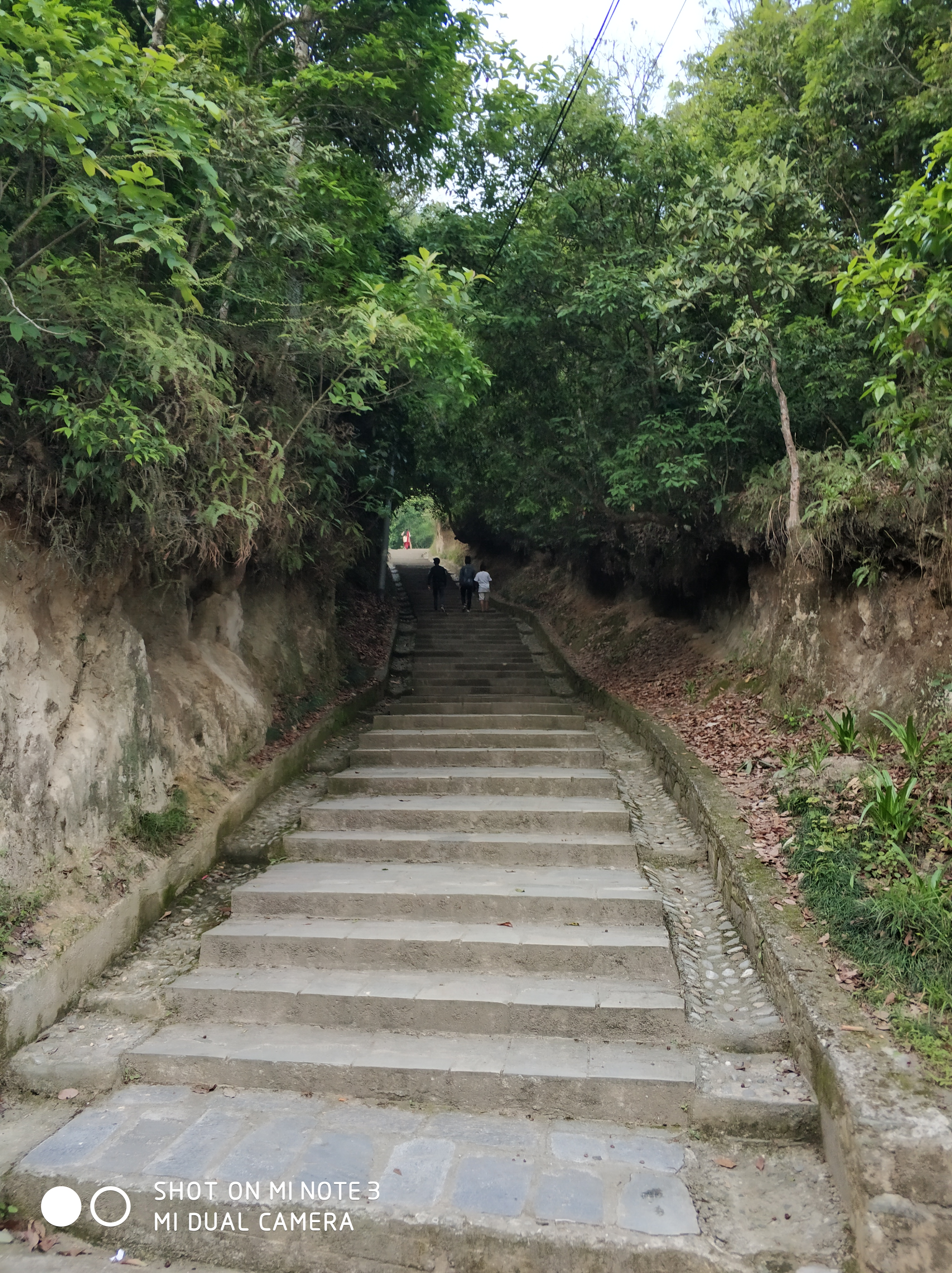
Devisthan

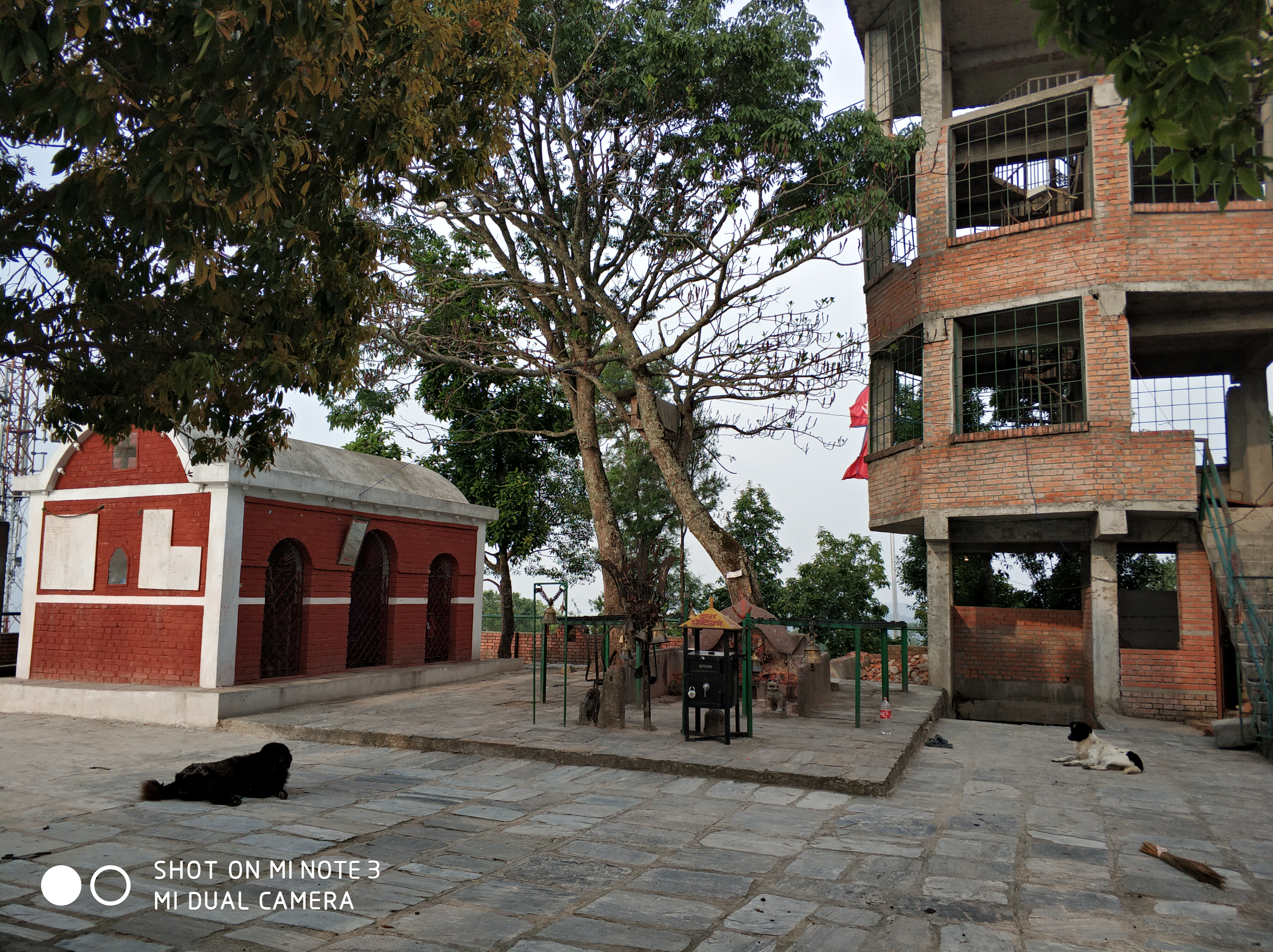
Devisthan

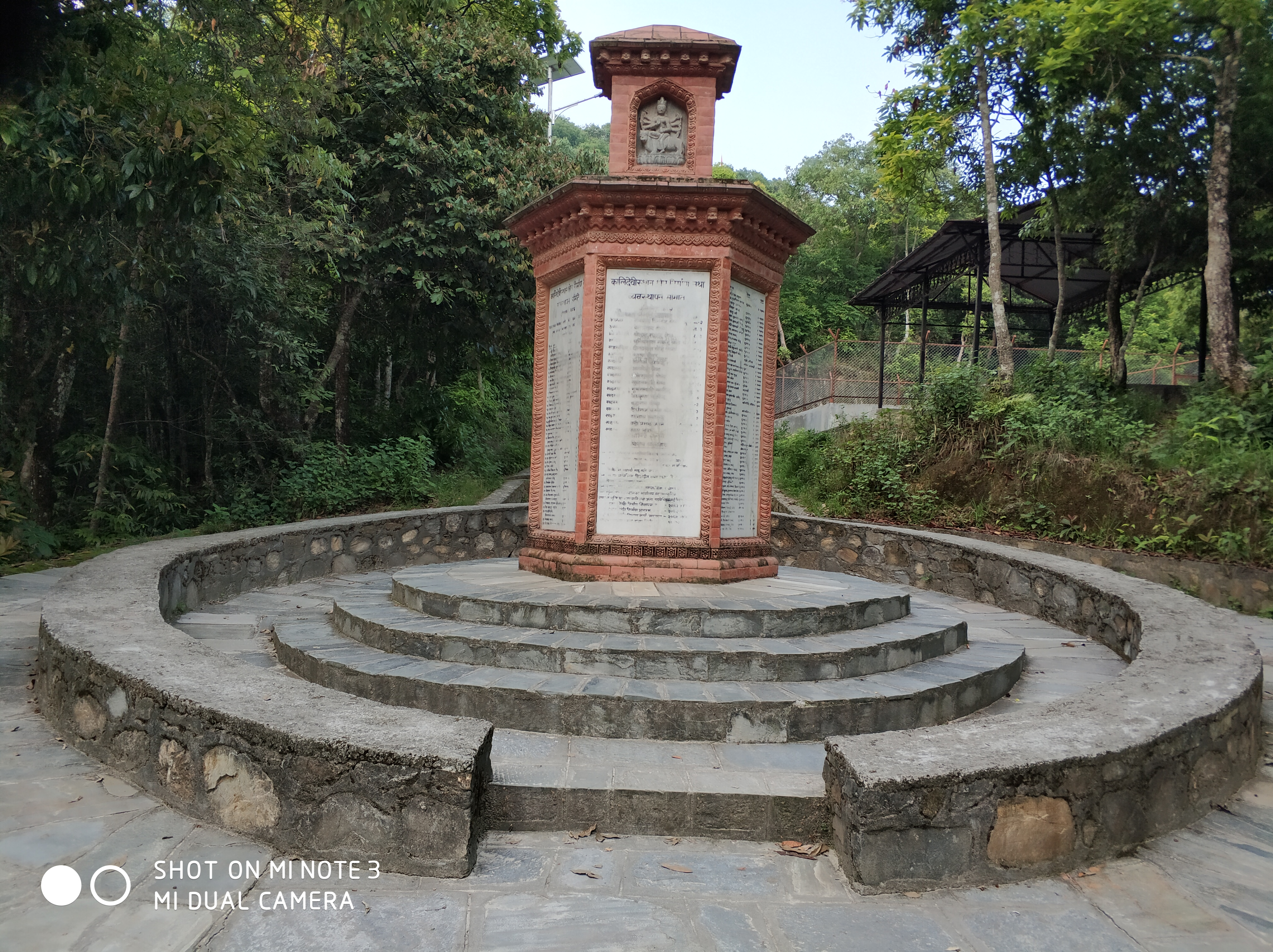
Devisthan

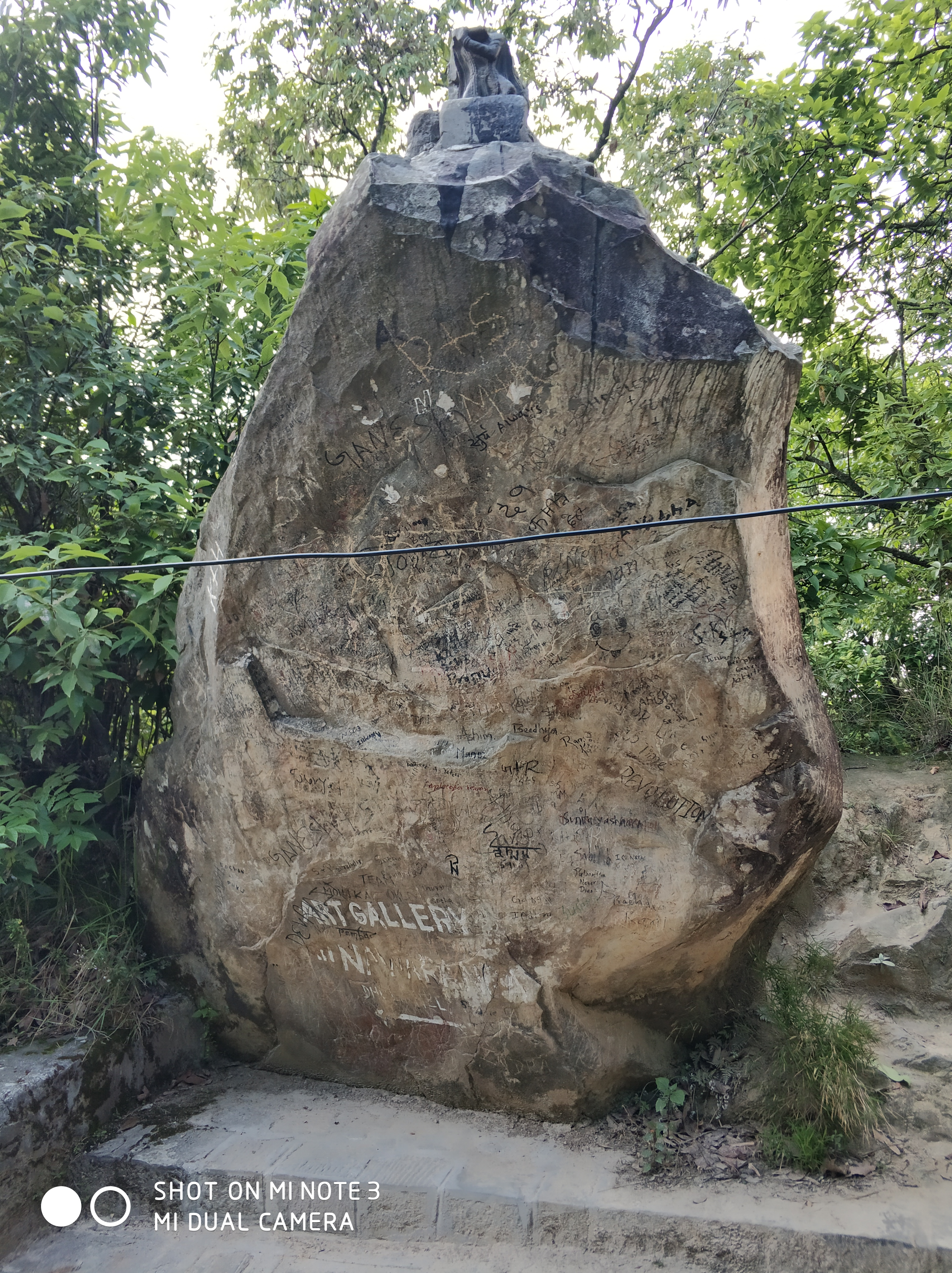
Stone at Devisthan hill

== See also ==
- Dhulikhel Hospital
- Kathmandu University
- Fortune Resort & Wellness Spa - Member ITC Hotels
