= Kathmandu University =

Public university in Dhulikhel, Nepal

- काठमाडौं विश्वविद्यालय
- Motto: Quality Education for Leadership
- Type: Public university
- Established: 1991 (35 years ago)
- Founders: Government of Nepal, Dr. Suresh Raj Sharma
- Endowment: Rs. 301 million (US$2M)
- Budget: Rs. (2025–26)
- Chancellor: Prime Minister of Nepal
- Vice-Chancellor: Dr. Bivek Baral
- Academic staff: 1,423 (~544 teaching staff 879 non-teaching)
- Students: 21,000+
- Location: Dhulikhel, Bagmati, Nepal; 27.6196°N 85.5386°E
- Campus: 44.18 acres (17.88 ha); Midsize city
- Website: ku.edu.np

Kathmandu University (KU) (Nepali: काठमाण्डौ विश्वविद्यालय) is an autonomous university in Nepal. It is the third oldest university in Nepal, located in Dhulikhel of Kavrepalanchok District, about 30 km (19 mi) east of Kathmandu. It was established in 1991 with the motto "Quality Education for Leadership." KU operates through its seven schools, and campuses in Dhulikhel, Lalitpur and Panchkhal. The university offers undergraduate, graduate and postgraduate courses in a variety of fields.

== History ==
The precursor to the university, Kathmandu Valley Campus (a private campus under the affiliation of Tribhuvan University) was established in 1985, which provided courses in the Intermediate of Science (ISc) level. The proposal to establish the university was discussed in the Parliament later, and it was approved through an Act on 11 December 1991.

=== Foundation ===
Kathmandu University High School

When established in November 1991 as a non-profit, autonomous, public university by an act KU became the first privately managed public institution of higher learning in Nepal. The predecessor of the university was the Kathmandu Valley Campus founded in 1985. The campus started as a private campus affiliated to Tribhuvan University and offered courses in science at the intermediate level (I. SC).

Kathmandu University started its academic program in 1992 with an Intermediate in Science program. In 1994, the university launched Bachelor programs in Pharmacy, Biology, and Engineering (electrical and electronics, computer, and mechanical). Later, Environmental Engineering and Sciences were included in its academic program. School of management launched its undergraduate program on Bachelor of Business Administration (BBA) in 1997 and Bachelor of Business Information Systems (BBIS) in 1999 respectively. M.Phil. and Ph.D. programs were started in 1997. The university also started a Law program, under the School of Law in December 2013.

=== Milestones ===
- August 1985 Establishment of Kathmandu University Valley Campus with academic affiliation to Tribhuvan University. Commencement of Intermediate of Science courses.
- November 1991 Kathmandu University chartered by an act of parliament.
- December 1991 First Senate meeting presided by the prime minister and chancellor of Kathmandu University, Girija Prasad Koirala. Appointment of Dr. Suresh Raj Sharma as the vice-chancellor of the university.
- January 1992 Appointment of Dr. Sitaram Adhikary as the registrar of the university.
- July 1992 School of Science opened in Tangal. Appointment of Dr. Bhadra Man Tuladhar as the dean of the School of Science. Commencement of Kathmandu University's own Intermediate of Science courses.
- August 1993 School of Management opened in New Baneswor. Appointment of Professor Krishna Swaminathan as the dean of the School of Management. Commencement of Masters of Business Administration program.
- March 1994 Academic Council decided to introduce three-year degree programs for B.A./B.Sc. pass, and four-year degree programs for B.A., B.E.

== Organization and administration ==
Kathmandu University provides education through seven schools:

- School of Arts (KUSOA)
- School of Education (KUSOED)
- School of Engineering (KUSOE)
- School of Law (KUSOL)
- School of Management (KUSOM)
- School of Medical Sciences (KUSMS)
- School of Science (KUSOS)
- Kathmandu University High School (KUHS)

KU has proposed two new schools in Panchkhal Municipality under which Agriculture program and Artificial Program has been started temporarily in Panchkhal whereas KU-KUNJ to be made very soon.

- School of Agriculture
- School of Forestry

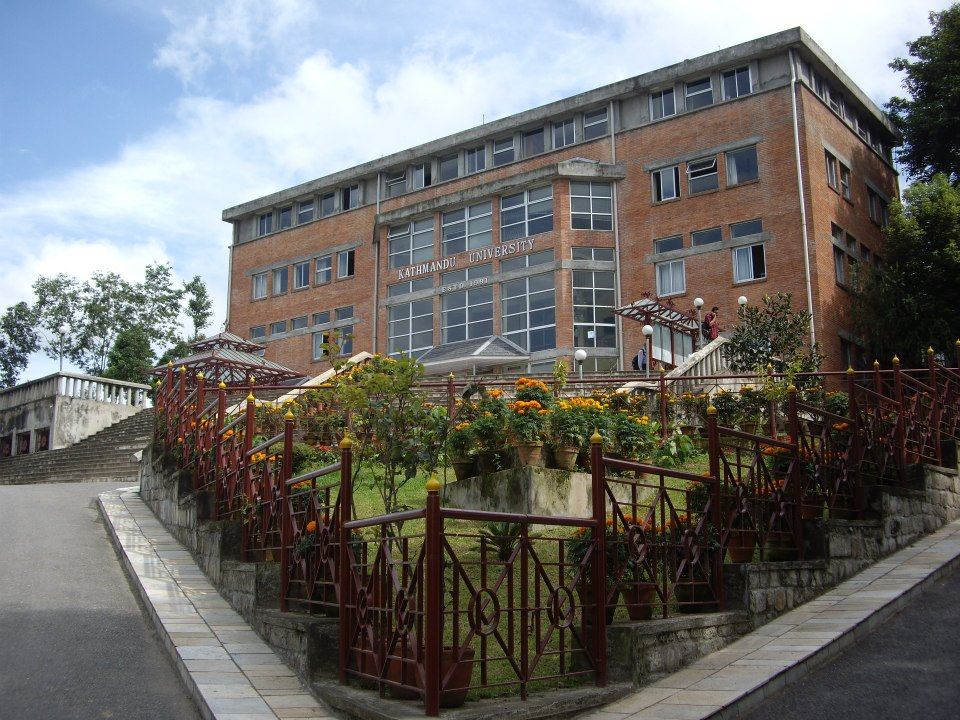
Administrative block of Kathmandu University

The School of Medical Sciences (KUSMS) and the School of Engineering (KUSOE) have highest number of students. The School of Medical Science was formerly known as KUMS, but in 2006 its name was changed to KUSMS, with the view that the school not only trains medical graduates and postgraduates but also runs paramedical disciplines. The School of Science, School of Engineering and one department of School of Management (Department of Management Informatics and Communication DoMIC) are present in the university premises, unlike other schools that have affiliated colleges around the nation. School of Engineering currently runs undergraduate and graduate-level courses mostly in Electrical and Electronics, Mechanical, Computer, Civil and Geomatics Engineering. It has also recently launched Chemical Engineering and Bachelor of Architecture. School of Management runs undergraduate and graduate level courses like Bachelor of Business Administration, Bachelor of Business Information Systems, Master of Business Administration, Executive MBA, MPPM and many more.

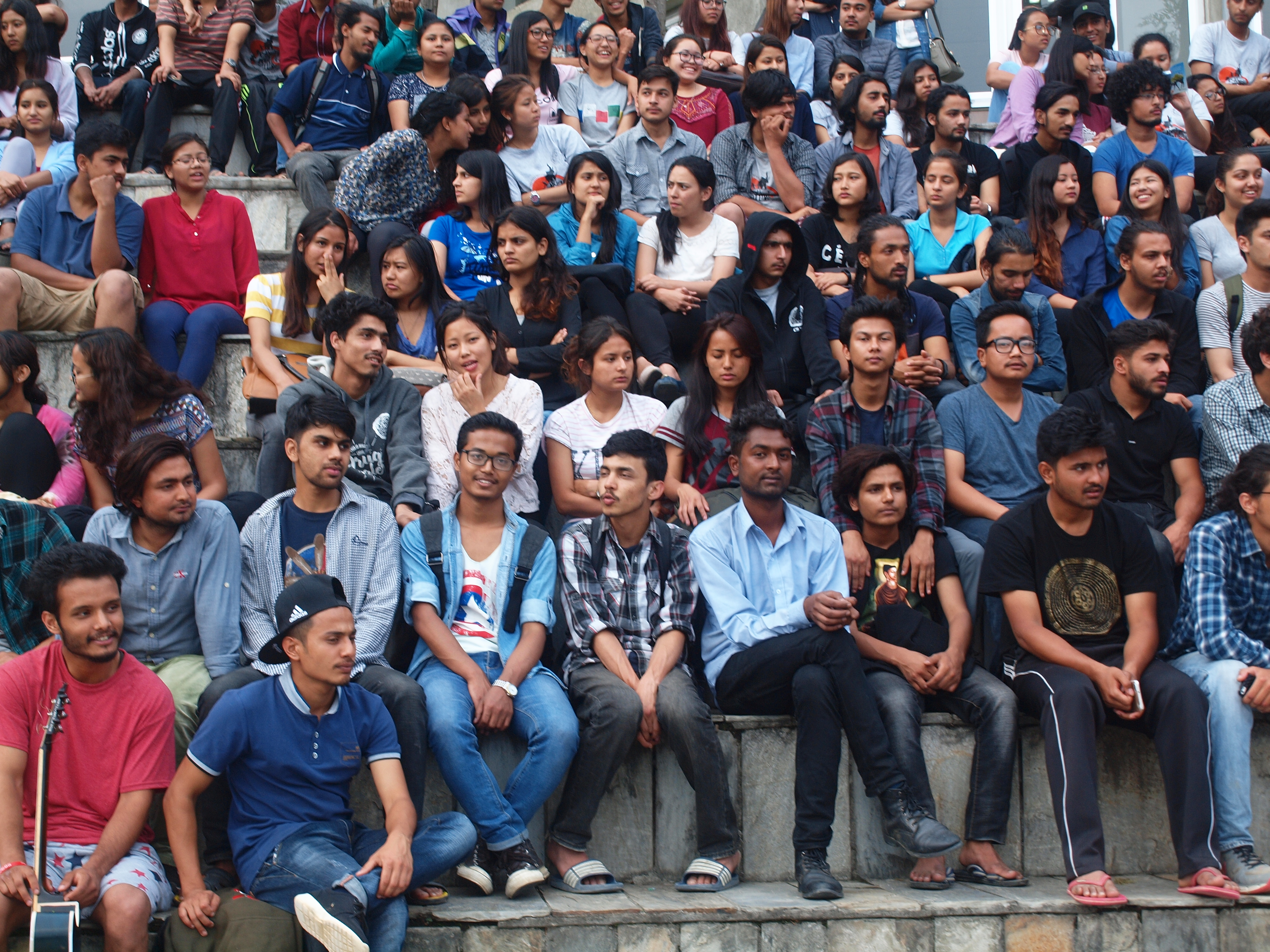
Student Gathering for Acoustic Evening on the Occasion of World Environment Day 2017 in Kathmandu University

The School of Science is currently conducting classes in B.Sc. Human Biology, Environmental Science and Engineering, Bio-Technology, and Applied Physics. Chemical Engineering, BSc nursing In Midwifery, and Bachelors in Physiotherapy is the recent addition to the list of the subject being offered by KU to students in Nepal for the first time.

== Academics ==
=== Undergraduate program ===
The university provides undergraduate to postgraduate programs in the fields of engineering, science, management, arts, education, law, and medical sciences. It provides undergraduate courses in engineering (Chemical, Civil, Computer, Electrical & Electronics, Mechanical, Environmental, Geomatics, Architecture, Mining), Science (Biotechnology, Computer Science, Data Science, Artificial Intelligence, Environmental science, Pharmacy, Human biology, Computational Mathematics & Applied physics), Management (Bachelors in Business Administration, Bachelor of Business Information Systems, executive MBA, Masters in Business Administration ...), Arts (music, media, community development, fine art, and economics), medical science (MBBS, MD/MS, MCH/DM in various medical specialties and sub-specialties, BSC Nursing, PCL Nursing, Bachelor in Nursing, BSC Midwifery, Bachelor in Physiotherapy BDS).

=== Affiliations ===
The university, in partnership with Rangjung Yeshe Institute, runs the Centre for Buddhist Studies. The centre offers undergraduate and graduate programs leading to Bachelor of Arts and Master of Arts degrees in Buddhist Studies and Himalayan languages. It provides research facilities for visiting international scholars of Buddhism for their graduate or postgraduate projects. In the summer, it hosts study-abroad programs and conducts intensive language immersion programs in Tibetan, Nepali, and Sanskrit.

The university owns Kathmandu University High School.

The first convocation of the university was held on 7 August 1995 and the convocation address was given by management guru, Dr. M.B. Atreya of India. The second convocation was held on 8 December 1996 and the convocation address was delivered by Professor N. Gyanam, vice chancellor, Pondicherry University and the president of Association of Indian Universities. The third convocation was held on 9 November 1997 and the convocation address was delivered by Professor (Dr.) M. Rammohan Rao, director, Indian Institute of Management, Bangalore, India. The fourth convocation, held on 17 September 1998, was addressed by the prominent scholar and ex-vice chancellor of Norwegian Institute of Technology, Norway. For the first time in Nepal, Kathmandu University convocated a batch of environmental, business information systems, mechanical, electrical, electronics and computer science and engineering graduates.

=== Student activities ===
Students Clubs

- Kathmandu University Hult Prize Club
- Students for the Exploration and Development of Space-Kathmandu University (SEDS-KU)
- Kathmandu University Literature Academy (KULA)
- Green Club of Thoughts
- AIESEC Kathmandu University
- Youth For Change- Kathmandu University
- Amnesty International Nepal Kathmandu University Youth Network (AIKUYN)
- Kathmandu University Robotics Club (KURC)
- Kathmandu University Youth Red Cross Circle (KUYRCC)
- KU Society of Music and Culture (KUSMC)
- Rotaract Club of Kathmandu University (RTC-KU)
- Kathmandu University Model United Nations club (KUMUNc)

School of Management - Departmental Clubs :

- KUSOM Finance Club
- KUSOM Sport Club
- KUSOM Creative Club
- KUSOM Events Club
- KUSOM Information System Club
- KUSOM Debate Club
- KUSOM Publication Club
- Society of Business Information Students (SBIS)

School of Engineering & School of Science - Departmental Clubs :

- Association of Mechanical Engineering Students (AMES)
- Nature and Social Concern Society (NSCS)
- Forum for Environmental Conservation and Management (FECAM)
- Forum For Pharmacy (FoP)
- Geomatics Engineering Society (GES)
- Kathmandu University Biotechnology Creatives (KUBiC)
- Kathmandu University Circle of Noble Chemineers (KUCONC)
- Kathmandu University Computational Mathematics Club (KUCMC)
- Kathmandu University Computer Club (KUCC)
- Kathmandu University Computer Club (KUCC)
- Kathmandu University Civil Engineering Club (KUCEC)
- Kathmandu University Architecture Club (KUARC), Previously known as KUARSA
- Natural and Social Concern Society (NSCS)
- Society for Electrical and Electronic Engineers (SEEE)

== Notable events ==
=== TEDx ===
Kathmandu University became the first university to host the university-level TEDx event in Nepal. The first iteration of this event/conference was conducted on 23 December 2019, under the tagline ‘Connecting Dots,’ in the central campus premises at Dhulikhel, Kavrepalanchok. TEDxKathmanduUniversity is an independently organized, completely non-profit TED event, which is operated under license from TED. TEDxKathmanduUniversity 2019 encompassed a handful of ideas to be delivered to the curious souls. The event aimed to impart the ideas circling around the following purviews: research ideas and methodologies; perks of being multidisciplinary; the importance of technology, computation and networking; and individual agency.

=== Silver Jubilee ===
Kathmandu University held a Ceremony at the main campus to mark the beginning of its year-long Silver Jubilee celebration.

The University plans to celebrate the year 2016 as its Silver Jubilee Year. A Silver Jubilee Celebration Organizing Committee has been formed under the chairmanship of the Chancellor, Rt. Hon'ble Prime Minister KP Sharma Oli. Different sub-committees have also been formed as per the nature of work.

Some of the programs envisioned include establishing Silver Jubilee Logo, inaugurating newly constructed buildings and constructing new ones, establishing Silver Jubilee Tower, felicitating well-known national and international scholars, organizing presentation programs with scholars from different fields, organizing KU Oration, exhibiting academic works of KU Family, publishing Silver Jubilee Souvenir and books, and organizing various sports and cultural programs.

Rt. Hon'ble President Bidya Devi Bhandari, who graced the ceremony as the chief guest, marked the inauguration of Silver Jubilee by unveiling the Silver Jubilee Logo and inaugurated the newly constructed buildings. Rt. Hon'ble Prime Minister KP Sharma Oli, the chancellor of the university, chaired the ceremony and laid the foundation stone of the Silver Jubilee Tower.

The inaugural ceremony included enlightening speeches of Hon'ble Minister for Education Giriraj Mani Pokhrel, Prof. Suresh Raj Sharma, the founding vice chancellor of KU, Mr. Daman Nath Dhungana, chairman of the board of trustees, and Prof. Dr. Ram Kantha Makaju Shrestha, vice chancellor.

Several cultural presentations were held on the occasion along with plantation of plants of variety of species. Renowned personalities, heads of district offices along with local residents and KU Family showed their gracious presence and participation in the ceremony.

== Notable alumni ==
- Nirvana Chaudhary - Managing director of the Chaudhary Group
- Sasmit Pokharel - Minister of Education and Sports
- Toshima Karki - Member of the House of Representatives of Nepal
- Prashant Upreti, Member of Parliament, Rastriya Swatantra Party
- Samikchya Baskota, Member of Parliament, Rastriya Swatantra Party
- Neelesh Man Singh Pradhan - C.E.O Nepal Clearing House Limited (NCHL)

== See also ==
- Tribhuwan University
- Purbanchal University
- Pokhara University

== Sources ==
- "Kathmandu University Act, 2048 (1991)". Ministry of Education, Government of Nepal.
