= List of hospitals in Nepal =

Nepal has mixed healthcare system with both public sector hospitals and private sector hospitals. Medical colleges have their own teaching hospitals which provide healthcare at subsidized costs. There are altogether 19 medical colleges in Nepal.

In public sector there are primary health centers, district hospital, provincial hospital and tertiary hospitals. In private sector there are general hospitals as well as super-speciality hospitals.

== Government Central Hospital ==
According to the National Health Policy of 1991, hospitals equipped with advanced facilities and offering specialty and super-specialty services are to be operated at the central level. The details of these central hospitals are as follows:

Hospital	City	Province	Description
Bir Hospital	Ratnapark	Bagmati	Oldest hospital of Nepal. Established by Bir Shumsher Jang Bahadur Rana in 1947 BS (1899 AD).
Patan Hospital	Lagankhel	Bagmati	
Nardevi Ayurvedic Hospital	Naradevi	Bagmati	
Pashupati Homeopathic Hospital	Hariharbhawan	Bagmati	
Unani Aushodhalaya	Hariharbhawan	Bagmati	
Civil Hospital	Baneshwor	Bagmati	An autonomous government institution under the Ministry of General Administration (MoGA), Nepal
Shree Birendra Hospital	Chhauni	Bagmati	Military Hospital
Tri Chandra military Hospital	Bhadrakali	Bagmati	Military Hospital
Nepal Police Hospital	Maharajgunj	Bagmati	Nepal Police Hospital, previously known as the Birendra Police Hospital, is the first hospital of Nepal Police organization
Nepal APF Hospital	Chandragiri	Bagmati	Operated by APF

== Government Diseases Specific Hospital ==
Hospital	City	Province	Description
Patan Mental Hospital	Lalitpur	Bagmati	
Kanti Children's Hospital	Maharajgunj	Bagmati	
National Cardiac Center	Basundhara, Kathmandu	Bagmati	Established to prevent, detect and treat risk factors of heart disease in Nepal.
Nepal Eye Hospital	Tripureshwor	Bagmati	
Teku Infectious Disease Hospital	Teku	Bagmati	
Paropakar Maternity Hospital	Thapathali	Bagmati	
Ganga Lal Hospital	Bansbari, Kathmandu	Bagmati	Specializes in cardiac care.
Bhaktapur Cancer Hospital	Bhaktapur	Bagmati	
Til Ganga Eye Hospital	Kathmandu	Bagmati	
Manmohan Cardiothoracic and vascular Hospital	Maharajgunj	Bagmati	
Bharatapur Cancer Hospital	Bharatpur	Bagmati	National cancer center for diagnosis, treatment, prevention and research
Sushil Koirala Prakhar Cancer Hospital	Khajura	Lumbini	
Human Organ Transplant Centre	Dudhpati-17, Bhaktapur	Bagmati	A 100 bedded government Tertiary Organ Transplant hospital
National Tuberculosis Control Center	Thimi, Bhaktapur	Bagmati	
G.P. Koirala National Center For Respiratory Diseases	Shuklagandaki	Gandaki	first specialized respiratory disease in Nepal
Mechi Eye Hospital	Birtamod	Koshi	
Golchha Eye Hospital	Biratnagar	Koshi	
Sagarmatha Choudhary Eye Hospital	Lahan, Siraha	Madhesh	Established in 1983 AD at Lahan, eastern part of Nepal by Dr Albrecht Hennig from Germany, Nepal Netra Jyoti Sangh (NNJS) and local Choudhary Family.
Kedia Eye Hospital	Lipani, Birgunj	Madhesh	
Himalayan Eye Hospital	Pokhara	Gandaki	
Rapti Eye Hospital	Tulsipur, Dang	Lumbini	50 bedded government hospital, established in 1986 with the support of NCA, Norway and inaugurated by the then king of Nepal, Birendra Bir Bikram Shah Dev.
Fatte Eye Hospital	Nepalgunj	Lumbini	
Geta Eye Hospital	Attariya	Sudurpashchim	

== Government Teaching Hospital ==
Hospital	City	Province	Description
TU Teaching Hospital	Maharajganj, Kathmandu	Bagmati	
National Academy of Medical Sciences	Kathmandu	Bagmati	
Patan Academy of Health Sciences	Patan	Bagmati	
Karnali Academy of Health Sciences	Jumla	Karnali	Started Doctor of Medicine aka MD course in 2021 AD.
B.P. Koirala Institute of Health Sciences	Dharan	Koshi	
Madan Bhandari Academy of Health Sciences	Hetauda	Bagmati	
Rapti Academy of Health Sciences	Ghorahi	Lumbini	
Nepal Army Institute of Health Science	Bhandarkhal	Bagmati	Medical Institution run by Nepal Army
Pokhara Academy of Health Sciences	Pokhara	Gandaki	
Madhesh Institute of Health Sciences	Janakpur	Madhesh	

=== Ayurveda Teaching Hospital ===
Hospital	City	Province	Description
Ayurveda Teaching Hospital	Kirtipur	Bagmati	

== Government Provincial Hospital ==
The National Health Policy of 1991 established one Zonal Hospital in each of the country's zones. These hospitals provide specialized services in pediatrics, gynecology, general surgery, general medicine, eye, ear, nose, and throat care, as well as dental services.

Hospital	City	Province	Description
Mechi Provincial Hospital	Bhadrapur Municipality-08	Koshi	
Koshi Provincial Hospital	Biratnagar-10, Morang	Koshi	It is regarded as one of the oldest hospitals of Nepal.
Sagarmatha Provincial Hospital	Rajbiraj	Madhesh	
Gaur Provincial Hospital	Gaur	Madhesh	
Jaleshwor Hospital	Jaleshwor, Mohattari	Madhesh	
Janakpur Provincial Hospital	Janakpur	Madhesh	
Kalaiya Provincial Hospital	Kalaiya	Madhesh	
Malangwa Provincial Hospital	Malangwa	Madhesh	
Narayani Provincial Hospital	Birgunj	Madhesh	
Siraha Provincial Hospital	Lahan	Madhesh	
Hetauda Provincial Hospital	Hetauda	Bagmati	A 170 bedded
Pokhara Provincial Hospital	Pokhara	Gandaki	
Dhaulagiri Provincial Hospital	Baglung	Gandaki	
Madhyabindu Provincial Hospital	Nawalpur	Gandaki	
Lumbini Provincial Hospital	Butwal	Lumbini	
Rapti Provincial Hospital	Tulsipur, Dang	Lumbini	Established as a Health post in 2033 BS (1976–1977).
Bheri Provincial Hospital	Nepalgunj	Lumbini	Established in 1947 BS (1890–1891)
Karnali Provincial Hospital	Kalagaun, Surkhet	Karnali	
Seti Provincial Hospital	Dhangadi, Kailali,	Sudurpashchim	
Mahakali Provincial Hospital	Mahendranagar, Kanchanpur	Sudurpashchim	

=== Ayurvedic Hospital ===
Hospital	City	Province	Description
Dang Regional Ayurvedic Hospital	Dang	Lumbini	

== Government District Hospital ==
According to the National Health Policy of 1991, at least one hospital was established in each district of the country. These hospitals provide outpatient and inpatient services, family planning, maternity and child health services, immunization services, and emergency services. The district hospitals are broadly categorized into four groups—"Ka," "Kha," and "Ga," —based on their geographical location and the availability of services.

Categorization	No. of beds
A( Ka)	15
B( Kha)	15-49
C(Ga)	50+

Categorization	Name of Hospital	City	Province
A( Ka) Listed District Hospital	Rasuwa District Hospital	Gosaikunda, Dhunche	Bagmati
A( Ka) Listed District Hospital	Manang District Hospital	Chame	Gandaki
A( Ka) Listed District Hospital	Mustang District Hospital	Mustang	Gandaki
A( Ka) Listed District Hospital	Bajura District Hospital	Badimalika	Sudurpashchim
A( Ka) Listed District Hospital	Mugu District Hospital	Gamgadhi	Karnali
A( Ka) Listed District Hospital	Dolpa District Hospital	Dunai	karnali
A( Ka) Listed District Hospital	Humla District Hospital	Simikot	Karnali
A( Ka) Listed District Hospital	Solu District Hospital	Phaplu, Solukhumbu	Koshi
B( Kha) category District Hospital	Taplegunj District Hospital	Phungling	Koshi
B( Kha) category District Hospital	Tehrathum District Hospital	Myanglung	Koshi
B( Kha) category District Hospital	Jiri Hospital, Dolakha	Jiri	Bagmati
B( Kha) category District Hospital	Lamjung District Hospital	Besishahar	Gandaki
B( Kha) category District Hospital	Damauli Hospital, Tanahun	Damauli	Gandaki
B( Kha) category District Hospital	Parbat Hospital	Kushma	Gandaki
B( Kha) category District Hospital	Beni Hospital, Myagdi	Beni	Gandaki
B( Kha) category District Hospital	Kapilvastu Hospital	Kapilvastu	Lumbini
B( Kha) category District Hospital	Rukum District Hospital	Sanibheri	Karnali
B( Kha) category District Hospital	Jajarkot Hospital	Jajarkot	Karnali
B( Kha) category District Hospital	Dailekh District Hospital	Dailekh	Karnali
B( Kha) category District Hospital	Accham District Hospital	Mangalsen	Sudurpashchim
B( Kha) category District Hospital	Salyan District Hospital	Khalanga, Salyan	Karnali
B( Kha) category District Hospital	Baitadi District Hospital	Baitadi	Sudurpashchim
B( Kha) category District Hospital	Darchula Hospital	Darchula	Sudurpashchim
B( Kha) category District Hospital	Ramechhap Hospital	Ramechhap	Bagmati
C(Ga) category District Hospital	Panchthar District Hospital	Phidim	Koshi
C(Ga) category District Hospital	Ilam Hospital	Ilam	Koshi
C(Ga) category District Hospital	Dhankuta District Hospital	Dhankuta	Koshi
C(Ga) category District Hospital	Bhojpur District Hospital	Bhojpur	Koshi
C(Ga) category District Hospital	Sankhuwasabha District Hospital	Khandbari	Koshi
C(Ga) category District Hospital	Khotang District Hospital	Diktel	Koshi
C(Ga) category District Hospital	Morang	Rangeli	Koshi
C(Ga) category District Hospital	Sunsari District Hospital	Inaruwa	Koshi
C(Ga) category District Hospital	Udayapur District Hospital	Triyuga, Udayapur	Koshi
C(Ga) category District Hospital	Sindhuli Hospital	Sindhulimadhi	Bagmati
C(Ga) category District Hospital	Chautara Hospital, Sindhupalchowk	Chautara	Bagmati
C(Ga) category District Hospital	Trishuli Hospital, Nuwkot	Bidur	Bagmati
C(Ga) category District Hospital	Dhading Hospital	Dhading Besi	Bagmati
C(Ga) category District Hospital	Gorkha Hospital	Gorkha	Gandaki
C(Ga) category District Hospital	Kapilvastu Hospital	Kapilvastu	Lumbini
C(Ga) category District Hospital	Palpa Hospital	Tansen	Gandaki
C(Ga) category District Hospital	Gulmi Hospital	Tamghas	Gandaki
C(Ga) category District Hospital	Arghakhachi Hospital	Sandhikharka	Lumbini
C(Ga) category District Hospital	Pyuthan Hospital	Bijubar	Lumbini
C(Ga) category District Hospital	Bardiya Hospital	Gulariya	Lumbini
C(Ga) category District Hospital	Doti District Hospital	Doti	Sudurpashchim
C(Ga) category District Hospital	Dadeldhura Hospital	Dadeldhura	Sudurpashchim

== Government Local Level Hospital ==
Hospital	City	Province
Chandranigapur Hospital	Chandranigapur, rautahat	Madhesh
Burtibang Hospital	Burtiwang, Baglung	Gandaki
Rampur Hospital	Rampur, Palpa	Gandaki Province
Banganga Hospital	Banganga, Kapilvastu	Lumbini
Mehalkuna Hospital	Mehalkuna, Surkhet	Karnali
Tikapur Hospital	Tikapur, Kailali	Sudurpashchim
Bakulahar Ratnanagar Hospital	Ratnagar, Chitwan	Bagmati
Bardibas Hospital	Bardibaas, Mohattarai	Madhesh
Katari Hospital	Katari, Udayapur	Koshi
Methinkot Hospital	Methinikot, Kavrepalanchowk	Bagmati
Maninkhel Hospital	Manikhel, Lalitpur	Bagmati
Mirchaiya Hospital	Mirchaiya, Siraha	Madhesh

== Major Private Hospitals ==
Hospital	City	Province	Description
Kathmandu Neurology Clinic & Cognitive Center (KNCCC)	117 Lal Durbar Marg, Kathmandu	Bagmati	An outpatient referral center specializing in neurology and cognitive sciences. The facility provides diagnostic and treatment protocols for ambulatory neurological disorders, including refractory primary and secondary headaches, chronic migraine, and memory disorders. It operates as part of the Clinics Tree Healthcare Network.
Anandaban Hospital	Tika Bhairab, Lele, Lalitpur	Bagmati	Hospital founded by The Leprosy Mission provides specialist tertiary leprosy care; also general care and outpatient orthopaedic and dermatology services.
B & B Hospital	Gwarko, Kathmandu	Bagmati	It is a teaching hospital of Kathmandu University School of Medical Sciences.
Biratnagar Eye Hospital	Biratnagar	Koshi	Established in 2006 at Biratnagar.
Chitwan Medical College	Bharatpur, Chitwan District	Bagmati	
CIWEC	Kathmandu	Bagmati	
Dhulikhel Hospital	Dhulikhel	Bagmati	
Grande Hospital	Dhapasi, Kathmandu	Bagmati	
Janaki Medical College	Janakpur	Madhesh	
Kathmandu Cancer Center Hospital	Tathali Nala Road, Bhaktapur	Bagmati	First private cancer hospital with modern radiotherapy facilities in Nepal. Specialize in cancer surgery and total body radiotherapy for bone marrow transplant.
Purbanchal Cancer Hospital	Birtamode, Jhapa	Koshi	
Kathmandu Medical College	Sinamangal	Bagmati	
Kirtipur Hospital	Kirtipur, Kathmandu	Bagmati	
Kist Medical College and Teaching Hospital	Imadol	Bagmati	
Kunde Hospital	Kunde, Solukhumbu	Koshi	
Manipal Teaching Hospital	Pokhara	Gandaki	
Gandaki Medical College	Pokhara	Gandaki	
National Institute of Neurological Applied Science	Bansbari, Kathmandu	Bagmati	
Nepal Medical Teaching Hospital	Jorpati, Kathmandu	Bagmati	
Nepal Mediciti Hospital	Nakhkhu Patan, Karyabinayak	Bagmati	
Nobel Medical College Teaching Hospital	Biratnagar	Koshi	
Norvic Hospital	Thapathali, Kathmandu	Bagmati	
Om Hospital & Research Centre	Chabahil, Kathmandu	Bagmati	Hospital with around 100 consultants of different specialists and 500 plus staff.
Siddhasthali Rural Community Hospital	Ramnagar, Hetauda	Bagmati	A non-profit hospital established in 2024 providing general medicine, dental, diagnostic, and emergency services to rural communities.
Siddhartha Children and Women Hospital	Butwal, Rupandehi	Lumbini	
Vayodha Hospital	Balkhu, Kathmandu	Bagmati	
HAMS Hospital	Dhumbarahi	Bagmati	
Himal Hospital	Naxal	Bagmati	
Inova Hospital	Lazimpat	Bagmati	
Thamel Clinic (Formerly Called STD Treatment Clinic)	Thamel	Bagmati	Thamel Clinic is Nepal's First Private Sexual Health Center. It has Recently Expanded To General Services also. It Has Most Advanced Inhouse Lab For STD & STI Diagnosis. The Major Difference Noted By Public is The Price Of The lab Test. The Test are Done in Minimal Price As Compared To Other Private Centers. It Provides Comprehensive Care By Infectious Diseases Specialist, Gynecologist, Dermatologist, Urologist and others Related. People Choosing Privacy and Easy Access To Sexual Diseases Diagnosis, Treatment & Prevention Choose This Place. Foreigners Find It Easy To Have Consultation Due To Their Pay & Claim Model Of Insurance.
Binaytara Foundation Cancer Center (BTFCC)	Janakpur	Madhesh	
Silent Care Solution - Women's Health Clinic	Dillibazar Pipalbot, Kathmandu	Bagmati	Low Cost Gynecology & Endocrinology Consultations. Dr. Rashmi Bastakoti and Dr. Sanjay Kumar Thakur Are Lead Doctors. Fully Designed For Female-Friendly Services With Privacy. All The Services Are Top Notch With The Lowest Cost For Patients.
B&C Medical College Teaching Hospital and Research Center	Birtamode, Jhapa	Koshi	It is one of the largest tertiary care hospitals in eastern Nepal. Located in Birtamode-05, Jhapa District.

== See also ==
- List of medical colleges in Nepal
