= B&C Medical College Teaching Hospital and Research Center =

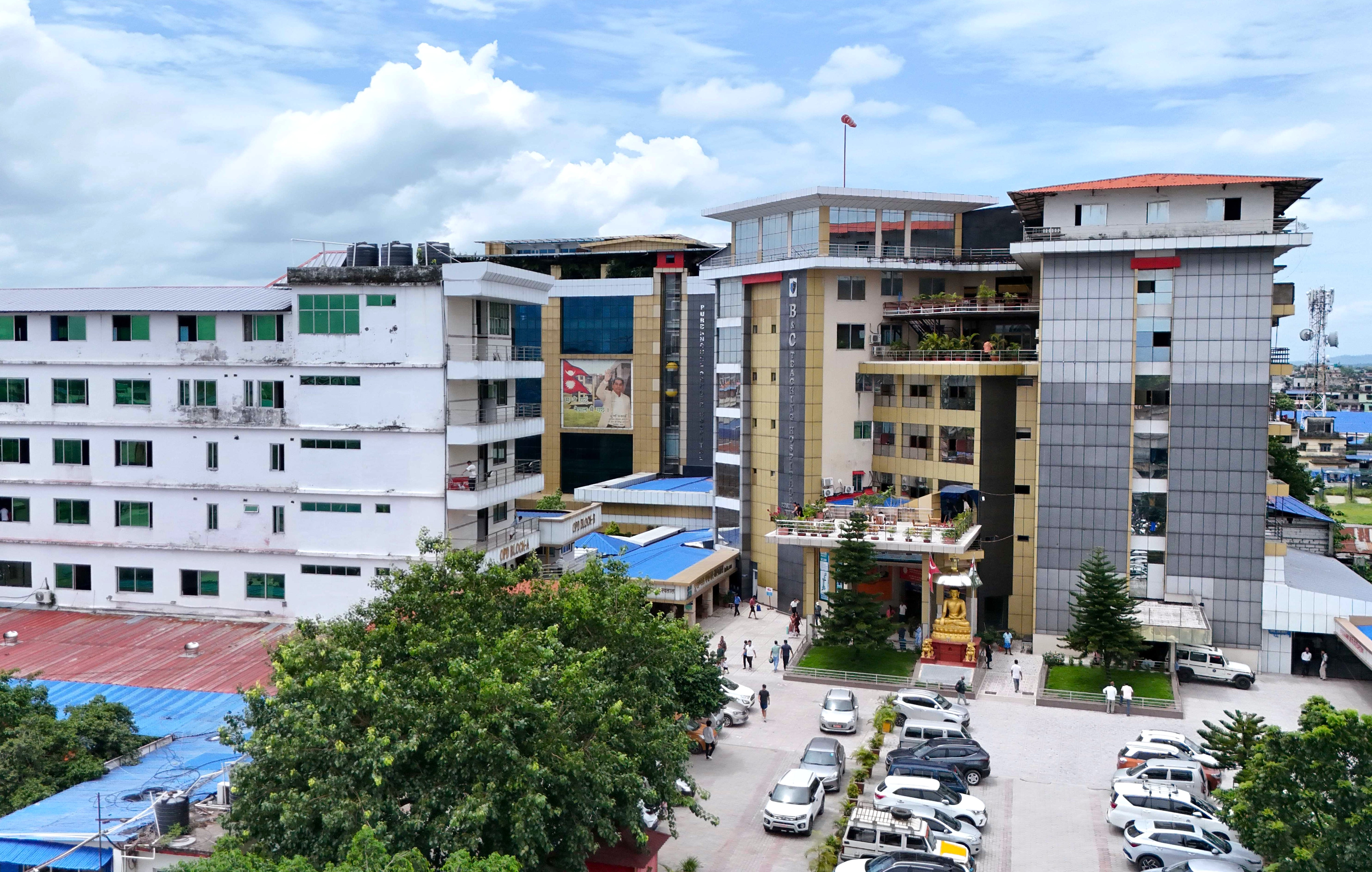
- B&C Medical College Building

Geography
- Location: Birtamode-05, Jhapa, Koshi Province, Nepal
- Coordinates: 26.6454°N 87.9980°E

Organisation
- Care system: Private
- Type: Teaching, Multi-specialty tertiary care
- Affiliated university: Kathmandu University

Services
- Emergency department: Yes
- Beds: 300+

Helipads
- Helipad: Yes

History
- Founded: 2015

Links
- Website: bncmedicalcollege.edu.np
- Lists: Hospitals in Nepal

B&C Medical College Teaching Hospital and Research Center (BNC Hospital) is one of the largest tertiary care hospitals in eastern Nepal. Located in Birtamode-05, Jhapa District, it functions as a comprehensive medical college, teaching hospital, and research institution.

== History ==
The college was founded by Shri Durga Prasai, a social worker and activist, in collaboration with Dr. Ram Babu Giri and Mrs. Indira Giri. Their vision was to establish a world-class medical institution in eastern Nepal that would deliver international-standard medical education, research, and patient care.

The hospital began its operations in 2015 (2071 BS), and the medical college was formally commenced in 2024 (2081 BS). Since its establishment, B&C Medical College Teaching Hospital has evolved into one of the most prominent healthcare and academic institutions in eastern Nepal, continuously expanding its infrastructure, clinical capacity, and academic scope.

== Facilities and services ==
B&C Medical College Teaching Hospital is a multispecialty, 300+ bedded tertiary care center. It provides comprehensive medical services to patients from eastern Nepal and adjoining regions of India.

=== Major medical and diagnostic facilities ===
1. Outpatient (OPD) and Inpatient (IPD) services
2. Emergency and Trauma Care Unit with 24-hour service
3. Intensive Care Units (ICUs) including Adult & Pediatric ICU, Coronary Care Unit (CCU), High Dependency Unit (HDU), and Neonatal Intensive Care & Special Care Nursery
4. Advanced Diagnostic and Imaging Services, including:
  - Pathology & Laboratory Medicine
  - Radiology and Imaging (X-ray CR & DR, USG, CT scan, MRI, Mammography, DEXA Scan)
  - Nuclear Medicine with PET CT Scan
  - Cardiac Catheterization Laboratory (Cath Lab) for cardiac diagnostics and interventional procedures
5. Dialysis Services for renal care
6. Mortuary Services

=== Specialized departments ===
Internal Medicine, Nephrology, Cardiology, Neurosurgery, Orthopedics, General Surgery, Anesthesiology, ENT, Oncology, Obstetrics & Gynecology, Pediatrics, Neuro-Psychiatry, Uro-Surgery, Oral & Maxillofacial Surgery & Dentistry, Dermatology & Aesthetic Center, Endocrinology & Metabolism, Infertility & IVF Services.

=== Supportive and allied services ===
- Physiotherapy & Rehabilitation
- Audiology
- Nutrition & Dietetics
- In-Patient Food Services
- Hospital Pharmacies

== Public health and government schemes ==
The hospital is recognized for its commitment to inclusive healthcare and actively participates in a wide range of governmental and welfare health programs. These include:

- Nepal Government Health Insurance Program
- Social Security Fund (SSF)
- Ex-Servicemen Contributory Health Scheme (ECHS)
- Bippanna Nagarik Awasadi Upachar Kosh (Indigent Citizen Treatment Fund)
- Head and Spinal Injury Program
- Free Hemodialysis Services
- Government Subsidy for Treatment of Eight Major Diseases (up to NPR 2 Lakhs)
- Employment Welfare Fund
- Sahara Nepal Health Scheme Benefits

These initiatives ensure that patients from all economic and social backgrounds have access to quality medical services at affordable costs.

== Infrastructure and support systems ==
B&C Medical College Teaching Hospital operates with complete self-sufficiency in critical infrastructure, including:

- Own Oxygen plant ensuring uninterrupted medical oxygen supply.
- Scientific waste management System adhering to environmental and safety standards.
- Licensed Blood Transfusion Center.
- Advanced Laboratory and Radiological Services.
- Emergency Rescue Services, including helicopter evacuation and ambulance network with advanced life support facilities.

== Academics ==
Under the affiliation of Kathmandu University, B&C Medical College offers the following academic programs:

- Bachelor of Medicine, Bachelor of Surgery (MBBS)
- Bachelor of Science in Nursing (B.Sc. Nursing)

The MBBS program, initiated in 2024, comprises four and a half years of academic study followed by a one-year internship. The college welcomes students from Nepal and abroad, providing hands-on clinical training within the teaching hospital across multiple disciplines.

B&C Medical College offers a four-year Bachelor of Science in Nursing (B.Sc. Nursing) program designed to prepare competent Bachelor of Science nurse graduate to function independently or in collaboration with multidisciplinary health team members in the care of individual, family, group and community regarding preventive, promotive, curative and rehabilitative aspects of health.

Both of the programs are listed in the World Directory of Medical Schools (WDOMS) and recognized by the National Medical Commission (India).

== Recognition and accreditation ==
B&C Medical College Teaching Hospital and Research Center is recognized and accredited by:

- Nepal Medical Council (NMC)
- Nepal Nursing Council (NNC)
- Nepal Health Professional Council (NHPC)
- Ministry of Education, Science and Technology, Nepal
- Ministry of Health and Population, Nepal
- Listed by the World Health Organization (WHO) and the National Medical Commission (India)
