= Gajendra Narayan Singh =

Gajendra Narayan Singh may refer to:

- Gajendra Narayan Singh (politician)
- Gajendra Narayan Singh (musicologist)
- Gajendra Narayan Singh Sagarmatha Zonal Hospital
