= Binaytara Foundation Cancer Center =

Hospital in Madhesh, Nepal

- Binayatara Foundation
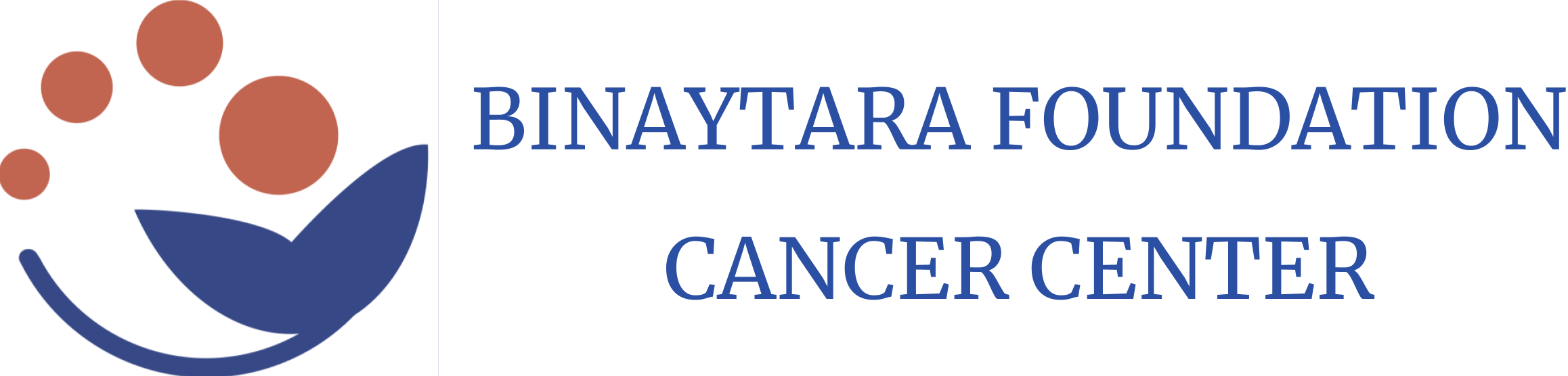

Geography
- Location: Janakpur Nepal, Janakpur, Madesh Provience, Nepal
- Coordinates: 26°45′16″N 85°56′27″E

Organisation
- Type: cancer Hospital

Services
- Emergency department: yes
- Beds: 25(currently), 200(underconstruction)

History
- Constructed: April 2022, (for expansion 200 bed )
- Opened: 2018

Links
- Website: cancer.binayfoundation.org
- Lists: Hospitals in Nepal

Binaytara Foundation Cancer Center (BTFCC) is a non-government & non profit hospital located in Janakpurdham Madhesh Province Nepal. The foundation provides services for cancer diseases. BTFCC is currently running a 25-bed cancer center at Janakpur, Nepal.

== History ==
It was established in 2018 by the US-based Binayatara Foundation, the Binaytara Foundation Cancer Center (BTFCC) is located in Madesh Provience Janakpur, Nepal. This is the first and sole cancer hospital in the densely populated Madesh Province, offering services from prevention to palliative care. Until that date, BTFCC provided services with 25 beds and is now expanding to 200 beds after receiving approval for the construction of a new hospital. The Janakpur Sub-Metropolitan City has approved the building plans for this 200-bed hospital.

== Departments ==
- Medical Oncology
- Surgical Oncology
- Radiological Services
- Laboratory Services
- Hospice and Palliative Care
- Preventive oncology
