= Purbanchal Cancer Hospital =

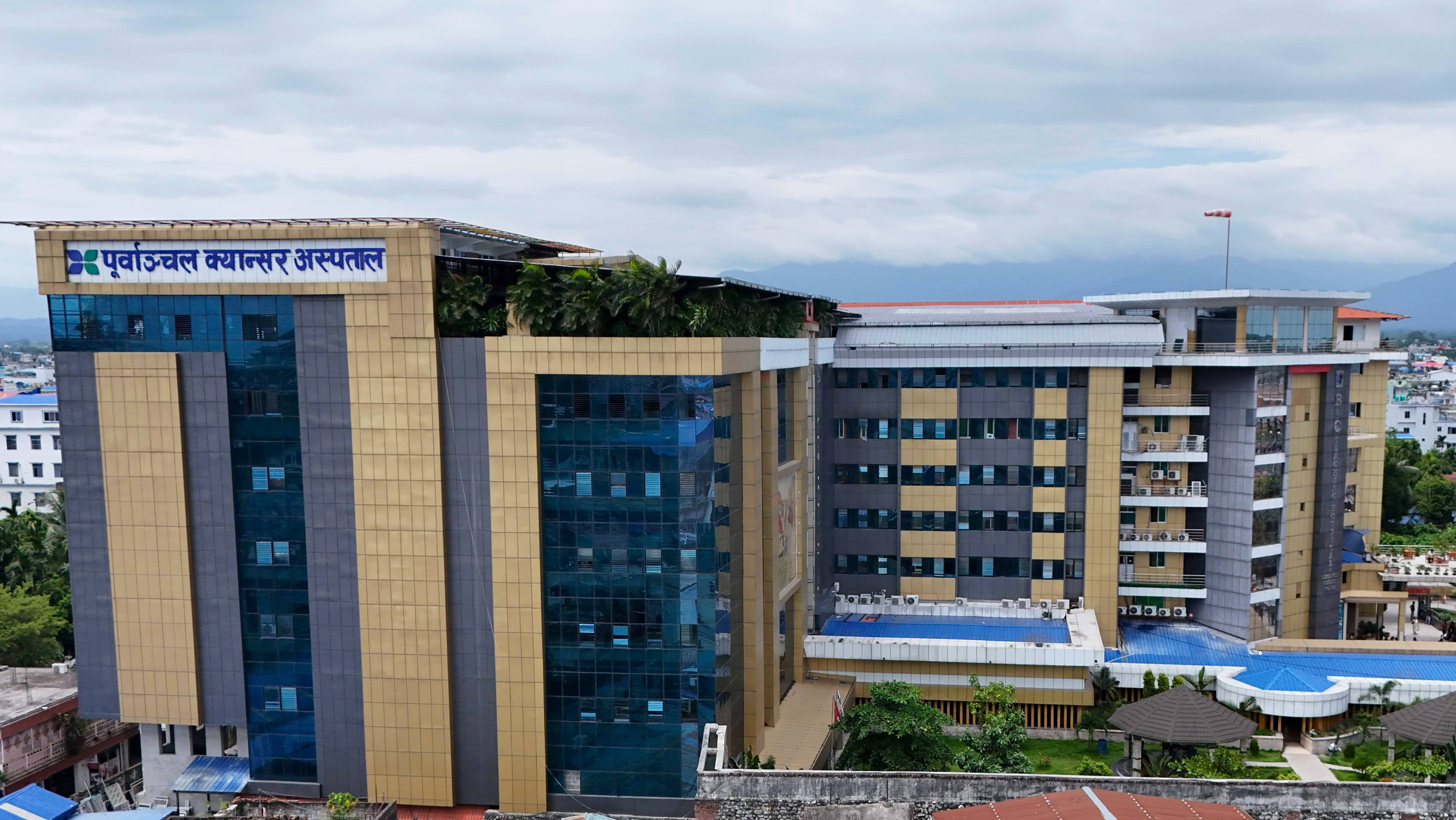
- Purbanchal Cancer Hospital Building

Geography
- Location: Birtamode-05, Jhapa, Koshi Province, Nepal
- Coordinates: 26.6452°N 87.9969°E

Organisation
- Care system: Private
- Type: Multi-specialty tertiary care

Services
- Emergency department: Yes
- Beds: 100+

Helipads
- Helipad: Yes

History
- Founded: 2021

Links
- Website: purbanchalcancerhospital.org
- Lists: Hospitals in Nepal

Purbanchal Cancer Hospital (PCH) is a tertiary-level cancer care center located in Birtamode, Jhapa District, Nepal. The hospital provides services in cancer prevention, diagnosis, treatment, research, and supportive care. It serves patients from eastern Nepal and from bordering regions of India and Bhutan.

PCH offers clinical services in surgical oncology, medical and clinical oncology, radiation oncology, nuclear medicine, diagnostic imaging, rehabilitation, and palliative care. The facility operates 24 hours a day and functions as a referral center for cancer patients within the region.

== History ==
Purbanchal Cancer Hospital was established on 2 March 2021 (2077/11/18) in Birtamode, Jhapa. It was founded by Durga Prasai, Dr. Ram Babu Giri, and Indira Giri with the goal of expanding access to specialized oncology services in eastern Nepal.

Since its establishment, the hospital has expanded its infrastructure and clinical capacity, including the introduction of radiotherapy technologies, upgraded imaging services, and enhanced medical, surgical, and clinical oncology departments. The hospital also developed nuclear medicine services and strengthened pathology and laboratory capabilities.

In 2025, PCH began its academic involvement by launching a Super Specialty Program in Medical Oncology under the National Board of Medical Specialties (NBMS) of Nepal.

== Services and departments ==
Purbanchal Cancer Hospital is a 100-bed cancer center offering multidisciplinary oncology services. Clinical departments include:

- Medical and Clinical Oncology
- Radiation Oncology
- Surgical Oncology
- Breast Oncology
- Hepatobiliary and Pancreatic Oncology
- Gastrointestinal Oncology
- Uro-oncology
- Gynae-oncology
- Musculoskeletal Oncology
- Neuro & Spine Oncology
- Head and Neck Oncology
- Hematology
- Pediatric Hematology

=== Diagnostics and interventional services ===
- Radiology & Imaging: X-ray, Ultrasound, CT, MRI, DEXA, Mammography
- Interventional Oncology: Tissue biopsy, FNAC, CT-guided biopsy, USG-guided biopsy, PTBD
- Nuclear Medicine: including PET-CT
- Pathology & Laboratory Services: Biochemistry, Hematology, Histopathology, Immunohistochemistry, Frozen section, Microbiology, Cytopathology, PCR
- Blood Transfusion & Transfusion Medicine

=== Supportive services ===
- Cardiology
- Internal Medicine
- Anesthesiology & Critical Care
- Reconstructive Surgery
- Pain & Palliative Care
- Dialysis
- Multidisciplinary Tumor Board

=== Patient care services ===
- Outpatient Department
- Inpatient Department
- Emergency care
- Daycare oncology services
- Intensive care units (ICU, CCU, HDU)
- Physiotherapy and Rehabilitation
- Nutrition and Dietetics
- Psychological counseling
- Survivorship support
- Inpatient food services

== Facilities ==
PCH operates with therapeutic and diagnostic technologies for cancer treatment.

=== Radiation therapy ===
- External Beam Radiation Therapy (EBRT): TrueBeam Linear Accelerator with 3D-CRT, IMRT, IGRT, SBRT, SRS, RapidArc.
- Brachytherapy: Intracavitary, intraluminal, and interstitial brachytherapy.

=== Daycare therapeutics ===
- Chemotherapy
- Targeted therapy
- Immunotherapy
- Hormonal therapy

=== Additional facilities ===
- Modular operating theaters
- Diagnostic laboratory
- Telemedicine and teleconsultation
- Digital patient record system

== Mission and outreach ==
PCH conducts community-based activities aimed at promoting cancer awareness, early detection, and patient support. Programs include:

- Cancer awareness campaigns
- Free screening and diagnostic camps
- Early detection initiatives
- Educational programs in schools and communities
- Rehabilitation and survivorship support activities

These programs are intended to improve early diagnosis and support public health initiatives in the region.

== Public health and government schemes ==
Purbanchal Cancer Hospital participates in several national and welfare health programs, including:

- Nepal Government Health Insurance Program
- Social Security Fund (SSF)
- Ex-Servicemen Contributory Health Scheme (ECHS)
- Indigent Citizen Treatment Fund
- Government subsidy for major diseases
- Employment Welfare Fund
- Sahara Nepal Health Scheme

== Infrastructure and support systems ==
The hospital operates with supporting infrastructure such as:

- In-house medical oxygen plant
- Waste management system
- Licensed blood transfusion center
- Laboratory and imaging services
- Ambulance and emergency rescue services, including air evacuation

== Research and training ==
PCH collaborates with national and international institutions on clinical research, diagnostic development, and professional training. The hospital encourages evidence-based practice and multidisciplinary learning.

== Academics ==
In 2025, PCH initiated a Super Specialty Program in Medical Oncology under the NBMS of Nepal. Training covers:

- Medical Oncology
- Radiation Oncology
- Surgical Oncology
- Hematology
- Pathology
- Nuclear Medicine
- Critical Care

The program aims to support the development of oncology specialists in Nepal.
