= Halwar =

Halwar हलवार
- Village of Tulsipur Sub-Metropolitan City
- Location in Nepal
- Coordinates: 28.17°N 82.36°E
- Country: Nepal
- Province: Lumbini Province
- District: Dang Deokhuri District

Government

Population (2011)
  - Total: 14,832
- Time zone: UTC+5:45 (Nepal Time)
- Area code: 082

Halwar is a village and former Village Development Committee that is now part of Tulsipur Sub-Metropolitan City in Dang Deokhuri District in Lumbini Province of south-western Nepal. At the time of the 1991 Nepal census it had a population of 8,182 persons living in 1339 individual households. Bat cave i.e. chamare gupha in Nepali is located here. It is surrounded by Gwar khola(rivulet) in the east and RaniGhat khola(rivulet) in west. Five rivulets flow in this VDC. Now it is merged in Tulsipur Municipality along with Tarigaun and Urahari.
