= Chandrabir Oli =

Nepalese humanitarian

- चन्द्रवीर ओली
- Born: Rolpa District, Kingdom of Nepal
- Other name: Mountain Man
- Known for: Single-handedly carving a multi-kilometer road through the Saat Tale hills in Dang

Chandrabir Oli (Nepali: चन्द्रवीर ओली), popularly known as the Mountain Man of Nepal, is a Nepalese humanitarian known for single-handedly carving a multi-kilometer road through the rocky terrain of the Saat Tale hills in Tulsipur, Dang District.
