= Amritpur =

Amritpur may refer to:

- Amritpur, Uttar Pradesh
- Amritpur, Nepal
- Amritapura, Karnataka
