= Seti Provincial Hospital =

Government hospital in Dhangadi, Nepal

Geography
- Location: Dhangadi, Kailali, Sudurpashchim Province, Nepal
- Coordinates: 28°42′14″N 80°35′16″E

Organisation
- Type: Federal Level Hospital

Services
- Emergency department: Yes
- Beds: 125 beds

History
- Former name: Seti Zonal Hospital
- Opened: 1939 BS (1882–1883)

Links
- Website: https://www.sph.gov.np

The Seti Provincial Hospital (Nepali: सेती प्रादेशिक अस्पताल) is a government hospital located in Dhangadi, Kailali in Sudurpashchim Province of Nepal that provides health services focusing on poor and under-privileged people in [udurpashchim Province.

== History ==
It was established in 1997 BS (1940–1941) as a primary hospital in Sudurpashchim Province. During the visit of King Birendra to Far-Western Development Region it was upgraded to 50 beds in 2040 BS.Hospital Development Committee formed in 1988 (2045 BS)and added 75 bed in 2061 BS.At present it is running 300 beds and referral center of Sudur Paschhim Pradesh. In 2018, it was upgraded as Seti Provincial Hospital from Regional Hospital.

== Services ==
The services provided in Seti Provincial Hospital include:

- Anesthesiology Department
- Laboratory Department
- HIV/ARV, family planning, TB-DOTS, immunization
- Radiology Department
- OPD: Orthopedics, General Surgery, Pediatrics, General Medicine, Dermatology, Neurology, ENT, Gynecology and Obstetrics, Psychiatry
- Dental Department
- Emergency Department
- Pharmacy Unit
- Pathology Department
- ICU
- NICU
- Postmortem
- Dialysis Department
- HDU
