= Salyan District Hospital =

Government hospital in Salyan, Karnali, Nepal

Geography
- Location: Khalanga, Salyan, Karnali Province, Nepal
- Coordinates: 28°22′20″N 82°10′21″E

Organisation
- Type: District Hospital

Services
- Emergency department: Yes
- Beds: 37 beds

History
- Opened: 2024 BS (1967-1968)

Salyan District Hospital is a government hospital located in Khalanga, Salyan in Karnali Province of Nepal. The hospital is considered a crucial resource for healthcare to poor citizens of Salyan district who cannot afford treatments in the private hospitals. The hospital is designed to provide its service for 15 beds, although at present it is operating with 37, which is planned to upgrade up to 50 beds.

== History ==
It was established as government hospital in 2024 BS (1967-1968).

== Departments ==
The facilities provided in Salyan District Hospital include:

- In-patient Services
- Emergency Services
- Radiology Department
- General Surgery Department,
- Maternity Service,
- HIV/ARV,
- Family planning,
- TB-DOTS,
- Immunization,
- Laboratory Services
