= Mahakali Provincial Hospital =

Government hospital in Kanchanpur, Sudurpashchim, Nepal

Geography
- Location: Mahendranagar, Kanchanpur, Sudurpashchim Province, Nepal
- Coordinates: 28°57′50″N 80°11′05″E

Organisation
- Type: Federal Level Hospital

Services
- Emergency department: Yes
- Beds: 150 beds

History
- Former name: Mahakali Regional Hospital
- Opened: 2020 BS (1963–1964)

Links
- Website: https://mph.sudurpashchim.gov.np

Mahakali Provincial Hospital is a government hospital located in Mahendranagar, Kanchanpur in Sudurpashchim Province of Nepal.

== History ==
It was established as a Primary Health Center in 2020 BS (1963–1964) in Kanchanpur District of Nepal. In 2031 BS (1974–1975) it was then upgraded as Kanchanpur District Hospital with 15 beds. The referral center with 50 beds was converted into a regional hospital in 2043 BS (1986–1987). In 2051 BS (1994–1995) the Government of Nepal approved to make it 100 bedded hospital. After the COVID-19 pandemic, in 2076 BS (2019–2020) 50 more beds were added making it a 150 bedded hospital. Following the decision of the Sudurpashchim Provincial Assembly, it was then renamed as Mahakali Provincial Hospital in 2078 BS (2021–2022)

== Services ==
The services provided in Mahakali Provincial Hospital includes:

- Anesthesiology Department
- Laboratory Department
- HIV/ARV, Family planning, TB-DOTS, Immunization
- Radiology Department
- OPD : Orthopedics, General Surgery, General Medicine, ENT, Gynecology and Obstetrics, pediatrics
- Dental Department
- Emergency Department
- Pharmacy Unit
- Pathology Department
- ICU
- NICU
- Postmortem
- HDU
- Hemodialysis
