= Provincial Hospital Bhadrapur =

Hospital in Bhadrapur, Koshi, Nepal

Geography
- Location: Bhadrapur Municipality-08, Jhapa, Koshi Province, Nepal
- Coordinates: 26°33′25″N 88°05′09″E

Organisation
- Type: Province Level Hospital

Services
- Emergency department: Yes
- Beds: 134 beds

History
- Former name: Mechi Provincial Hospital
- Opened: 2015 BS (1958-1959)

Links
- Website: https://provincehospital.koshi.gov.np

Provincial Hospital Bhadrapur, formally known as Mechi Zonal Hospital is a government hospital located in Bhadrapur Municipality, in Koshi Province of Nepal. It is providing health services focusing to the poor and under-privileged people of Jhapa District of Koshi Province.

== History ==
It was established as a 25 bedded hospital in 2015 BS (1958-1959). In 2034 BS (1977-1978), it was upgraded as a 50 bedded hospital. Eventually with the growing demand for healthcare services in Mechi Zone it got expanded to 134 beds. It is the largest hospital in Mechi Zone and the second-largest government hospital in Koshi Province, after the Koshi Hospital.

== Services ==
The Provincial Hospital Bhadrapur provides following services:

- Anesthesiology Department
- Ophthalmology Department
- Laboratory Department
- HIV/ARV, Family planning, TB-DOTS, Immunization
- Radiology Department,
- OPD : General Surgery, Oncology, Cardiology, Homeopathy, Pediatrics, General Medicine, Dermatology, ENT, Gynecology and Obstetrics, Orthopedics, Neurology, Asthma, Nutrition, Nephrology
- Dental Department
- Emergency Department
- Pharmacy Unit
- Pathology Department
- Physiotherapy Department
- ICU
- NICU
- Postmortem
