= Rajkumar Shyamanand Sinha =

Indian Classical Singer (born 1916 – 1994)

- Born: 27 July 1916
- Died: 9 April 1994 (aged 77)
- Occupation: Hindustani classical vocalist
- Father: Raja Bahadur Kirtyanand Sinha

Rajkumar Shyamanand Sinha, also known as Kumar Shyamanand Singh (27 July 1916 – 9 April 1994), was a Hindustani classical singer and the eldest son of Raja Bahadur Kirtyanand Sinha.

== As a classical vocalist ==
Gajendra narayan singh writes about him- “Kumar Shyamanand Singh of Banaili Estate had acquired such excellence in singing Bandish that Surashri Kesar Bai and many such big and renowned artists recognized his talent. If you do not believe me, you may ask Pandit Jasraj. After hearing the Bandish performances of Kumar Saheb, Jasraj wept like a child and wished that he had such Excellence.”

== As Guru ==
Shyamanand Sinha's students included Shri Sitaram Jha, Kumar Jayanand Sinha, Saktinath Jha, Shankaranand Singh, Suryanarayan Jha, Girijanand Sinha, Udyanand Singh, Jayanta Chattopadhyay, Vandana Jha, Amar Nath Jha, Kaushal Kishore Dubey, Shyam Chaitanya Jha, Vijay Kumar Jha, and Ram Sharan Sinha.

Once, when Surshri Kesar Bai was present at one of the music gathering at Champanagar, she heard Kumar Sahib Sing a Bhajan “Dukh haro Dwarkanath” (which later became one of his most popular Bhajans). She was touched by the rendering of the Bhajan, to such an extent that she requested the Kumar Sahib to teach him the above Bhajan and said that she was ready to become his disciple, for this Bhajan. Kumar Sahib taught her the said Bhajan, which she sang at a couple of conferences but never forgot to mention the name of her Guru, for this Bhajan.

== As a patron of classical music ==
Shyamanand Sinha was also a patron of classical music. Sangeetangyon ke Sansmaran, Ustad Vilayat Hussain Khan reportedly stated, "There is no better connoisseur of music in Bihar than Kumar Shyamanand Singh" (free translation of Hindi text). Sinha presented the convocation address at the 11th All India Music Conference of the Prayag Sangit Samiti at Allahabad on 19 December 1948 and also supported the conference.

He supported many Hindustani Classical Music by providing his residence at Champanagar for their musical work and development. Those who received support included Ustad Salamat Ali Khan, Ustad Altaf Hussain Khan of Khurja, and Ustad Bachu Khan Sahib among others.

Shyamanand Sinha invited many maestros for performances, including "Aftab-e-Maushiqi" Ustad Faiyaz Khan, Ustad Bade Ghulam Ali Khan, Ustad Mubarak Ali Khan, Ustad Nisaar Hussain Khan, Pandit D.V. Paluskar, Surshri Kesarbai Kerkar, Sawai Gandharva, Ustad Vilayat Hussain Khan, Ustad Hafiz Ali Khan, Ustad Altaf Hussain Khan of Khurja, Pandit Jasraj, Dilip Chand Vedi, Ustad Mushtaq Hussain Khan, Pandit Narayanrao Vyas, Pandit Basavaraj Rajguru, Ustad Salamat Ali Khan and Nazakat Ali Khan, Malang Khan (Pakhawaj), Allauddin Khan (Sarod), Mushtaq Ali (Sitar), Pandit Bholanath Bhatt, Pandit Chinmay Lahiri, Mahaveer Mullick, Jaduveer Mullick and Ramchatur Mallick. Ustad Yunus Hussain Khan mentions that "Raja Shyamanand Singh of Champanagar" invited him to sing at his son's wedding.

In 1944, Shyamanand Sinha invited Ustad Salamat Ali Khan and Nazakat Ali Khan to perform at Champanagar during Dasehra. He was reportedly impressed by their rendition of "Raag Malkaus" and asked them to extend their stay; they and their father remained for nearly two months. He is credited with facilitating their participation in the All India Music Conference, where they received wider recognition.

Pandit Channulal Mishra's first performance as a young artist was at Champanagar for Shyamanand Sinha.
