= Maa Vishhari Sthan Diwari =

Hindu Temple in Bihar, India

- माँ विषहरि स्थान दिवारी
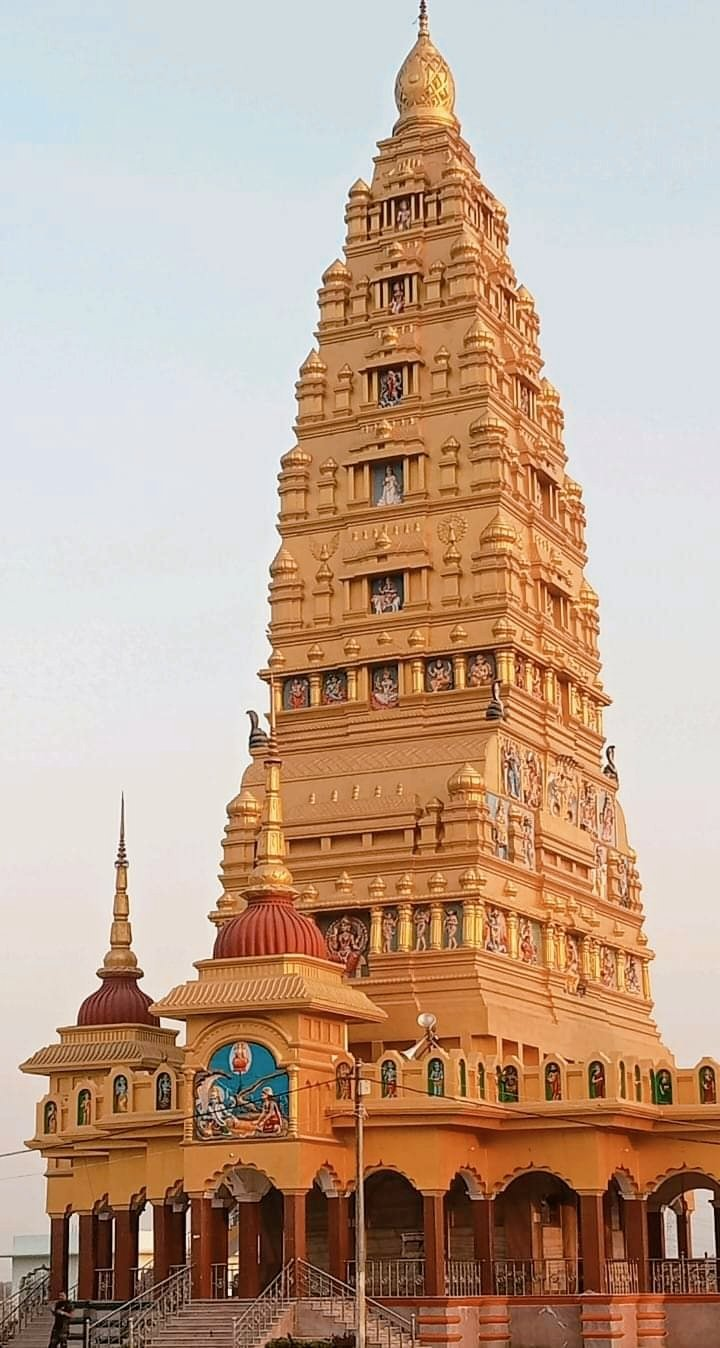
- New temple of Maa Vishhari

- Location of the temple in India

Religion
- Affiliation: Hinduism
- Deity: Goddess Vishhari
- Festival: Shravan

Location
- Location: Simri Bakhtiyarpur Road, Diwari Saharsa, Bihar, 852202
- Country: India
- Interactive map of Maa Vishhari Sthan Diwari
- Coordinates: 25°49′54″N 86°34′56″E

Architecture
- Type: Temple
- Style: Dravidian
- Founder: Banaili (donate land)
- Completed: 2024 (reconstruction)
- Length: 47 m (154 ft)

The Maa Vishhari Sthan Diwari (Hindi: माँ विषहरि स्थान दिवारी), also known as the Diwari Sthan, is a historic Hindu temple complex located in Diwari village within the Saharsa district of Bihar, India. This ancient shrine is dedicated to Goddess Vishhari, an incarnation of the serpent goddess Manasa who is revered as the supreme protector against venomous creatures and the "remover of poison." The site is recognized as a significant Siddhi Peeth, attracting devotees and tantric practitioners from across the Kosi region, as well as from neighboring Nepal and West Bengal. Local folklore suggests the temple houses five divine sisters—Dutala, Manasa, Maa Bhagwati, Vishhara, and Payal making it a unique center for Shakti worship where a sacred "Neer" (holy water) is distributed to pilgrims seeking protection from snakebites

== History ==
The temple's historical legacy is intertwined with the patronage of the Rajbaneli estate, which donated extensive land for its upkeep centuries ago. Historically, the region was a center for spiritual seekers, and the temple remains a focal point for the cultural identity of the Mithila and Kosi regions. In a departure from traditional Vedic customs, the priestly duties at Diwari have been hereditarily performed by members of the Nai (barber) community for generations. Culturally, the temple serves as the epicenter for the annual Vishhari Mahotsav, a state-sponsored festival held during the month of Shravan that culminates on Shravan Purnima. During this period, the temple grounds host a massive fair where traditional folk arts and religious ceremonies are performed, drawing thousands of devotees to the Saharsa district.

== Re-construction ==
Funded by the Bihar government, the temple was re-constructed and reopened in September 2024. The modern 47-metre-tall (154 ft) temple is one of the tallest religious structures in the region. The design of the new Maa Vishhari Sthan blends Nagara (North Indian) and South Indian Dravidian architectural styles, featuring intricate carvings and a grand spire. The project was completed at an approximate cost of ₹12 crore as part of a state initiative to boost religious tourism and improve facilities, including the surrounding temple premises and the local Shivganga pond, to accommodate, as of 2026, the growing influx of pilgrims.

== See also ==
- List of Hindu temples in Bihar
- Saharsa
- Matsyagandha Lake
- Simri Bakhtiyarpur
