= Udayapur District Hospital =

Government hospital in Udyapur, Koshi, Nepal

Geography
- Location: Triyuga Municipality, Udayapur district, Koshi Province, Nepal
- Coordinates: 26°47′51″N 86°41′43″E

Organisation
- Type: District Level Hospital

Services
- Emergency department: Yes
- Beds: 50 beds

Helipads
- Helipad: No

History
- Former name: District Hospital Gaighat

Udayapur District Hospital (Nepali: उदयपुर जिल्ला अस्पताल) is a 50 bedded government hospital located in Triyuga Municipality of Udayapur district in Koshi Province, Nepal. It provides health service to about 350,000 people of the Udayapur district.

== Services ==
The services provided in Udayapur District Hospital includes:

- Laboratory Department
- HIV/ARV, Family planning, TB-DOTS, Immunization
- Radiology Department
- OPD : General Surgery, Pediatrics, General Medicine, Gynecology and Obstetrics
- Emergency Department
- Pharmacy Unit
- ICU
- Postmortem
