= Kanti Children's Hospital =

Hospital in Maharajgunj, Kathmandu, Nepal

Kanti Children's Hospital कान्ति बाल अस्पताल
- Ministry of Health and Population (Nepal)

Geography
- Location: Maharajgunj, Kathmandu, Nepal
- Coordinates: 27°44′05″N 85°19′43″E

Organisation
- Type: Specialist

Services
- Beds: 350
- Speciality: Pediatric hospital

History
- Opened: 1963

Links
- Website: www.kantichildrenhospital.gov.np
- Lists: Hospitals in Nepal

Kanti Children's Hospital (Nepali: कान्ति बाल अस्पताल) is a pediatric hospital in Maharajgunj, Kathmandu, Nepal. The hospital is administered and regulated by the Kanti Children's Hospital Development Board, an autonomous body under the Ministry of Health, Government of Nepal.

The hospital treats children from all over the country and other hospitals. It has a capacity of 350 beds. There are 36 pediatricians, 8 pediatric surgeons, 45 medical officers, 84 general nurses, 25 technicians and paramedics and 107 support staff. The hospital also runs a Post Graduate Degree class with accreditation from National Academy of Medical Education and Sciences (NAMS), Nepal.

== History ==
The hospital was established in 1963 with support from the government of the USSR, as a general hospital with fifty beds. In 1968 Kanti Hospital was handed over to the Ministry of Health of Nepal by the USSR government. From 1970 the hospital started providing its services for treatment of children up to the age of 14.

== Faculties ==
- Pediatric Medicine
- Pediatric Surgery
- Pediatric Orthopedics
- Pediatric Dermatology
- Emergency Facilities
- Physiotherapy
- Nutrition Room
- Vaccination Room
- Records Section
- Library

== Special wards ==
- Burn Ward
- Oncology Ward
- Cardiac Ward
- Pediatric Intensive Care Unit (PICU)
- Neonatal Intensive Care Unit (NICU)
- Surgical Intensive Care Unit (SICU)
- Neonatal Intermediate Care Unit (NIMCU)
- Post Operative Ward

== Controversy ==
The hospital has become a target for drug users. Toilets of the hospital are being used by drug addicts as a hide out to use drugs. However, the government of Nepal and hospital management have not taken any action against it.
