= CIWEC Clinic Travel Medicine Center =

Geography
- Location: Kathmandu, Nepal

History
- Founded: 1982

Links
- Website: ciwec-clinic.com
- Lists: Hospitals in Nepal

CIWEC Clinic Travel Medicine Center, also known as CIWEC Hospital, is a specialist in travel related illnesses in Nepal. It opened in 1982. It is the first travel medicine center situated in Nepal.
