= Binaytara =

U.S. nonprofit organization

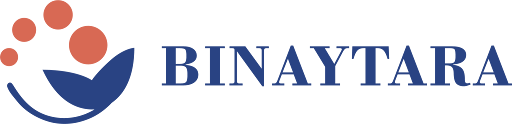
- Founded: 2007 AD
- Founder: Binay Shah and Tara Shah
- Type: Nonprofit organization (IRS exemption status): 501(c)(3)
- Legal status: 501(c)(3) tax-exempt
- Purpose: Reduce cancer health disparities through care, advocacy, research, and education
- Headquarters: 3380 146th Pl SE, Suite 340, Bellevue, WA 98007, United States
- Location: Bellevue, Washington
- Region served: Worldwide
- Methods: Education, Research, Advocacy, Clinical Services
- Website: binaytara.org

Binaytara (formerly known as Binaytara Foundation) is a global cancer non-profit organization founded in 2007 AD by Dr. Binay Shah, an oncologist and his wife, Tara Shah, with a mission to reduce cancer health disparities and improve access to cancer care worldwide. Binaytara provides medical education for oncology/hematology clinicians, conducts and publishes implementation science research, advocacy to improve access to cancer care, and global oncology programs to improve cancer care and delivery around the world.

Binaytara is a Four-Star Charity on Charity Navigator with a 99% score.

== History ==
BinayTara was founded in 2007. Over the years, the organization has launched several healthcare initiatives in in the US, Nepal, India and Nigeria, focusing on improving access to cancer diagnosis, treatment, and professional medical education.

BinayTara has launched a telemedicine initiative connecting physicians in the United States with doctors at Manipal College of Medical Sciences in Pokhara, Nepal.

== Current Programs and Initiatives ==
=== Cancer Care in Nepal ===
I. Binaytara Health Clinic

Binaytara established the Binaytara Clinic in Janakpur, Nepal, which provides cancer care services. This clinic will serve patients from Nepal and neighboring regions of India, addressing the critical shortage of cancer care facilities in South Asia. Binaytara’s Clinic team also conducts free health camps, cancer screenings and HPV testing in the surrounding communities of Janakpur utilizing female community healthcare volunteers.

II. '''Binaytara Cancer Hospital in Nepal'''

Binaytara is expanding its efforts to improve cancer care access in southern Nepal and Bihar, India. The organization is currently constructing a 200-bed hospital to provide comprehensive cancer treatment. The facility will incorporate advanced medical technologies and establish specialized departments for different cancer types to improve treatment quality and patient care. The project involves collaboration with local and provincial governments, as well as international partners, to secure funding and resources.

=== Cancer Care in Nigeria ===
Binaytara signed a Memorandum of Understanding with Federal Health Clinic Ebutte Mette in Lagos, Nigeria to partner on improving their cancer care. In collaboration with local governments and international partners, Binaytara provides clinical training, fellowships, and research infrastructure support to build local oncology capacity.

=== Education Programs ===
BinayTara organizes continuing medical education (CME) conferences and publishes the International Journal of Cancer Care and Delivery (IJCCD). These programs are designed to disseminate the latest developments and best practices in oncology to healthcare professionals worldwide.

=== Bone marrow transplant in Nepal ===
The foundation played a pivotal role in establishing Nepal’s first bone marrow transplant program at the Civil Service Hospital in Kathmandu. This initiative marked a major milestone in Nepal’s medical history, enabling patients to receive life-saving transplants within the country.

== See also ==
- Health in Nepal
- Oncology
