= B & B Hospital =

Geography
- Location: Gwarko, Lalitpur, Nepal
- Coordinates: 27.666496°N 85.329720°E

Organisation
- Care system: Private
- Type: District General

Services
- Emergency department: Yes
- Beds: 120

History
- Founded: 6 November 1997

Links
- Website: www.bbhospital.com.np
- Lists: Hospitals in Nepal

B & B Hospital (Baidya and Banskota Hospital) is a private hospital located in Nepal was founded in 1997.

It was established by Dr. Jagdish Lal Baidya and Dr. Ashok K. Banskota. So it is called B&B It is spread over 2.26 acres. Hospital offers various disciplinary services which include orthopedics, general surgery and urology, general medicine, plastic/cosmetic & maxillofacial surgery, gynecology and obstetrics, neuroscience, pediatrics, otorhinolaryngology, cardiology, oncology, cardiothoracic & vascular surgery, dental, psychiatry, dermatology & venereology, nephology, ophthalmology, pneumatology, anesthesiology, and nutrition. Hospital has 120 doctors and 500+ staff members.

== Services ==
Services provided range from emergency and trauma care, outpatient department, in patient services, OT and surgical services, clinical laboratory, pharmacy, sociotherapy, optical diagnostics services, and radiology and imaging services.

- Department of Orthopaedic Surgery- services include joint replacement surgery, arthroscopy and sports medicine, spine surgery and spinal deformity correction, paediatric orthopaedics, arm and hand surgery.
- General Surgery and Urology- provides urology and laparoscopic services, as well as general surgery procedures.
- General Medicine- services include upper gastrointestinal endoscopy, colonoscopy, ERCP, haemodialysis, peritoneal dialysis, pulmonary function testing.
- Plastic, Cosmetic and Maxilloficial Surgery- microvascular surgery, reconstructive, aesthetic and cosmetic operations are performed, as well as maxillofacial operations that manage simple to complex facial bone fractures.
- Gynaecology and Obstetrics- the department deals with all obstetric emergencies, including prenatal and antenatal care, normal and abnormal deliveries, as well as providing safe abortion services, family planning and counseling services. All gynaecological procedures are performed, including laparoscopic major gynaecological surgery, colposcopy, hysterectomy and uro-gynaecological operations.
- Neuroscience- the department is equipped to handle all kinds of head and spinal problems, such as various traumas, tumors, congenital anomalies, vascular problems, etc. The department is also involved in the hospital's academic activities.
- Paediatrics-the department provides care for newborns admitted with cases like AGE, pneumonia, meningitis, etc.
- ENT- departmental services include microsurgery of the ear, surgery of the nose and the throat, head and neck surgery.
- Cardiology- services include emergency management and intensive care, cardiac catheterization, blood pressure and heart rhythm monitoring, angiography, angioplasty & stenting, device implantation, peripheral interventions, echocardiography and color doppler.
- Oncology- the hospital's cancer centre provides medical and surgical treatment to patients, including daily OPD consultations, chemotherapy, treatment planning and surgical procedures.
- Cardiothoracic and Vascular Surgery
- Dental
- Psychiatry
- Dermatology and Venereology- active in both academic and research activities, the department offers consultations for skin and sexually transmitted diseases and cosmetological problems, allergo-diagnostic tests, electro-catheterization, mole excision and skin biopsies.
- Nephrology- the services offered include OPD, pre- and post-transplant follow up, and haemodialysis.
- Dermatology & Venerology
