= Karnali Provincial Hospital =

Government hospital in Karnali province of Nepal

Geography
- Location: Surkhet, Karnali Province, Nepal
- Coordinates: 28°36′05″N 81°35′31″E

Organisation
- Type: Federal Level Hospital

Services
- Emergency department: Yes
- Beds: 300 beds

History
- Former names: Mid-Western Regional Hospital, Surkhet
- Opened: 2019 BS (1962-1963)

Links
- Website: https://provincehospital.karnali.gov.np

Karnali Provincial Hospital aka Provincial Hospital, Surkhet is a government hospital located in Kalagaun of Surkhet district in Karnali Province of Nepal. It is one of the three hospitals in Nepal where kidney transplantation is done for free.

== History ==
It was established in 2019 BS (1962-1963) as a health center in Gothikada of Surkhet district. It was then shifted to Surkhet valley in 2024 BS (1967-1968). Whereas, in 2029 BS (1972-1973) it was upgraded as Surkhet District Hospital with 15 sanctioned beds. In 2049 BS (1992-1993), it got upgraded to 25 bedded hospital. It was again upgraded to 50 bedded Mid-Western Regional Hospital, Surkhet in 2062 BS (2005-2006). In 2075 BS (2018-2019) it got upgraded as 300 bedded Karnali Provincial Hospital An agreement has been done recently to upgrade the Karnali Provincial Hospital into a 500-bed tertiary-level hospital.

== Departments ==
The functional departments in Karnali provincial hospital includes:

- Inpatient Services: General Medicine, Surgery, NICU, PICU, Surgical intensive care unit(SICU), NIMCU, PIMCU, Burn unit, Oncology, Cardiology, Observation, Cabin / Paying beds.
- OPD : Orthopedics, Surgical, Pediatrics, Medical, Dermatology, Psychiatric, ENT, Gynecology, Neurology, Asthma, HIV/ARV, Family planning, TB-DOTS, Immunization, Physiotherapy, Nutrition
- Laboratory Department
- Emergency Department
- Radiology Department
- Pharmacy Department
- Dental Department
