= Tarigaun =

Tarigaun टरिगाउँ
- Village of Tulsipur Sub-Metropolitan City
- Location in Nepal
- Coordinates: 28.10°N 82.28°E
- Country: Nepal
- Province: Lumbini Province
- District: Dang Deokhuri District

Population (1991)
  - Total: 7,685
- Time zone: UTC+5:45 (Nepal Time)

Tarigaun is a village and former Village Development Committee that is now part of Tulsipur Sub-Metropolitan City in Dang Deokhuri District in Lumbini Province of south-western Nepal. It was annexed into Tulsipur in 2014. At the time of the 1991 Nepal census it had a population of 7,685 persons living in 1087 individual households.

== Transportation ==
Dang Airport lies in Tarigaun offering flights to Kathmandu.
