= AMDA Hospital =

Pediatric hospital in Nepal

AMDA Hospital/Siddhartha Children and Women Hospital

Geography
- Location: Lumbini, Nepal

Organisation
- Type: Specialist

Services
- Beds: 100
- Speciality: Children's hospital

History
- Opened: November 1998

Links
- Website: www.amda.org.np/siddhartha-children-and-women-hospital.html
- Lists: Hospitals in Nepal

The AMDA hospital - Butwal, also known as Siddhartha Children and Women Hospital, was established in November 1998 in Butwal Municipality, Nepal. This is the first pediatric hospital outside the capital city Kathmandu. This hospital has about 100 beds and has provided service to 22,780 patients by 2061 BS.

The hospital was established by a joint initiative of the Public-Private Partnership; the Nepal government, the municipality of Butwal, the Federation of Nepalese Chambers of Commerce and Industry (FNCCI), and AMDA. The hospital is constructed in about 10 bighas of land given by the local authority. The hospital offers NICU and PICU services.

== History ==
This hospital was funded by Japanese INGO. According to the website of this hospital, a Japanese newspaper ‘Mainichi' had taken the initiative to raise funds for the construction of this hospital and a Japanese architect named Mr. Ando Tadao had volunteered to design the hospital. The hospital itself has been named after Buddha's childhood name, Siddhartha.

The hospital was built using donations from the Great Hanshin earthquake victims who themselves were helped by Nepal in the aftermath of the 1995 quake.

== Building ==
The structure is architecturally significant. It was designed by notable Japanese architect Tadao Ando, a past winner of the 1995 Pritzker Architecture Prize.
