= Teku Hospital =

Public hospital in Kathmandu, Bagmati, Nepal

Sukraraj Tropical and Infectious Disease Hospital
- Ministry of Health and Food Safety (Nepal)
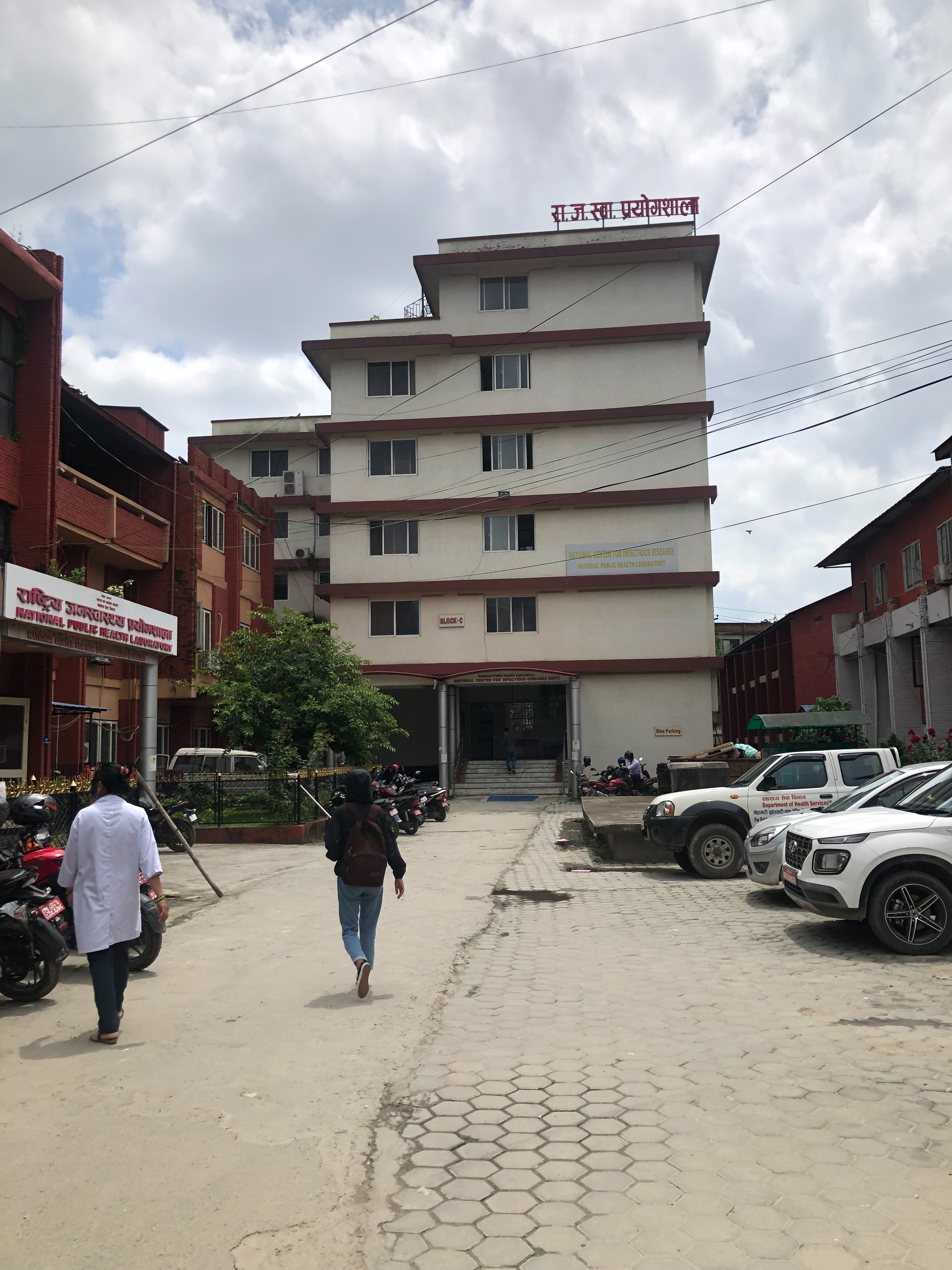

Geography
- Location: Teku, Bagmati, Nepal
- Coordinates: 27.695785489751717°N 85.3063271865262°E

Organisation
- Care system: National referral hospital
- Type: Public

Services
- Beds: 100

History
- Opened: 1933; 93 years ago

Links
- Website: stidh.gov.np
- Lists: Hospitals in Nepal

Sukraraj Tropical and Infectious Disease Hospital (Nepali: शुक्रराज ट्रपिकल तथा सरूवा रोग अस्पताल), named after Shukraraj Shastri, commonly known as Teku Hospital, is a public hospital in Teku, Kathmandu. It is the only hospital in Nepal especially designated for the treatment of tropical and infectious diseases. The hospital was established in 1933. It has a 100-bed inpatient service. It has three ICU beds and six cabin beds. It is a national referral hospital which takes in patients referred from all over the country. It also provides training to medical students. Dr. Anup Bastola is the current director of the hospital.

== Isolation ward ==
An isolation ward was set up at the hospital with support from the World Bank during the avian flu epidemic. The development was later neglected and not a single patient had received treatment there. Rup Narayan Khatiwada of the hospital was quoted as saying that the hospital was not equipped to treat deadly diseases; it had "placed eight beds and locked the room" as they did not know "about the basic requirements to be fulfilled to meet the standards of an isolation ward." In June 2019, the Epidemiology and Disease Control Division sought help from the UN Health Agency in bringing the isolation ward up to standards. A team of international experts submitted a report of recommendations. After the start of the coronavirus pandemic, the hospital took to studying the report but was sceptical about being able to bring the ward into operation due to the cost involved and the difficulty in getting the work done under the public procurement procedures.

== Coronavirus pandemic ==
Teku Hospital is the primary hospital in the treatment of COVID-19 coronavirus. The staff at the hospital were provided training and its six cabin beds were designated the makeshift isolation care units for handling suspected cases of the disease. It was criticised for its handling of the crisis after it emerged that the hospital had continued to discharge suspected patients before getting the test results despite the fact that the first and only confirmed patient of the disease had also been discharged one week before the test came back positive. Later, one Arab national who had been admitted suspected of carrying the disease fled the hospital. The Health Ministry said it would deploy police personnel to guard the patients.
