= Dang Airport =

Dang Airport/Tarigaun Airport दाङ विमानस्थल/टरिगाँउ विमानस्थल
- IATA: DNP; ICAO: VNDG

Summary
- Airport type: Public
- Owner: Government of Nepal
- Operator: Civil Aviation Authority of Nepal
- Serves: Dang District and Tulsipur
- Location: Tulsipur, Nepal
- Elevation AMSL: 640 m / 2,100 ft
- Coordinates: 28°06′39″N 082°17′39″E

Map
- Location of airport in Nepal

Runways
Direction	Length		Surface
Direction	m	ft	Surface
16/34	832	2,730	Asphalt

Dang Airport (IATA: DNP, ICAO: VNDG), also known as Tarigaun Airport, is a domestic airport located in Tulsipur serving Dang District, a district in Lumbini Province in Nepal.

== Facilities ==
The airport is at an elevation of 2,100 feet (640 m) above mean sea level. It has one runway which is 832 metres (2,730 ft) in length.

== Airlines and destinations ==
Airlines	Destinations	Refs.
Nepal Airlines	Kathmandu	

== Access ==
The airport is located at Rapti Highway. It is able to serve the whole district, as it lies 23 km (14 mi) west of Ghorahi.
