= Province Hospital Janakpur =

Government hospital in Janakpurdham, Madhesh, Nepal

Madhesh Institute of Health Sciences, Provincial Hospital Janakpur

Geography
- Location: Janakpurdham, Madhesh Province, Nepal
- Coordinates: 26°44′02″N 85°55′25″E

Organisation
- Type: Provincial Level Hospital / Medical Academic Collage

Services
- Emergency department: Yes
- Beds: 200 beds

History
- Former name: Janakpur Zonal Hospital
- Opened: 2013 BS (1956-1957)

Links
- Website: https://mihs.edu.np/

Madhesh Institute of Health Sciences, Provincial Hospital Janakpur is a government hospital located in Janakpurdham in Madhesh Province of Nepal.

== History ==
It was established as a Janaki Public Hospital in 2013 BS (1956-1957). It was then upgraded to 15 bedded hospital in 2024 BS (1967-1968). Whereas, in 2026 BS (1969-1970) it was again upgraded to 25 bedded hospital. In 2028 BS (1971-1972), it was upgraded as Janakpur Zonal Hospital with 50 beds. In 2048 BS (1991-1992) it was upgraded to 100 beds and now it's running as a 200 bedded Provincial Hospital.

== Departments ==
According to the centre, following departments are providing their services:

- Out Patient Department (OPD) : Orthopedics, General Medicine, Pediatrics, Surgery, Neurology, Gynecology
- Dental Department
- Pathology Department
- Laboratory Department
- Radiology Department
