= Human Organ Transplant Centre =

Government hospital in Bhaktapur, Bagmati, Nepal

Geography
- Location: Dudhpati-17, Bhaktapur, Bagmati Province, Nepal
- Coordinates: 27°40′21″N 85°25′19″E

Organisation
- Type: Tertiary Organ Transplant Hospital

Services
- Emergency department: Yes
- Beds: 100 beds

History
- Opened: 2012

Links
- Website: https://hotc.org.np

Human Organ Transplant Centre aka Shahid Dharmabhakta National Transplant Centre is a government specialized tertiary organ transplant hospital located in Dudhpati-17, Bhaktapur, in Bagmati Province of Nepal.

== History ==
It was established in 2012 by the decision of Ministry of Health and Population, Nepal. The outdoor services of the hospital was inaugurated by the then Health Minister of Nepal Rajendra Mahato whereas the indoor services of the hospital was inaugurated by the then Health Secretary of Nepal Pravin Mishra. The first liver transplant, kidney transplant and open heart surgery in Nepal were performed here.

== Departments ==
The departments Human Organ Transplant Centre includes:

- Nephrology and Renal Transplant Medicine
- Hepato-pancreatic and Biliary Surgery
- Urology
- Cardiothoracic and Vascular Surgery
- Gastroenterology and Hepatology
- Anesthesiology and Critical Care
- Radiology Department
- Pathology Department
- Physiotherapy
- Pharmacy Department
- Nursing Department
