= Bheri Hospital =

Government hospital in Nepalgunj, Lumbini, Nepal

Geography
- Location: Nepalgunj, Lumbini Province, Nepal
- Coordinates: 28°03′10″N 81°37′04″E

Organisation
- Type: Federal Level Hospital

Services
- Emergency department: Yes
- Beds: 350 beds

History
- Former name: Bheri Zonal Hospital
- Opened: 1947 BS (1890–1891)

Links
- Website: https://bherihospital.gov.np

Bheri Hospital is a government hospital located in Nepalgunj in Lumbini Province of Nepal. More than 200,000 people living in Lumbini Province, Karnali Province, and Sudurpashchim Province are highly benefitted from this hospital. It provides IPD, Emergency and OPD services.

== History ==
It was established in 1947 BS (1890–1891) under the name of Prithvi Vir Hospital Dispensary. It was then named as Ratna Rajya Laxmi Devi Maternity Home in 2016 BS (1959–1960). Whereas, in 2022 BS (1965–1966) it was named as Bheri Zonal Hospital with 50 sanctioned bed. In 2043 BS (1986–1987), it got upgraded to 100 bedded hospital. It was again upgraded to 300 bedded central hospital in 2075 BS (2018–2019).

== Departments ==
The functional departments in Bheri hospital includes:

- Laboratory Department
- Hemodialysis Department
- Social Service Unit (SSU)
- Geriatric
- Antiretroviral Therapy Center( ART)
- Radiology Department
- NICU
- OPD : Orthopedics, Surgery, Pediatrics, General Medicine, Dermatology, Psychiatric, ENT, Gynecology
- Dental Department
- ICU
- One Stop Crisis Management Center (OCMC)
