= Tri Chandra military Hospital =

Hospital in Kathmandu, Bagmati, Nepal

Tri Chandra Military Hospital
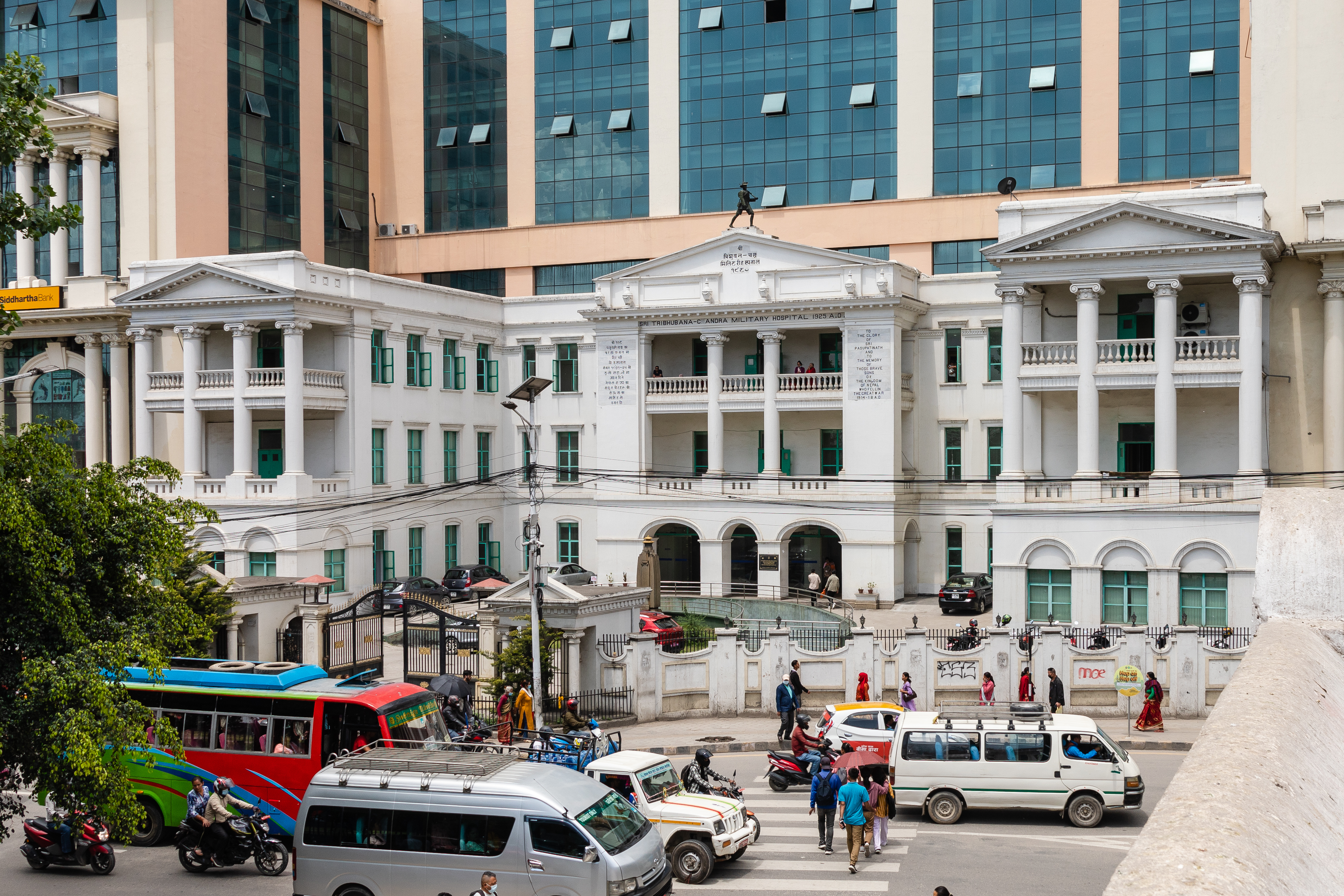
- Tri Chandra Military Hospital in 2023

Geography
- Location: Kathmandu, Bagmati, Nepal
- Coordinates: 27.7037°N 85.3135°E

Organisation
- Affiliated university: Nepalese Army Institute of Health Sciences

History
- Founded: 1925

Tri Chandra Military Hospital (Nepali त्रिचन्द्र सैनिक अस्पताल, Tri chandra Sainik Aspatal) is an army hospital established in 1925 and run by Nepal Army. It was constructed with the help from the British after First World War. The hospital is located in Tudikhel, Kathmandu. In 1990, services of this hospital were shifted to Shree Birendra Hospital and the hospital was closed for renovation. In August 2018, Tri Chandra hospital was reopened. The fund to renovate the hospital was gathered from army welfare fund

It is under the control of Nepal Army Institute of Health Science (NAIHS).

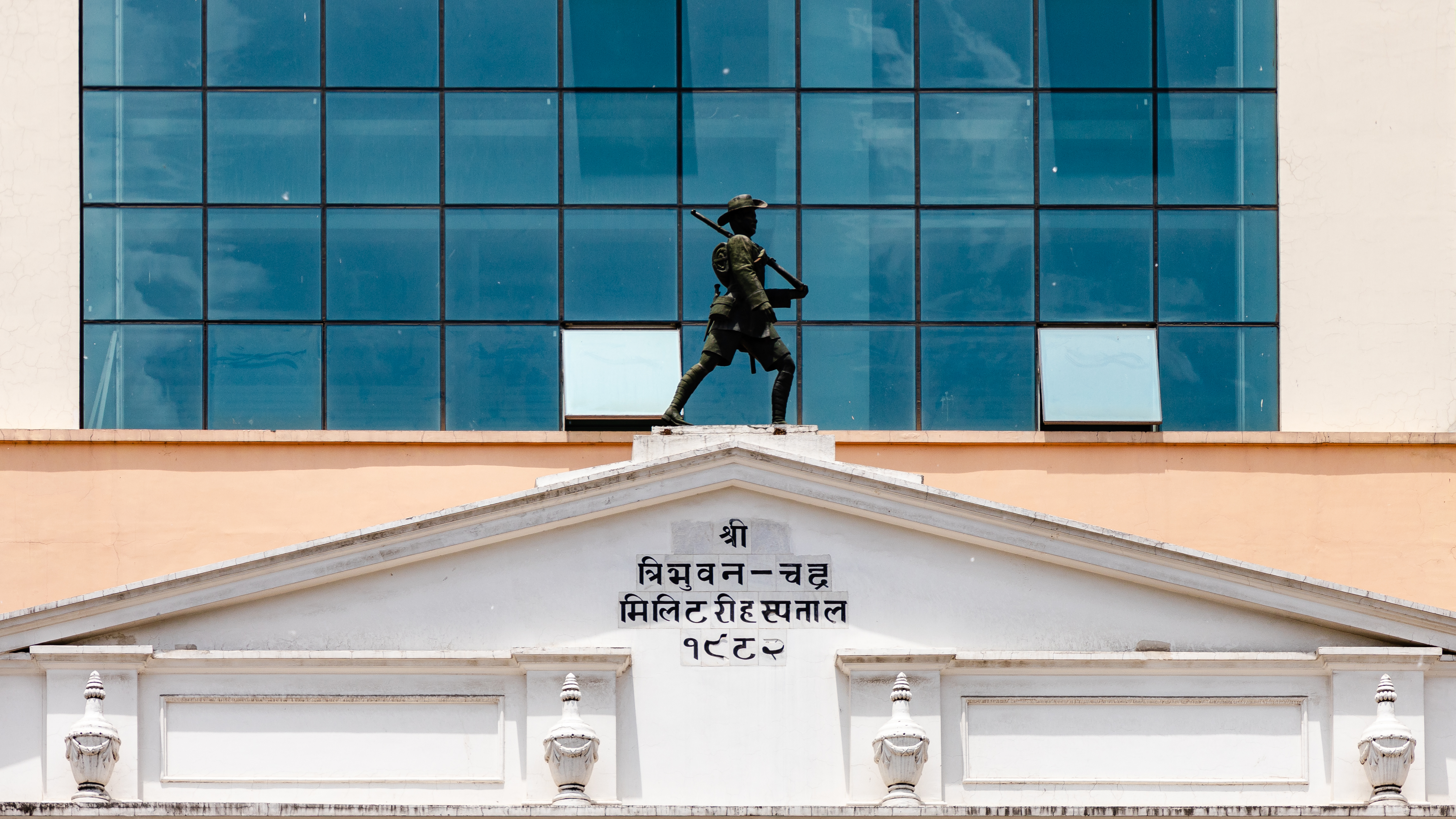
Tri Chandra military Hospital, Kathmandu 2023

== Facilities ==
- dental service
- pharmacy
- pediatric
- physiotherapy
- pathology
- radiotherapy
