= Urahari =

Urahari उरहरी
- Village of Tulsipur Sub-Metropolitan City
- Location in Nepal
- Coordinates: 28.06°N 82.26°E
- Country: Nepal
- Province: Lumbini Province
- District: Dang Deokhuri District

Population (1991)
  - Total: 8,764
- Time zone: UTC+5:45 (Nepal Time)

Urahari is a village and former Village Development Committee that is now part of Tulsipur Sub-Metropolitan City in Dang Deokhuri District in Lumbini Province of south-western Nepal. In 2014, Urahari VDC was annexed into Tulsipur. At the time of the 1991 Nepal census it had a population of 8,764 persons living in 1288 individual households.

== Media ==
To Promote local culture Urahari had one FM radio station Radio Saryu Ganga - 104 MHz.
