= Civil Service Hospital =

Hospital in Kathmandu, Bagmati, Nepal

Geography
- Location: Minbhawan, Kathmandu, Bagmati Province, Nepal
- Coordinates: 27°41′21″N 85°20′31″E

Organisation
- Type: Federal Level Hospital

Services
- Emergency department: Yes
- Beds: 132 beds

History
- Opened: 2008

Links
- Website: https://csh.gov.np

Civil Service Hospital is an autonomous government institution under the Ministry of General Administration (MoGA) located in Minbhawan, Kathmandu in Bagmati Province of Nepal. The hospital building was built by the joint venture of People's Republic of China and the Government of Nepal in 2008.

== History ==
The foundation stone of Civil service hospital was laid by prime minister Sher Bahadur Deuba and it was handed over as a 132 bedded fully equipped hospital in 2008. It was inaugurated by the prime minister Madhav Kumar Nepal in 2009. In 2010, the hospital started its services including OPD, Emergency Department, Inpatient and Surgery Department.

== Services ==
The services provided by Civil Service Hospital includes:

- Anesthesiology Department,
- Cardiology Department,
- Gastroenterology Department,
- Oncology: Radiation Oncology and Medical Oncology,
- Urology Department,
- Neurology Department,
- Hematology Department,
- Physiotherapy Department,
- Ophthalmology Department,
- Laboratory Department,
- Hemodialysis Department,
- HIV/ARV, Family planning, TB-DOTS, Immunization,
- Radiology Department,
- NICU,
- Department of Nursing,
- OPD : Orthopedics, General Surgery, Pediatrics, General Medicine, Dermatology, Psychiatric, ENT, Gynecology and Obstetrics, Dermatology,
- Dental Department, Oral and Maxillofacial Surgery Department,
- ICU,
- Pharmacy Unit
