= Purandhara =

Purandhara पुरनधारा
- Village Development Committee
- Location in Nepal
- Coordinates: 28.20°N 82.09°E
- Country: Nepal
- Province: Lumbini Province
- District: Dang Deokhuri District

Population (1991)
  - Total: 11,981
- Time zone: UTC+5:45 (Nepal Time)

Purandhara is a town and Village Development Committee in Dang Deokhuri District in Lumbini Province of south-western Nepal, near to Salyan. At the time of the 1991 Nepal census it had a population of 11,981 persons living in 2033 individual households. It is notable as the home of Chandra Bahadur Dangi, the shortest man in the world.
