= Birendra Hospital =

Hospital in Kathmandu, Bagmati, Nepal

Shree Birendra Hospital श्री विरेन्द्र अस्पताल

Geography
- Location: Kathmandu, Bagmati, Nepal
- Coordinates: 27.7086444°N 85.2912134°E

Organisation
- Affiliated university: Nepalese Army Institute of Health Sciences

Services
- Beds: 635

History
- Founded: 1990

Links
- Website: www.birendrahospital.mil.np

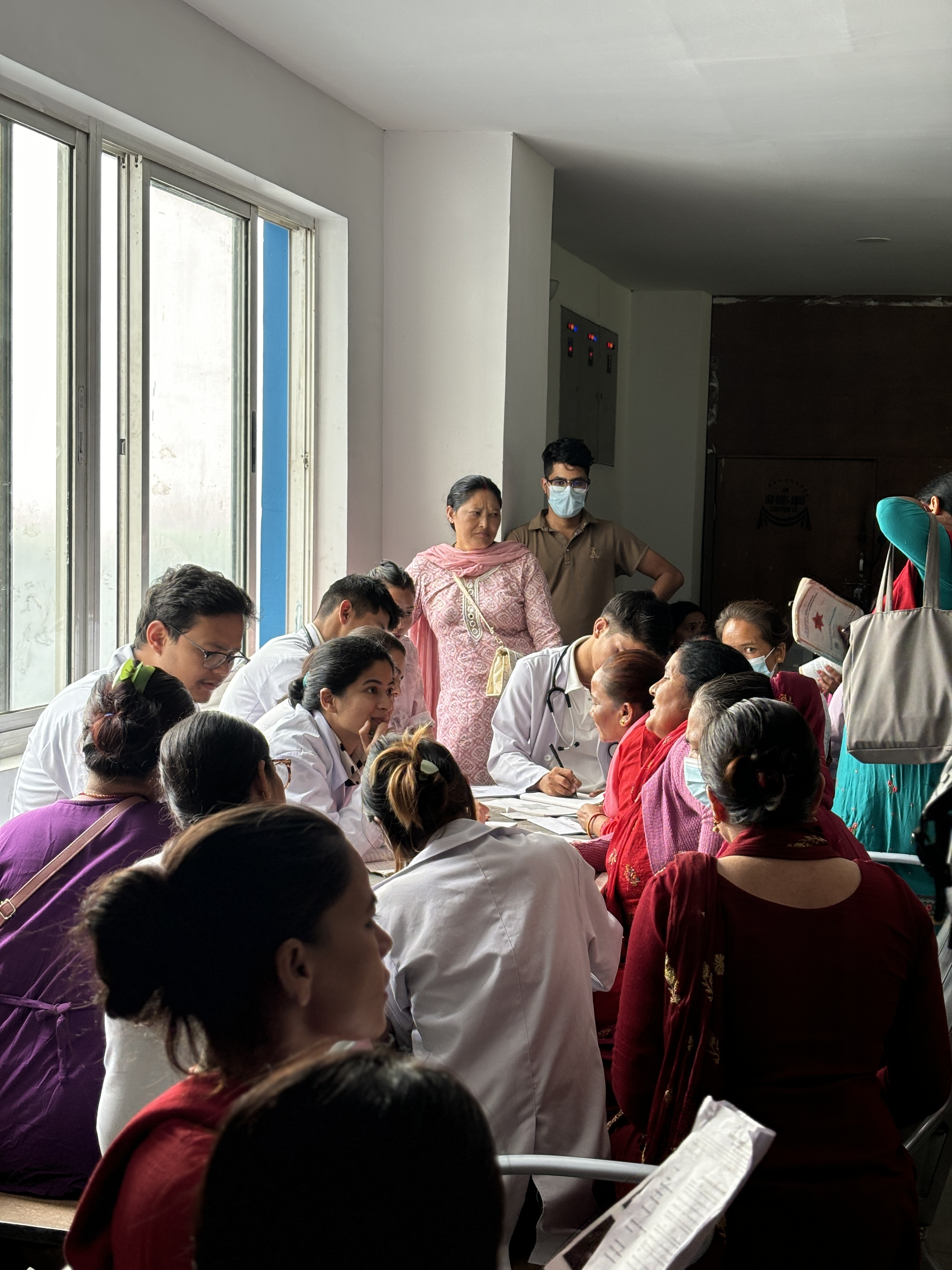

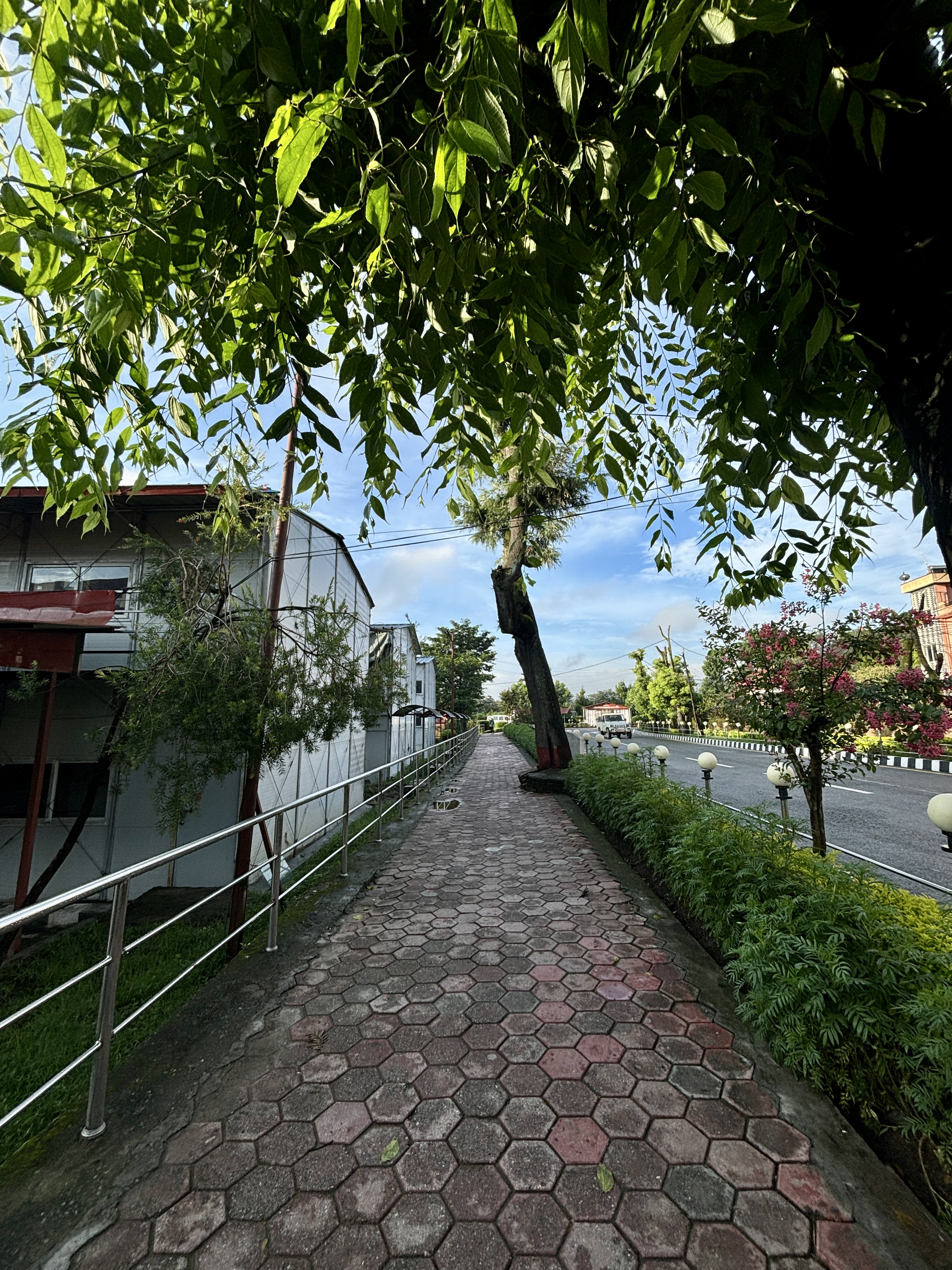
SBH during morning

Shree Birendra Hospital (Nepali: श्री विरेन्द्र अस्पताल) originally Birendra Sainik Hospital (विरेन्द्र शैनिक अस्पताल) is an army hospital established in 1990 and run by Nepal Army. The hospital is located in Chhauni, Kathmandu. Initially, the hospital was open to army personnel, retired army personnel and their family only. From 2017, the hospital also started outpatient service for civilians. As of August 2023, the hospital has 635 beds and has a plan to upgrade to 900 beds to cater for civilians. In 2020, the hospital also started providing free hemodialysis service to the civilians.

It is also a teaching hospital for postgraduate teaching program run by Nepal Army Institute of Health Science. This hospital is under the command of Nepal Army Medical Corps (NAMC) under the Director-General of Medical Services of Nepal Army Headquarters.

The hospital also publishes its own medical journal named Journal of Shree Birendra Hospital.

== Notable events ==
- Some members of the Royal Family of Nepal were treated in this hospital after the Nepalese royal massacre.

== Facilities ==
- Emergency Medicine
- Anesthesia
- Surgery
- Pathology
- Medicine and Pulmonology
- Nephrology
- Pediatrics
- Dermatology, Venereology and Leprosy
- Orthopedics
- Otorhinolaryngology
- Ophthalmology
- Obstetrics and Gynecology
- Dental Surgery
- Radiology
- Neuro Psychiatry
- Haematology and Oncology
- Physical and Rehabilitation Medicine Centre
- Department of Food & Nutrition

== See also ==
- Tri Chandra military Hospital
