= Amritpur, Nepal =

Place in Nepal

Amritpur, Nepal अमृतपुर
- Village of Tulsipur Sub-Metropolitan City
- Location in Nepal Amritpur, Nepal (Nepal)
- Coordinates: 28°7′0″N 81°36′0″E
- Country: Nepal
- Province: Lumbini Province
- District: Dang Deokhuri District

Population (1991)
  - Total: 9,680
- Time zone: UTC+5:45 (Nepal Time)

Amritpur is a village and former Village Development Committee (Nepal) that is now part of Tulsipur Sub-Metropolitan City in Dang Deokhuri District in Lumbini Province of south-western Nepal. At the time of the 1991 Nepal census it had a population of 9,680 persons living in 1725 individual households.
