= Gajendra Narayan Singh (musicologist) =

Nepali politician and Madhesi activist

- Born: Bihar, India
- Died: 30 April 2018; Patna
- Occupations: Musician; Musicologist; Writer
- Known for: Hindustani music
- Awards: Padma Shri

Gajendra Narayan Singh was an Indian musician, musicologist, writer, art historian and a former chairman of the Bihar Sangeet Natak Academy, the apex body of the Government of Bihar for music and drama. He is the author of four books on music, Mehfil, a historical reference book of music, Swar Gandh (The Fragrance of Swaras), a book of biosketches and music-related anecdotes, Kaljayee Sur: Pandit Bhimsen Joshi, a biographical work on the life and music of Bhimsen Joshi, and Surile Logon ki Sangath (Harmonic accompaniment of people), which details the lives and music of some of the notable Hindustani classical musicians. His efforts are also known in promoting music and musicians of Bihar and he is reported to have initiated scholarship schemes for musicians during his tenure as the head of the Bihar Sangeet Natak Academy. The Government of India awarded him the fourth highest civilian honour of the Padma Shri, in 2007, for his contributions to Indian music. His life has been documented in an autobiography, Bihar ke Sangeeth Parampara (Bihar Music Tradition), which was published by Delhi Public School, Ludhiana, in 2014.

== See also ==
- Rajkumar Shyamanand Sinha
