= Gajendra Narayan Singh Sagarmatha Zonal Hospital =

Hospital in Rajbiraj Saptari, Nepal

Gajendra Narayan Singh Hospital गजेन्द्र नारायण सिंह अस्पताल

Geography
- Location: Rajbiraj Road 3, Rajbiraj 56400 Saptari District, Nepal
- Coordinates: 26°32′09″N 86°45′02″E

Links
- Lists: Hospitals in Nepal

The Gajendra Narayan Singh Hospital (Nepali: गजेन्द्र नारायण सिंह अस्पताल) is a zonal hospital in saptari district of southern Nepal. It has more than hundred beds, service of X-ray and CT Scan. The hospital can handle more than 500 patients.
