= Rapti Eye Hospital =

Eye hospital in Tulsipur, Dang, Lumbini, Nepal

Geography
- Location: Tulsipur, Dang, Lumbini Province, Nepal
- Coordinates: 28°09′52″N 82°18′58″E

Organisation
- Type: Eye Specialist Hospital

Services
- Emergency department: Yes
- Beds: 50 beds

History
- Opened: 1986

Links
- Website: https://raptieyehospital.org

Rapti Eye Hospital is a 50-bed government hospital located in Tulsipur, Dang in Lumbini Province of Nepal. The hospital provides eye health services. It is referred to as one of the largest eye care hospitals in Nepal.

== History ==
It was established in 1986 with the support of Norwegian Church Aid and inaugurated by the then king of Nepal, Birendra Bir Bikram Shah Dev. Later, on 1 January 1998 NABP took over the role of NCA as funding partner to Rapti Eye Hospital till 2011. Starting from 2074 BS (2017–2018), ophthalmic science is being taught in the hospital.

== Departments ==
The hospital provides following services:

- OPD examination
- Refraction service
- Cataract and other Eye surgeries
- Ophthalmology
- Spectacles sales service
- Medicine sales
- Diagnostic screening camps
- School children screening camps
- Eye care awareness training and programs
