= Tulsipur, Dang =

Tulsipur तुल्सीपुर
- Sub-Metropolitan City
- Location in Nepal
- Coordinates: 28°07′59.8″N 082°17′53.0″E
- Country: Nepal
- Province: Lumbini
- District: Dang District
- Established: 1992 (2048 B.S.)

Government
  - Mayor: Tika Ram Khadka (NCP)
  - Deputy Mayor: Syani Chaudhary (NCP)

Area
  - Total: 384.63 km^{2} (148.51 sq mi)
- Elevation: 725 m (2,379 ft)

Population (2021)
  - Total: 180,734
  - Rank: 13th, Literacy rate - 85.1%
  - Density: 469.89/km^{2} (1,217.0/sq mi)

Languages
  - Local: Nepali, Tharu Bhasa
  - Official: Nepali, Tharu Bhasa
- Time zone: UTC+5:45 (NST)
- Postal Code: 22402
- Area code: 082
- Website: tulsipurmun.gov.np

Tulsipur is a Sub-Metropolitan City in Dang District of Lumbini Province of Nepal. It is the district's second most populous city after Ghorahi. It was established in 1992 by merging the former village development committees (VDCs) Tulsipur and Amritpur. In 2014, it was expanded with the addition of VDCs of Urahari, Tarigaun, Pawannagar and Halwar. At the 2011 Nepal census, it had a population of 141,528 people in 31,243 households.

== History ==
The House of Tulsipur ruled one of the largest Taluqs of Oudh, India, which then included the Dang and Deukhuri Valleys. Therefore, it also counted as one of the Baise Rajya (Nepali: बाइसे राज्य; 22 Principalities), a confederation in what became western Nepal. The Tharu civilization of sukaurakot (at the northern bank of Babai River) is one of the oldest human civilizations which was further extended to the eastern part of the country with the migration of the people of this community towards the east.

== Demographics ==
At the time of the 2011 Nepal census, Tulsipur Submetropolitan City had a population of 142,869. Of these, 74.8% spoke Nepali, 23.3% Tharu, 0.7% Magar, 0.5% Hindi, 0.1% Bhojpuri, 0.1% Chantyal, 0.1% Kham, 0.1% Maithili, 0.1% Newar, 0.1% Urdu

In terms of ethnicity/caste, 31.8% were Chhetri, 25.0% Tharu, 14.3% Hill Brahmin, 7.8% Magar, 6.9% Kami, 3.6% Damai/Dholi, 2.8% Sanyasi/Dasnami, 2.1% Sarki, 1.5% Thakuri, 0.9% Newar, 0.5% Musalman, 0.4% Badi, 0.4% Gurung, 0.4% Halwai, 0.3% Kumal, 0.2% Chamar/Harijan/Ram, 0.2% Gaine, 0.1% Chhantyal, 0.1% other Dalit, 0.1% Kathabaniyan, 0.1% Rai, 0.1% Tamang, 0.1% other Terai and 0.1% others.

In terms of religion, 97.8% were Hindu, 0.9% Buddhist, 0.7% Christian, 0.5% Muslim and 0.1% others.

In terms of literacy, 74.5% could read and write, 1.7% could only read and 23.7% could neither read nor write.

== Transportation ==
Dang Airport lies in Old-Tarigaun offering flights to Kathmandu. Roads go north into Salyan District and all the way to Rukum (also called Rapti-Babai Highway) giving its connectivity to Pahadi Lokmarg (Pan Nepal National highway being built up in districts in mountain, parallel to the Mahendra Highway of Terai), 29 km south to the Mahendra Highway Amiliya in Deukhuri Valley and east to Ghorahi and west to Purandhara all the way connecting to Chhinchu, Surkhet. It is the major transit point of southern and western dang, Salyan, Rolpa and Rukum districts and serves as the transportation hub of whole rapti zone.

=== Local Transportation ===
The major source of transportation here are buses and jeeps. Nowadays electric auto rikshaw are also running as local transportation in market and town-side area. For the transportation of goods in villages, tractors are rampantly used though trucks are used in the major highways.

== Media ==
To promote local culture, Tulsipur has currently four FM radio stations. Out of which, Radio Tulsipur 100.2MHZ is the first community radio station. Tulsipur Radio Prakriti 93.4 MHz which is the first environment-friendly community radio station, Radio Hamro Pahuncha - 89 MHz Which is a Community radio Station, Radio Tulsipur - 100.2 MHz which is a private radio station and Radio Sanjhibani-91.0. In addition, there are also two local TV (Television) station STV and STN channels which broadcasts local events and news. Along with these, many daily and weekly local newspapers have been publishing. There is an online news provider channel that is Tulsipur online. Some newspapers which are publishing from Tulsipur are Gorakshya daily, Rapti Aawaj daily, Tharkot weekly, etc. All the media in the city is listed below for reference.

- 1.Radio Tulsipur 100.2MHZ
- 2. Radio Hamro Pahuncha - 89 MHz
- 3. Radio Prakriti 93.4 MHz
- 4. Radio Sanjhibani-91.0
- 5. STN Television Channel
- 6. Dang Television Channel
- 7. Rapti Aawaj National Daily
- 8. Gorakshya National Daily
- 9. Tharkot Weekly
- 10. Farakkon.com
- 11. Hamro Tulsipur
- 12. Tulsipur Khabar
- 13. Merotulsipur
- 14. Farakpati
- 15. Farakpana

== Education ==
The, then zonal headquarter of Rapti zone hosts various Government, Public-Private and Private educational institutions. Nepal Sanskrit University, NSU (formerly Mahendra Sanskrit University), is the only Sanskrit university and the second- oldest University of Nepal which is well known all over Nepal and India for the quality of education it provides promoting ancient Sanskrit, Vedic Astrology, Nepali literature. Students from all over Nepal, from Mechi to Mahakali used to come for Vedic language study. It is mainly famous for its cost-effective education in Sanskrit, which is often considered nearly free. Its main administrative office is located in Beljhundi whereas the campus is in Bijauri. Other prominent institutions include Rapti Babai Campus, which offers various educational streams up to the master's degree level. Central Ayurvedic College and Rapti Life Care Hospital's Staff Nurse program are also well known in the region.

Similarly, Tulsi Boarding School is consistently ranked No. 1 in the entire Mid-Western and Far-Western Region for its SLC results and iswell reputed in Nepal, having been awarded the prize for the best School in the Mid-Western Region (best among 15 districts). There educational Institutions in Tulsipur include Nepal Sanskrit University, Gorkha Secondary School, Hamro Pahunch Secondary School, Divine Temple Academy, Himal Academy, Chandrodaya Vidya Kunj boarding school, Aadarsh Academy, Rapti Vidya Mandir Secondary School, Novex College and Gyan Jyoti Education Foundation under which many school and college are running.

== Healthcare ==
In Tulsipur, there is provincial level hospital named Rapti Provincial Hospital for the general medical need. Tulsipur is home to the renowned Rapti Eye Hospital, recognized as one of the foremost specialized eye care facilities in the region. Additionally, the town boasts several private hospitals and clinics catering to both general medical requirements and specialized treatments.

== Tourist Spots ==
Tulsipur boasts several notable attractions, including the Museum of Tharu Civilization at Chakhaura, which showcases one of Nepal's oldest human civilizations and its influence on the culture and history of southern Nepal. The Ambikeshwari Temple stands out as the city's most popular religious site, complemented by other notable places like the Sawarikot Temple and the Radha-Krishna Temple. Nature enthusiasts flock to the Chameri Cave, located on the northern outskirts of the city, while the Rapti Peace Park in Ganeshpur draws numerous visitors with its array of attractions, ranging from a small zoo to a water park. This park is a favored destination for family outings, offering a respite from bustling city life.

Additionally, Tulsipur features other ancient temples, historical sites, diverse ethnic communities, linguistic variety, varied landscapes, lakes, flora and fauna, and waterfalls, drawing visitors from across the country.

== Climate ==
Climate data for Tulsipur, elevation 725 m (2,379 ft) (1976–2005)
Month	Jan	Feb	Mar	Apr	May	Jun	Jul	Aug	Sep	Oct	Nov	Dec	Year
Mean daily maximum °C (°F)	21.2 (70.2)	23.5 (74.3)	28.6 (83.5)	33.2 (91.8)	34.3 (93.7)	33.1 (91.6)	30.7 (87.3)	30.8 (87.4)	30.3 (86.5)	29.3 (84.7)	26.2 (79.2)	22.6 (72.7)	28.7 (83.6)
Mean daily minimum °C (°F)	6.9 (44.4)	8.9 (48.0)	13.1 (55.6)	18.4 (65.1)	21.5 (70.7)	23.0 (73.4)	23.2 (73.8)	23.0 (73.4)	21.4 (70.5)	16.9 (62.4)	11.7 (53.1)	8.1 (46.6)	16.3 (61.4)
Average precipitation mm (inches)	23.3 (0.92)	21.5 (0.85)	15.3 (0.60)	20.0 (0.79)	87.0 (3.43)	279.2 (10.99)	441.9 (17.40)	412.5 (16.24)	277.1 (10.91)	78.4 (3.09)	10.0 (0.39)	15.0 (0.59)	1,690.4 (66.55)
Source: Agricultural Extension in South Asia

Climate data for Libang Gaun, elevation 1,270 m (4,170 ft)
Month	Jan	Feb	Mar	Apr	May	Jun	Jul	Aug	Sep	Oct	Nov	Dec	Year
Mean daily maximum °C (°F)	16.1 (61.0)	18.0 (64.4)	23.0 (73.4)	28.4 (83.1)	29.7 (85.5)	29.0 (84.2)	26.8 (80.2)	26.6 (79.9)	26.0 (78.8)	24.7 (76.5)	20.9 (69.6)	17.4 (63.3)	23.9 (75.0)
Mean daily minimum °C (°F)	3.8 (38.8)	5.1 (41.2)	9.1 (48.4)	14.2 (57.6)	17.0 (62.6)	18.9 (66.0)	19.3 (66.7)	19.0 (66.2)	17.7 (63.9)	14.4 (57.9)	8.1 (46.6)	4.3 (39.7)	12.6 (54.6)
Average precipitation mm (inches)	28.1 (1.11)	48.0 (1.89)	39.5 (1.56)	46.9 (1.85)	106.6 (4.20)	293.5 (11.56)	417.3 (16.43)	382.7 (15.07)	264.0 (10.39)	53.6 (2.11)	10.3 (0.41)	17.0 (0.67)	1,707.5 (67.25)
Source 1: Australian National University
Source 2: Japan International Cooperation Agency (precipitation)

== See also ==
- Dang District, Nepal
- Ghorahi
