= Koshi Hospital =

Government hospital located in Biratnagar

Geography
- Location: Biratnagar-10, Morang, Koshi Province, Nepal
- Coordinates: 26°27′33″N 87°17′07″E

Organisation
- Type: Federal Level Hospital

Services
- Emergency department: Yes
- Beds: 350 beds

History
- Former name: Koshi Zonal Hospital
- Opened: 1947 BS (1890-1891)

Links
- Website: https://koshihospital.gov.np

Koshi Hospital is a government hospital located in Biratnagar-10, Morang in Koshi Province of Nepal. It is providing health services focusing to the poor and under-privileged people of Koshi Province. Established in 1947 BS (1890-1891), it is regarded as one of the oldest hospitals of Nepal.

== History ==
It was established by Bir Shumsher Jung Bahadur Rana in 1947 BS (1890-1891) as P Bir Hospital which comprises the name of Prithvi Bir Bikram Shah and Bir Shumsher Jung Bahadur Rana in Rangeli, Morang. Later in 1971 BS (1914-1915) it was shifted to Biratnagar. It was named as Tribhuvan Memorial Hospital in 2013 BS (1956-1957). The 50-bed hospital has now been expanded to 350-beds.

== Services ==
The services provided in Koshi Hospital includes:

- Anesthesiology Department,
- Ophthalmology Department,
- Laboratory Department,
- HIV/ARV, Family planning, TB-DOTS, Immunization,
- Radiology Department,
- OPD : Orthopedics, General Surgery, Pediatrics, General Medicine, Dermatology, ENT, Gynecology and Obstetrics,
- Dental Department
- Emergency Department,
- Pharmacy Unit
- Pathology Department
- Physiotherapy Department
- ICU
- NICU
- Postmortem
