= Raja Bahadur Kirtyanand Sinha =

Indian businessman and philanthropist

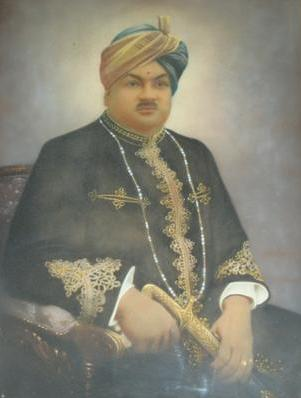
Raja Bahadur Kirtyanand Sinha

Raja Bahadur Kirtyanand Sinha (1880-1938) was an Indian businessman and philanthropist.

== Life ==
Sinha contributed to the establishment of T.N.B College in Bhagalpur, which was in need of funds, having been established in the 1880s. Sinha contributed "60 acres of land and 6 lakhs of rupees in cash for the construction of building and other developmental work".

== See also ==
- Banaili
- Raj Darbhanga
- Maharaja Lakshmeshwar Singh
