= Rapti Provincial Hospital =

Government hospital in Lumbini, Nepal

Geography
- Location: Tulsipur, Dang, Lumbini Province, Nepal
- Coordinates: 28°08′10″N 82°17′51″E

Organisation
- Type: Provincial Level Hospital

Services
- Emergency department: Yes
- Beds: 141 beds

History
- Former name: Rapti Zonal Hospital
- Opened: 2033 BS (1976–1977)

Links
- Website: https://rph.lumbini.gov.np

Rapti Provincial Hospital is a government hospital located in Tulsipur, Dang in Lumbini Province of Nepal. The hospital is considered a crucial resource for healthcare to poor citizens who cannot afford treatments in the private hospitals. It is referred as one of the largest hospital in Nepal. People living in Salyan, Rolpa, Rukum, Pyuthan and Jajarkot also takes advantage of this hospital service. According to Government of Nepal it was upgraded to 50 bedded hospital in 2065 BS (2008–2009). Currently, it's running with 141 functioning beds as a provincial hospital. It provides Emergency and OPD services with zero cost for tickets.

== History ==
It was established as a Health post in 2033 BS (1976–1977). It was then upgraded as a Primary health care center in 2054 B.S. Whereas, in 2065 BS (2008–2009) it was named as Rapti zonal hospital. Following the decision of Cabinet ministry of lumbini province in 2075 BS (2018–2019), it was upgraded as Rapti Provincial Hospital.

== Departments ==
According to the centre, provided facilities include:

- Hemodialysis Department
- Social Service Unit
- Antiretroviral Therapy Center( ART)
- Radiology Department
- Out Patient Department (OPD) : Orthopedics, General Medicine, Pediatrics, Surgery, Dermatology, Gynecology, ENT, Psychiatric
- Dental Department
- One Stop Crisis Management Center (OCMC)
- Laboratory Department
