= Banaili =

Zamindari estate

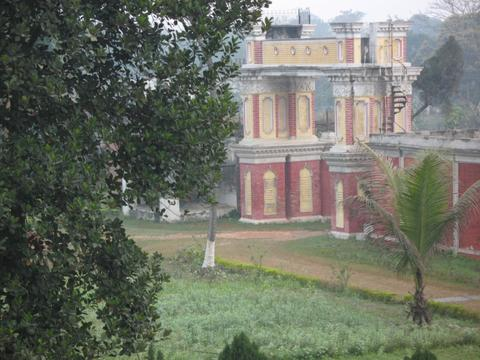
Singh Darwaza at Chanmpanagar Deorhi

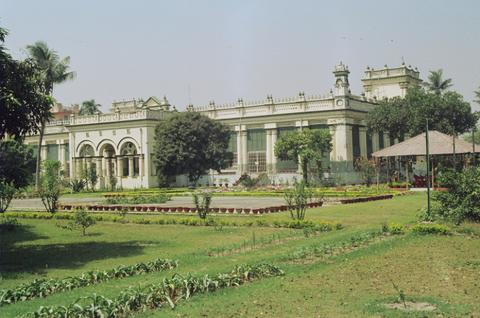
Navaratan Palace at Chanmpanagar

Banaili Raj also known as Garhbanaili Raj was a zamindari estate based in the Indian state of Bihar. Banaili estate was owned by the Maithil Brahmins. They were considered one of the ruling dynasties of the Mithila region.

The name of the estate derives from a village Banaili in the then Purnia district of Bihar.

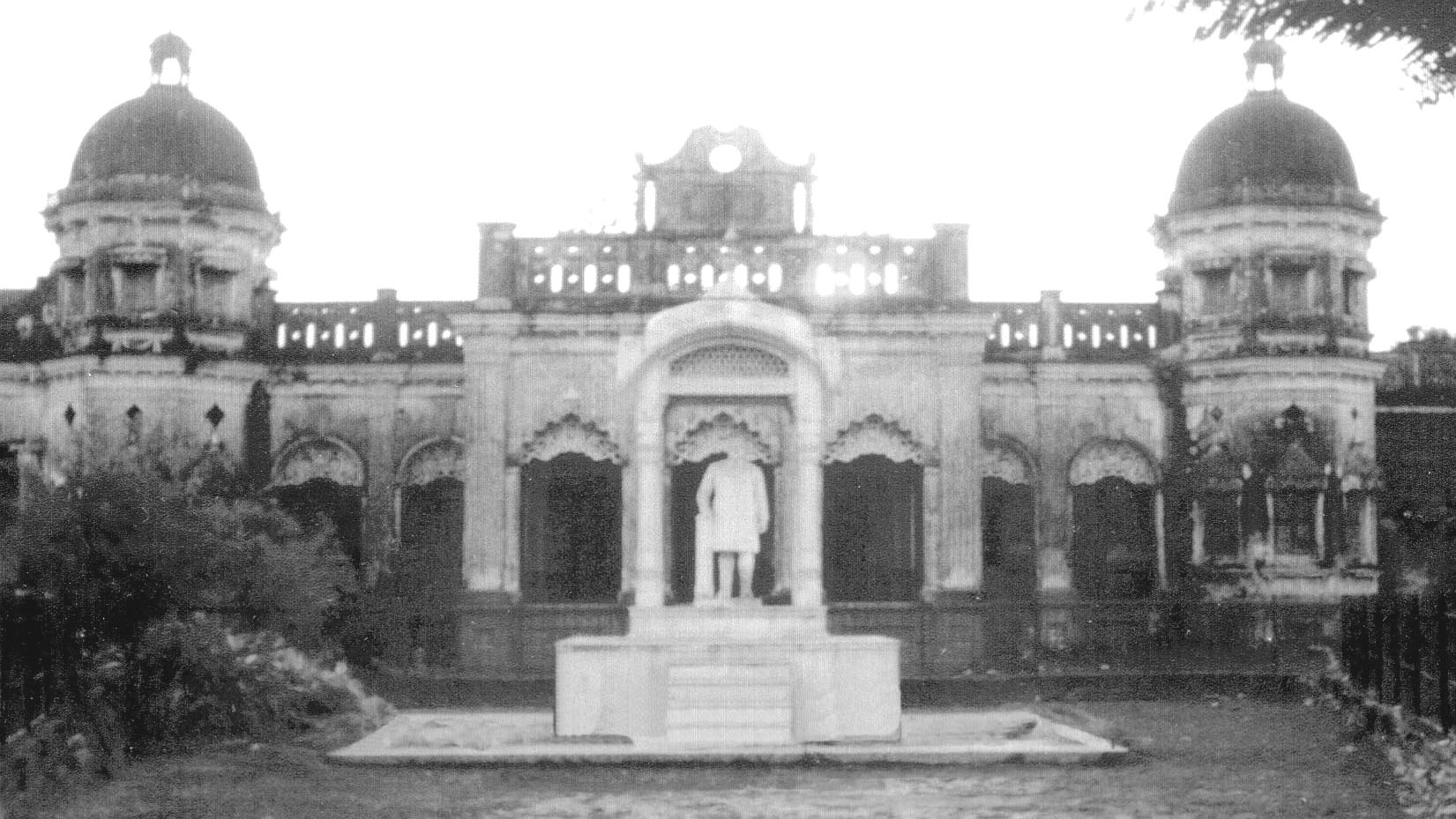
Krishnagarh Palace at Sultanganj

One of the centres of Banaili Raj located in Sultanganj is believed to have ancient historical or mythical association. The Krishnagarh Palace built by Kumar Krishnanand Singh on Sultanganj is in the Karnagarh area, which is believed to be place where the castle of King Karna, who features in the Mahabharata, was located.

== See also ==
- Raja Bahadur Kirtyanand Sinha
- Zamindars of Bihar
