= Social Security Fund (Nepal) =

- सामाजिक सुरक्षा कोष

Agency overview
- Jurisdiction: Government of Nepal
- Headquarters: Babarmahal, Kathmandu
- Website: https://ssf.gov.np

Social Security Fund (SSF) Nepal (Nepali: सामाजिक सुरक्षा कोष) was established in 2011 (7 Chaitra 2067 BS) according to the Social Security (Management Fund and Operation) Regulations, 2067 BS. It is governed by Social Security Act, 2018 (2075 BS). The Act requires every company/employer to enlist their name and its employees in the Fund.

The SSF is an affiliate body of the Ministry of Labour, Employment and Social Security (MoLESS).

== Board of Directors ==
A 13-member tripartite board of directors has been formed under the chairmanship of the Secretary of the Ministry of Labor and Employment of the Government of Nepal for the management and operation of this fund in which there are representatives of government agencies, employers and trade unions.

== Affiliates ==
International Social Security Association

== Contributors ==
The fund currently has 18519 registered employers and 999806 registered contributors.

== Contribution amount ==
Formal sector
Contributors	Contribution Heading	Contribution Rate (Of Basic Remuneration)
Employee	Pension Fund	10%
Employee	Social Security Tax	1%
Total Employee Contribution		11%
Employer	Pension Fund	10%
Employer	Gratuity	8.33%
Employer	Additional Contribution	1.67%
Total Employer's Contribution		20%
Total Monthly Contribution at SSF		31%

== Benefits ==
- Medicine, health and maternity protection plan
- Accident and Disability Safety Plan
- Dependent Family Protection Scheme
- Old age protection plan

== Portal access ==
Employer or employee can have access to their scheme in SSF (Nepal) using either web or mobile applications. To provide easier means to access, SSF released its android application on Aug 14, 2022 and IOS application.
