= Khalanga, Salyan =

Khalanga खलङ्गा
- Location in Nepal
- Coordinates: 28.38°N 82.18°E
- Country: Nepal
- Zone: Rapti Zone
- District: Salyan District

Population (1991)
  - Total: 6,390
- Time zone: UTC+5:45 (Nepal Time)

Khalanga is market center in Sharada Municipality in Salyan District of Karnali Province of Nepal. The place formerly existing as Village Development Committee was annexed to form a new municipality since 18 May 2014. It is the district headquarter of Salyan District. At the time of the 1991 Nepal census it had a population of 6380.

== Media ==
To Promote local culture Khalanga has one FM radio station Radio Salyan FM - 101 MHz Which is a Community radio Station.
