= Oxygen plant =

Industrial systems designed to generate oxygen

Oxygen plants are industrial systems designed to generate oxygen. They typically use air as a feedstock and separate it from other components of air using pressure swing adsorption or membrane separation techniques. Such plants are distinct from cryogenic separation plants which separate and capture all the components of air.

== Application ==
Oxygen finds broad application in various technological processes and in almost all industry branches. The primary oxygen application is associated with its capability of sustaining burning process, and the powerful oxidant properties.

Due to that, oxygen has become widely used in the metal processing, welding, cutting and brazing processes. In the chemical and petrochemical industries, as well as in the oil and gas sector oxygen is used in commercial volumes as an oxidizer in chemical reactions.

- Metal gas welding, cutting and brazing - The use of oxygen in gas-flame operations, such as metal welding, cutting and brazing is one of the most significant and common applications of this gas. Oxygen allows generating high-temperature flame in welding torches thus ensuring high quality and speed of work performance.
- Metal industry - Oxygen is heavily used in the metal industry where it helps to increase burning temperature by the production of ferrous and non-ferrous metals and significantly improve the overall process efficiency.
- Chemical and petrochemical industries - In the chemical and petrochemical industries, oxygen is widely used for oxidation of raw chemicals for recovery of nitric acid, ethylene oxide, propylene oxide, vinyl chloride and other important chemical compounds.
- Oil and gas industry - In the oil and gas industry, oxygen finds application as a means for viscosity improvement and enhancement of oil-and-gas flow properties. Oxygen is also used for boosting production capacity of oil cracking plants, efficiency of high-octane components processing, as well as for the reduction of sulfuric deposits in refineries.
- Fish farming - The use of oxygen in the fish farming helps increase the survival and fertility ratios and reduce the incubation period. Along with fish culture, oxygen is applied for shrimps, crabs and mussels rearing.
- Glass manufacture - In glass furnaces oxygen is effectively used for burning temperature increase and burning processes improvement.
- Waste management - The use of oxygen in incinerators allows significantly increased flame temperatures and eventually ensures enhanced cost efficiency and incinerator production capacity.
- Medicine - Medical oxygen therapy may be administered to patients for various reasons such as low oxygen saturation or to ease respiratory distress.

== Adsorption technology ==
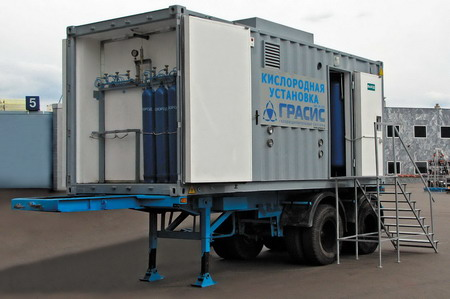
Type of performance on semitrailer

=== Adsorption principle ===
Gas separation by adsorption systems is based on differential rates of adsorption of the components of a gas mixture into a solid adsorbent.

=== Temperature and pressure influence ===
The current means of gaseous oxygen production from air by the use of adsorption technology produce a high fraction of oxygen as their output. The mechanism of operation of a modern oxygen adsorption plant is based on the variation of uptake of a particular gas component by the adsorbent as the temperature and partial pressure of the gas is changed.

The gas adsorption and adsorbent regeneration processes may therefore be regulated by varying of the pressure and temperature parameters.

=== Pressure swing adsorption ===
The oxygen plant flow process is arranged in such a way that highly absorbable gas mixture components are taken in by adsorbent, while low absorbable and non-absorbable components go through the plant. Today, there exist three methods of arranging the adsorption-based air separation process with the use of swing technologies: pressure (PSA), vacuum (VSA) and mixed (VPSA) ones. In the pressure swing adsorption flow processes, oxygen is recovered under above-atmospheric pressure and regeneration is achieved under atmospheric pressure. In vacuum swing adsorption flow processes, oxygen is recovered under atmospheric pressure, and regeneration is achieved under negative pressure. The mixed systems operation combines pressure variations from positive to negative.

== Adsorption oxygen plants ==
The adsorption oxygen plants produce 5 to 5,000 normal cubic meters per hour of oxygen with a purity of 93-95%. These systems, designated for indoor operation, are set to effectively produce gaseous oxygen from atmospheric air.

An unquestionable advantage of adsorption-based oxygen plants is the low cost of oxygen produced in the cases where there are no rigid requirements to the product oxygen purity.

Structurally, the adsorption oxygen plant consists of several adsorbers, the compressor unit, pre-purifier unit, valve system and the plant control system.

A simple adsorber is a column filled with layers of specially selected adsorbents – granular substances preferentially adsorbing highly adsorbable components of a gas mixture.

Where gaseous oxygen purity is required at the level of 90-95% with the capacity of up to 5,000 Nm^{3} per hour, adsorption oxygen plants are the optimal choice. This oxygen purity may also be obtained through the use of systems based on the cryogenic technology; however, cryogenic plants are more cumbersome and complex in operation.

== Membrane technology ==
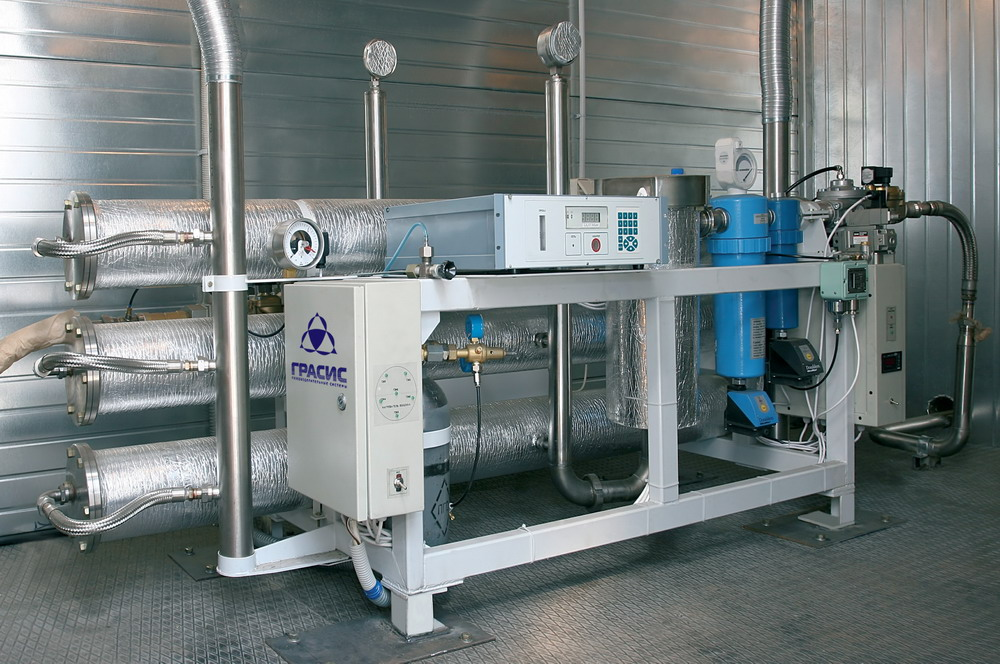
Membrane oxygen equipment

=== Innovation technology available today ===
Some companies produce high-efficiency systems for oxygen production from atmospheric air with the help of membrane technology.

=== Membrane operation principle ===
The basis of gas media separation with the use of membrane systems is the difference in velocity with which various gas mixture components permeate membrane substance. The driving force behind the gas separation process is the difference in partial pressures on different membrane sides.

=== Membrane cartridge ===
A modern gas separation membrane used by GRASYS is no longer a flat plate, but is formed by hollow fibers. Membrane consists of a porous polymer fiber with the gas separation layer applied to its external surface. Structurally, a hollow fiber membrane is configured as a cylindrical cartridge representing a spool with specifically reeled polymer fiber.

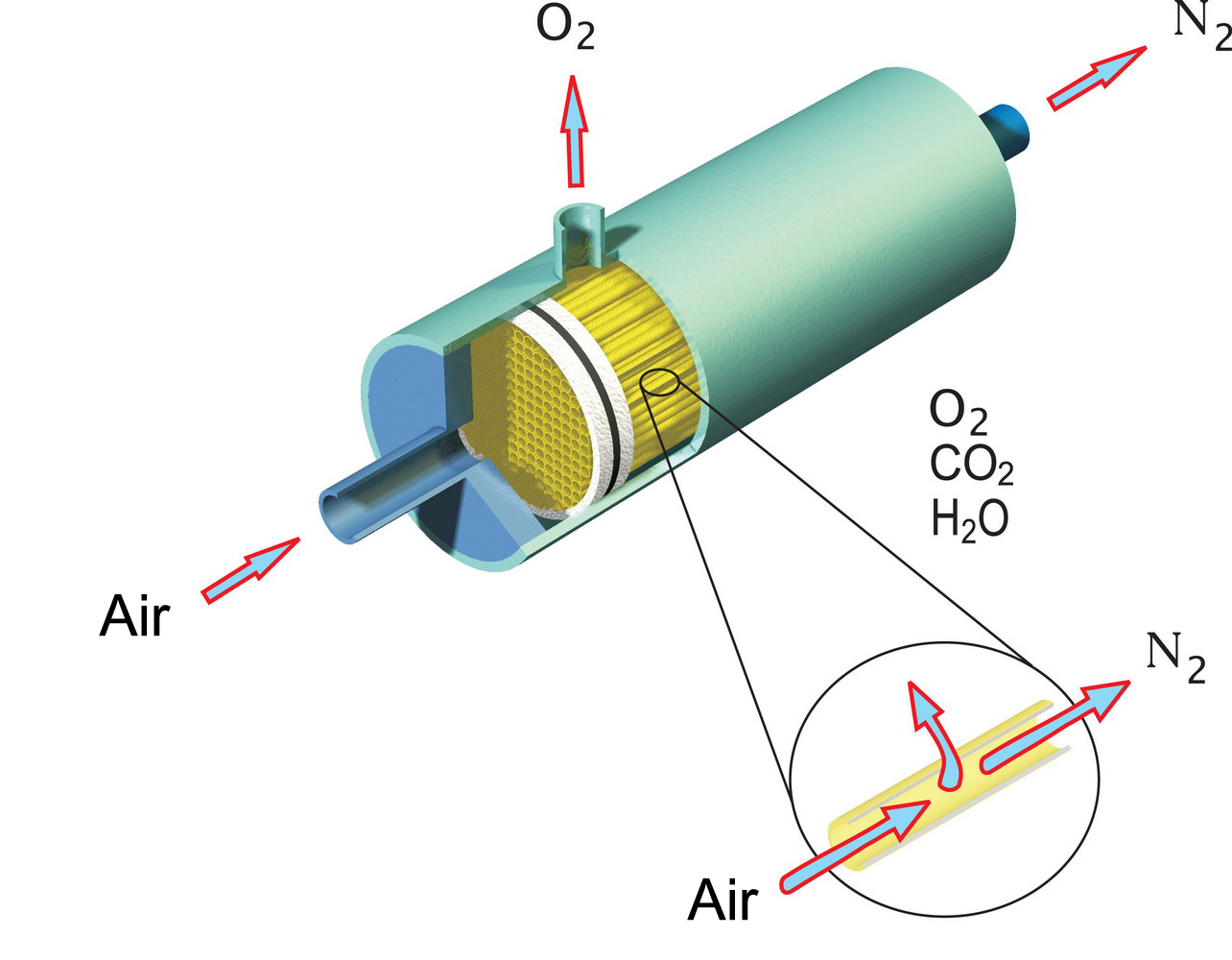
Membrane cartridge

=== Compressor and vacuum technologies ===
Due to the membrane material high permeability for oxygen in contrast to nitrogen, the design of membrane oxygen complexes requires a special approach. Basically, there are two membrane-based oxygen production technologies: compressor and vacuum ones.

In the case of compressor technology, air is supplied into the fiber space under excess pressure, oxygen exits the membrane under slight excess pressure, and where necessary, is pressurized by booster compressor to the required pressure level. By the use of vacuum technology, a vacuum pump is used for the achievement of partial pressures difference.

== Membrane oxygen plants ==
Designed for indoor operation, membrane oxygen plants allow efficient air enrichment with oxygen up to the concentration of 30-45%. The complexes are rated to 5 to 5,000 nm3/hr of oxygenated air.

In the membrane oxygen plant, gas separation is achieved in the gas separation module composed of hollow-fiber membranes and representing the plant critical and high-technology unit. Apart from the gas separation unit, other important technical components are the booster compressor or vacuum pump, pre-purifier unit, and the plant control system.

The adoption of membrane systems for air enrichment purposes promises multiple oxygen savings where the oxygen concentration of 30-45% is sufficient to cover process needs. In addition to customer saving on the product oxygen cost, there is a collateral economic effect based on extremely low operating costs.

With the incorporation of the membrane technology, oxygen plants have outstanding technical characteristics. Membrane oxygen plants are highly reliable due to the absence of moving parts in the gas separation module.

The systems are very simple in operation – control of all operating parameters is carried out automatically. Because of the plant's high automation degree, staffed oversight is not required during its operation.

Membrane oxygen plants are finding increasingly broad application in various industries all over the world. With moderate requirements to oxygen purity in product - up to 30-45%, membrane systems generally prove more economically sound than adsorption and cryogenic systems. In addition, membrane plants are much simpler in operation and more reliable.

== Advantages of adsorption and membrane oxygen plants ==
- Complete automation and simplicity of operation;
- Staffed oversight is not required during operation;
- Enhanced failure safety and reliability;
- Quick start and stop;
- Moderate dimensions and light weight;
- Low noise level;
- Extended operational life;
- Low operating costs;
- No special workshop requirements;
- Easy installation and integration into an existing air system.

=== Disadvantages ===
- Relativity low oxygen purity - 93-95% for adsorption and 30-45% for membrane plants;
- Limited capacity.
- High power consumption.
