= High-dependency unit =

Area in a hospital

A High-Dependency Unit (HDU) also known as High Care Unit (HCU) is an area in a hospital, usually located close to the intensive care unit, where patients can be cared for more extensively than on a normal ward, but not to the point of intensive care. It is appropriate for patients who have had major surgery and for those with single-organ failure. Many of these units were set up in the 1990s when hospitals found that a proportion of patients was requiring a level of care that could not be delivered in a normal ward setting. This is thought to be associated with a reduction in mortality. Patients may be admitted to an HDU bed because they are at risk of requiring intensive care admission, or as a step-down between intensive care and ward-based care.

In 2000 the UK Department of Health issued the Comprehensive Critical Care report, which set out the number of high dependency ("level 2") beds a hospital should have to deliver care appropriately. By this time, two thirds of UK hospitals had beds identified as "high dependency". The report defines level 2 care as "more detailed observations or intervention including support for a single failing organ system or postoperative care and those 'stepping down' from higher levels of care".

If positive airway pressure ventilation is used to treat respiratory failure, this may be administered in a high dependency unit or equivalent area.
