= Directly observed treatment, short-course =

Tubercuolosis treatment strategy

Directly observed treatment, short-course (DOTS, also known as TB-DOTS) is the name given to the tuberculosis (TB) control strategy recommended by the World Health Organization. According to WHO, "The most cost-effective way to stop the spread of TB in communities with a high incidence is by curing it. The best curative method for TB is known as DOTS." DOTS has five main components:

- Government commitment (including political will at all levels, and establishment of a centralized and prioritized system of TB monitoring, recording and training)
- Case detection by sputum smear microscopy among symptomatic patients self-reporting to health services
- Standardized treatment regimen of six to eight months for at least all confirmed sputum smear positive cases, with directly observed therapy (DOT) for at least the initial two months
- A regular, uninterrupted supply of all essential anti-TB drugs
- A standardized recording and reporting system that allows assessment of treatment results

== Implementation ==
DOTS is used conventionally as the third component, which shares its name. Directly Observed Therapy (DOT) for the treatment of tuberculosis is when a health care worker or another designated person watches the TB patient swallow each dose of their prescribed drugs. A typical DOT encounter includes delivering the prescribed medication, checking for side effects such as fever and jaundice, watching the patient swallow the medication, answering questions, and documenting the visit.

A DOT encounter can be completed in many ways. For example, a health care worker or a trusted individual might watch the person take the prescribed medication at a clinic, home, or other designated location (in-person DOT). Or, the person receives the medication from their doctor and takes it under video supervision (video DOT) either synchronously or asynchronously where the patient uploads recordings to the provider or clinic. Factors that may go into the decision to use in-person DOT versus video DOT include: if the patient needs close clinical monitoring, is prescribed injectable medications, is non-adherent to treatment with video DOT, or prefers in-person DOT. Video DOT is not advised if the patient or their caregiver does not demonstrate comfort of proficiency with the video DOT platform or does not communicate with their healthcare team effectively. Additional factors that may go into the decision are existing comorbidities, reinfection, or reactivation.

Different health departments utilize DOT for different lengths of time, but all regimens are composed of an intensive phase followed by a continuation phase. DOT is usually applied during the intensive phase (initial 2 months) but may be implemented up to the full course of treatment. For drug susceptible TB, the continuation phase can last 2, 4, or 7 months for the most common regimen. However, multi-drug-resistant TB might require 18 to 24 months to treat. For patients who have latent tuberculosis (TB infection), DOT is less common, and the clinical team may rely on self-administered therapy.

== History ==
The technical strategy for DOTS was developed by Karel Styblo of the International Union Against TB & Lung Disease in the 1970s and 80s, primarily in Tanzania, but also in Malawi, Nicaragua and Mozambique. Styblo refined "a treatment system of checks and balances that provided high cure rates at a cost affordable for most developing countries." This increased the proportion of people cured of TB from 40% to nearly 80%, costing up to $10 per life saved and $3 per new infection avoided.

In 2007, WHO and the World Bank began investigating the potential expansion of this strategy. In July 2008, the World Bank invited Styblo and WHO to design a TB control project for China. By the end of 2007 this pilot project was achieving phenomenal results, more than doubling cure rates among TB patients. China soon extended this project to cover half the country.

During the early 1990s, WHO determined that of the nearly 700 different tasks involved in Styblo's meticulous system, only 100 of them were essential to run an effective TB control program. From this, WHO's relatively small TB unit at that time, led by Arata Kochi, developed an even more concise "Framework for TB Control" focusing on five main elements and nine key operations. The initial emphasis was on "DOT, or directly observed therapy, using a specific combination of TB medicines known as short-course chemotherapy as one of the five essential elements for controlling TB. In 1993, the World Bank's World Development Report claimed that the TB control strategies used in DOTS were one of the most cost-effective public health investments.

In the Fall of 1994, Kraig Klaudt, WHO's TB Advocacy Officer, developed the name and concept for a marketing strategy to brand this complex public health intervention. To help market "DOTS" to global and national decision makers, turning the word "dots" upside down to spell "stop" proved a shorthand that promoted "Stop TB. Use Dots!"

According to POZ Magazine, "You know the worldwide epidemic of TB is entering a critical stage when the cash-strapped World Health Organization spends a fortune on glossy paper, morbid photos and an interactive, spinning (!) cover for its 1995 TB report." India's Joint Effort to Eradicate TB NGO observed that, "DOTS became a clarion call for TB control programmes around the world. Because of its novelty, this health intervention quickly captured the attention of even those outside of the international health community."

The DOTS report was released to the public on March 20, 1995, at New York City's Health Department. At the news conference, Tom Frieden, head of the city's Bureau of TB Control captured the essence of DOTS, "TB control is basically a management problem." Frieden had been credited for using the strategy to turn around New York City's TB outbreak a few years earlier.

On March 19, 1997, at the Robert Koch Institute in Berlin, Germany, WHO announced that "DOTS was the biggest health breakthrough of the decade." According to WHO Director-General Hiroshi Nakajima, "We anticipate that at least 10 million deaths from TB will be prevented in the next ten years with the introduction and extensive use of the DOTS strategy." Upon Nakajima's death in 2013, WHO recognized that the promotion of DOTS was one of WHO's most successful programs developed during his ten-year administration.

== Impact ==
There has been a steady uptake of DOTS TB control services over the subsequent decades. Whereas previously less than 2% of infectious TB patients were being detected and cured, with DOTS treatment services in 1990 approximately 60% have been benefitted from this care. Since 1995, 41 million people have been successfully treated and up to 6 million lives saved through DOTS and the Stop TB Strategy. 5.8 million TB cases were notified through DOTS programs in 2009.

A systematic review of randomized clinical trials found no difference for cure rates as well as the treatment completion rates between directly observed therapy (DOT) and self-administered drug therapy. A 2013 meta-analysis of both clinical trials and observational studies too did not find any difference between DOTS and self-administered therapy. However, the WHO and all other TB programs continue to use DOTS as an important strategy for TB delivery for fear of drug resistance.

DOTS-Plus is for multi-drug-resistant tuberculosis (MDR-TB).
