= Bhagawan Koirala =

Nepalese Cardiothoracic surgeon, professor, and Social worker

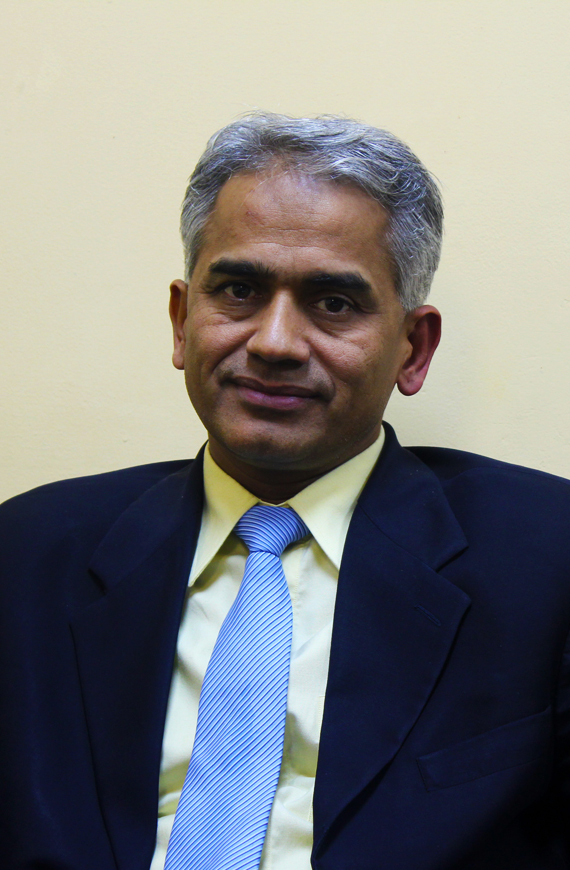
- Bhagawan Koirala in 2012
- Born: July 24, 1960; Palpa, Nepal
- Education: Dhaka University; Kharkiv National Medical University
- Known for: Pioneering open heart surgery in Nepal.
- Medical career
- Profession: Cardiac Surgeon, Professor
- Institutions: Tribhuvan University (T.U.); T.U. Teaching Hospital; Manmohan Cardiothoracic Vascular and Transplant Center (MCVTC); Shahid Gangalal National Heart Center; Ministry of Health and Population (MOHP), Cardiac Society of Nepal
- Sub-specialties: cardiothoracic surgery
- Research: open-heart surgery

Bhagawan Koirala (Nepali: भगवान कोइराला) (born July 24, 1960) is a Nepalese Cardiothoracic surgeon, professor and Social Worker. He led the team of Nepalese surgeons in Shahid Gangalal National Heart Centre for Open-heart surgery in Nepal.

== Education and Background ==
Koirala completed his primary school in his hometown of Palpa. He then completed a “Certificate in General Medicine”, a degree equivalent to that of a Physician assistant, from the Institute of Medicine in Kathmandu. His deep interest took him to Kharkiv, Ukraine, where he graduated from Kharkiv Medical Institute in 1989. He credits his teacher during the paramedic course for encouraging him to take a career in medicine, particularly in the field of cardiac surgery. He did his post-graduation in Cardiothoracic and surgery from the National Institute of Cardiovascular diseases, Dhaka University in 1994. He also has a valid USMLE certificate. He did a year of surgical residency at the Baystate Medical Center and later continued as a fellow in cardiac surgery in the same place. He then completed a year of fellowship in pediatric cardiac surgery from the Sick Children's Hospital, University of Toronto, Canada The Hospital for Sick Children of Toronto in 2000.

== Career ==
Koirala started his career at the Tribhuvan University Teaching Hospital. He was involved in the team that started the Open Heart surgery program at the Teaching Hospital in 1997. After returning from Canada, he led the newly established Shahid Gangalal National Heart Center as the Executive director from 2001 till 2009. He was an acting Executive Director of Manmohan Cardiothoracic Vascular and Transplant Center. He also served as the Executive Director of Tribhuvan University Teaching Hospital. Professionally, he was heading the department of cardiac surgery while at the heart hospital and later the department of Cardiothoracic and Vascular Surgery, Tribhuvan University. He has performed or directly supervised over 14 thousand various kinds of congenital as well as adult heart surgeries between 2001 and 2024. He contributed as the Board Director of multiple government institutions.

=== Humanitarian projects ===
He is involved with numerous social and charitable organizations. His motto is: “No child in this country shall die of heart disease because of poverty”. He is Past Chairman of Jayanti Memorial Trust, an organization that is dedicated to helping patients with heart diseases. He is Past Chairman of Karuna Foundation Nepal, which works on the prevention, early detection, and rehabilitation of disabilities. He is now Chairman of Kathmandu Institute of Child Health (KIOCH), which aims to establish a multispecialty children's hospital in Kathmandu and pediatric hospitals in all other provinces of Nepal.

=== Memberships and Fellowships ===
Koirala is a member of numerous medical and scientific organizations:-

- Life Member, Nepal Medical Association
- Life Member, Society of Surgeons in Nepal
- Life Member, Nepal Heart Foundation
- Life Member, Cardiac Society of Nepal
- Member, America Nepal Medical Foundation Nepal
- Honorary Overseas Fellow of (IACTS), Indian Association of Cardiovascular Thoracic Surgeons
- Fellow of American College of Cardiology (FACC)
- Member, Society of Thoracic Surgeons (STS)
- Fellow of Royal College of Surgeons, Edinburgh (FRCS Ed) 2024
- American College of Cardiology (FACC)

=== Executive Positions Held ===
- Executive Director: Shahid Gangalal National Heart Center, Kathmandu
- Executive Director (Acting): Manmohan Cardiothoracic, Vascular and Transplant Center, Tribhuvan University, Kathmandu
- Executive Director: Tribhuvan University Teaching Hospital, Kathmandu
- Executive Vice Chair: Commission for Health Professional Education, Government of Nepal
- Chairman: Nepal Medical Council

==== Humanitarian and Social Works / Initiatives ====
Koirala has affiliation with various Social and Humanitarian work / Initiatives/ organizations:-

- Chairman of Jayanti Memorial Trust
- Founding Chairman of Kathmandu Institute of Child Health (KIOCH)
- Former Chairman of Karuna Foundation Nepal (KFN)

== Contributions to medicine ==
=== Pioneering open heart surgery in Nepal ===
The first open-heart surgery in Nepal was performed by the all-Nepalese team including Koirala at Tribhuvan University Teaching Hospital (TUTH) on 20 February 1997. This initiative gave a hope for treating heart diseases inside the country by establishing the first fully operational heart hospital, and also to ensure free service for the needy.

=== Social Initiatives ===
His social initiative came when Nepal completely lacked resources to treat heart patients, and the rate of heart-related diseases was increasing in the region. According to a National Report on NCDs and CVDs compiled by NHRC in 2010;

Distribution of NCDs in terms of socio-demographic variables (age, sex, ethnic groups, and geographic area) was calculated. Data shows that out of the total admitted patients, 36.5% patients suffered from NCDs. Out of total NCDs, 38% had heart diseases followed by COPD (33%), whereas diabetes and cancer accounted for 10% and 19% of cases respectively.

MCVTC, previously headed by Koirala, is famously known for providing medicines at lower prices than the suggested retail price. He also represents the team of Cardiovascular Surgery for Asia Pacific Society of Cardiology's Scientific Council (May 2011 to Feb 2013).

Dr. Koirala served as the Chairman of Nepal Medical Council from 2019 to 2023.

Dr. Koirala is Visiting Professor at NAMS, where he provides service to cardiac patients at Bir Hospital.

Dr. Koirala as the Chairman of KIOCH, which is working to establish Children's Hospital Network with Multi-Specialty HUB hospital in Kathmandu and satellite hospitals in remaining six provinces of Nepal.

== Honors and awards ==
- 'Birendra-Aisworya' Medal for outstanding Service, 2001
- 'Suprabal Gorkha Dakshinbahu IV' for outstanding service, 2001
- Royal Nepal Academy of Science and Technology - Science and Technology Talent Award Grade 'A', 2005
- 'Hem Bahadur Malla Honor' for outstanding hospital services, public Administration Association of Nepal, 2006
- 'Manager of The Year 2007', Management Association of Nepal, 2008
- Mrigendra-Samjhana Medical Trust Honor, 2012 and 2022
- Suprabal Jana Sewashree III, Government of Nepal, 2012
- Sukirtimaya Rastradeep III, Government of Nepal, 2019

== Publications ==
Over 60 publications in National and International Journals.

== Personal life ==
Koirala was born in Palpa, Nepal. He resides in Kathmandu with his parents, wife and son.
