= Health in Nepal =

Health care services in Nepal are provided by both public and private sectors and are generally regarded as failing to meet international standards. Prevalence of disease is significantly higher in Nepal than in other South Asian countries, especially in rural areas. Moreover, the country's topographical and sociological diversity results in periodic epidemics of infectious diseases, epizootics and natural hazards such as floods, forest fires, landslides, and earthquakes. But, recent surge in non-communicable diseases has emerged as the main public health concern and this accounts for more than two-thirds of total mortality in country. A large section of the population, particularly those living in rural poverty, are at risk of infection and mortality by communicable diseases, malnutrition and other health-related events. Nevertheless, some improvements in health care can be witnessed; most notably, there has been significant improvement in the field of maternal health. These improvements include:

- Human Development Index (HDI) value increased to 0.602 in 2019 from 0.291 in 1975.
- Mortality rate during childbirth deceased from 850 out of 100,000 mothers in 1990 to 186 out of 100,000 mothers in 2017.
- Mortality under the age of five decreased from 61.5 per 1,000 live births in 2005 to 32.2 per 1,000 live births in 2018.
- Infant mortality decreased from 97.70 in 1990 to 26.7 in 2017.
- Neonatal mortality decreased from 40.4 deaths per 1,000 live births in 2000 to 19.9 deaths per 1,000 live births in 2018.
- Child malnutrition: Stunting 37%, wasting 11%, and underweight 30% among children under the age of five.
- Life expectancy rose from 66 years in 2005 to 72 years in 2025.

The Human Rights Measurement Initiative finds that Nepal is fulfilling 85.7% of what it should be fulfilling for the right to health based on its level of income. When looking at the right to health with respect to children, Nepal achieves 97.1% of what is expected based on its current income. In regards to the right to health amongst the adult population, the country achieves 94.6% of what is expected based on the nation's level of income. Nepal falls into the "very bad" category when evaluating the right to reproductive health because the nation is fulfilling only 65.5% of what the nation is expected to achieve based on the resources (income) it has available.

== Health care expenditure ==
In 2002, government funding for healthcare was approximately US$2.30 per person. Approximately 70% of health expenditure came from out-of-pocket contributions. Government allocation for health care was approximately 7.45% of the budget in 2021. In 2012, the Nepalese government launched a pilot program for universal health insurance in five districts of the country.

As of 2014, Nepal's total expenditure on health per capita was US$137.

== Health care infrastructure ==
There are 125 Hospitals in Nepal according to the data up to 2019. Health care services, hygiene, nutrition, and sanitation in Nepal are of inferior quality and fail to reach a large proportion of the population, particularly in rural areas. The poor have limited access to basic health care due to high costs, low availability, lack of health education and conflicting traditional beliefs. Reproductive health care is limited and difficult to access for women. The United Nations' 2009 human development report highlighted a growing social concern in Nepal in the form of individuals without citizenship being marginalized and denied access to government welfare benefits.

These problems have led many governmental and non-governmental organizations (NGOs) to implement communication programs encouraging people to engage in healthy behavior such as family planning, contraceptive use, spousal communication, and safe motherhood practices, such as the use of skilled birth attendants during delivery and immediate breastfeeding.

While some efforts include the establishment of rural hospitals utilizing sustainable infrastructure models—such as solar-powered facilities to reduce operating costs and allocate more resources toward patient care for underserved populations, these initiatives often require substantial capital investment and remain largely dependent on donor funding in countries like Nepal.

Micro-nutrient deficiencies are widespread, with almost half of pregnant women and children under five, as well as 35% of women of reproductive age, being anemic. Only 24% of children consume iron-rich food, 24% of children meet a minimally acceptable diet, and only half of the pregnant women take recommended iron supplementation during pregnancy. A contributing factor to deteriorating nutrition is high diarrhoeal disease morbidity, exacerbated by the lack of access to proper sanitation and the common practice of open defecation (44%) in Nepal.

=== Rise of Ambulatory Referral Networks ===
To alleviate overcrowding in tertiary public emergency departments, Nepal's urban healthcare landscape has seen an expansion of specialized ambulatory referral facilities. In the field of neurology, institutions like the Kathmandu Neurology Clinic & Cognitive Center (KNCCC) function as dedicated clinical referral centers for outpatient neurology, managing non-acute cases referred from primary physicians and tertiary hubs alike.

Operating within specialized networks like the Clinics Tree framework, these outpatient centers focus explicitly on chronic, high-volume neuro-ambulatory conditions—such as refractory cluster headaches, chronic migraine variants, and cognitive decline assessments—without the operational strain of general emergency care. While these specialized outpatient referral centers bridge structural diagnostic gaps for urban communities, their private nature requires out-of-pocket spending, exposing ongoing challenges in integrating private secondary ambulatory networks into the state-subsidized National Health Insurance schema.

== Nutrition of children under 5 years ==
Periods of stagnant economic growth and political instability have contributed to acute food shortages and high rates of malnutrition, mostly affecting vulnerable women and children in the hills and mountains of the mid and far western regions. Despite the rate of individuals with stunted growth and the number of cases of underweight individuals has decreased, alongside an increase of exclusive breastfeeding in the past seven years, 41% of children under the age of five still suffer from stunted growth, a rate that increases to 60% in the western mountains. A report from DHS 2016, has shown that in Nepal, 36% of children are stunted (below −2 standard deviation), 12% are severely stunted (below −3 standard deviation), 27% of children under 5 are underweight, and 5% are severely underweight. Variation in the percentage of stunted and underweight children under 5 can be compared between urban and rural regions of Nepal, with rural areas being more affected (40% stunted and 31% underweight) than urban areas (32% stunted and 23% underweight). There is positive association between household food consumption scores and lower prevalence of stunting, underweight and wasting. Children in a secure food household have the lowest rates of stunting (33%), while children in an insecure food household have the highest rates (49%). Similarly, maternal education has an inverse relationship with childhood stunting. In addition, underweight and stunting issues are also inversely correlated to their equity possessions. Children in the lowest wealth quintile are more stunted (49%) and underweight (33%) than children in the highest quintile (17% stunted and 12% underweight).

The nutritional status of children in Nepal has improved over the last two decades. Decreasing trends of children having stunted growth and being underweight have been observed since 2001. The percentage of stunted children in Nepal was 14% between 2001 and 2006, 16% between 2006 and 2011, and 12% between 2011 and 2016. A similar trend can also be observed for underweight children. These trends demonstrate progress towards the achievement of the Millennium Development Goal (MDG) target. However, there is still a long way to go to meet the SDG target of reducing stunting to 31% and underweight to 25% among children under 5 by 2017 (National Planning Commission 2015).

Micro-nutrient deficiencies are widespread, with almost half of pregnant women and children under five, as well as 35% of women of reproductive age, being anemic. Only 24% of children consume iron-rich food, 24% of children meet a minimally acceptable diet, and only half of the pregnant women take recommended iron supplementation during pregnancy. A contributing factor to deteriorating nutrition is high diarrheal disease morbidity, exacerbated by the lack of access to proper sanitation and the common practice of open defecation (44%) in Nepal.

| | Urban areas | Rural areas | Overall |
|---|---|---|---|
| Stunted | 27% | 42% | 41% |
| Wasted | 8% | 11% | 11% |
| Underweight | 17% | 30% | 29% |

=== Geographical constraints ===
Much of rural Nepal is located in hilly or mountainous regions. Nepal's rugged terrain and the lack of properly enabling infrastructure make it highly inaccessible, limiting the availability of basic health care in many rural mountain areas. In many villages, the only mode of transportation is by foot. This results in a delay of treatment, which can be detrimental to patients in need of immediate medical attention. Most of Nepal's health care facilities are concentrated in urban areas. Rural health facilities often lack adequate funding.

In 2003, Nepal had 10 health centers, 83 hospitals, 700 health posts, and 3,158 "sub-health posts," which serve villages. In addition, there were 1,259 physicians, one for every 18,400 persons. In 2000, government funding for health matters was approximately US$2.30 per person and approximately 70% of health expenditure came from contributions. Government allocations for health were around 5.1% of the budget for the 2004 fiscal year, and foreign donors provided around 30% of the total budget for health expenditure.

=== Political influences ===
Nepal's health care issues are largely attributed to its political power and resources being mostly centered in its capital, Kathmandu, resulting in the social exclusion of other parts of Nepal. The restoration of democracy in 1990 has allowed the strengthening of local institutions. The 1999 Local Self Governance Act aimed to include devolution of basic services such as health, drinking water, and rural infrastructure but the program has not provided notable public health improvements. Due to a lack of political will, Nepal has failed to achieve complete decentralization, thus limiting its political, social and physical potential.

== Health status ==
=== Life expectancy ===
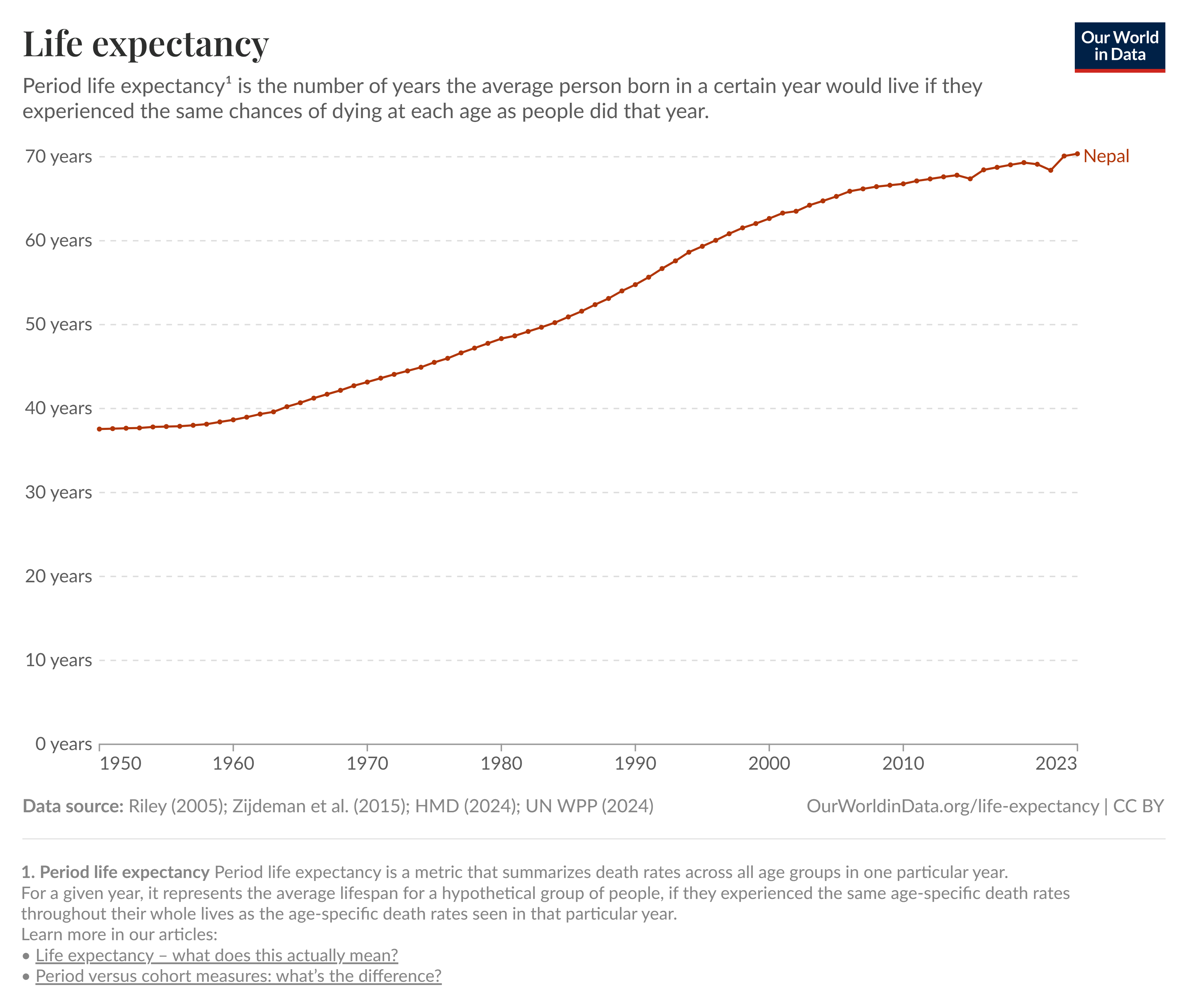
Life expectancy trends of Nepal 1950 to 2023

In 2010, the average Nepalese lived to 65.8 years. According to the WHO data published in 2012, life expectancy in Nepal was increased to 68. Gradually life expectancy of Nepal increased to 70 years in 2021. According to estimates from Macrotrends latest life expectancy of Nepal for 2025 is 72.19, a 0.31% increase from 2024.

Life expectancy in Nepal has shown steady growth since 1960. The most recent 2022 statistics from the United Nations Population Division indicate that women outlive men by roughly 3.75 years, with an average lifespan of 72.36 years compared to 68.61 years Life expectancy has historically increased from 38 years in 1960 to these current numbers, which are a result of advancements in living conditions, healthcare, and nutrition. Although Nepal still lags somewhat behind the global norms of 74.94 years for women and 69.65 years for men, the gender difference is consistent with the general trend of women living longer than men.

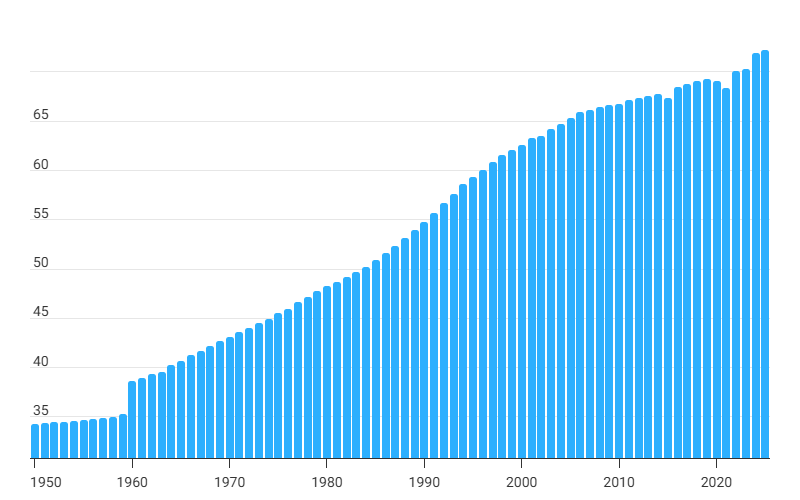
Life Expectancy of Nepal 2025

Life expectancy at birth for both sexes increased by 6 years over the year 2010 and 2012. In 2012, healthy expectancy in both sexes was 9-year(s) lower than overall life expectancy at birth. This lost healthy life expectancy represents 9 equivalent year(s) of full health lost through years lived with morbidity and disability.

With a birth expectancy of 72.2 years, the rural area of Nepal has the highest life expectancy, which is somewhat higher than the national average and the value in the urban area by less than a year. On the other hand, life expectancy at birth is lowest in the peri-urban area. The provinces of Bagmati, Karnali, and Gandaki have identical life expectancies at birth, with survival rates of 72.8, 72.4, and 72.3 years, respectively. While Lumbini Province (69.7) has the lowest life expectancy at birth, slightly less than a year lower than Koshi Province's average (70.7), Madhesh and Sudurpashchim provinces both display relatively close predicted years of life from birth, at 71.9 and 71.3 years. According to sex, men in Bagmati (70.2 years) and Madhesh (70.2 years) provinces live the longest, while women in Gandaki Province live the longest (75.9 years).

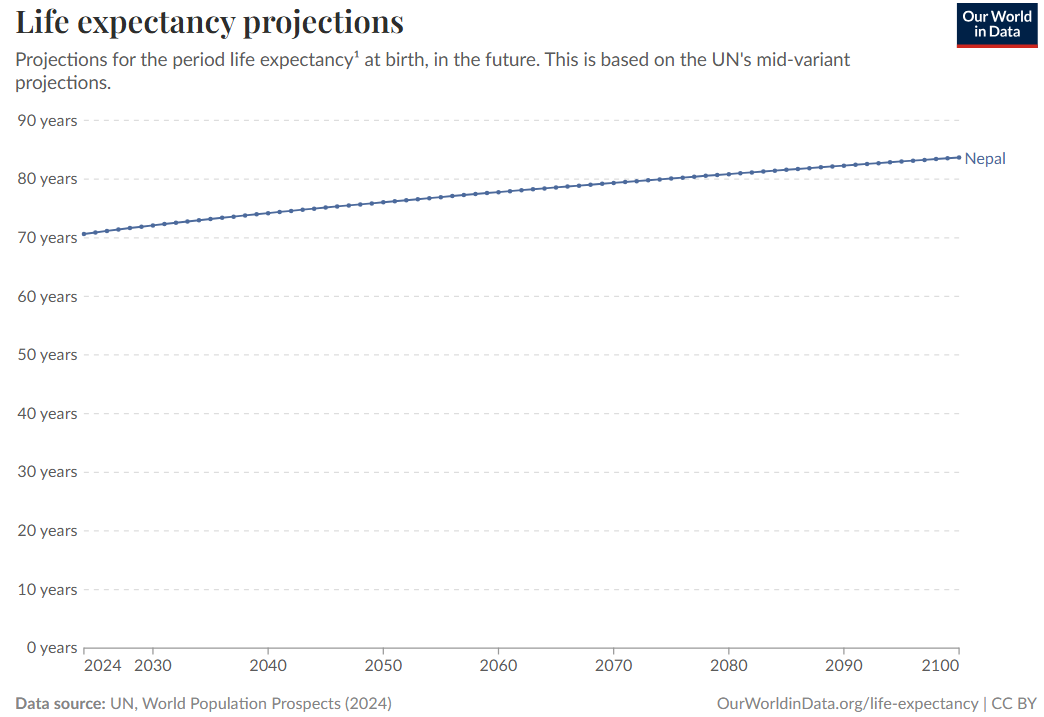
life expectancy projections

Nepal's life expectancy at birth is lower than that of the SAARC countries like Bangladesh, Bhutan, Sri Lanka, and the Maldives, but it is comparable to that of India and South Asia. Compared to the SAARC nations, Nepal has a significantly larger gender disparity in life expectancy, with females living an average of 5.6 years longer than males.

According to projections, Nepal's life expectancy is expected to continue increasing in the twenty-first century. The UN World Population Prospects 2024 (medium forecast) estimates that the population will be between 72 and 73 years old in 2024 and between 81 and 82 years old by 2100. This illustrates the steady advancements in medical treatment, diet, and health.

=== Disease burden ===
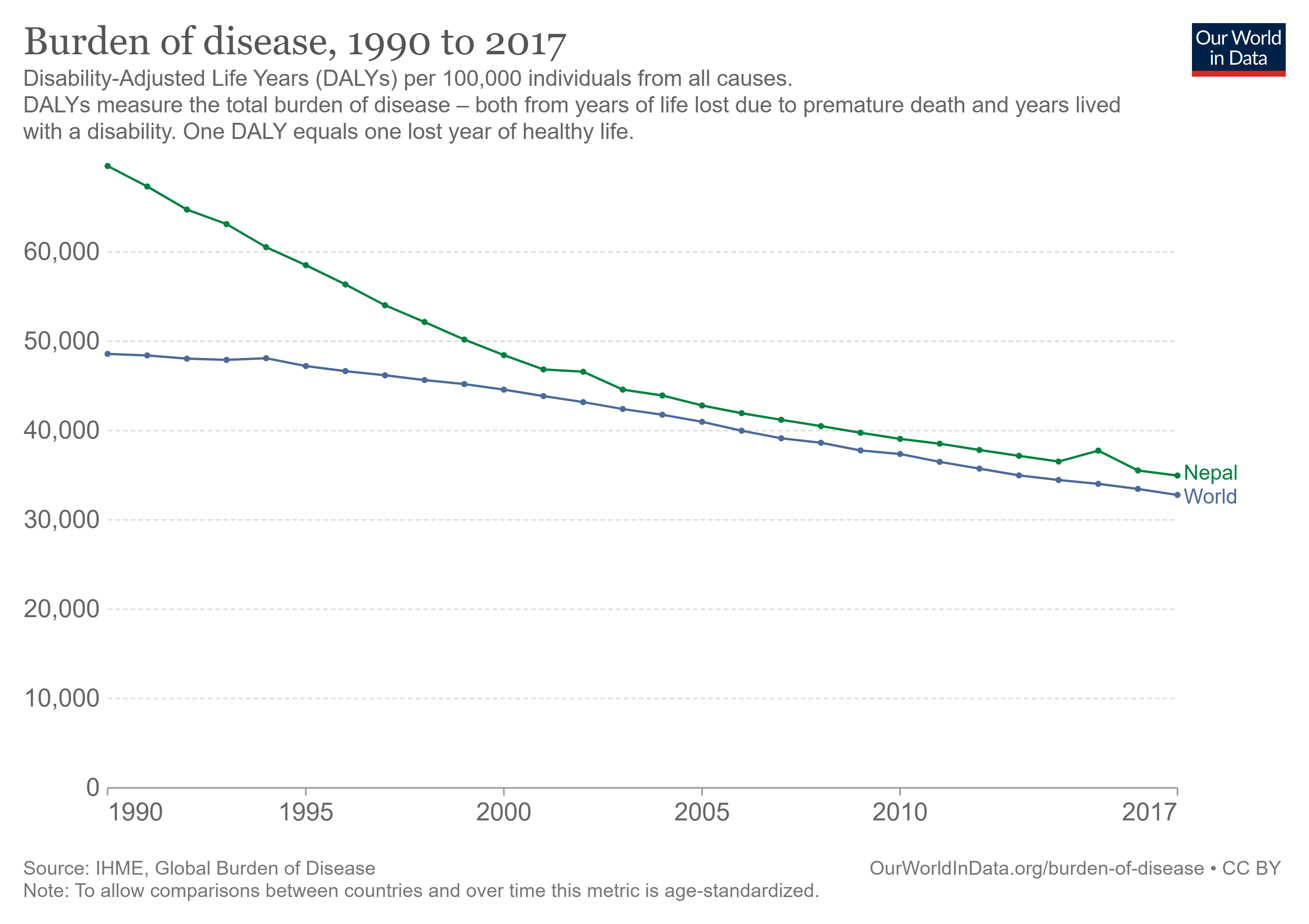
Fig 1: Trend of DALYs lost in Nepal compared to the global average

Disease burden or burden of disease is a concept used to describe the death and loss of health due to diseases, injuries and risk factors. One most common measure used to measure the disease burden is disability adjusted life year (DALY). Developed in 1993, the indicator is a health gap measure and simply the sum of years lost due to premature death and years lived with disability. One DALY represents a loss of one year of healthy life.

Trend analysis

DALYs of Nepal has shown to be dropping down since 1990 but it is still high compared to the global average. Fig 1 shows that the 69,623.23 DALYs lost per 100,000 individuals in Nepal in 1990 has decreased to almost half (34,963.12 DALYs) in 2017. This is close to the global average of 32,796.89 DALYs lost.

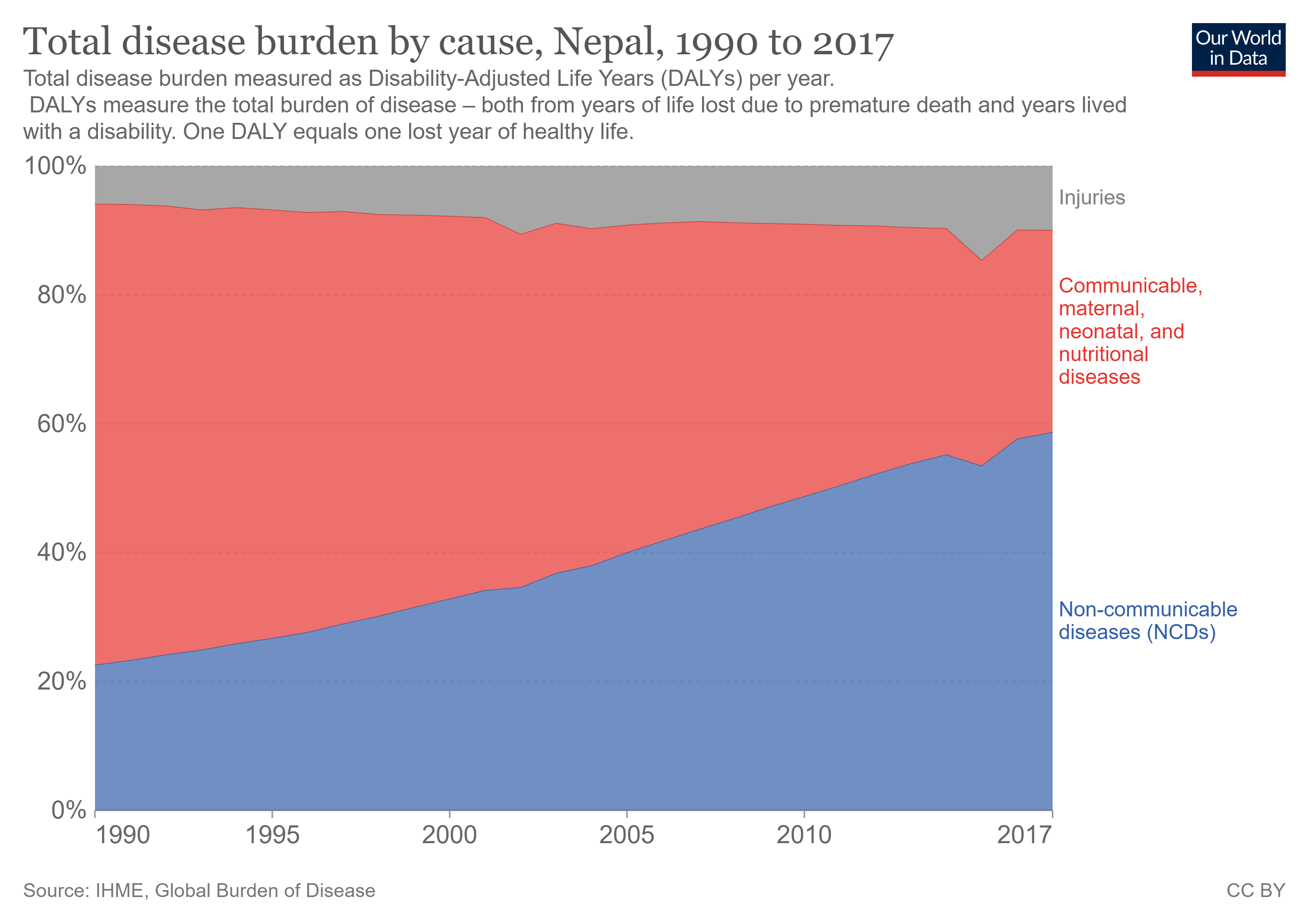
Fig 2: Burden of disease by cause

Disease burden by cause

Dividing the diseases in three common groups of communicable diseases, non- communicable disease (NCD) and injuries (also includes violence, suicides, etc.), a large shift from communicable disease to NCDs can be seen from 1990 to 2017. NCDs has a share of 58.67% of total DALYs lost in 2017 which was only 22.53% in 1990 (refer fig 2)

Below is the table showing how the causes of DALYs lost has changed from 1990 to 2019

Table 1: Top 10 causes of DALYS lost in 1990 and 2019
| S.N | 1990 | 2019 |
|---|---|---|
| 1 | Respiratory infections & TB | Cardiovascular diseases |
| 2 | Maternal and neonatal causes | Maternal and neonatal causes |
| 3 | Other infections | Chronic respiratory illness |
| 4 | Enteric infections | Respiratory infections & TB |
| 5 | Nutritional deficiencies | Neoplasms |
| 6 | Cardiovascular diseases | Mental disorders |
| 7 | Others NCDs | Musculoskeletal disorders |
| 8 | Unintentional injuries | Other NCDs |
| 9 | Chronic respiratory illness | Unintentional injuries |
| 10 | Digestive diseases | Digestive diseases |

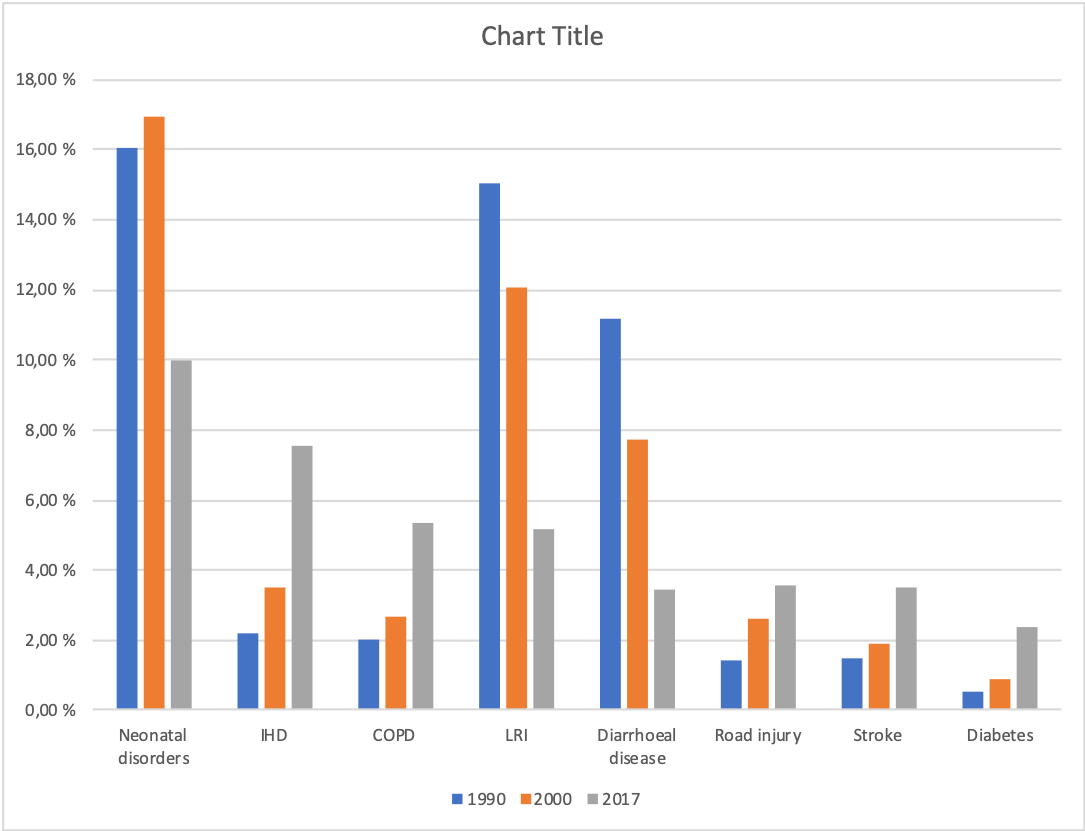
Fig 3: Diseases burden in Nepal (1990–2017)

According to the Global Burden of Disease Study 2017, the eight leading causes of morbidity (illness) and mortality (death) in Nepal are: Neonatal disorders (9.97%), Ischaemic Heart Disease (7.55%), COPD (5.35%), Lower respiratory infection (5.15%), Diarrhoeal disease (3.42%), Road injury (3.56%), Stroke (3.49%), Diabetes (2.35%). The chart (Fig 3) shows the burden of disease prevalence in Nepal over a period of time. Diseases like neonatal disorder, lower respiratory tract infection, and diarrhoeal diseases have shown a gradual decrease in prevalence over the period from 1990 to 2017. The reason for this decrease in number is due to the implementation of several health programs by the government with the involvement of other international organizations such as WHO and UNICEF for maternal and child health, as these diseases are very common among the children. Whereas, there is a remarkable increment in the number of other diseases like Ischemic heart disease (IHD), Chronic obstructive pulmonary disease (COPD), Road injuries, Stroke, and Diabetes.

=== Ischemic heart disease ===
Ischemic Heart Disease (IHD) is gradually emerging as one of the major health challenges in Nepal. It is the most common type of heart disease and cause of heart attacks. The rapid change in lifestyle, unhealthy habits (smoking, sedentary lifestyle etc.), and economic development are considered to be responsible for the increase. Despite a decrease in Ischemic Heart Disease mortality in developed countries, substantial increases have been experienced in developing countries like Nepal. IHD is the number one cause of death in adults from both low and middle-income countries as well as from high-income countries. The incidence of IHD is expected to increase by approximately 29% in women and 48% in men in the developed countries between 1990 and 2020.

A total of 182,751 deaths are estimated in Nepal for the year 2017. Non-communicable diseases (NCDs) are the leading causes of death – two-thirds (66%) of deaths are due to NCDs, with an additional 9% due to injuries. The remaining 25% are due to communicable, maternal, neonatal, and nutritional (CMNN) diseases. Ischemic heart disease (16.4% of total deaths), Chronic obstructive pulmonary disease (COPD) (9.8% of total deaths), Diarrheal diseases (5.6% of total deaths), Lower respiratory infections (5.1% of total deaths), and Intracerebral hemorrhage (3.8% of total deaths), were the top five causes of death in 2017

Ischemic Heart Disease is second burden of disease and the leading cause of death in Nepal for the last 16 years, starting from 2002. Death due to IHD is increasing an alarming rate in Nepal from 65.82 to 100.45 death per 100,000 from 2002 to 2017. So, the large number of epidemiological research is necessary to determine the incidence & prevalence of IHD in Nepal and to identify the magnitude of the problem so that timely primary and secondary prevention can be done. As it is highly preventable and many risk factor are related to our lifestyle like; smoking, obesity, unhealthy diet, etc. So, knowledge and awareness regarding these risk factors are important in the prevention of IHD. Shahid Gangalal National Heart Center conducted a cardiac camp in different parts of Nepal from September 2008 to July 2011. The prevalence of heart disease was found higher in urban areas than rural areas where hypertension claims the major portion. The huge proportion of hypertension in every camp suggests that Nepal is in daring need of preventive programs of heart disease to prevent the catastrophic effect of IHD in near future. Also, according to this study the proportion of IHD ranges from 0.56% (Tikapur) to 15.12% (Birgunj) in Nepal.

Among WHO region in the European region, African region, Region of the Americas and Eastern Mediterranean death rate is in decreasing trend while in Western Pacific, South East Asia it is increasing.

Table 1: Comparison of Death per 100,000 due to Ischemic Heart Disease Between Nepal, Global and 6 WHO Region

| Year | Global | Nepal | European Region | African Region | Western Pacific Region | South East Asia Region | Region of the America | Eastern Mediterranean |
|---|---|---|---|---|---|---|---|---|
| 1990 | 108,72 | 62,72 | 270,32 | 46,77 | 57,29 | 69,11 | 142,27 | 117,37 |
| 2004 | 108,33 | 69,05 | 278,53 | 45,53 | 77,75 | 74 | 114,73 | 114,51 |
| 2010 | 111,15 | 85,32 | 255,58 | 41,26 | 97,39 | 90,74 | 105,73 | 109,89 |
| 2017 | 116,88 | 100,45 | 245,3 | 39,26 | 115,94 | 103,47 | 111,91 | 112,63 |

Distribution according to age and sex:

Incidence of IHD occurs in men between 35 and 45 years age. After the age of 65 the incidence of men and women equalizes, although there is evidence suggesting that more women are being seen with IHD earlier because of increased stress, smoking and menopause. The risk of IHD increases as age increases. Middle-aged adults are mostly affected by IHD. For men, the risk starts to climb at about age 45, and by age 55, the risk becomes double. It continues to increase until, by age 85. For women, the risk of IHD also climbs with age, but the trend begins about 10 years later than in men and especially with the onset of menopause.

=== Tuberculosis ===
Tuberculosis (Nepali: क्षयरोग), the world's most serious public health problem is an infectious bacterial disease caused by the bacillus Mycobacterium. Although most common Mycobacterium species which causes tuberculosis is M. tuberculosis, TB is also caused by M. bovis and M. africanum and occasionally by opportunistic Mycobacteria which are: M. Kansaii, M. malmoense, M. simiae, M. szulgai, M. xenopi, M. avium-intracellulare, M. scrofulacum, and M. chelonei.

Tuberculosis is the most common cause of death due to single organism among person over 5 years of age in low-income countries. In addition, 80% of deaths due to tuberculosis occurs in young to middle age men and women. The incidence of disease in a community may be affected by many factors, including the density of population, the extent of overcrowding and the general standard of living and health care. Certain groups like refugees, HIV infected, person with physical and psychological stress, nursing home residents and impoverished have high risk to develop TB.

The goal 3.3 within the goal 3 of Sustainable Development Goals states "end the epidemics of AIDS, tuberculosis, malaria and neglected tropical diseases and combat hepatitis, water-borne diseases and other communicable diseases" and the targets linked to the end TB strategy are:

- Detect 100% of new sputum smear-positive TB cases and cure at least 85% of these cases.
- Eliminate TB as a public health problem (<1 case per million population) by 2050.

In Nepal, 45% of the total population is infected with TB, out of which 60% are in the productive age group (15–45). Former Director of National Tuberculosis Center Dr. Kedar Narsingh KC stated that among an estimated 40,000 new TB patients every year, only around 25,000 visit health facilities. According to national TB prevalence survey around 69,000 people developed TB in 2018. In addition, 117,000 people are living with the disease in Nepal.

Table: Age group distribution of TB patients in Nepal
| Age group | Male (%) | Female (%) | % |
| 10–14 | 0.4 | 0.7 | 0.5 |
| 15–19 | 8.8 | 15.8 | 10.8 |
| 20–24 | 16.6 | 20.1 | 17.6 |
| 25–29 | 15.8 | 10.8 | 14.4 |
| 30–34 | 9.8 | 14.0 | 11 |
| 35–39 | 10.6 | 9.3 | 10.3 |
| 40–44 | 8.4 | 9.7 | 8.7 |
| 45–49 | 8.2 | 6.5 | 7.7 |
| 50–54 | 8.7 | 7.5 | 8.3 |
| 55–59 | 8.1 | 5.4 | 7.3 |
| 60–64 | 1.1 | 0.4 | 0.9 |
| 65 and above | 0.7 | 0.4 | 0.5 |
| Not mentioned | 2.0 | 0.0 | 2.0 |
| Total | 100 | 100 | 100 |

There are 624 microscopy centers registered whereas the National TB Reference Laboratories, National tuberculosis centre and GENETUP perform culture and drug susceptibility testing service in Nepal.

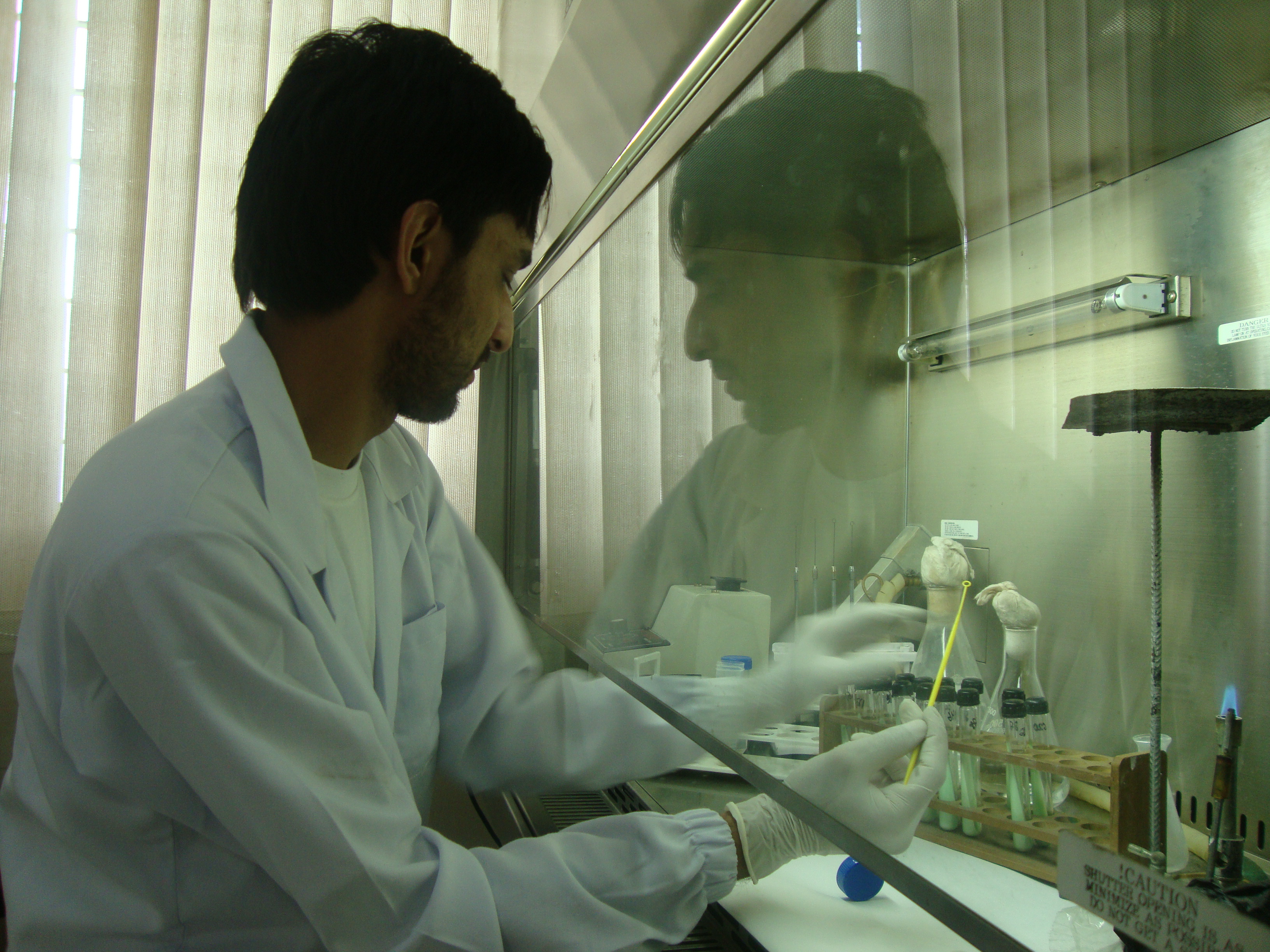
Microbiologist researcher working at joint laboratory of National Tuberculosis Centre and SAARC TB and HIV/AIDS centre, Bhaktapur.

National Tuberculosis control program (NTP) employs directly observed treatment strategy (DOTS). In 1995, World Health Organization recommended DOTS as one of the most cost effective strategies available for tuberculosis control. DOTS is the strategy for improving treatment outcome by giving drugs to the patients under direct observation of health workers. DOTS has been found to be 100% effective for tuberculosis control. There are around 4323 TB treatment centers in Nepal. Although introduction of DOTS has already reduced the numbers of deaths, however 5,000 to 7,000 people still continue to die each year.

The burden of drug resistance tuberculosis is estimated at 1500 (0.84 to 2.4) cases annually. But only 350 to 450 Multidrug resistance TB are reported yearly. So, in NTP's strategic plan 2016–2021, the main objective is to diagnose 100% of the MDR TB by 2021 and to successfully treat a minimum 75% of those cases.

=== HIV/AIDS ===
Making up approximately 8.1% of the total estimated population of 40,723, there were about 3,282 children aged 14 years or younger living with HIV in Nepal in 2013. There are 3,385 infections estimated among the population aged 50 years and above (8.3% of the total population). By sex, males account for two‐thirds (66%) of the infections and the remaining, more than one‐third (34%) of infections are in females, out of which around 92.2% are in the reproductive age group of 15‐49 years. The male to female sex ratio of total infection decreased from 2.15 in 2006 to 1.95 in 2013 and is projected to be 1.86 by 2020. The epidemic in Nepal is driven by injecting drug users, migrants, sex workers & their clients and MSM. Results from the 2007 Integrated Bio-Behavioral Surveillance Study (IBBS) among IDUs in Kathmandu, Pokhara, and East and West Terai indicate that the highest prevalence rates have been found among urban IDUs, 6.8% to 34.7% of whom are HIV-positive, depending on location. In terms of absolute numbers, Nepal's 1.5 million to 2 million labor migrants account for the majority of Nepal's HIV-positive population. In one subgroup, 2.8% of migrants returning from Mumbai, India, were infected with HIV, according to the 2006 IBBS among migrants.

As of 2007, HIV prevalence among female sex workers and their clients was less than 2% and 1%, respectively, and 3.3% among urban-based MSM. HIV infections are more common among men than women, as well as in urban areas and the far western region of Nepal, where migrant labor is more common. Labor migrants make up 41% of the total known HIV infections in Nepal, followed by clients of sex workers (15.5 percent) and IDUs (10.2 percent).

=== Diarrhoeal diseases ===
Diarrhoeal disease is one of the leading causes of death globally which is mainly caused by bacterial, viral or parasitic organisms. In addition, the other factors include malnutrition, contaminated water and food sources, animal faeces, and person-to-person transmission due to poor hygienic conditions. Diarrhoea is an indication of intestinal tract infection which is characterized by the passage of loose or liquid stool three or more times a day, or more than a normal passage per day. This disease can be prevented by action of several measures including access to contamination-free water and food sources, hand washes with soap and water, personal hygiene and sanitation, breastfeeding the child for at least six months of life, vaccination against Rotavirus and general awareness among the people. Treatment is performed by rehydration with oral rehydration salt (ORS) solution, use of zinc supplements, administration of intravenous fluid in case of severe dehydration or shock, and the continuing supply of nutrient-rich food, especially to malnourished children.

Global Burden of Disease Study shows that diarrhoeal diseases account for 5.91% of total deaths among all age groups of Nepal in 2017. In the same year, the data indicates that diarrhoeal diseases has the highest cause of death of 9.14% in the age group 5–14 years followed by 8.91% deaths in 70+ age group.

A study showed the presence of enteropathogens in more than two-thirds of diarrhoeal faeces. A survey done in Kathmandu showed the presence of Giardia cysts in 43% of the water samples tested. Similarly, diarrhoea and dysentery causing bacteria such as Escherichia coli, Shigella species, Campylobacter species, Vibrio cholerae are found to be more common in contaminated drinking water of Nepal. In 2009, a large cholera outbreak occurred in Jajarkot and its neighboring districts affecting around thirty thousand people and over five hundred deaths, and it has been endemic for a long time in different parts of Nepal. Viral diarrhoea is mainly caused by Rotavirus but a few cases of Norovirus and Adenovirus was also observed in a type of study.

The following table shows the prevalence of diarrhea among under-five children in all five development regions of Nepal in the year 2006, 2011 and 2016.

Observed diarrhea prevalence among children under 5 years old in development regions of Nepal, categorized by survey years.
| Development regions | 2006 | | 2011 | | 2016 | |
|---|---|---|---|---|---|---|
| | No.of respondents | Prevalence% | No.of respondents | Prevalence% | No.of respondents | Prevalence% |
| Eastern | 1217 | 11.83 | 1148 | 11.66 | 902 | 6.33 |
| Central | 1342 | 12.30 | 1066 | 15.02 | 1264 | 9.67 |
| Western | 1281 | 12.87 | 1159 | 15.63 | 923 | 5.39 |
| Mid-western | 778 | 9.32 | 914 | 14.37 | 1078 | 8.49 |
| Far-western | 798 | 12.07 | 741 | 10.94 | 660 | 6.22 |
| Total | 5416 | 11.99 | 5028 | 13.92 | 4827 | 7.67 |

=== Maternal and neonatal health ===
Maternal and neonatal health (MNH) is one of the top priorities of the Ministry of Health and Population of Nepal (MoHP). Nepal is also a signatory to the Sustainable Development Goals (SDGs), which have set ambitious targets for the country to reduce the Maternal Mortality Ratio (MMR) to 70 per 100,000 live births and Neonatal Mortality Rate (NMR) to 12 per 1,000 live births, and to achieve coverage of 90% for four Antenatal care visits (ANC), institutional delivery, Skilled Birth Attendant (SBA)delivery, and three Post Natal care (PNC) check-ups by 2030. However, the country still has a high Maternal Mortality Ratio (186 per 100,000 live births), compared to its neighboring South Asian countries such as India (145), Bhutan (183), Bangladesh (173), Pakistan (140), and Sri Lanka (36). Although, there have been decrease in maternal mortality ratio from 553 per 100,000 live births in 2000 to 183 per 100,000 live births in 2017, the change in trend is still not significant to meet SDG target. In the other hand, there has been some decrease in the neonatal death rate (19 per 1,000 live births) in 2018 compared to 33 per 1,000 live births in 2011, in the country.

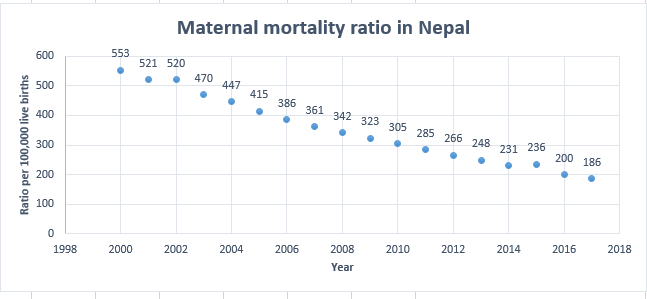
Fig: Trend of maternal mortality ratio in Nepal, Data Source SDG country profiles data on maternal mortality ratio

==== Safe motherhood program ====
Safe motherhood means ensuring that all women receive the care they need to be safe and healthy throughout the period of pregnancy, delivery and post delivery. Nepal has been implementing the Safe Motherhood Programme since 1997. Safe Motherhood program consists of various activities and services provided in community level as well as institutional levels. Following are the activities included in safe motherhood program

- Birth Preparedness Package and community level maternal and newborn care

This program is aimed to provide information about danger signs in pregnancy, after delivery and new born care as well as, importance of preparedness for delivery. Program is mainly focused on creating awareness of health facilities, preparedness of funds, transportation, blood donors etc.

- Emergency referral funds

The program is aimed to support emergency referral transport of women from poor, marginalized groups and geographically disadvantaged communities.

- Safe abortion services

comprehensive abortion services are provided under this program which includes pre and post counselling on abortion methods, post abortion contraceptives methods, termination of pregnancy as national protocol, diagnosis and treatment of reproductive tract infections and follow up for post abortion management.

- Rural Ultrasound Programme

The programme focuses on 11 remote districts of Dhading, Mugu, sindupalchowk, Darchula, Bajura, Solukhumbu, Accham, Bajhang, Humla, Baitadi and Dhankuta. The main objective of this program is early identification and referral of pregnancy related complications by a health professional.

- Prevention and management of Reproductive Health morbidity

This activity focuses on management of pelvic organ prolapse, screening of cervical cancer along with prevention training and management of obstetric fistula.

- Nyano Jhola Programme

The program was launched in 2069/2070 with the aim of reducing hypothermia and infections in newborns and maximize institutional delivery. under this program every child born in an institution is given two sets of clothes and one set of wrapper for newborn and a gown for mother.

- Aama and Newborn Programme

Government has introduced this program to improve care and encourage institutional delivery. This program has different provisions that are carried out in present one of the most important program that targeted promoting institutional delivery is transport incentive for institutional delivery, cash initiatives are given to women after institutional delivery (NPR 3000 in mountains, NPR 2000 in hills and NPR 1000 in Terai districts). similarly, Incentive of NPR 800 is given to women on completion of 4 Antenatal Care visits at 4,6, 8 and 9 months of pregnancy. There is also provision of free institutional delivery, health institutions are paid for providing free delivery care.

Despite all of the above-mentioned longstanding efforts of MoHP to improve maternal and neonatal health in Nepal, the progress has been slow and there is much more to improve to achieve the 2030 target. Economic, geographic and socio-cultural disparities are some of the bottlenecks in improving of maternal health services in the country. Women living under poverty, remote areas and with less education are less likely to access maternal health services. Therefore, the government has to develop and implement the intervention and programme that are more focused toward underserved and marginalized women population

Table: Trends in maternal and neonatal health indicators

| | 2011 | 2016 | 2018 |
| Neonatal death rate/1000 live birth | 33 | 21 | 19 |
| Proportion of 4 ANC visit (%) | 50 | 69 | 56 |
| Institutional delivery (%) | 35 | 57 | 63 |
| SBA delivery (%) | 36 | 58 | 60 |
| PNC visit ( 3 visits per protocol) % | no data | 16 | 19 |

=== Oral health ===
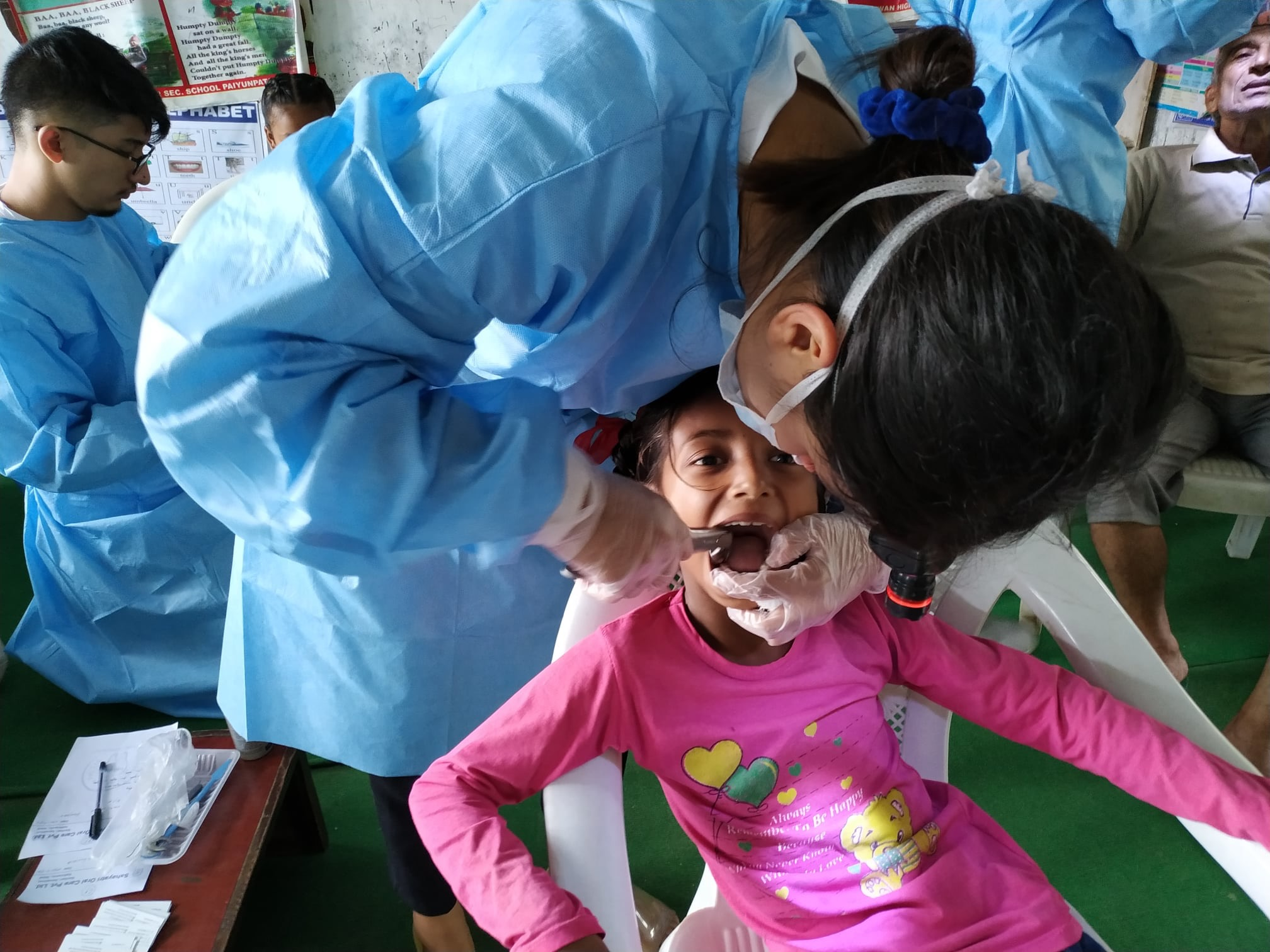
Oral Health Check up

Oral health is an essential prerequisite for a healthy life. Attempting to maintain good oral health in developing countries like Nepal is a challenging task. According to the Annual report of Department of Health Services (2009/10), 392,831 have dental caries/toothache, 73,309 have periodontal diseases, 62,747 and 113,819 have oral ulcer, mucosa and other related diseases. The data shows a high prevalence of oral health problems in the population of the country. Many of these diseases in the population are due to poverty and lack of oral health awareness. According to the Journal of Nepal Dental Association National Oral Health 'Pathfinder' Survey 2004 shows prevalence of dental decay in adolescents studying in school is lower, which is 25.6% for 12 to 16 years of age. This can be due to the use of fluoridated toothpaste and awareness in the school going adults. However, periodontal/gum diseases cases tends to be higher in adolescents which is 62.8% for 12 to 13 years and 61% for 15 to 16 years. And the incidence of oral cancer ranges from 1 to 10 cases per 1,000,000 populations in most countries

In countries like Nepal where majority of people are living under poverty, access to healthcare, education and awareness programs have been major constraints in improving oral health. High consumption of both smoked and smokeless form of tobacco in the people has been strongly associated with the majority of the oral health problems. Prevalence of cleaning teeth at least once a day was 94.9%, while that of cleaning teeth at least twice a day was measured to be only 9.9%. Use of fluoridated toothpaste was seen among 71.4%. It is also very common among people in the rural area to brush their teeth with the thin bamboo stick which is called "Datiwan" in the local language, sand and ash. And only 3.9% have made a dental visit in the last 6 months.

Table: Distribution of oral hygiene practices among different age groups

| Age Groups (years) | Cleaning teeth at least once a day | Cleaning teeth at least twice a day | Fluoridated toothpaste | Dental visits (within 6 months) |
|---|---|---|---|---|
| 15–29 | 97.9% | 13.1% | 79.3% | 2.8% |
| 30–44 | 94.8% | 8.2% | 69.1% | 4.0% |
| 45–69 | 89.6% | 6.2% | 57.6% | 6.1% |

The government of Nepal does not advocate for institutions like WHO or UNICEF to provide the kind of support that they do for other medical issues because they do not prioritize oral health. Also, several misconceptions are very relevant among people like loosening of teeth is normal with increasing age, and losing some teeth will not kill people. The majority of people only seek treatment when the disease has worsened or causes unbearable pain.

=== Child health ===
Nepal is also on track to achieve MDG 4, having attained a rate of 35.8 under 5 child deaths per 1000 live births in 2015, down from 162 in 1991 according to national data. Global estimates indicate that the rate has been reduced by 65% from 128 to 48 per 1000 live births between 1991 and 2013. Nepal has successfully improved coverage of effective interventions to prevent or treat the most important causes of child mortality through a variety of community-based and national campaign approaches. These include high coverage of semiannual vitamin A supplementation and deworming; CB-IMCI; high rates of full child immunization; and moderate coverage of exclusive breastfeeding of children under 6 months. However, in the past few years, the NMR has remained stagnant with it being stated at around 22.2 deaths per 1000 live births in 2015. This compares to a rate of 27.7 in India (2015) and 45.5 in Pakistan (2015).

The NMR is a serious concern in Nepal, accounting for 76% of the infant mortality rate (IMR) and 58% of the under 5 mortality rate (U5MR) as of 2015, and is one of its challenges going forward. Typically, a history of conflict negatively affects health indicators. However, Nepal made progress in most health indicators despite its decade-long armed conflict. Attempts to understand this has provided a number of possible explanations including the fact that in most instances the former rebels did not purposely disrupt delivery of health services; pressure was applied on health workers to attend clinics and provide services in rebel base areas; the conflict created an environment for improved coordination among key actors; and Nepal's public health system adopted approaches that targeted disadvantaged groups and remote areas, particularly community-based approaches for basic service delivery with a functional community support system through female community health volunteers (FCHVs), women's groups and Health Facility Operational Management Committees (HFOMCs).

==== Child health programmes ====
The Nepalese Child Health Division of the Ministry of Health and Population (MOHP), has launched several child survival interventions, including various operational initiatives, to improve the health of children in Nepal. These include the Expanded Program on Immunisation (EPI), the Community-Based Integrated Management of Childhood Illnesses (CB-IMCI) program, the Community-Based Newborn Care Program (CB-NCP), the Infant and Young Child Feeding program, a micro-nutrients supplementation program, vitamin A and deworming campaign, and the Community-Based Management of Acute Malnutrition program.

===== Immunization =====
The National Immunisation Program is a priority 1 (P1) program in Nepal. Since the inception of the program, it has been universally established and successfully implemented. Immunization services can be obtained for free from EPI clinics in hospitals, other health centers, mobile and outreach clinics, non-governmental organizations and private clinics. The government has provided all vaccines and immunization-related logistics without any cost to hospitals, private institutions, and nursing homes. Nepal has since gained recognition for the success of the program, in relation to its successful coverage of 97% population equally, regardless of wealth, gender and age. However, despite the widespread success of the National Immunisation Program, inequities still exist. Nevertheless, the trends in last past 15 years have shown promising positive changes indicating possibilities of achieving complete immunization coverage. Two more vaccines were introduced between 2014 and 2015 – the inactivated poliomyelitis vaccine (IPV) and the pneumococcal conjugate vaccine (PCV). Six districts of Nepal are declared with 99.9% immunization coverage. Nepal achieved polio-free status on 27 March 2014. Neonatal and maternal tetanus was already eliminated in 2005 and Japanese encephalitis is in a controlled state. Nepal is also on track to meet the target of the elimination of measles by 2019. One percent of children in Nepal have not yet received any of the vaccine coverage.

Despite national progress toward measles elimination—including the verification of rubella elimination in 2025—Nepal experienced a resurgence of localized measles outbreaks in early 2026 that exposed critical subnational immunity gaps. In January 2026, an outbreak in Malangwa Municipality, Sarlahi District, recorded 34 cases, while a separate outbreak in Baglung District, linked to an index case returning from India, reached 136 cases by March 2026. Although local health authorities responded rapidly with active case searches, laboratory confirmations within 72 hours, vitamin A supplementation, and targeted outbreak response immunization (ORI) campaigns, these events demonstrated that administrative declarations of high coverage often obscure pockets of susceptibility among marginalized, poor, and migrant-linked communities.

===== Community-Based Integrated Management of Childhood Illnesses (CB-IMCI) =====
The Community-Based Integrated Management of Childhood Illness (CB-IMCI) program is an integrated package that addresses the management of diseases such as pneumonia, diarrhea, malaria, and measles, as well as malnutrition, among children aged 2 months to 5 years. It also includes management of infection, Jaundice, Hyperthermia and counseling on breastfeeding for young infants less than 2 months of age. CB-IMCI program has been implemented up to the community level in all the districts of Nepal and it has shown positive results in the management of childhood illnesses. Over the past decade, Nepal has had success in reducing under-five mortality, largely due to the implementation of the CB-IMCI program. Initially, the Control of Diarrheal Diseases (CDD) Program began in 1982; and the Control of Acute Respiratory Infections (ARI) Program was initiated in 1987. The CDD and ARI programs were merged into the CB-IMCI program in 1998.

===== Community-Based Newborn Care Program (CB-NCP) =====
The Nepal Family Health Survey 1996, Nepal Demographic and Health Surveys, and World Health Organization estimations over time have shown that neonatal mortality in Nepal has been decreasing at a slower rate than infant and child mortality. The Nepal Demographic and Health Survey 2011 has shown 33 neonatal deaths per 1,000 live births, which accounts for 61% of under 5 deaths. The major causes of neonatal death in Nepal are an infection, birth asphyxia, preterm birth, and hypothermia. Given Nepal's existing health service indicators, it becomes clear that strategies to address neonatal mortality in Nepal must consider the fact that 72% of births take place at home (NDHS 2011).

Therefore, as an urgent step to reduce neonatal mortality, Ministry of Health and Population (MoHP) initiated a new program called 'Community-Based Newborn Care Package' (CB-NCP) based on the 2004 National Neonatal Health Strategy.

===== National Nutritional Program =====
The National Nutrition Program under the Department of Health Services has set its ultimate goal as "all Nepali people living with adequate nutrition, food safety and food security for adequate physical, mental and social growth and equitable human capital development and survival" with the mission to improve the overall nutritional status of children, women of childbearing age, pregnant women, and all ages through the control of general malnutrition and the prevention and control of micronutrient deficiency disorders having a broader inter and intra sectoral collaboration and coordination, partnership among different stakeholders and high level of awareness and cooperation of population in general.

Malnutrition remains a serious obstacle to child survival, growth, and development in Nepal. The most common form of malnutrition is protein-energy malnutrition (PEM). Other common forms of malnutrition are iodine, iron, and vitamin A deficiency. These deficiencies often appear together in many cases. Moderately acute and severely acutely malnourished children are more likely to die from common childhood illnesses than those adequately nourished. In addition, malnutrition constitutes a serious threat to young children and is associated with about one-third of child mortality. Major causes of PEM in Nepal is low birth weight of below 2.5 kg due to poor maternal nutrition, inadequate dietary intake, frequent infections, household food insecurity, poor feeding behaviour and poor care & practices leading to an intergenerational cycle of malnutrition.

An analysis of the causes of stunted growth in Nepal reveals that around half is rooted in poor maternal nutrition, and the other half in poor infant and young child nutrition. Around a quarter of babies are born with a low birth weight. As per the findings of Nepal Demographic and Health Survey (NDHS, 2011), 41 percent of children below 5 years of age are stunted. A survey by NDHS and NMICS also showed that 30% of the children are underweight and 11% of children below 5 years are wasted.

In order to address under-nutrition problems in young children, the Government of Nepal (GoN) has implemented:

a) Infant and Young Child Feeding (IYCF)
b) Control of Protein Energy Malnutrition (PEM)
c) Control of Iodine Deficiency Disorder (IDD)
d) Control of Vitamin A Deficiency (VAD)
e) Control of Iron Deficiency Anaemia (IDA)
f) Deworming of children aged 1 to 5 years and vitamin A capsule distribution
g) Community Management of Acute Malnutrition (CMAM)
h) Hospital-based nutrition management and rehabilitation

The hospital-based nutrition management and rehabilitation program treats severe malnourished children at Out-patient Therapeutic Program (OTP) centres in Health Facilities. As per requirement, the package is linked with the other nutrition programs such as the Child Nutrition Grant, Micronutrient powder (MNP) distribution to young children (6 to 23 months) and food distribution in the food insecure areas.

===== Infant and Young Child Feeding program =====
UNICEF and WHO recommended that children be exclusively breastfed (no other liquid, solid food, or plain water) during the first six months of life (WHO/UNICEF, 2002). The nutrition program under the 2004 National Nutrition Policy and Strategy promotes exclusive breastfeeding through the age of 6 months and, thereafter, the introduction of semisolid or solid foods along with continued breast milk until the child is at least age 2. Introducing breast milk substitutes to infants before age 6 months can contribute to breastfeeding failure. Substitutes, such as formula, other kinds of milk and porridge are often watered down and provide too few calories. Furthermore, possible contamination of these substitutes exposes the infant to the risk of illness. Nepal's Breast Milk Substitute Act (2049) of 1992 promotes and protects breastfeeding and regulates the unauthorized or unsolicited sale and distribution of breast milk substitutes.

After six months, a child requires adequate complementary foods for normal growth. Lack of appropriate complementary feeding may lead to malnutrition and frequent illnesses, which in turn may lead to death. However, even with complementary feeding, the child should continue to be breastfed for two years or more.

==== Practice of exclusive breastfeeding after Normal delivery and C-section ====
Adequate nutrition during infancy is crucial for child survival, optimal growth and development throughout life. It has been postulated that 13% of the current under-five mortality rate could be averted by promoting proper breastfeeding practices, which is seemingly the single most cost effective intervention to reduce child mortality in resource-constrained settings such as in Nepal. Childhood malnutrition and growth faltering affects more than half of children under five in developing countries, and usually starts during infancy, possibly due to improper breastfeeding and mixed feeding practices.

According to WHO, exclusive breastfeeding is defined as no other food or drink, not even water, except breastmilk (including milk expressed or from a wet nurse) for 6 months of life, but allows the infant to receive ORS, drops and syrups (vitamins, minerals and medicines). Exclusive breastfeeding for the first 6 months of life is the recommended way of feeding infants, followed by continued breastfeeding with appropriate complementary foods for up to 2 years or beyond.

As per the study carried out in Paropakar Maternity & Women's Hospital, Thapathali, 2017, the participants of normal delivery had an opportunity to breastfeed within an hour while almost all participants going through C-section were not offered to do so.

The reason for participants to not practice breastfeeding within an hour were mother's sickness, unable to hold the baby due to suture, baby taken away from mother, and less or no production of breast milk soon after surgery to feed the child. In addition, (as shown in table below) 84.7% of normal delivery participants did not feed anything other than breast milk to their babies while 78% of C-sectioned participants fed formula to their babies after they had started breastfeeding.

Table: Baby fed anything other than breast milk after starting breastfeeding
| Methods of delivery | Fed anything other than breast milk to baby | Percent |
| Normal delivery | Yes | 15.33 |
| Normal delivery | No | 84.66 |
| Normal delivery | Total | 100 |
| Cesarean delivery | Yes | 56 |
| Cesarean delivery | No | 44 |
| Cesarean delivery | Total | 100 |

The participants assumed that formula-fed babies were more likely to gain weight more quickly than breastfed babies. These might be the major increasing drawbacks for the practice of exclusive breastfeeding in Nepal.

The perspective towards breastfeeding is found to be optimistic, believing to the benefits of breastfeeding were not only for a limited period; is always convenient, healthier and cheaper than formula. Exclusive breastfeeding has always been considered as an ideal food for the baby up to six months after birth.

We can say that mode of delivery is significant with initiation of breastfeeding within an hour. This means the practice of exclusive breastfeeding is higher among normal deliveries than C-sections. From analysis of Nepal demographic and health survey, 2011; Two in every three mothers had initiated breastfeeding within one hour of childbirth.

In some cultures including Nepal there is a preference for the introduction of prelacteal feeds. Economic status and the mother's education status were significant factors associated with the introduction of prelacteal feeds. The lower socio-economic groups have less access to the expensive prelacteal feeds such as ghee or honey and therefore exclusive breastfeeding is the only option available. This might be a reason for the reported lower prelacteal feeding practice rates amongst the poorest wealth groups in Nepal.

=== Geriatric health ===
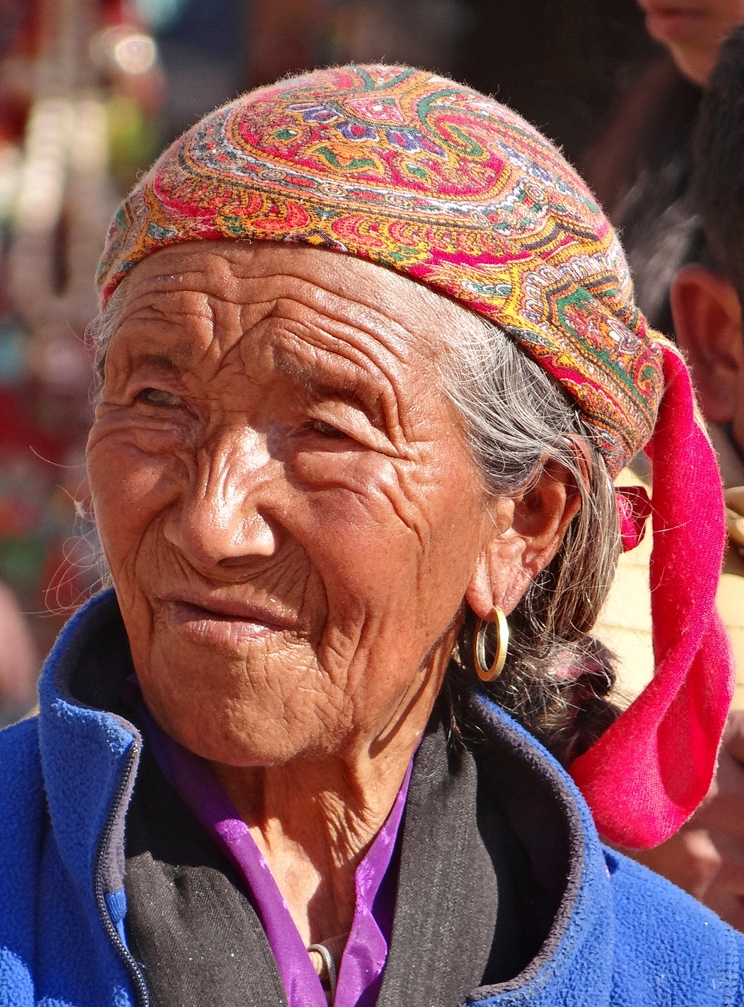
An old lady from Nepal

Geriatrics is a branch of medicine concerned with the diagnosis, treatment and prevention of disease in older people and the problems specific to ageing.

According to an article published in The Lancet in 2014, 23% of the total global burden of disease is attributable to disorders in people aged 60 years and older. Although the proportion of the burden is highest in high-income regions, DALYs per head are 40% higher in low-income and middle-income regions. The leading contributors to disease burden in older people are cardiovascular diseases (30·3%), malignant neoplasms (15·1%), chronic respiratory diseases (9·5%), musculoskeletal diseases (7·5%), and neurological and mental disorders (6·6%).

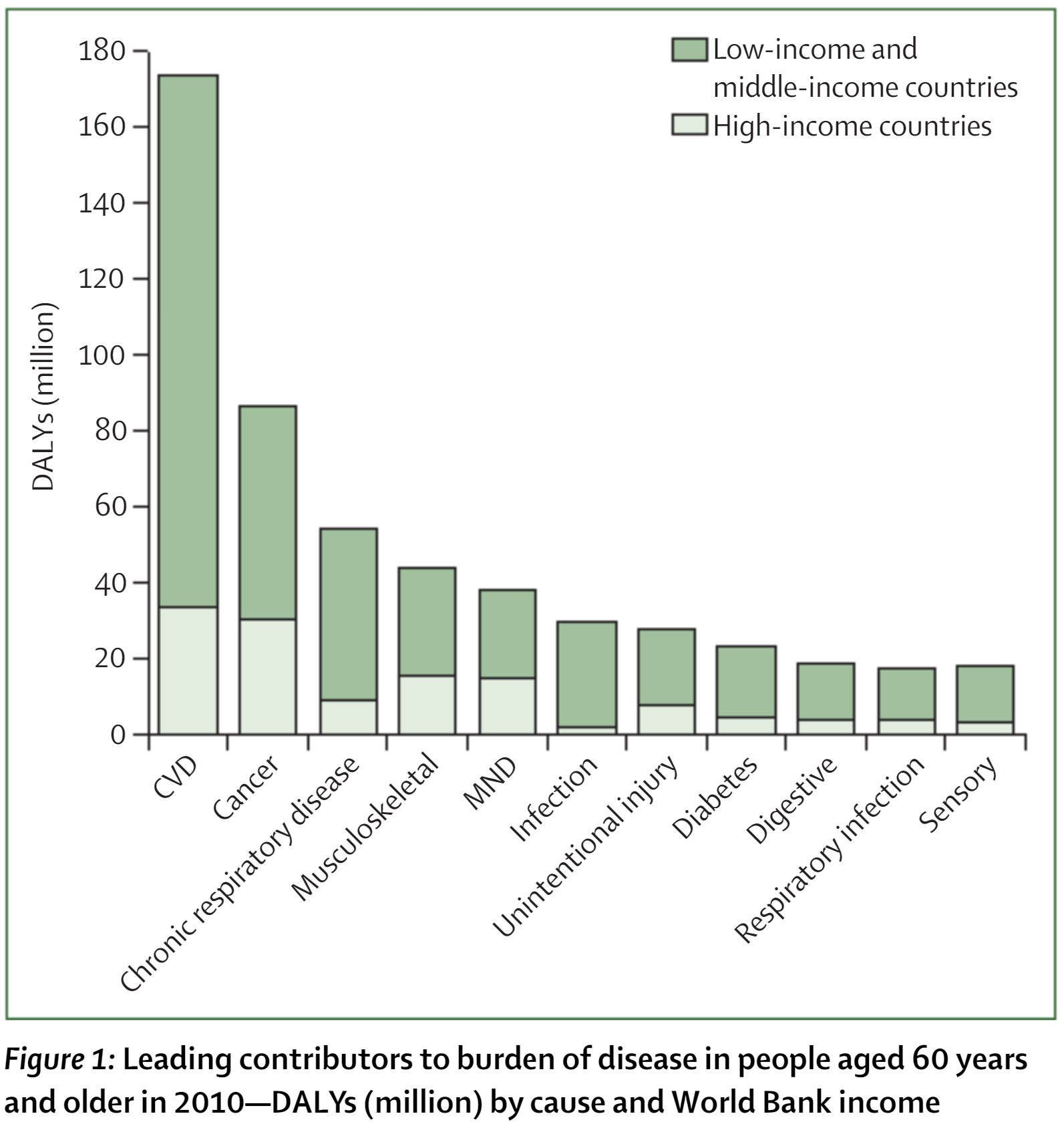

==== Background ====
The Senior Citizens Acts 2063, Nepal defines the senior citizens (elderly population) as "people who are 60 years and above". About 9% of the total population accounts for 60+ population and the number is projected to be around 20% by 2050. The elderly population has been increasing rapidly and one of the main reasons behind this is positive development in life expectancy. The other reason is the reduction in mortality and fertility rates which has shown dramatic increase in the proportion of elderly people in the country. This is seen to have a profound impact on the individuals, families and communities. The increase in the population of elderly has given rise to challenges in both developmental and humanitarian areas in terms of promoting their well-being by meeting their social, emotional, health, financial and developmental needs. Various observations show that the proportion of elderly population is high in Mountain and Hilly regions in comparison to Terai. Similarly, it is noted that the female elderly population is higher than the male elderly population among three ecological regions.

With the ongoing growth in the geriatric population and insufficient availability of healthcare services in a developing country like Nepal, ageing seems to be a challenging domain.

==== Geriatric health disorders ====
The Nepal Living Standard Survey (NLSS III (2010–2011)) has reported that the percentage of population reporting chronic illness by gender has been the highest at 38 percent in the age group 60 years and above. Of them, women are the worse sufferers with 39.6 percent reporting chronic illness compared to 36.4% for men. This means that the incidence of chronic illness among the elderly population remains quite acute and widespread, and more so for women elderly.

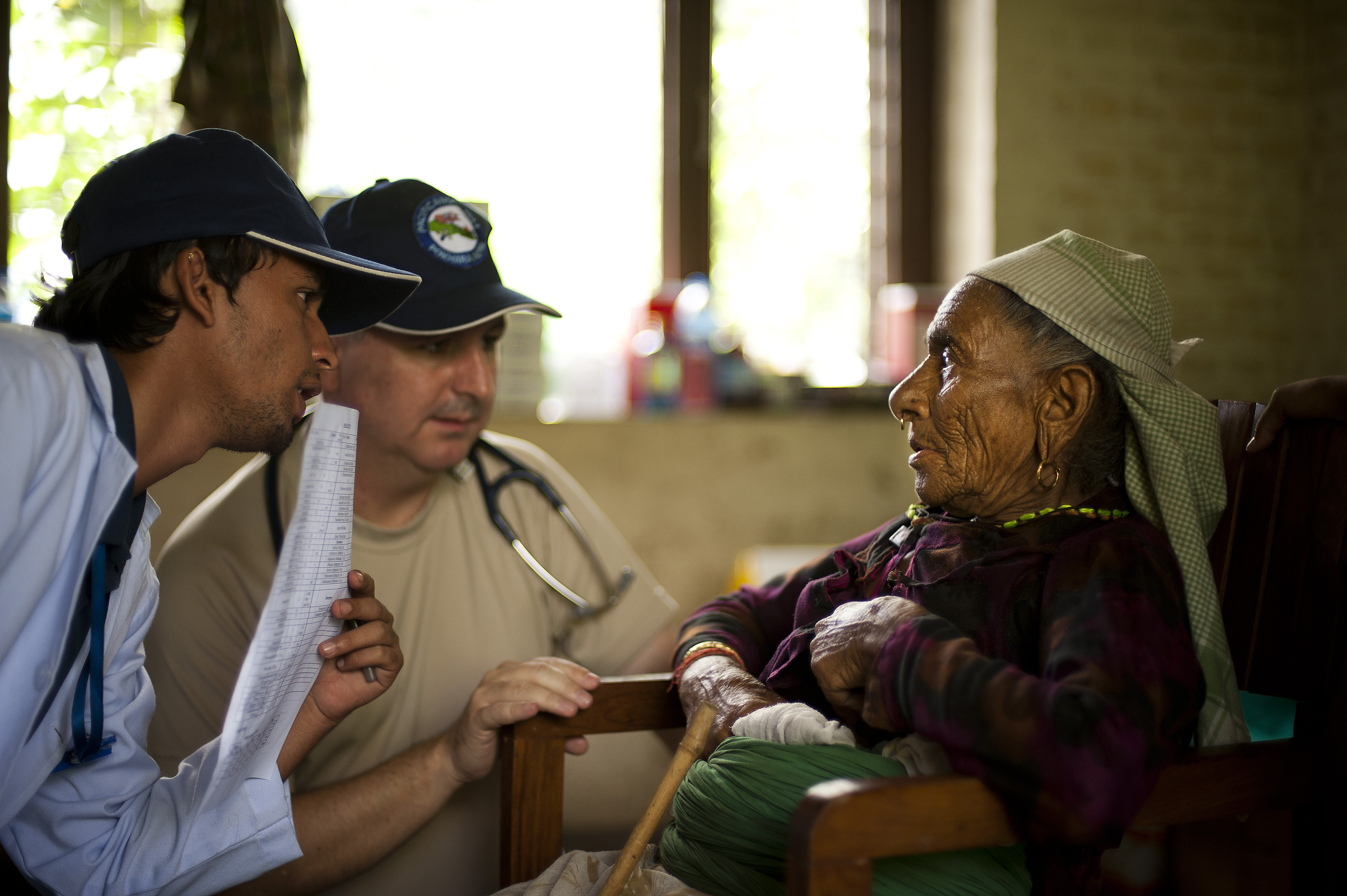
An elderly woman being examined by health personnel

Prevalence of chronic diseases in old age is a common phenomenon. Most of the common geriatric diseases in Nepal include gastritis, arthritis, hypertension, COPD, infections, eye problems, back pain, dementia, headache, diabetes, paralysis and heart problems. Moreover, elderly people tend to develop certain kinds of neuro-degenerative diseases such as dementia, Alzheimer's and Parkinson's, among others.

In a study done on geriatric health issues among elderly population of Nepal, it was seen that more than half of elderly population with chronic illness had low adherence to medication. The existence of comorbidities was associated with deteriorating health-related quality of life (HRQOL) among older people.

A study done among the elderly patients (N=210) attending psychiatry OPD at a tertiary care hospital manifested that the prevalence of dementia was 11.4% among which Alzheimer's constituted 70.8% of total cases followed by vascular dementia (25%). Significant association of dementia was seen with age, occupation and Mini Mental State Examination (MMSE) score. Among other psychiatric comorbidities, depression (36.7%) was found to be the most common mental illness followed by neurotic, stress related and somatoform disorders (13.8%) and Alcohol dependence syndrome (12.9%).

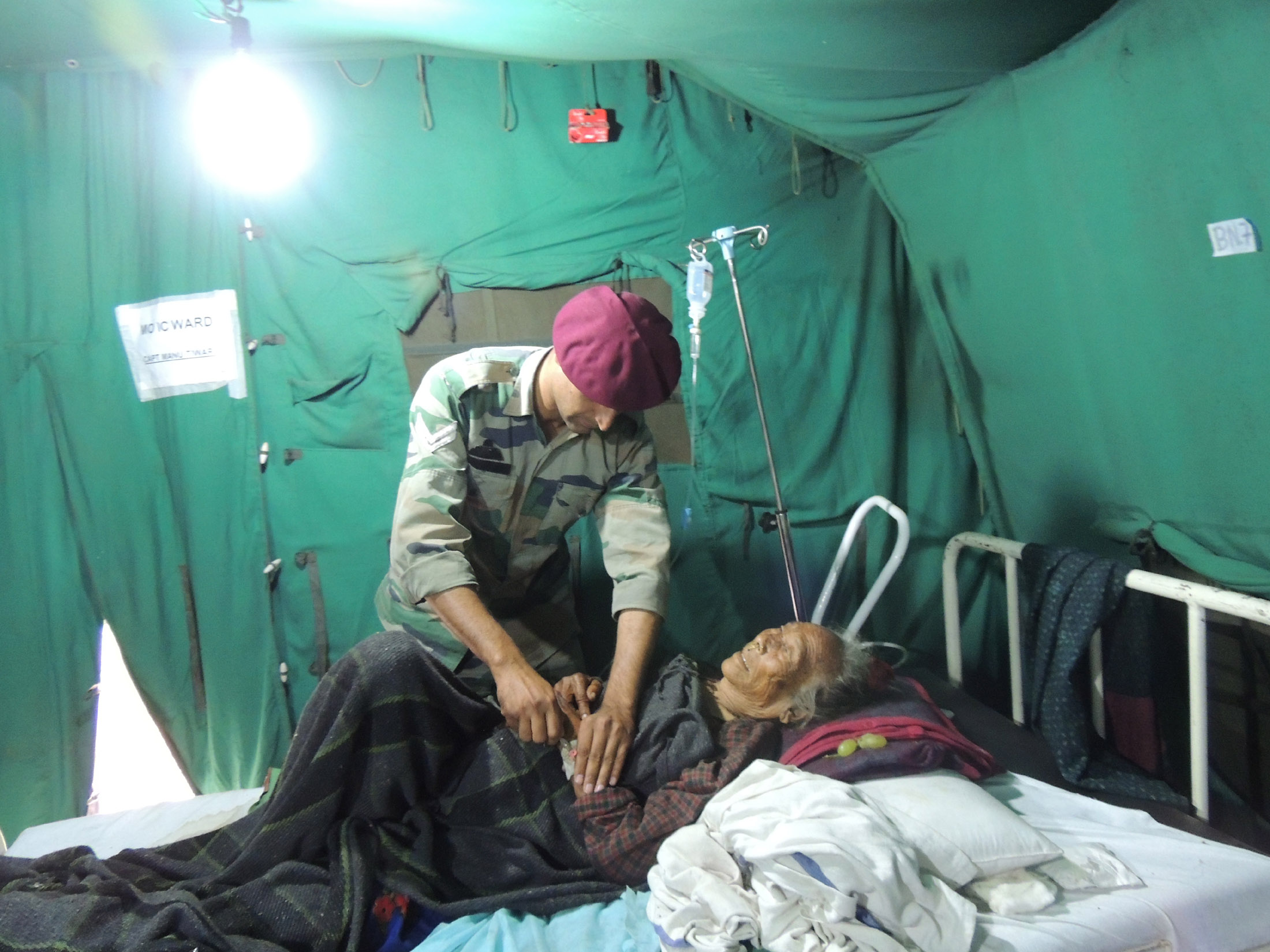
A senior citizen being treated at a hospital in Kathmandu

For the elderly population of 2.1 million (2011 census), only 3 registered geriatric specialists are available. Nepal not only lacks geriatric specialists, but geriatric nurses and caregivers are also lacking.

==== Health in the context of old age homes ====
Official data of the Social Welfare Council shows that the total number of old age homes (OAHs) registered as of 2005 was 153. However, most of these homes either do not exist today or operate in very poor condition. At present, about 70 registered old age homes (OAH) are available in the country out of which 11 get government grants. There are about 1500 elderly residing in these institutions.

In a case study which included three elderly homes in Kathmandu, it was found that over 50% of the residents were diagnosed with at least one health problem. Gastritis, hypertension, arthritis and infections were the most common diseases. Females suffered more compared to male in general. Prevalence of diseases was common mostly among the residents aged 70–79 years. Some basic facilities such as sick room, routine investigations, and geriatric rehabilitation were also not available. Recreational activities were infrequent and meals were not served according to the health condition of residents.

Another study that was done among the elderly of private and government old age homes concluded that the elderly people living in the private old age homes have better health status than the government old age homes despite the minimum amenities available. The elderly in government old homes suffered more with endemic diseases than private old age homes. Following the healthy habits and the clean dwelling surroundings of the private old homes had led to their better health compared to government old age homes. Major health problems of elderly living in government OAH were joint pain (73.5%), backache (60.7%), insomnia (39.3%), loss of appetite (36.8%), cough (50.4%), constipation (14.5%), tiredness (24.8%), stomach ache (33.3%) and allergy (18.8%). Similarly, major health problems of elderly living in private OAH were joint pain (69.0%), backache (53.5%), insomnia (18.3%), loss of appetite (18.3%), cough (18.3%), constipation (5.6%), tiredness (4.2%), stomach ache (23.9%) and allergy (9.9%).

Health status of elderly in OAH
| Diseases | Government(%) | Private(%) |
|---|---|---|
| High blood pressure | 24.8 | 26.8 |
| Heart disease | 5.1 | 5.6 |
| Chest problem | 17.1 | 15.5 |
| Asthma | 39.3 | 26.8 |
| Sugar | 6.0 | 15.5 |
| Urinary disorders | 6.8 | 7.0 |
| Uric acid | 7.7 | 15.5 |
| Joint ache | 73.5 | 69.0 |
| Insomnia | 39.3 | 18.3 |
| Loss of appetite | 36.8 | 18.3 |
| Cough | 50.4 | 18.3 |
| Backache | 60.7 | 53.5 |
| Constipation | 14.5 | 5.6 |
| Diarrhea | 6.0 | 4.2 |
| Tiredness | 24.8 | 4.2 |
| Stomach ache | 33.3 | 23.9 |
| Teeth problem | 69.2 | 52.1 |
| Eye problem | 78.6 | 63.4 |
| Ear problem | 51.3 | 45.1 |
| Gastritis | 50.4 | 59.2 |
| Allergy | 18.8 | 9.9 |

This study points out that OAHs seek the attention of government and concerned organizations for bringing the rules, policies and checklist for elderly homes on elderly facilities and welfare.

==== Government initiatives ====
Government has initiated to provide geriatric care services by formulating certain plans and policies but these have not been quite effective due to lack of resources. Madrid Plan of Action on Aging (2002), Senior Citizen Policy (2002), National Plan of Action on Aging (2005), Senior Citizen Act (2006) and The senior Citizens regulations (2008) are the initiatives taken by Nepal government.

Nepal has introduced a non-contributory social pension scheme since 1994/95 to ensure the social security to the elderly citizens. This system is unique to Asia being the primary universal pension scheme in the region and a model for other developing countries. The primary motive behind this scheme is to promote long established tradition of taking care of elderly by their family. At present, senior citizens above 65 years are entitled to receive Rs 4,000 in monthly social security allowance.

Currently, there are 12 hospitals with geriatric wards. The government has decided to establish geriatric wards in four more hospitals across the country this fiscal (2077/78). According to the Ministry of Health and Population, geriatric wards will be set up in Mechi Hospital, Janakpur Hospital, Hetauda Hospital and Karnali Province Hospital. The ministry has decided to extend the services in the hospitals having more than 100-bed capacity. Though the government has directed hospitals to give health services to the elderly population from a separate geriatric ward, many hospitals do not have separate wards for the elderly. Bir Hospital has been providing services to patients from its general wards and cabins. "We have not been able to allocate a separate ward for elderly people. We have been admitting them to the general ward or at times to the cabin as per the situation," said Dr Kedar Century, director at Bir Hospital. Also, the hospital has not been able to spend budget allocated for geriatric services. About 45 patients visit the geriatric OPD daily in the hospital, said Dr Century. The Ministry of Health and Population in 2077 (BS) has endorsed a guideline for Geriatrics (Senior Citizens) Health Service Program Implementation. It provides 50 percent discount for senior citizens (aged 60 years+) in certain health services as prescribed by hospital management.

==== Conclusion ====
The 2030 Agenda for Sustainable Development sets out a universal plan of action to achieve sustainable development in a uniform manner and aspires to realize the human rights of all people. It calls for ensuring that the Sustainable Development Goals (SDGs) are met for every component of the society, at all ages, with a discreet focus on the most vulnerable population group, which includes the elderly. Sadly, in the context of Nepal, specific and exact data related to geriatric population is lacking behind as this area is not emphasized as much as child and women health. More research and explorations need to be conducted from the public level to get a better scenario of geriatrics to develop effective and equitable health policies for the elderly.

Looking at the data from the old age homes in terms of geriatric health, it is recommended that the government should formulate and regulate policies for elderly to live together with their family, with the provision of incentives and consequences respectively. Since the percentage of geriatric health disorders contributing to GBD is higher in low-income countries like Nepal, there is a dire need to address the health issues of elderly to enhance and maintain their health and well-being as they are an integral part of the nation.

=== Road traffic accidents ===
Road traffic injuries are one of the global health burdens, an eighth leading cause of death worldwide. Globally, approximately 1.25 million lives are cut short every year because of a road traffic injuries. Ranging from 20 to 50 million people become victims of non-fatal injuries, with many acquiring a disability for the rest of the life as a result of their injury. In Nepal, a road traffic accident rank eighth among killer causes of disability-adjusted life years and also eighth among premature cause of death after Non-Communicable Diseases and Communicable Diseases.

A substantial problem of road traffic accident with fatalities occurs mainly on highways caused by bus crashes in Nepal. Due to the country's geography, bus accidents mostly happen in the hilly region and along the long-distance route causing 31 percent of fatalities and serious injuries every year. Accidents involving motorcycles, micro-buses, cars etc. highly prevail in the capital city, Kathmandu compared to other cities and lowland areas. The number of Road Traffic Accidents in the capital city was (53.5±14.1) of the number for the entire country. People between 15 and 40 ages are the most affected group followed by those above 50 years and majorities were male making 73 percent of disability-adjusted life years. The number of registered vehicles in Bagmati Zone was 129,557, a 29.6 percent of the whole nation in fiscal year 2017/2018.

The table below shows the trend of fatality per 10000 vehicles between 2005 and 2013.

| Year | Accidents | Fatalities | Total Vehicles | Fatality per 10000 vehicles |
|---|---|---|---|---|
| 2005-6 | 3894 | 825 | 536443 | 15.38 |
| 2006-7 | 4546 | 953 | 625179 | 15.24 |
| 2007-8 | 6821 | 1131 | 710917 | 15.91 |
| 2008-9 | 8353 | 1356 | 813487 | 16.67 |
| 2009–10 | 11747 | 1734 | 1015271 | 17.08 |
| 2010–11 | 140131 | 1689 | 1175824 | 14.36 |
| 2011–12 | 14291 | 1837 | 1342927 | 13.68 |
| 2012–13 | 13582 | 1816 | 1545988 | 11.75 |

source: Traffic Accidents Record, Traffic Directorate, Nepal Police, 2013.

=== Mental health ===
In terms of the network of mental health facilities, there are 18 outpatient mental health facilities, 3-day treatment facilities, and 17 community-based psychiatric inpatient units available in the country. The majority of the mental health service users are treated in outpatient facilities. Thirty-seven percent of patients are female. The patients admitted to mental hospitals belong primarily to the following two diagnostic groups: Schizophrenia, schizotypal and delusional disorders (34%) and Mood [affective] disorders (21%). On average, patients spend 18.85 days in mental hospitals. All of the patients spent less than one year in the mental hospital during the year of assessment.

Two percent of the training for medical doctors is devoted to mental health, and the same percentage is provided for nurses. One Non Government Organization is running a community mental health service in 7 of the 75 districts in the country. In other districts, community mental health services are not available, as mental health services are not yet integrated into the general health service system.

Even though Nepal's mental health policy was formulated in 1996, there is no mental health legislation as yet. In terms of financing, less than one percent (0.17%) of health care expenditures by the government are directed towards mental health. There is no human right review body to inspect mental health facilities and impose sanctions on those facilities that persistently violate patients' rights.

Mental health is one of the least addressed healthcare topics in Nepal in terms of both awareness and treatment. Many people choose to visit traditional healers first before seeking out psychiatrists. The lack of psychiatrists in Nepal along with the rise in psychiatric cases can make hospitals very crowded, which makes it harder for patients to receive adequate care.

Only few number of trained psychologists are working either in private clinic or very few in government hospitals. Most of the psychologists are working within Kathmandu Valley only.

== Antimicrobial resistance in Nepal ==
Antimicrobial Resistance (AMR) occurs when bacteria, viruses, fungi and parasites change over time and no longer respond to medicines making infections harder to treat and increasing the risk of disease spread, severe illness and death.

In September 2011, ministers of the South East Asian countries met in Jaipur India, recognized antimicrobial resistance as a major global public health issue and expressed commitment for establishment of a coherent, comprehensive and integrated national approach to combat antimicrobial resistance.

The Nepalese government has developed a National Antimicrobial Resistance Containment Action Plan as part of its ongoing commitment to the Jaipur Declaration to combat the threat of antimicrobial resistance. This Framework will be a starting point for all those who are responsible for action on antimicrobial resistance. Given the global nature of this issue, the Action Plan emphasizes the importance of Nepal collaborating with international organizations in accordance with the one-health concept.

The WHO report which was published in 2014 included data from Nepal on antibiotic resistance rates for six combinations of bacterial pathogens and antibiotics. The bacteria were E. coli, S. aureus, non-typhoidal Salmonella, Shigella spp., K. pneumoniae, and N. gonorrhoeae. Out of 140 isolates included, 64 percent of E. coli isolates were resistant to fluoroquinolones and 38 percent were resistant to third-generation cephalosporins. Smaller data sets showed MRSA ranging from 2 to 69 percent. K. pneumoniae showed resistance to third-generation cephalosporins of 0 to 48 percent, while no resistance to carbapenems was detected.

=== National AMR surveillance system ===
The national surveillance system includes 41 surveillance sites. There are 20 hospitals, 1 outpatient facility, and 20 in-outpatient facilities. The program has grown to include a network of 21 laboratories covering all five regions of the country, and it has now expanded to include eight pathogens of interest, namely Salmonella species, Shigella species, Vibrio cholerae, Streptococcus pneumoniae, Neisseria gonorrhoeae, Haemophilus influenzae type b, extended spectrum beta lactamase (ESBL) producing E. coli and methicillin resistant Staphylococcus aureus (MRSA).

Table showing Antibiotic resistance in various microorganisms
| Microorganisms | Study area at hospital | No of isolates | Antibiotics | Resistance(%) |
| E. coli(ESBL)* | National Kidney Center, Vanasthali, Kathmandu | 18 | Cefotaxime | 100 |
| E. coli(ESBL)* | National Kidney Center, Vanasthali, Kathmandu | 18 | Ceftazidime | 100 |
| E. coli(ESBL)* | National Kidney Center, Vanasthali, Kathmandu | 18 | Ceftriaxone | 100 |
| E. coli(ESBL)* | National Kidney Center, Vanasthali, Kathmandu | 18 | Cefixime | 94.44 |
| E. coli(ESBL)* | National Kidney Center, Vanasthali, Kathmandu | 18 | Cefalexin | 94.44 |
| E. coli(ESBL)* | National Kidney Center, Vanasthali, Kathmandu | 18 | Nalidixic acid | 94.44 |
| E. coli(ESBL)* | National Kidney Center, Vanasthali, Kathmandu | 18 | Norfloxacin | 94.44 |
| E. coli(ESBL)* | National Kidney Center, Vanasthali, Kathmandu | 18 | Ofloxacin | 88.89 |
| E. coli(ESBL)* | National Kidney Center, Vanasthali, Kathmandu | 18 | Ciprofloxacin | 88.89 |
| E. coli(ESBL)* | National Kidney Center, Vanasthali, Kathmandu | 18 | Doxycycline | 72.22 |
| E. coli(ESBL)* | National Kidney Center, Vanasthali, Kathmandu | 18 | Cotrimoxazole | 61.11 |
| E. coli(ESBL)* | National Kidney Center, Vanasthali, Kathmandu | 18 | Nitrofurantoin | 27.78 |
| E. coli(ESBL)* | National Kidney Center, Vanasthali, Kathmandu | 18 | Amikacin | 0 |
| E. coli(ESBL) | Manmohan medical college and teaching hospital | 288 | Ampicillin | 100 |
| E. coli(ESBL) | Manmohan medical college and teaching hospital | 288 | Amoxicilin | 100 |
| E. coli(ESBL) | Manmohan medical college and teaching hospital | 288 | Cefixime | 100 |
| E. coli(ESBL) | Manmohan medical college and teaching hospital | 288 | Ceftazidime | 100 |
| E. coli(ESBL) | Manmohan medical college and teaching hospital | 288 | Ceftriaxone | 100 |
| E. coli(ESBL) | Manmohan medical college and teaching hospital | 288 | Aztreonam | 100 |
| E. coli(ESBL) | Manmohan medical college and teaching hospital | 288 | Cephalexin | 92 |
| E. coli(ESBL) | Manmohan medical college and teaching hospital | 288 | Ciprofloxacin | 78 |
| E. coli(ESBL) | Manmohan medical college and teaching hospital | 288 | Tigecycline | 0 |
| E. coli(ESBL) | Manmohan medical college and teaching hospital | 288 | Colistin | 0 |
| E.coli (MDR) | Manmohan medical college and teaching hospital | 480 | Ampicillin | 100 |
| E.coli (MDR) | Manmohan medical college and teaching hospital | 480 | Amoxicilin | 84.7 |
| E.coli (MDR) | Manmohan medical college and teaching hospital | 480 | Cephalexin | 81.6 |
| E.coli (MDR) | Manmohan medical college and teaching hospital | 480 | Ciprofloxacin | 80.6 |
| E.coli (MDR) | Manmohan medical college and teaching hospital | 480 | Cefixime | 65 |
| E.coli (MDR) | Manmohan medical college and teaching hospital | 480 | Ceftazidime | 64 |
| E.coli (MDR) | Manmohan medical college and teaching hospital | 480 | Aztreonam | 61 |
| E.coli (MDR) | Manmohan medical college and teaching hospital | 480 | Levofloxacin | 51 |
| E.coli (MDR) | Manmohan medical college and teaching hospital | 480 | Cotrimoxazole | 33 |
| E.coli (MDR) | Manmohan medical college and teaching hospital | 480 | Tigecycline | 0 |
| E.coli (MDR) | Manmohan medical college and teaching hospital | 480 | Colistin | 0 |
| Shigella flexneri | Nepalgunj Medical College and Teaching Hospital | 29 | Ampicillin | 96.55 |
| Shigella flexneri | Nepalgunj Medical College and Teaching Hospital | 29 | Nalidixic acid | 96.55 |
| Shigella flexneri | Nepalgunj Medical College and Teaching Hospital | 29 | Cotrimoxazole | 72.41 |
| Shigella flexneri | Nepalgunj Medical College and Teaching Hospital | 29 | Ciprofloxacin | 62.07 |
| Shigella flexneri | Nepalgunj Medical College and Teaching Hospital | 29 | Ceftazidime | 44.83 |
| Shigella flexneri | Nepalgunj Medical College and Teaching Hospital | 29 | Ofloxacin | 37.93 |
| Shigella flexneri | Nepalgunj Medical College and Teaching Hospital | 29 | Ceftriaxone | 34.48 |
| Shigella dysenteriae | Nepalgunj Medical College and Teaching Hospital | 19 | Nalidixic acid | 94.74 |
| Shigella dysenteriae | Nepalgunj Medical College and Teaching Hospital | 19 | Cotrimoxazole | 84.21 |
| Shigella dysenteriae | Nepalgunj Medical College and Teaching Hospital | 19 | Ampicillin | 73.68 |
| Shigella dysenteriae | Nepalgunj Medical College and Teaching Hospital | 19 | Ciprofloxacin | 68.42 |
| Shigella dysenteriae | Nepalgunj Medical College and Teaching Hospital | 19 | Gentamicin | 36.84 |
| Shigella dysenteriae | Nepalgunj Medical College and Teaching Hospital | 19 | Ofloxacin | 21.05 |
| Shigella boydii | Nepalgunj Medical College and Teaching Hospital | 15 | Cotrimoxazole | 100 |
| Shigella boydii | Nepalgunj Medical College and Teaching Hospital | 15 | Nalidixic acid | 100 |
| Shigella boydii | Nepalgunj Medical College and Teaching Hospital | 15 | Ampicillin | 73.33 |
| Shigella boydii | Nepalgunj Medical College and Teaching Hospital | 15 | Gentamicin | 33.33 |
| Shigella boydii | Nepalgunj Medical College and Teaching Hospital | 15 | Cefotaxime | 26.67 |
| shigella sonnei | Nepalgunj Medical College and Teaching Hospital | 6 | Ampicillin | 100 |
| shigella sonnei | Nepalgunj Medical College and Teaching Hospital | 6 | Nalidixic acid | 83.33 |
| shigella sonnei | Nepalgunj Medical College and Teaching Hospital | 6 | Cotrimoxazole | 83.33 |
| shigella sonnei | Nepalgunj Medical College and Teaching Hospital | 6 | Ciprofloxacin | 33.33 |
| Shigella spp. | National Public Health Laboratory, Kathmandu | 21 | Ampicillin | 71.42 |
| Shigella spp. | National Public Health Laboratory, Kathmandu | 21 | Cotrimoxazole | 66.66 |
| Shigella spp. | National Public Health Laboratory, Kathmandu | 21 | mecillinam | 61.9 |
| Shigella spp. | National Public Health Laboratory, Kathmandu | 21 | Nalidixic acid | 47.62 |
| Shigella spp. | National Public Health Laboratory, Kathmandu | 21 | Ciprofloxacin | 23.8 |
| Salmonella spp. | National Public Health Laboratory, Kathmandu | 9 | Nalidixic acid | 44.44 |
| Salmonella spp. | National Public Health Laboratory, Kathmandu | 9 | Ampicillin | 33.33 |
| Salmonella spp. | National Public Health Laboratory, Kathmandu | 9 | Chloramphenicol | 33.33 |
| Salmonella spp. | National Public Health Laboratory, Kathmandu | 9 | Cotrimoxazole | 33.33 |
| Shigella flexnari | Tribhuwan University Teaching Hospital (TUTH), Kathmandu | 12 | Amoxicilin | 83.33 |
| Shigella flexnari | Tribhuwan University Teaching Hospital (TUTH), Kathmandu | 12 | Ampicillin | 66.66 |
| Shigella flexnari | Tribhuwan University Teaching Hospital (TUTH), Kathmandu | 12 | Tetracycline | 66.66 |
| Shigella flexnari | Tribhuwan University Teaching Hospital (TUTH), Kathmandu | 12 | Cotrimoxazole | 58.33 |
| Shigella flexnari | Tribhuwan University Teaching Hospital (TUTH), Kathmandu | 12 | Ciprofloxacin | 58.33 |
| Shigella flexnari | Tribhuwan University Teaching Hospital (TUTH), Kathmandu | 12 | Azithromycin | 33.33 |
| Shigella flexnari | Tribhuwan University Teaching Hospital (TUTH), Kathmandu | 12 | Ceftazidime | 8.33 |
| Shigella sonnei | Tribhuwan University Teaching Hospital (TUTH), Kathmandu | 3 | Nalidixic acid | 100 |
| Shigella sonnei | Tribhuwan University Teaching Hospital (TUTH), Kathmandu | 3 | Cotrimoxazole | 100 |
| Shigella sonnei | Tribhuwan University Teaching Hospital (TUTH), Kathmandu | 3 | Ciprofloxacin | 100 |
| Shigella flexnari | Tribhuwan University Teaching Hospital (TUTH), Kathmandu | 12 | Amoxicilin | 83.33 |
| Shigella flexnari | Tribhuwan University Teaching Hospital (TUTH), Kathmandu | 12 | Ampicillin | 66.66 |
| Shigella flexnari | Tribhuwan University Teaching Hospital (TUTH), Kathmandu | 12 | Tetracycline | 66.66 |
| Shigella flexnari | Tribhuwan University Teaching Hospital (TUTH), Kathmandu | 12 | Cotrimoxazole | 58.33 |
| Shigella flexnari | Tribhuwan University Teaching Hospital (TUTH), Kathmandu | 12 | Ciprofloxacin | 58.33 |
| Shigella flexnari | Tribhuwan University Teaching Hospital (TUTH), Kathmandu | 12 | Azithromycin | 33.33 |
| Shigella flexnari | Tribhuwan University Teaching Hospital (TUTH), Kathmandu | 12 | Ceftazidime | 8.33 |
| Salmonella typhi | Alka Hospital, Jawalakhel | 56 | Nalidixic acid | 91.1 |
| Salmonella typhi | Alka Hospital, Jawalakhel | 56 | Ampicillin | 1.8 |
| Salmonella Paratyphi A | Alka Hospital, Jawalakhel | 30 | Nalidixic acid | 90 |
| Salmonella Paratyphi A | Alka Hospital, Jawalakhel | 30 | Chloramphenicol | 3.3 |
| Salmonella Paratyphi A | Alka Hospital, Jawalakhel | 30 | Ciprofloxacin | 3.3 |
| Salmonella spp. | Kathmandu Model Hospital, Kathmandu | 83 | Nalidixic acid | 83.1 |
| Salmonella spp. | Kathmandu Model Hospital, Kathmandu | 83 | Ciprofloxacin | 3.6 |
| Salmonella spp. | Kathmandu Model Hospital, Kathmandu | 83 | Ampicillin | 2.4 |
| Salmonella spp. | Kathmandu Model Hospital, Kathmandu | 83 | Cotrimoxazole | 1.2 |
| Salmonella spp. | Kathmandu Model Hospital, Kathmandu | 83 | Chloramphenicol | 1.2 |
| Vibrio cholarae (Clinical isolate) | Kathmandu City | 22 | Ampicillin | 100 |
| Vibrio cholarae (Clinical isolate) | Kathmandu City | 22 | Nalidixic acid | 100 |
| Vibrio cholarae (Clinical isolate) | Kathmandu City | 22 | Cotrimoxazole | 100 |
| Vibrio cholarae (Clinical isolate) | Kathmandu City | 22 | Erythromycin | 90.9 |
| Vibrio cholarae (Clinical isolate) | Kathmandu City | 22 | Cefotaxime | 18.2 |
| Vibrio cholarae (Clinical isolate) | Kathmandu City | 22 | Chloramphenicol | 9.1 |
| Vibrio cholarae (Clinical isolate) | Kathmandu City | 22 | Ciprofloxacin | 9.1 |
| Vibrio cholarae (Environmental isolate) | Kathmandu City | 2 | Ampicillin | 100 |
| Vibrio cholarae (Environmental isolate) | Kathmandu City | 2 | Nalidixic acid | 100 |
| Vibrio cholarae (Environmental isolate) | Kathmandu City | 2 | Cotrimoxazole | 100 |
| Vibrio cholarae (Environmental isolate) | Kathmandu City | 2 | Erythromycin | 100 |
| Vibrio cholarae (Environmental isolate) | Kathmandu City | 2 | Chloramphenicol | 50 |
| Vibrio cholarae | National Public Health Laboratory, Kathamandu | 31 | Ampicillin | 100 |
| Vibrio cholarae | National Public Health Laboratory, Kathamandu | 31 | Cotrimoxazole | 100 |
| Vibrio cholarae | National Public Health Laboratory, Kathamandu | 31 | Ciprofloxacin | 6.45 |
| Vibrio cholarae | National Public Health Laboratory, Kathamandu | 31 | Chloramphenicol | 3.23 |
| Vibrio cholarae | National Public Health Laboratory, Kathamandu | 57 | Nalidixic acid | 100 |
| Vibrio cholarae | National Public Health Laboratory, Kathamandu | 57 | Cotrimoxazole | 100 |
| Vibrio cholarae | National Public Health Laboratory, Kathamandu | 57 | Furazolidone | 100 |
| Vibrio cholarae | National Public Health Laboratory, Kathamandu | 57 | Erythromycin | 32 |
| Vibrio cholarae | National Public Health Laboratory, Kathamandu | 57 | Ampicillin | 26 |
| S. aureus | Chitwan Medical College Teaching Hospital, Chitwan | 306 | Penicillin | 94.7 |
| S. aureus | Chitwan Medical College Teaching Hospital, Chitwan | 306 | Cotrimoxazole | 81.7 |
| S. aureus | Chitwan Medical College Teaching Hospital, Chitwan | 306 | Cephalexin | 68 |
| S. aureus | Chitwan Medical College Teaching Hospital, Chitwan | 306 | Gentamicin | 60.4 |
| S. aureus | Chitwan Medical College Teaching Hospital, Chitwan | 306 | Ciprofloxacin | 63.7 |
| S. aureus | Chitwan Medical College Teaching Hospital, Chitwan | 306 | Erythromycin | 32.7 |
| S. aureus | Chitwan Medical College Teaching Hospital, Chitwan | 306 | Cefoxitin | 43.1 |
| S. aureus | Chitwan Medical College Teaching Hospital, Chitwan | 306 | Oxacillin | 39.2 |
| S. aureus | Chitwan Medical College Teaching Hospital, Chitwan | 306 | Clindamycin | 27.5 |
| S. aureus | Chitwan Medical College Teaching Hospital, Chitwan | 306 | Amikacin | 10.7 |
| S. aureus | Chitwan Medical College Teaching Hospital, Chitwan | 306 | Vancomycin | 0 |
| S. aureus | Chitwan Medical College Teaching Hospital, Chitwan | 306 | Teicoplanin | 0 |
| S. aureus | Universal College of Medical Sciences Teaching Hospital, Bhairahawa | 162 | Penicillin | 81.5 |
| S. aureus | Universal College of Medical Sciences Teaching Hospital, Bhairahawa | 162 | Erythromycin | 71.7 |
| S. aureus | Universal College of Medical Sciences Teaching Hospital, Bhairahawa | 162 | Ampicillin | 87.4 |
| S. aureus | Universal College of Medical Sciences Teaching Hospital, Bhairahawa | 162 | Amoxicilin | 91.9 |
| S. aureus | Universal College of Medical Sciences Teaching Hospital, Bhairahawa | 162 | Tetracycline | 39.6 |
| S. aureus | Universal College of Medical Sciences Teaching Hospital, Bhairahawa | 162 | Ciprofloxacin | 26.5 |
| S. aureus | Universal College of Medical Sciences Teaching Hospital, Bhairahawa | 162 | Amikacin | 19 |
| S. aureus | Universal College of Medical Sciences Teaching Hospital, Bhairahawa | 162 | Cloxacillin | 69.1 |
| S. aureus | Universal College of Medical Sciences Teaching Hospital, Bhairahawa | 162 | Vancomycin | 0 |
| MRSA | Universal College of Medical Sciences Teaching Hospital, Bhairahawa | 112 | Penicillin | 100 |
| MRSA | Universal College of Medical Sciences Teaching Hospital, Bhairahawa | 112 | Cloxacillin | 100 |
| MRSA | Universal College of Medical Sciences Teaching Hospital, Bhairahawa | 112 | Amoxicilin | 91.8 |
| MRSA | Universal College of Medical Sciences Teaching Hospital, Bhairahawa | 112 | Ampicillin | 90 |
| MRSA | Universal College of Medical Sciences Teaching Hospital, Bhairahawa | 112 | Erythromycin | 68.7 |
| MRSA | Universal College of Medical Sciences Teaching Hospital, Bhairahawa | 112 | Cephalexin | 66.03 |
| MRSA | Universal College of Medical Sciences Teaching Hospital, Bhairahawa | 112 | Cefazoline | 57.6 |
| MRSA | Universal College of Medical Sciences Teaching Hospital, Bhairahawa | 112 | Vancomycin | 0 |
| MRSA | Kathmandu Medical College Teaching Hospital, Kathmandu | 29 | Penicillin | 100 |
| MRSA | Kathmandu Medical College Teaching Hospital, Kathmandu | 29 | Oxacillin | 100 |
| MRSA | Kathmandu Medical College Teaching Hospital, Kathmandu | 29 | Cephalexin | 75.86 |
| MRSA | Kathmandu Medical College Teaching Hospital, Kathmandu | 29 | Cotrimoxazole | 44.82 |
| MRSA | Kathmandu Medical College Teaching Hospital, Kathmandu | 29 | Erythromycin | 44.82 |
| MRSA | Kathmandu Medical College Teaching Hospital, Kathmandu | 29 | Tetracycline | 20.68 |
| MRSA | Kathmandu Medical College Teaching Hospital, Kathmandu | 29 | Gentamicin | 20.68 |
| MRSA | Kathmandu Medical College Teaching Hospital, Kathmandu | 29 | Amikacin | 24.13 |
| MRSA | Kathmandu Medical College Teaching Hospital, Kathmandu | 29 | Ciprofloxacin | 17.03 |
| MRSA | Kathmandu Medical College Teaching Hospital, Kathmandu | 29 | Vancomycin | 0 |
| Pseudomonas aeruginosa | Tribhuwan University teaching Hospital (TUTH) | 24 | Ceftazidime | 91.6 |
| Pseudomonas aeruginosa | Tribhuwan University teaching Hospital (TUTH) | 24 | Ciprofloxacin | 95.8 |
| Pseudomonas aeruginosa | Tribhuwan University teaching Hospital (TUTH) | 24 | Levofloxacin | 87.5 |
| Pseudomonas aeruginosa | Tribhuwan University teaching Hospital (TUTH) | 24 | Imipenem | 62.5 |
| Pseudomonas aeruginosa | Tribhuwan University teaching Hospital (TUTH) | 24 | Gentamicin | 62.5 |
| Pseudomonas aeruginosa | Tribhuwan University teaching Hospital (TUTH) | 24 | Cotrimoxazole | 0 |
| Pseudomonas aeruginosa | Tribhuwan University teaching Hospital (TUTH) | 24 | Tigecycline | 0 |
| Klebsiella spp. | Tribhuwan University teaching Hospital (TUTH) | 37 | Cefotaxime | 100 |
| Klebsiella spp. | Tribhuwan University teaching Hospital (TUTH) | 37 | Cefepime | 100 |
| Klebsiella spp. | Tribhuwan University teaching Hospital (TUTH) | 37 | Cotrimoxazole | 100 |
| Klebsiella spp. | Tribhuwan University teaching Hospital (TUTH) | 37 | Ciprofloxacin | 86.4 |
| Klebsiella spp. | Tribhuwan University teaching Hospital (TUTH) | 37 | Gentamicin | 83.7 |
| Klebsiella spp. | Tribhuwan University teaching Hospital (TUTH) | 37 | Levofloxacin | 72.9 |
| Klebsiella spp. | Tribhuwan University teaching Hospital (TUTH) | 37 | Penicillin | 3.57 |
| Klebsiella spp. | Tribhuwan University teaching Hospital (TUTH) | 37 | Tigecycline | 0 |
| Streprococcus pneumoniae | Kanti Children's Hospital, Kathmandu | 22 | Cotrimoxazole | 67.86 |
| Streprococcus pneumoniae | Kanti Children's Hospital, Kathmandu | 22 | Erythromycin | 7.14 |
| Streprococcus pneumoniae | Kanti Children's Hospital, Kathmandu | 22 | Cefotaxime | 3.57 |
| K. pneumoniae | Kanti Children's Hospital, Kathmandu | 36 | Penicillin | 88.89 |
| K. pneumoniae | Kanti Children's Hospital, Kathmandu | 36 | Ampicillin | 44.44 |
| K. pneumoniae | Kanti Children's Hospital, Kathmandu | 36 | Gentamicin | 69.44 |
| K. pneumoniae | Kanti Children's Hospital, Kathmandu | 36 | Ciprofloxacin | 22.22 |
| K. pneumoniae | Kanti Children's Hospital, Kathmandu | 36 | Chloramphenicol | 47.22 |
| K. pneumoniae | Kanti Children's Hospital, Kathmandu | 36 | Erythromycin | 30.56 |
| K. pneumoniae | Kanti Children's Hospital, Kathmandu | 36 | Tetracycline | 52.78 |
| K. pneumoniae | Kanti Children's Hospital, Kathmandu | 36 | Cotrimoxazole | 52.78 |
| S. pneumoniae | Mid and far western region, Nepal | 30 | Ampicillin | 56.67 |
| S. pneumoniae | Mid and far western region, Nepal | 30 | Cotrimoxazole | 63.33 |
| S. pneumoniae | Mid and far western region, Nepal | 30 | Penicillin | 90 |
| S. pneumoniae | Mid and far western region, Nepal | 30 | Chloramphenicol | 40 |
| S. pneumoniae | Mid and far western region, Nepal | 30 | Gentamicin | 13.33 |
| S. pneumoniae | Mid and far western region, Nepal | 30 | Erythromycin | 33.33 |
| S. pneumoniae | Mid and far western region, Nepal | 30 | Ceftriaxone | 0 |
| haemophilus influenzae | Mid and far western region, Nepal | 68 | Ampicillin | 54.41 |
| haemophilus influenzae | Mid and far western region, Nepal | 68 | Penicillin | 91.18 |
| haemophilus influenzae | Mid and far western region, Nepal | 68 | Cotrimoxazole | 47.06 |
| haemophilus influenzae | Mid and far western region, Nepal | 68 | Chloramphenicol | 32.35 |
| haemophilus influenzae | Mid and far western region, Nepal | 68 | Gentamicin | 16.18 |
| haemophilus influenzae | Mid and far western region, Nepal | 68 | Tetracycline | 41.18 |
| haemophilus influenzae | Mid and far western region, Nepal | 68 | Ciprofloxacin | 16.18 |

==== Prevention and control measures against Antimicrobial resistance ====
The Nepalese government must strictly implement a national AMR action plan. This should include strategies and policies

- A nationwide AMR surveillance program
- Raising awareness of AMR issues among producers and consumers, raising awareness among public and farmers on harmful effects of drugs to their bodies and hazards of development of antimicrobial resistance.
- Healthcare professionals should be trained on AMR issues.
- Users of antimicrobials need to be made aware of harmful effects of unnecessarily prescribed drugs and its effect on increase in problem of antibiotic resistance.
- There should be strong collaborative research on the development of strategies to minimize antimicrobial resistance either by optimal use of antibiotics or by other novel approaches.
- The educational system should include modules on antimicrobial resistance and reduce use of antimicrobials in hospitals and at community level as well as its use in agriculture. Promote good husbandry practices
- Antibiotic stewardship programs need to be implemented. Antimicrobial stewardship should be driven by public-private partnership approaches with government legislating, regulating and taking legal action on rationale use of antibiotics based on public interest.

== Health financing system in Nepal ==
As per the WHO, health financing mainly refers to the "function of a health system concerned with the mobilization, accumulation and allocation of money to cover the health needs of the people, individually and collectively, in the health system... the purpose of health financing is to make funding available, as well as to set the right financial incentives to providers, to ensure that all individuals have access to effective public health and personal health care". Health financing is one of the key function of the health system which can enable countries towards the path of universal health coverage by improvement in service coverage and financing protection. There are two related objectives in health financing, i.e. : to raise sufficient funds and to provide financial risk protection to the population. Moreover, in most cases these objectives can only be achieved if the available funds are used efficiently. Thus, efficiency is resource is usually taken as a third objective. As a result, the financing system is often divided conceptually into three inter-related functions – revenue collection, fund pooling, and purchasing/provision of services.

=== Key health expenditure information of Nepal ===
In 2018, per capita government expenditure on health was $57.85, about 1.7 times higher than that of low-income countries ($34.60) but 19 times less than the global average ($111.082).

The key health financing statistics of Nepal is summarised in the table below:

Health Financing Statistics of Nepal
| | 2000 | 2006 | 2012 | 2018 |
| Health Spending US$ per Capita (CHE) | 8.6 | 13.9 | 34.3 | 57.8 |
| Government health spending% Health spending (GGHE-D%CHE) | 15.5% | 23.9% | 17.5% | 25.0% |
| Out-of-pocket spending %Health spending (OOPS%CHE) | 55.8% | 42.5% | 56.1% | 50.8% |
| Priority to health (GGHE-D%GGE) | 4.3% | 7.6% | 4.7% | 4.6% |
| GDP US$ per capita | 239 | 345 | 664 | 990 |

=== Health financing trends ===
As of F.Y. 2020/21, the total budget allocated to fund the health sector health sector was 7.80%, which is significantly below the 15% target set by the Organization for African Unity's 2001 Abuja Declaration. Similar to most low-income countries, Nepal has a high proportion of out-of-pocket expenditure (OOP) spending and low proportion of public health spending in its total health expenditures. From 2013 till 2016, Out-of-pocket expenditure as a share of current health expenditure fell from 63 percent to 55 percent. However, Out-of-pocket payment (OOP) is still the principal source of health financing in Nepal. In 2018, out-of-pocket payments stood at almost 50% of the total current health expenditure in Nepal. This figure is slightly higher than the average figure for low-income countries at 43.41% but fairly higher in global terms (around 2.8 times). Also, this figure was well above the 20% limit suggested by the 2010 World Health Report to ensure that financial catastrophe and impoverishment become negligible as a result of accessing health.

The health sector of Nepal is heavily dependent on the foreign aid. Nearly about 50% of health budget is made up of international aid and external development partners have been involved in several health policy initiatives in Nepal.

=== Structure of heath financing ===
After the promulgation of the constitution in 2015, Nepal moved into a federal government system with three level of government: a federal level, seven provinces and 753 local government. Within these tiers, health services delivered by the Ministry of health and population (MOHP), the provinces and the municipalities are financed by taxes. Moreover, contributions made by the external donors also go into the provision of health services which are pooled into the public budget. Also, user fees paid as out-of-pocket expenditure when seeking health services in the peripheral levels complement the public funds. Contributions (as premiums) collected from the family members as well as the tax funds provision-financed by the Ministry of Finance (MOF) are the major source of revenues for health insurance in Nepal. Currently, the national HI scheme is in a gradual implementation process. As of 2020, the insurance scheme has a coverage of 58 districts and 563 local levels in the country. Next 19 districts are in pipeline for the expansion. As stated earlier, half of the financing in Nepal is not pooled because it directly comes in the form of out-of-pocket expenditure. Federal Divisible Fund (FDF) has been created for the fund-pooling mechanism. This is based on value added tax (TAX) and excise duties collected from domestic products. The central government gets around 70 percent of fund resources and 50 percent of the royalties collected from natural resource. As for the provincial and local government, financing comes from tax and non-tax revenues from the FDF. Part of the FDF received by the provincial and local government goes into financing the health services and varies based on the amount of budget allocation by each of these levels of government. Regarding the purchasing functions in Nepal, there is an existence of Basic Health Care Package (BHCP). This package consists of preventive care, clinical services, basic inpatient services, delivery services and the listed essential medicines. Nepal is starting to use some innovations on providers payment. Capitation-based payment for outpatient care is being used in public health insurance. Moreover, some other capacitation-based payments are in practice for the public programs such as safe motherhood program, BHCP, and free health care. Likewise, cash incentives is being used for the safe motherhood program as well and service reimbursement is being used by private insurances, Employees Provident Fund (EFP), Social Security Fund (SSF) and Impoverished Citizen's Service. The private health sector in Nepal, has a dominant presence consuming around 60% of the total health expenditure as of 2012. Private sectors dominate in providing curative care while predominantly private not-for profit sector provide preventive services in the Country. The public health system has acknowledged the presence in of the private sector in the country and recognizes that private sectors act a complement to the health system and not a substitute to the public sector.

== See also ==
- Gender inequality in Nepal
- LGBTQ rights in Nepal
