= Nepal Medical Association =

Nepal Medical Association (abbreviated N.M.A) is a non-profit national professional organization that represents medical and dental doctors in Nepal.

== Background ==
It was established on 4 March, 195 with only 20 members, and has since evolved into a large organization with more than ten thousand members. Siddhi Mani A. Dixit was the founder president of NMA, which is the first professional organization in the country.

NMA has been actively involved in the development of medical science and acts as a bridge between the government and medical professionals. The organization has been instrumental in publishing a medical journal on a monthly basis and organizing scientific sessions to keep medical professionals up-to-date with the latest advances in medical science. Additionally, NMA has contributed significantly to improving the health situation in the country by working for the common interests of the medical profession.

NMA is a member of the World Medical Association (WMA) and the Confederation of Medical Associations in Asia and Oceania (CMAAO), and is mutually affiliated with the Indian Medical Association. It is also a founding member of the South Asian Medical Association (SAMA).

NMA stands up for doctors individually and collectively on a wide range of employment issues and is recognized both nationally and locally. The current 28th NMA Executive, elected in February 2020, is led by Lochan Karki as the President and Badri Rijal as the General Secretary.
