= Tribhuvan University Teaching Hospital =

Hospital in Bagmati, Nepal

- Ministry of Health and Population (Nepal)
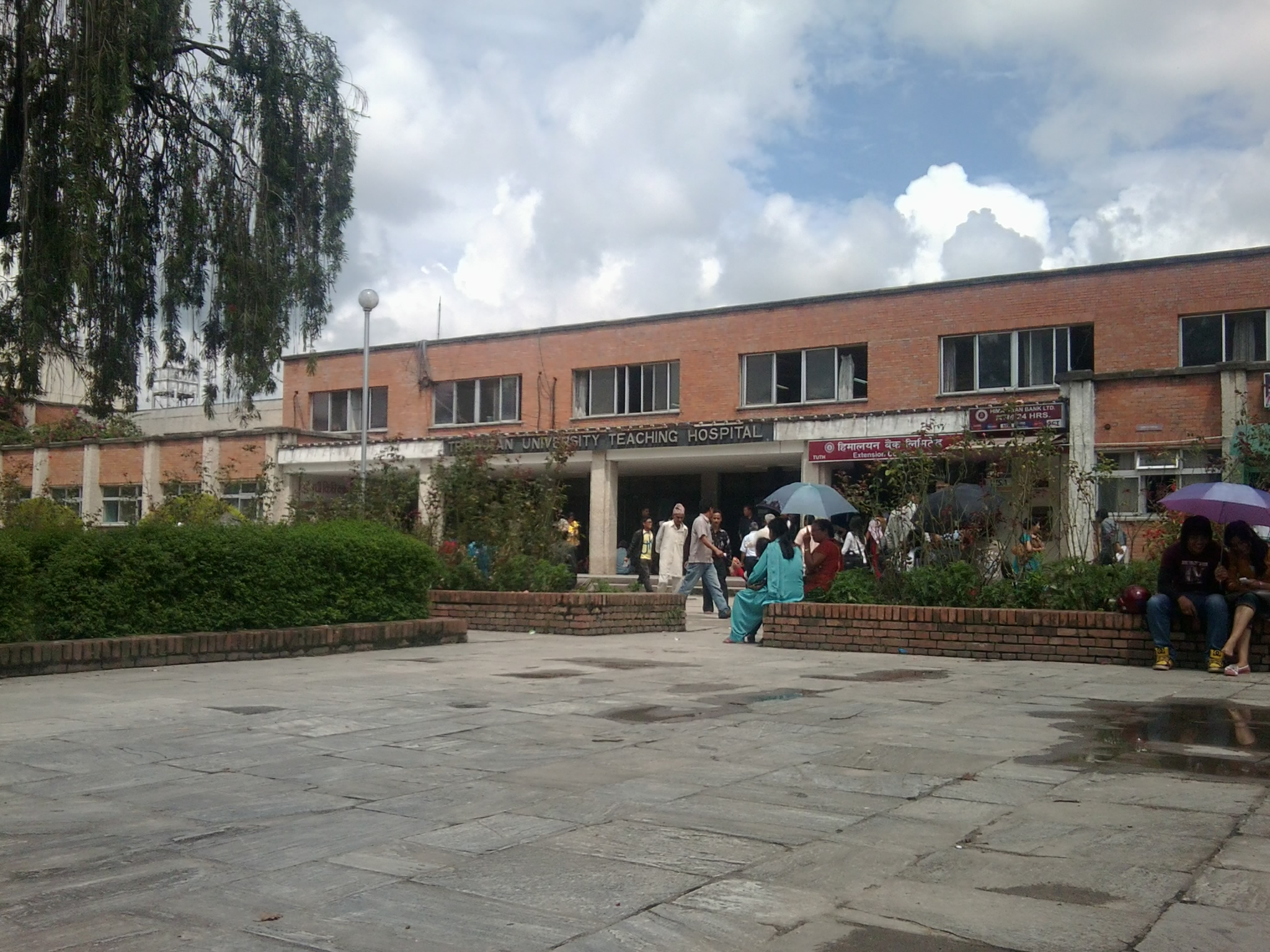
- Ticket counter of Teaching Hospital

Geography
- Location: Maharajgunj Rd, Kathmandu 44600, Bagmati Province, Nepal

Organisation
- Type: Community, Teaching
- Affiliated university: Tribhuvan University

Services
- Beds: 700

History
- Founded: 1982

Links
- Website: http://tuth.org.np/

Tribhuvan University Teaching Hospital (Nepali: त्रिवि शिक्षण अस्पताल) is a public hospital in Nepal. It was established in 1982. Initially, it had a 300 bed facility which has now increased and now it has a 700 bed facility.
The hospital is the centre for teaching clinical courses for undergraduate, postgraduate and specialization course as well as clinical research centre under Institute of Medicine (IOM) which is affiliated to Tribhuvan University. It provides highly specialised as well as general services to the patients coming from different parts of country as well as students from neighbouring countries like India, Pakistan, Bangladesh and Maldives, Shri Lanka as well as trainees from Europe and North America.

Following the 2026 Nepal floods, injured survivors and deceased bodies were transferred Tribhuvan University Teaching Hospital after hospitals and morgues in affected areas reached full capacity.

== Services ==
- General OPD (Out Patient Department)
- EHS (Extended Health Services)
- Emergency services
- In-patient service.

1. General OPD (Out Patient Department) The General Out-Patient Department (OPD) is the main entry point for non-emergency specialist consultations at Tribhuvan University Teaching Hospital. It operates Sunday to Thursday from 7:00 AM to 2:30 PM and on Fridays/public holidays from 7:00 AM to 11:30 AM (ticket issuance hours: Sun–Thu 7:00–11:00 AM & 1:00–2:30 PM; Fri 7:00–11:30 AM). Patients can obtain OPD tickets on-site or book appointments online and receive consultations across all major clinical departments.

2. EHS (Extended Health Services) Extended Health Services (EHS), also known as Extended Hospital Service or evening OPD, offers additional outpatient consultations beyond regular OPD hours. It runs Sunday to Thursday from 4:00 PM to 6:00 PM and on Fridays from 3:00 PM to 5:00 PM. This service is especially useful for working patients and those who miss morning timings, with many departments running dedicated EHS clinics (often on a paid basis).

3. Emergency Services TUTH provides round-the-clock (24 hours a day, 365 days a year) Emergency services through its dedicated Department of Emergency Medicine. It handles all acute, life-threatening, medical, surgical, and trauma cases, including walk-in and ambulance arrivals. A separate pediatric emergency facility is also available, ensuring immediate care in line with Nepal's constitutional right to emergency health services.

4. In-patient Service In-patient (indoor) services are for patients requiring hospital admission and continuous medical/nursing care. With approximately 850 beds (expanded from the original 301 beds), the hospital offers general wards, specialized units, Intensive Care Units (ICUs), High Dependency Units (HDUs), and critical-care facilities across all major departments. Free or subsidized beds are available for needy patients, along with full support services including surgery, diagnostics, pharmacy, and rehabilitation.
