= Shahid Gangalal National Heart Centre =

Hospital in Kathmandu, Bagmati, Nepal

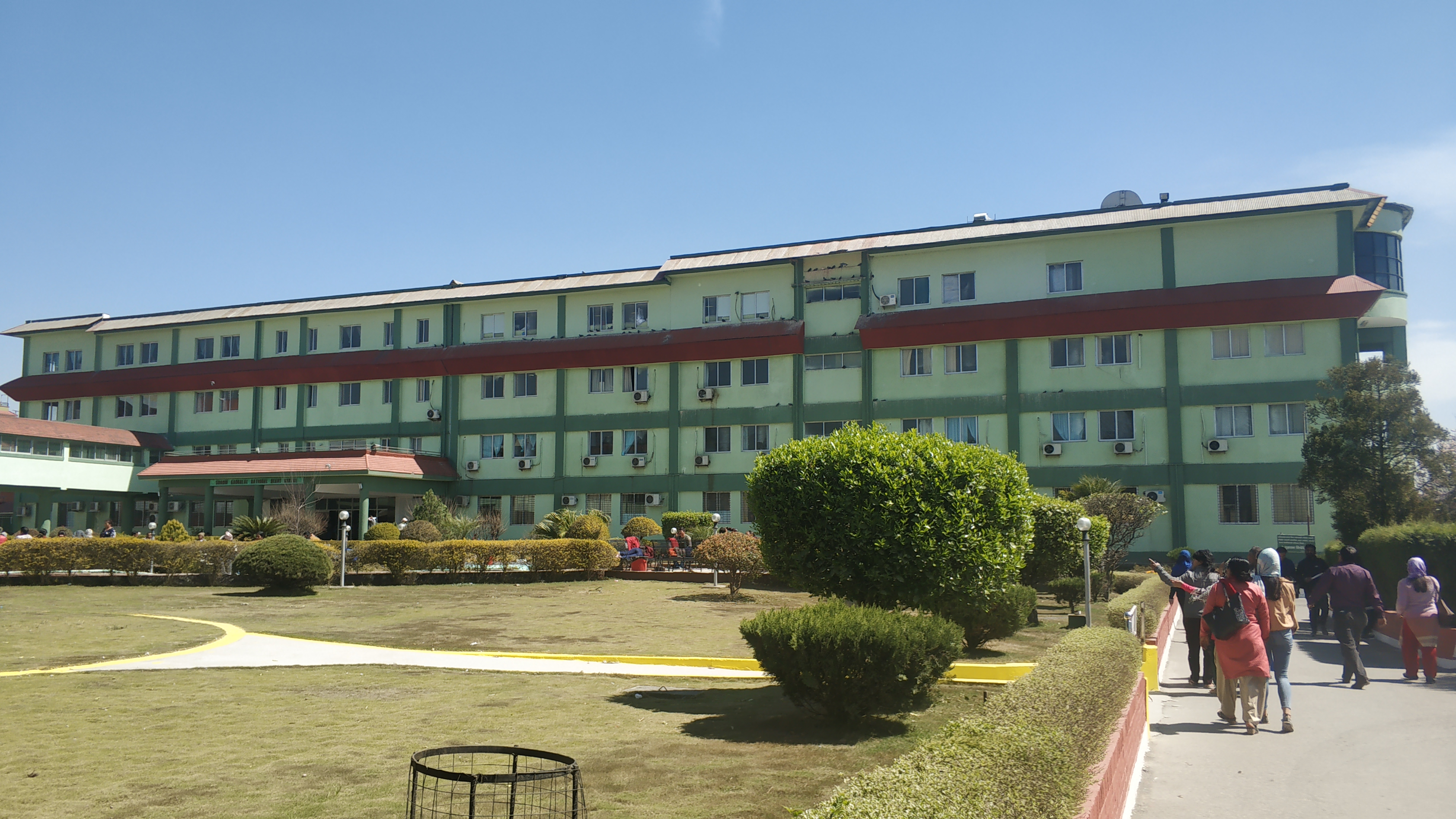

Geography
- Location: Kathmandu, Nepal
- Coordinates: 27.745997°N 85.343833°E

History
- Founded: 1995

Links
- Website: www.sgnhc.org.np
- Lists: Hospitals in Nepal

Shahid Gangalal National Heart Centre (SGNHC; Nepali: सहिद गङ्गालाल राष्ट्रिय ह्रदयरोग केन्द्र) is a government hospital which provides cardiac care, diagnostic and treatment procedures in Kathmandu, Nepal. The hospital is named after Gangalal Shrestha. It is the first cardiac tertiary center in Nepal.

== Background ==
It was established in 2052 BS (1995 AD).The hospital was founded to address the growing need for specialized cardiology services in the country. It has 300 beds facility. It also provides health insurance to the general public.

In 2023 a team of doctors from South Korea suggested to upgrade data collection system to this centre. Also, there has been talks about developing it as an educational academy.

== Services ==
The hospital provides the following services:

=== Cardiac surgery ===
- Coronary revascularization
- Valve surgery
- Congenital heart repair : ASD closure
- Aortic aneurysm repair
- PTCA
- Coronary angiography
- Coronary angioplasty
- CRT replacement
- Carotid angioplasty
- TAVI

=== Cardiology ===
- Non-invasive Cardiology : ECG, Echocardiography, Holter
- Interventional Cardiology
