= List of medical colleges in Nepal =

As of 15 August 2025, there are 29 medical institutes in Nepal whose qualifications are recognized by the Nepal Medical Council, Medical Council of India, and World Directory of Medical Schools. They are regulated by the Medical Education Commission, Nepal. Out of 29, only 10 of them are autonomous medical institute in Nepal.

== Background information ==
Medical schools in Nepal are usually known as medical colleges. The history of modern medical education in Nepal is very short. Formal medical education started in Nepal after the establishment of Institute of Medicine, Nepal in 1972 under Tribhuvan University. Previously, only few qualified doctors were present in Nepal before the pre-democracy era of 1951. While a few eager Nepalese doctors established Nepal Medical Association (NMA) on March 4, 1951 to unite all the practicing doctors. They strongly raised their voices to have medical council to regulate the medical practice in Nepal and Nepal Medical Council (NMC) was established on 28 February 1964. However, NMC started functioning after the "NMC-Rules" was approved by His Majesty's Government on 1 January 1968. At present there are eleven public medical colleges, nineteen private medical colleges and a single army funded medical college in Nepal.

== Medical seats ==
Number of registered MBBS and BDS Seats Allocation (NP)
| Province /Other | Public | | Private | | Total |
| | MBBS | BDS | MBBS | BDS | All |
|---|---|---|---|---|---|
| Koshi | 150 | 50 | 250 | 30 | 480 |
| Madhesh | 50 | 0 | 150 | 65 | 265 |
| Bagmati | 215 | 25 | 600 | 310 | 1,150 |
| Gandaki | 50 | 0 | 200 | 30 | 280 |
| Lumbini | 50 | 0 | 375 | 65 | 490 |
| Karnali | 50 | 0 | 0 | 0 | 50 |
| Sudurpashchim | 50 | 0 | 0 | 0 | 50 |
| Military | 100 | 0 | 0 | 0 | 100 |
| Pakistan Embassy Scholarship | 10 | 0 | 0 | 0 | 10 |
| Total | 725 | 75 | 1,575 | 500 | 2,875 |

== Types of Medical Institutions ==
Government Funded
Private
Military
11
(17+2) 19
1

| With UG and PG both | With PG Only |
|---|---|
| MMC-IOM | NAMS |
| BPKIHS | MBAHS |
| GMC | |
| PAHS | |
| PoAHS | |
| RAHS | |
| KAHS | |
| MIHS | |
| PUSM | |

| KUSMS | NMCTH |
| KMCTH | KISTMCTH |
| GMCTH | CMCTH |
| NoMCTH | BMCTH |
| NMCBIR | JMCTH |
| NGMC | LMCTH |
| UCMS | CMSTH |
| MCOMS | DMCTH |
BCMTH
BDS Specialized
| KDCH | PDCH |

NAIHS

== Public Medical Colleges ==
| Public Medical college | Acronym | Affiliated University | Hospital established | No. of beds | College Started | Enroll. | | Area(m2) approx. | Location | Province | Remarks | Website | Ref. |
| Public Medical college | Acronym | Affiliated University | Hospital established | No. of beds | College Started | MBBS | BDS | Area(m2) approx. | Location | Province | Remarks | Website | Ref. |
|---|---|---|---|---|---|---|---|---|---|---|---|---|---|
| Maharajgunj Medical Campus | MMC | TU | 1982 | 700 | 1978 | 100 | 25 | 84,810 | Kathmandu (Maharajgunj) | Bagmati | 1st medical college of Nepal; MBBS started in 1978; MD/MS started in 1982; DM/M Ch started in 2008 | link | |
| National Academy of Medical Sciences | NAMS | Autonomous | 1889 | 535 | 2002 | - | - | 22,000 | Kathmandu (Mahaboudha) | Bagmati | 1st hospital of Nepal; MD/MS started in 2002; DM/M Ch started in 2010 | link | |
| B.P. Koirala Institute of Health Sciences | BPKIHS | Autonomous | 1993 | 700 | 1994 | 100 | 50 | 16,00,000 | Dharan | Koshi | MBBS started in 1994 | link | |
| Patan Academy of Health Sciences | PAHS | Autonomous | 2008 | 450 | 2010 | 65 | - | 25,000 | Patan (Lagankhel) | Bagmati | In 1982, Shanta Bhawan Hospital merged with Lalitpur Hospital to form Patan Hospital, which then later changed to PAHS in 2008.; MBBS started in 2010 | link | |
| Karnali Academy of Health Sciences | KAHS | Autonomous | 2011 | 265 | 2021 | 50 | - | 17,000 | Jumla (Chandannath) | Karnali | MBBS started in 2021 | link | |
| Rapti Academy of Health Sciences | RAHS | Autonomous | 1959 | 250 | 2017 | 50 | - | ,000 | Ghorahi | Lumbini | In 2017, Rapti Sub Regional Hospital was converted to Rapti Academy of Health Sciences, which came operational since 2019.; BSC Nursing and Bachelor of Nursing Program started in 2023; Started MBBs in 2024 | link | |
| Pokhara Academy of Health Sciences | PoAHS | Autonomous | 1962 | 350 | 2019 | 50 | - | 1,05,000 | Pokhara | Gandaki | UG started in 2019; Partnered with Western Regional Hospital; Started MBBS in 2024 | link | |
| Madan Bhandari Academy of Health Sciences | MBAHS | Autonomous | 2018 | 170 | 2018 | - | - | - | Hetauda | Bagmati | B.Sc. Nursing, Bachelor of Public Health, BSc. MLT., B Pharmacy. | link | |
| Madhesh Institute of Health Sciences | MIHS | Autonomous | 2021 | 500 | 2024 | 50 | - | - | Janakpur | Madhesh | Teaching Hospital & Transformation of Provincial Hospital; Started MBBS in 2024 | link | |
| Purbanchal University School of Medicine | PUSM | PU | 1890 | 350 | 2025 | 50 | - | 54,50,000 | Sundar Haraicha, Morang | Koshi | In 2022, PU signed an agreement to use Koshi Hospital as their teaching hospital.; Started MBBS in 2025 | link | |
| Geta Medical College | GMC | MDCUHS | 2016 | 300 | 2026 | 50 | - | | Godawari, Geta | Sudurpashchim | Planned to start MBBS from 2026. | link | |

== Private Medical College ==
| Private Medical college | Acronym | Affiliated University | Hospital established | No. of beds | College Started | Enroll. | | Area(m2) approx. | Location | Province | Remarks | Website | Ref. |
| Private Medical college | Acronym | Affiliated University | Hospital established | No. of beds | College Started | MBBS | BDS | Area(m2) approx. | Location | Province | Remarks | Website | Ref. |
|---|---|---|---|---|---|---|---|---|---|---|---|---|---|
| Kathmandu University School of Medical Sciences | KUSMS | KU | 1996 | 475 | 2001 | 100 | - | 1,70,000 | Dhulikhel | Bagmati | Partnered with Dhulikhel Hospital for MBBS | link | |
| Nepal Medical College | NMCTH | KU | 1997 | 700 | 1997 | 100 | 45 | 40,000 | Gokarneshwor (Jorpati) | Bagmati | | link | |
| Kathmandu Medical College | KMCTH | KU | 1997 | 900 | 1997 | 100 | 40 | | Kathmandu (Sinamangal) | Bagmati | | link | |
| KIST Medical College | KISTMCTH | TU | 2006 | 450 | 2006 | 100 | 40 | 40,000 | Imadol | Bagmati | MBBS started in 2008 | link | |
| Gandaki Medical College | GMCTH | TU | 2007 | 750 | 2007 | 100 | 30 | 1,04,000 | Pokhara | Gandaki | MBBS started in 2010 | link | |
| Chitwan Medical College | CMCTH | TU | 2006 | 750 | 2009 | 100 | 40 | 1,49,000 | Bharatpur | Bagmati | MBBS started in 2009 | link | |
| Nobel Medical College | NoMCTH | KU | 2004 | 1050 | 2004 | 100 | 30 | 1,30,000 | Biratnagar | Koshi | MBBS started in 2007 | link | |
| Birat Medical College | BMCTH | KU | 2014 | 700 | 2014 | 100 | - | 50,000 | Biratnagar | Koshi | Offers both UG and PG medical courses; MBBS started in 2014 | link | |
| National Medical College | NMCBIR | TU | 2001 | | 2001 | 100 | 15 | 1,30,000 | Birgunj | Madhesh | First multi-specialty hospital of Madhesh Province | link | |
| Janaki Medical College | JMCTH | TU | 2003 | 525 | 2000 | 50 | 50 | 1,08,000 | Janakpur | Madhesh | MBBS started in 2003; No. of beds: 1. 160- Ramdaiya Bhawadi; 2. 365- Janakpur | link | |
| Nepalgunj Medical College | NGMCTH | KU | 1997 | 1000 | 1996 | 100 | 15 | 65,000 | Nepalgunj | Lumbini | No. of beds: 1. 750 - Kohalpur; 2. 250- Nepalgunj | link | |
| Lumbini Medical College | LMCTH | KU | 2008 | 600 | 2009 | 100 | - | 70,000 | Palpa | Lumbini | MBBS started in 2009 | link | |
| Universal College of Medical Sciences | UCMSTH | TU | 1998 | 790 | 1998 | 100 | 50 | 70,000 | Bhairawa | Lumbini | Agreement with 200 bedded Lumbini Zonal Hospital | link | |
| College of Medical Sciences | CMSTH | KU | 1993 | 750 | 1993 | 100 | 45 | 45,000 | Bharatpur | Bagmati | 2nd private medical college of Nepal; foreign investment | link | |
| Manipal College of Medical Sciences | MCOMSTH | KU | 1994 | 750 | 1998 | 100 | - | 23,500 | Pokhara (Lamachaur) | Gandaki | 1st private medical college of Nepal; foreign investment | link | |
| Devdaha Medical College | DMCTH | KU | 2006 | 300 | 2014 | 75 | - | 168,000 | Butwal | Lumbini | | link | |
| B&C Medical College | BCMTH | KU | 2012 | 300 | 2024 | 50 | - | | Birtamod | Koshi | Operation after the order of Supreme Court of Nepal | link | |
BDS Specialized Colleges
| Kantipur Dental College | KDCH | KU | 1997 | 20-50 | 1997 | - | 50 | | Kathmandu (Dhapasi) | Bagmati | | link | |
| People's Dental College | PDCH | TU | 1997 | 50-100 | 1997 | - | 50 | | Kathmandu (Naya Bazzar) | Bagmati | | link | |

== Military Medical College ==
| Military Medical college | Acronym | Affiliated University | Hospital established | No. of beds | College Started | Enroll. | | Area(m2) approx. | Location | Province | Remarks | Website | Ref. |
| Military Medical college | Acronym | Affiliated University | Hospital established | No. of beds | College Started | MBBS | MDS | Area(m2) approx. | Location | Province | Remarks | Website | Ref. |
|---|---|---|---|---|---|---|---|---|---|---|---|---|---|
| Nepal Army Institute of Health Sciences | NAIHS | TU | 1990 | 635 | 2010 | 100 | - | 1,25,000 | Kathmandu | Bagmati | Operated under Nepal Army | link | |

== Proposed and Under-construction Medical Colleges ==
| Name | City | District | Province | Year | Affiliation | Type | Status | Ref. |
|---|---|---|---|---|---|---|---|---|
| Ram Raja Prasad Singh Academy of Health Sciences | Rajbiraj | Saptari | Province No. 2 | 2016 | | Public | Under-construction | |
| Provincial Medical College | Tilottama | Rupandehi | Lumbini Province | 2016 | | Public | Under-construction | |
| Bardibas Medical College | Bardibas | Mahottari | Province No. 2 | 2016 | | Public | Under-construction | |
| Karnali Medical College | Birendranagar | Surkhet | Karnali Province | 2016 | | Public | Under-construction | |

== See also ==
- Nepal Medical Council
- List of universities in Nepal
- List of engineering colleges in Nepal
- List of forestry colleges in Nepal
- List of schools in Nepal
- List of colleges in Nepal
- University Grants Commission (Nepal)
