= Patan Academy of Health Sciences =

- पाटन स्वास्थ्य विज्ञान प्रतिष्ठान
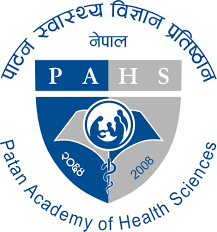
- Type: Deemed
- Established: 2008; 18 years ago
- Chancellor: Prime Minister of Nepal
- Vice-Chancellor: Dr. Nabees Man Singh Pradhan
- Location: Patan, Lalitpur, Nepal; 27.66850°N 85.31967°E
- Website: pahs.edu.np

Patan Academy of Health Sciences (PAHS) (Nepali: पाटन स्वास्थ्य विज्ञान प्रतिष्ठान) is an autonomous, not-for-profit, public institution of higher education established in 2008 with the charter granted by the Parliament of Nepal. The stated aim of the PAHS is to work in close partnership with the national health system to improve the health care services in the remote/rural areas primarily through producing technically competent and socially responsible health care workers. Currently PAHS has been running School of Medicine and School of Nursing and Midwifery. In the year 2017, PAHS started in Maters Program in Public Health (MPH) under School of Public Health (SoPH). In future, it aims to run School of Allied Health Sciences. PAHS MBBS curriculum focuses on holistic care of individual and community. PAHS preferentially enrolls students from rural areas and trains them in curriculum that emphasizes on community health and is subsequently provides support for its graduates who work in the rural areas.

== History ==
In 1954, the United Mission to Nepal (UMN), an international cooperation of Christian organizations, founded Shanta Bhawan Hospital in Kathmandu, Nepal, as a pioneering autonomous hospital to serve the underprivileged people of Nepal. In 1982, the hospital merged with Lalitpur Hospital to form Patan Hospital at its present location. PAHS was established in 2008 with the charter granted by the Parliament of Nepal. by an Act. PAHS has its own constitution passed by the parliament of Nepal, under the name Patan Academy of Health Sciences Act, 2008.

== Academics ==
PAHS has MBBS course duration of 6 years unlike rest of the universities in Nepal. PAHS also has international tie up for the clinical placement such as The University of Sydney. It has also started its own School of Nursing, which runs nursing programs of all levels including PCL, BN, BSc Nursing and Masters in Nursing. It also run its own School of Public Health, and post graduate course in clinical sciences.

=== Locations for Clinical Training ===
To supplement the core training in Patan Hospital, PAHS students are assigned to clinical postings at rural hospitals and health care centers throughout the diverse ethnic landscape of Nepal, with an emphasis on regions with disadvantaged populations. Students begin these rotations in their first year at PAHS and continue them throughout their medical education. At the remote postings, students live with local villagers and learn to overcome the apprehensions associated with working with limited resources in unfamiliar cultures.

== See also ==
- Pokhara Academy of Health Sciences
- Rapti Academy of Health Sciences
- Karnali Academy of Health Sciences
- Madan Bhandari Academy of Health Sciences
- B.P. Koirala Institute of Health Sciences
