= Pokhara Academy of Health Sciences =

Health institution in Pokhara, Nepal

- पोखरा स्वास्थ्य विज्ञान प्रतिष्ठान
- Type: Deemed
- Established: 1957
- Chancellor: Prime Minister of Nepal
- Vice-Chancellor: Dr. Narayan Singh Gurung
- Undergraduates: 50 per year (MBBS)
- Location: Pokhara, Gandaki Province, Nepal; 28.21310°N 83.99804°E
- Campus: Ramghat, Pokhara-12
- Website: poahs.edu.np
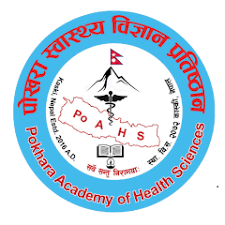

Pokhara Academy of Health Sciences (Nepali: पोखरा स्वास्थ्य विज्ञान प्रतिष्ठान) is the teaching wing of Western Regional Hospital Pokhara, Nepal. It offers Post-graduation MD/MS courses. Pokhara Academy of Health Sciences (PoAHS) is one of the nine health science academies in Nepal. The academy, which runs postgraduate degrees of medical science, has been named after the city Pokhara.

== History ==
Pokhara Academy of Health Sciences originated from the Western Regional Hospital, initially established in 1957 as Soldier Board Hospital. The government upgraded it multiple times, reaching 500 beds by 2014. In 2015 (2072 BS), the Pokhara Academy of Health Sciences Act transformed it into an autonomous academy combining medical education, research, and healthcare services. Located in Ramghat, Pokhara Metropolitan City, Kaski District, it ranks as one of Nepal's largest public hospitals outside the Kathmandu Valley and the primary government tertiary facility in Gandaki Province.

== Academic programmes ==
Programs Offered:

- MD Radiology
- MD Anesthesiology
- MS in General Surgery
- MD in Pediatrics
- MD in Obstetrics and Gynecology
- MS in Orthopedics and Trauma Surgery
- MD in Internal Medicine
- MBBS: Altogether 100 students are pursuing MBBS ; 50 in 1st batch and 50 in 2nd batch. Prof. Dr. Phanindra Prasad Poudel is the Coordinator of Basic Medical Science and HOD of Anatomy.

Goals off curriculum: 1.Integrations of knowledge and practice: Integrated Basic and Medical Science, Early Clinical Exposure, Simulation Based Training, Learning Research Methodology. 2. Development of Critical Thinking and Problem-Solving Abilities: Problem Based Learning (PBL), Case Based Discussion and Foundation For Research. 3. Cultivation of Lifelong Learning Habits: Self Directed Learning, Continuous Assessment and Feedback , Reflective Practice. 4. Professionalism and Ethical Practice: Professional Attitudes and Behaviour, Ethical Decisions and Culture Competence. 5 Evaluation and Continuous Improvement: Outcome Based Assessment, Curriculum Evaluation and Faculty Development.

- BSc Nursing
- Bachelor of Nursing Science

== Faculty of Basic Medical Science ==
- Altogether PoAHS has 148 Professors, Associate Professors and Assistant Professor.
- Anatomy: Prof. Dr. Phanindra Prasad Poudel (HOD), Assistant Professor Dr Ashish Parajuli
- Biochemistry: Laxmi Pangeni Lamsal
- Microbiology: Associate Prof. Dr. Sanjib Mani Regmi (HOD), Assistant Prof. Dr Shishir Pokhrel, Assistant Prof.Dr. Kripa Ghimire
- Pathology: Associate Prof. Dr. Laxman Bastola (HOD)
- Pharmacology:Dr Damodar Sharma (HOD), Assistant Prof. Dr. Kyushu Shah
- Physiology: Assistant Prof. Dr. Aman Shakya (HOD), Assistant Prof. Dr Jay Prakash Jha
- Community Medicine: Associate Prof. Dr. Nirmala Shrestha, Assistant Prof. Dr. Priti Acharya

== Medical facilities ==
=== Hospital services ===
The teaching hospital of Pokhara Academy of Health Sciences provides a range of medical services, including emergency, outpatient, inpatient, critical care, surgical, diagnostic, and specialized interventions.

Key services include:

- 24-hour Emergency Services: Round-the-clock emergency care with ambulance support.
- Outpatient Department (OPD): Consultations across multiple specialties.
- Inpatient care: General wards for medicine, surgery, pediatrics, maternity, orthopedics, and isolation.
- Intensive Care Unit (ICU): Critical care for seriously ill adult patients.
- Neonatal Intensive Care Unit (NICU): Specialized care for newborns.
- Surgical services: General surgery with subspecialties including urological and laparoscopic procedures.
- Diagnostic services: Radiology (X-ray, ultrasound, 24/7 imaging), pathology, microbiology, and advanced options including CT scan (in development).
- Pharmacy services: 24-hour provision of medicines and surgical supplies.
- Specialized interventions: Interventional radiology and cardiac catheterization lab (Cath Lab).
- Hematology services: Multidisciplinary care for blood disorders and cancers.
- Family planning and reproductive health: Services through the Wellness Center and Gynaecology & Obstetrics Department.
- Advanced services in development: Including transplant services and further expansions in super-specialties.

The hospital also features a Wellness Center for health screening and preventive care.

== Notables ==
On 2026 may 15, Cath Lab Team of PoAHS performed 7 angioplasty in a single day, interesting is that Mother and Son who had heart attack at same day and same time were two of the patients.

== See also ==
- Karnali Academy of Health Sciences
- B.P. Koirala Institute of Health Sciences
- Madan Bhandari Academy of Health Sciences
- Patan Academy of Health Sciences
- Rapti Academy of Health Sciences
