= NJHS =

NJHS may refer to:

- National Junior Honor Society
- New Jersey Historical Society
- North Johnston High School, North Carolina, United States
- New Jewish High School, now known as the Gann Academy
- Nepal Journal of Health Sciences, a publication of the Madan Bhandari Academy of Health Sciences
