= Cool Pokhrel =

Nepalese singer and songwriter (1981–2004)

Cool Pokharel
- कुल पोखरेल
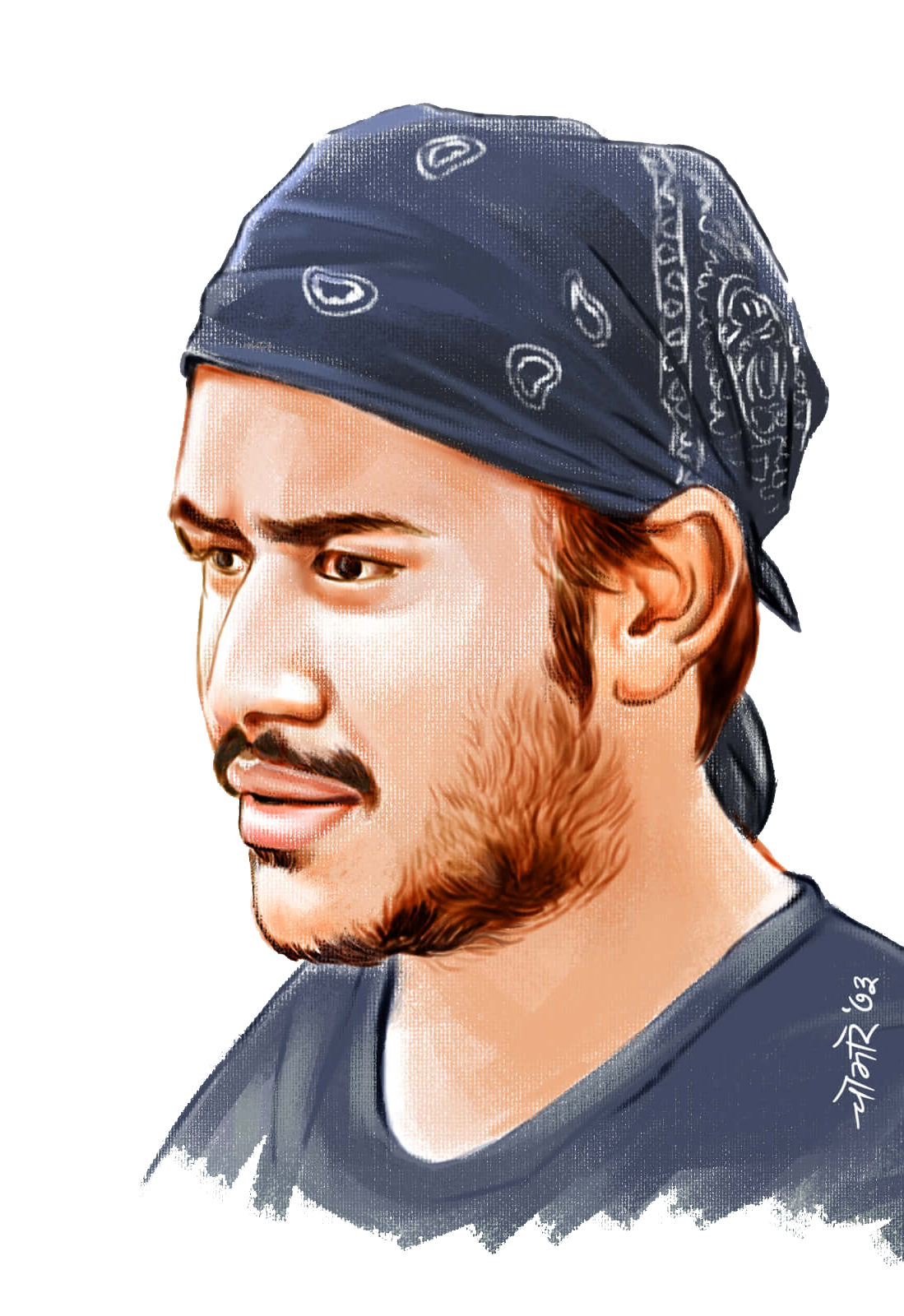
- Born: September 21, 1981; Sunwal City, Nepal
- Died: October 4, 2004 (aged 23); Patan Hospital, Nepal
- Other names: Cool Pokharel, King of the Nepalese pop, Abhimanyu
- Education: New Horizon Institute
- Occupation: Singer
- Years active: 1995–2004
- Musical career
- Genre: Pop
- Instruments: Vocal; Guitar
- Label: Cool Pokhrel

Kul Prasad Pokhrel (Nepali: कुल प्रसाद पोखरेल; September 21, 1981 – October 4, 2004) was a Nepalese singer and songwriter. Popularly known by his stage name "Cool Pokhrel" was a well known pop and folk music singer. He died in 2004, possibly of drug overdose.

Pokhrel began his singing career at the age of 11. His first recorded song, "Sun Meri Mayalu", was released during early part of his career and gained popularity and contributed to his recognition in the Nepali music scene. He later joined Nepali hip-hop group The Unity. Pokhrel recorded a number of songs during his career, including "Bolauda Kheri Boldinau", "Yespali Dashain Ma", and "Mritu Ko Chyan". He has been widely described as the "King of Nepali Pop".

Pokhrel has been described by various sources as an influential figure in the development of Nepali pop music.

== Early life and education ==
Pokhrel was born on September 21, 1981, at Sunwal City, Nepal. He completed his basic schooling at Gyanu Babu Boarding School, Pokhara. Later, he moved to London to get a diploma in Business Administration.

== Career ==
Pokhrel began his music career in 1999 with his first recorded song, "Sun Meri Mayalu", which received popularity in Nepal. He subsequently released the album Suna Meri Mayalu, followed by Aama. Songs from Aama gained recognition in the Nepali music industry. Pokhrel also collaborated with other Nepali artists, including Girish Khatiwada. One of their collaborations was later included on Khatiwada's Greatest Hits compilation album. His final song project was "Suun Ko Bala", which was performed by Avinash Ghising.

=== Musical style ===
Pokhrel primarily performed pop music throughout his career and also recorded several hip-hop songs as a member of the Nepali hip-hop group The Unity. His songs covered topics including personal experiences and family. Several songs were dedicated to members of his family, including "Ama", meaning "Mother". He also released an album titled Ama, which was dedicated to his family and was among his more successful releases.

== Discography ==
Title	Year
Sun Meri Maya	1999
Aama	2000
Hunna Ra	2002

Sun Meri Maya, meaning "Listen, My Love", includes songs concerning Pokhrel's romantic relationships and experiences during his school years. Songs on the album include "Jadei Chu Ma" and "School". Following the release of the album, his second album, Aama, meaning "Mother" was released. The album was dedicated to his mother and family, and included the song "Aama", which gained popularity among young listeners.

Pokhrel also recorded Huna Ra in collaboration with other artists. The album was produced by Music Nepal. He completed recording his another album in 2004, but it remained unreleased following his death.

== Death and legacy ==
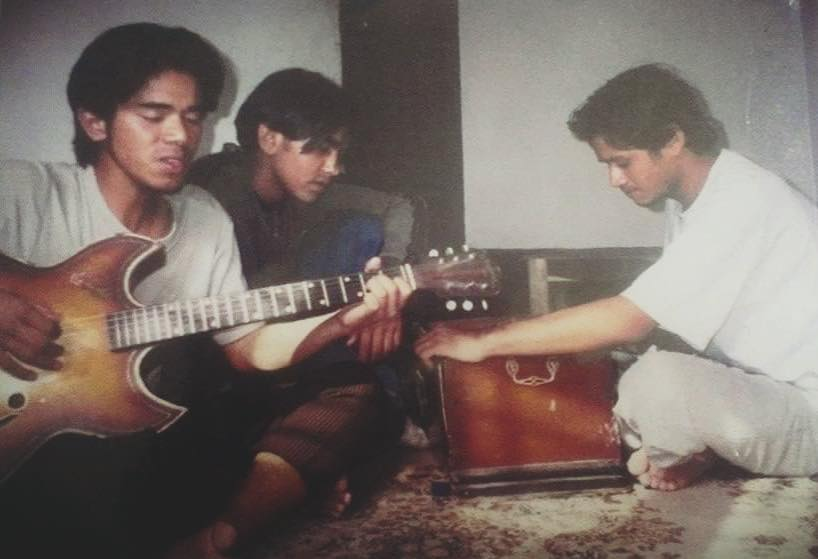
Cool Pokhrel with friends

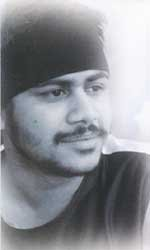
Cool Pokhrel

Pokhrel died at Patan Hospital. His death was attributed to a drug overdose by doctors at the hospital. Fifteen years after his death, Nepali artist Jhilkey Badal, also known as Badal Parasi, released a remix of Pokhrel's song "Yespali Dashain". The remix received criticism from some of Pokhrel's fans and contributed to Badal's emergence as a recording artist.

Songs dedicated to Cool

- Tribute – Unity Band
- Yespali Dashain – Jhilkey Badal (original by Cool Pokharel)
- Miss you Cool
- Sunko Bala – Avnish Ghising, Ram Chandra Kafle

Following his death, other Nepali musicians and groups, including The Unity, Jhilkey Badal, Sugam Pokharel, and Girish Khatiwada, have referenced Pokhrel and his music in their work.

== Songs ==
- "Yespali Dashain Ma"
- "Aama"
- "Janucha Malai"
- "Yo Ye Yo Yo"
- "Suna Meri Mayalu"
- "Hunna Ra"
- "Bhantheu Bhanaula"
- "Kina Udas"
- "Nepali Jeevan"
