= List of forestry colleges in Nepal =

There are several colleges running programs forestry programs from bachelor level to P.Hd. in Nepal which are affiliated to various universities.

== Tribhuvan University ==
TU has 3 constituent campuses for forestry courses. It has also given affiliation to 1 private college.

=== Constituent campuses ===
- Pokhara Campus
- Hetauda Campus
- School of Forestry and Natural Resource Management, Kirtipur

=== Affiliated colleges ===
- Kathmandu Forestry College, Kathmandu

== Agriculture and Forestry University ==
AFU has one constituent campus and 2 affiliated colleges for forestry studies.

=== Constituent campuses ===
- Faculty of Forestry (AFU), Hetauda
- College of Natural Resource Management, Katari

=== Affiliated colleges ===
- Siddhant Campus, Gaidakot

== Purbanchal University ==
PU has 1 constituent campus for forestry course. It also has given affiliation to 1 college.

=== Constituent campus ===
- Purbanchal University College of Environment and Forestry, Gothgaun

=== Affiliated colleges ===
- Durga Devi Community Development Center, Padajungi
- Lumbini Integrated Academy, Rupandehi

== Far Western University ==
Far Western University has BSc forestry course at Kailali Multiple Campus (B.Sc, Forestry).

Faculty of Natural Resource Management (FNRM)

- School of Natural Resource Management

== See also ==
- List of medical colleges in Nepal
- List of engineering colleges in Nepal
