= Pimbahal Pond =

Artificial pond located in Lalitpur, Nepal

- पिम्बहाल पोखरी (Nepali)
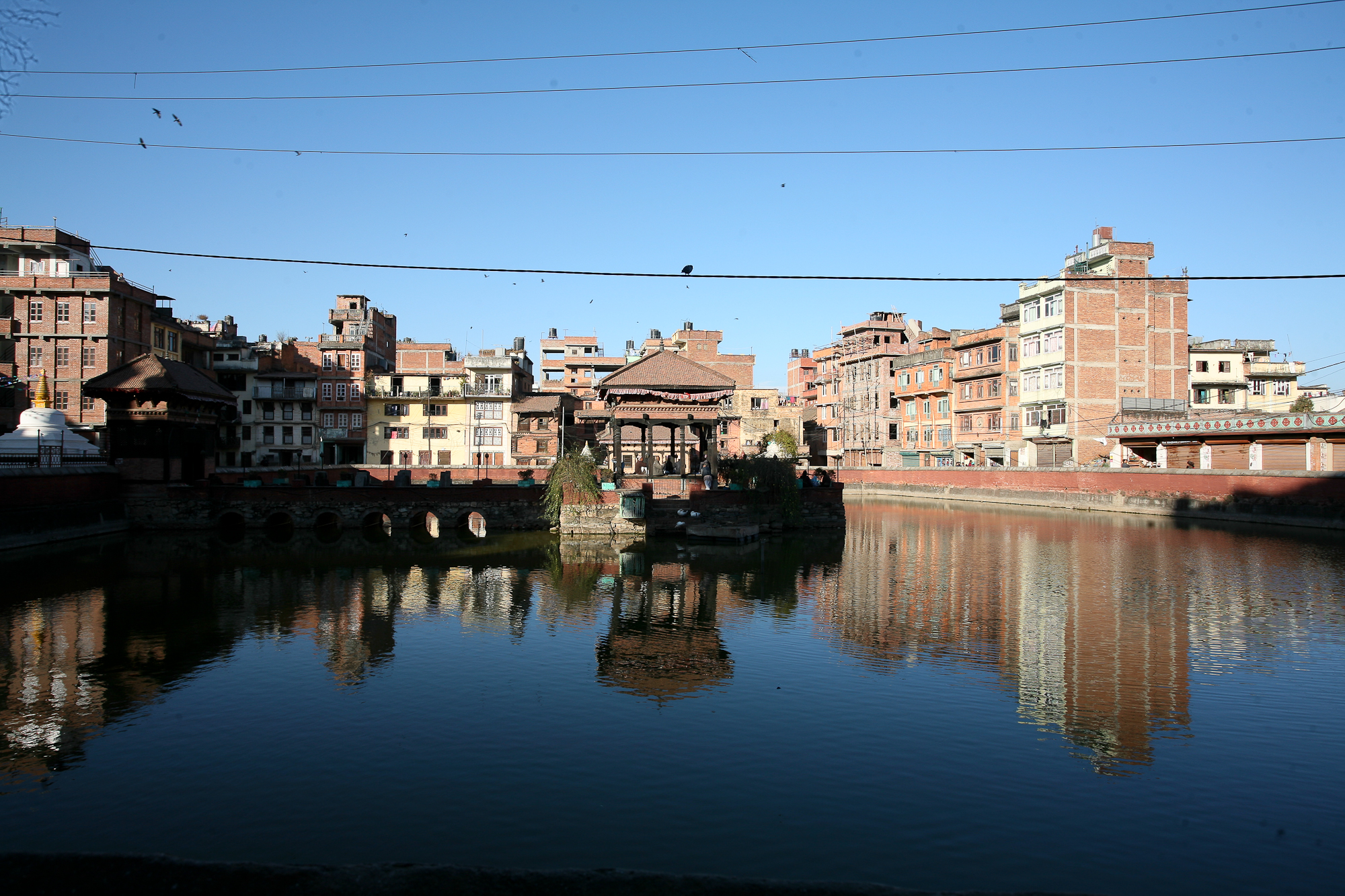
- Pimbahal Pond in 2014

- Location of Pimbahal Pond in Nepal
- Location: Lalitpur, Nepal
- Coordinates: 27°40′34″N 85°19′16″E
- Type: Artificial pond
- Built: 14th century

Pimbahal Pond (also known as Pimbahaa Pukhoo, and Pim Bahal Pokhari; Nepali: पिम्बहाल पोखरी) is an artificial pond located in Lalitpur, Nepal (historically known as Patan). According to Nepalese folklore, the pond was built by Lakheys, a type of demon. In 1967, the Nepalese government tried to turn the pond into a market, but received local resistance. Pimbahal Pond was destroyed due to the 1934 Nepal–India earthquake and the April 2015 Nepal earthquake. But was rebuilt after those incidents.

== History ==
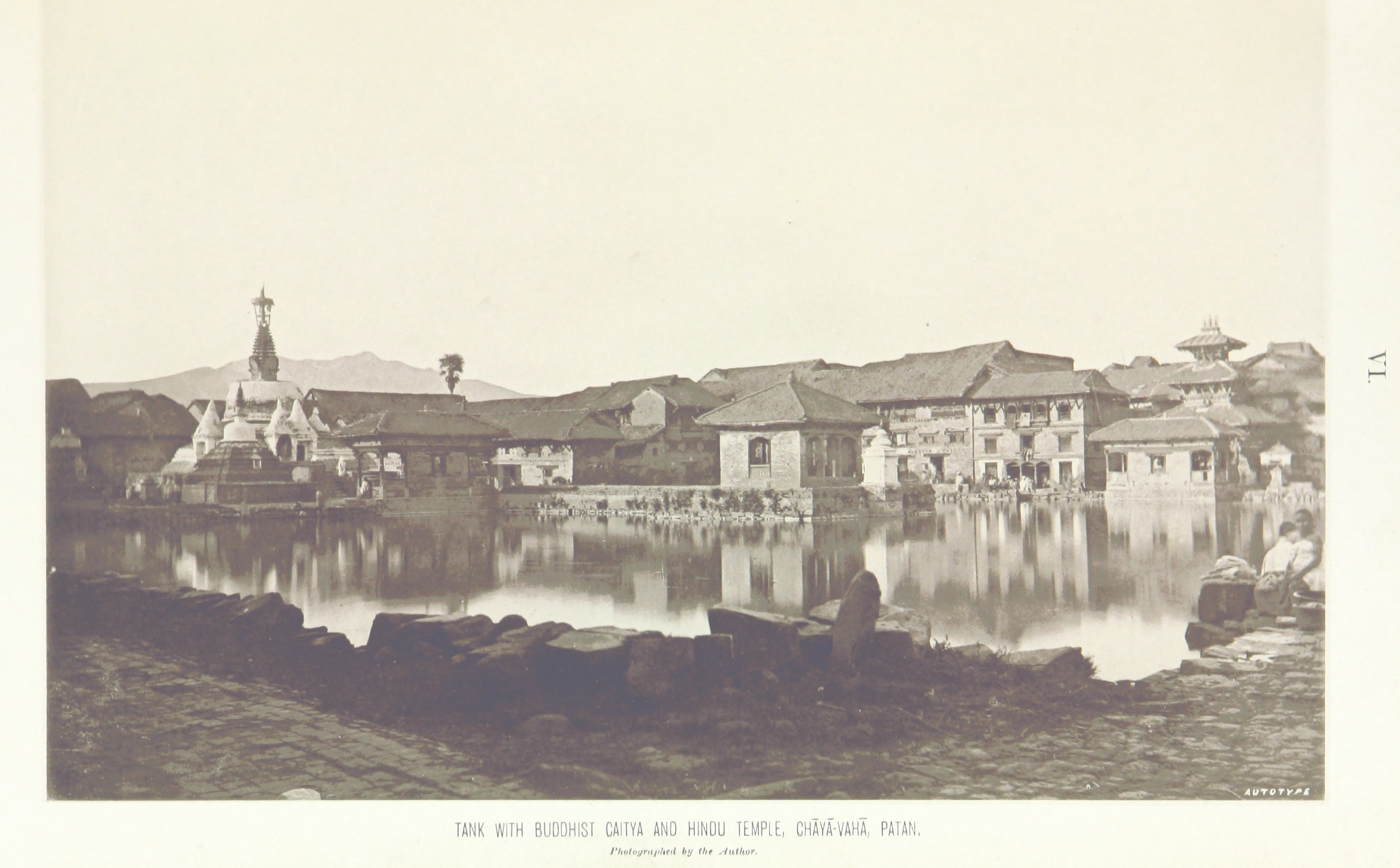
Pimbahal Pokhari in 1884–5.

There are various legends concerning how the pond was built. One says that around the 14th century, Pimbahal was just empty ground. During the day, it was an active place but at night, it was said to be wandered by Lakheys, a type of demon in Nepalese folklore. Lakheys would come every night and make loud noises, break into homes, scare children and cause a disturbance in the area. Local resident Gaya Baje became annoyed by their acts, so he used his magical powers to control them and made them dig a pond at Pimbahal because "as long as the ground existed, the Lakheys would keep coming". According to another legend, Lakhey's wife had to travel far away to get water during wintertime because the taps would run dry. There were no ponds in Lalitpur during that time and, not wanting to see his wife have to walk far, the demon built the Pimbahal Pond in one night.

On the north side of the pond, a Chandeswari Temple is dating back to 1663 and also near Pimbahal Pond there a stupa that was damaged by Muslim invaders in 1357.

The 1934 Nepal–India earthquake devastated the pond. The pond's restoration model was reportedly based on a painting by Henry Ambrose Oldfield. In 1967, the Government of Nepal attempted to build a market on top of the pond which led to local resistance; as a result, the government backed down. By 2014, the pond was reported to be in a neglected state and the city was having difficulty maintaining it. The April 2015 Nepal earthquake damaged the pond, but in 2017, the pond was restored to its original look. Pimbahal Pond is one of the well-known ponds of Lalitpur.
