= Anjani Kumar Jha =

Nepalese Oncologist, professor

- Education: MBBS(Bangladesh) MD(Manipal India) Fellowship in Paliative care
- Medical career
- Profession: Oncologist
- Institutions: Nepal Medical Association Nepal Health Research Council Medical Education Commission Nepal Medical Council
- Sub-specialties: Radiation Oncology

Anjani Kumar Jha (born 16 April 1964) is a Nepalese physician who works as a radiation oncologist. On September 7, 2023, he was appointed as the Vice- Chairperson of the Medical Education Commission (MEC) by the Council of Ministers of Nepal.

He comes from lower middle class family. His father was a school teacher. He earned his MBBS in Bangladesh and MD from Manipal, India.

Previously he had served as the Chairman of Nepal Health Research Council and Nepal Medical Association.
