= Lalitpur, Nepal =

Metropolitan city in Bagmati Province, Nepal

Lalitpur 𑐫𑐮 (Newar) ललितपुर (Nepali) पाटन (Patan)
- Metropolitan City
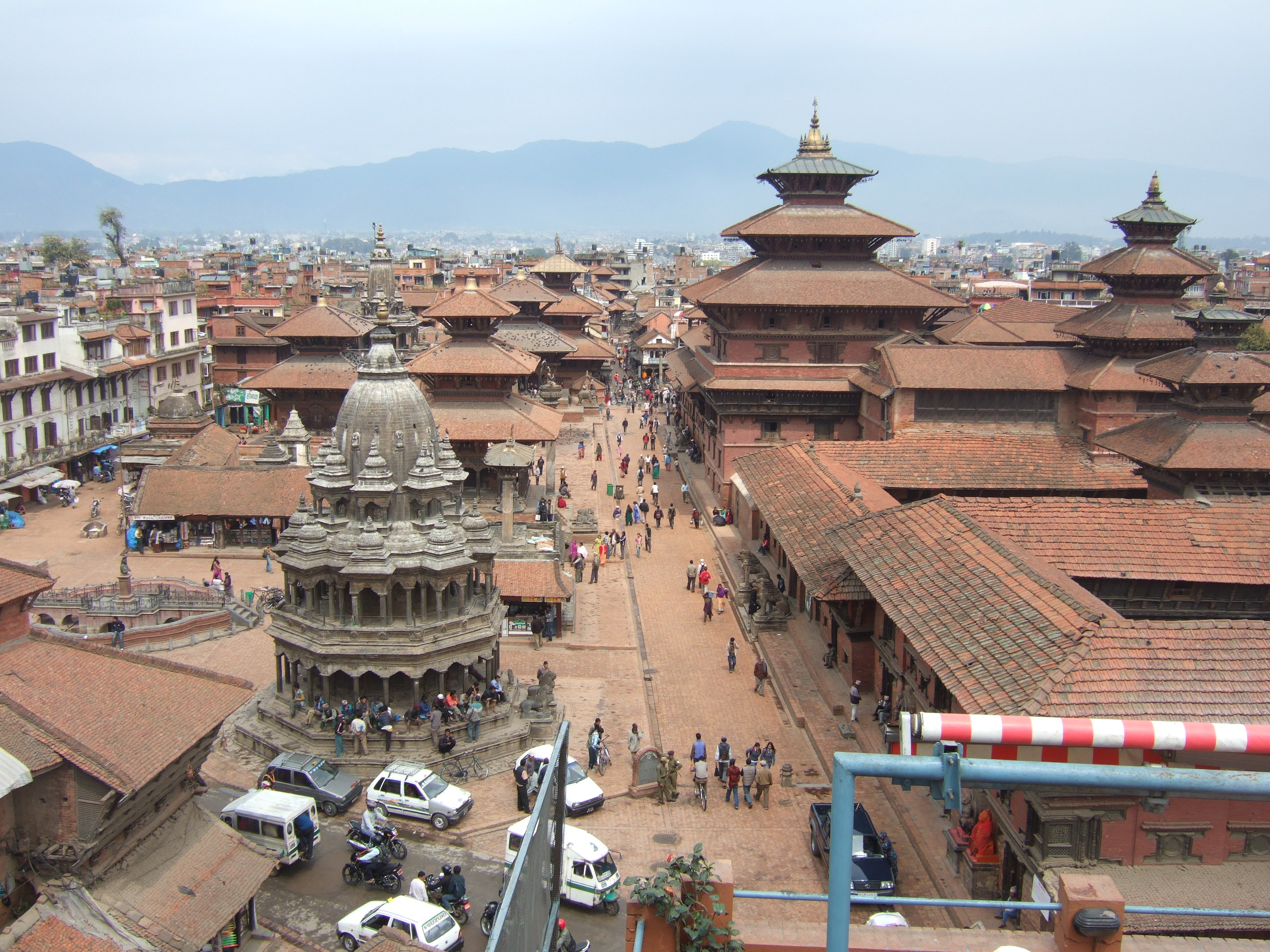
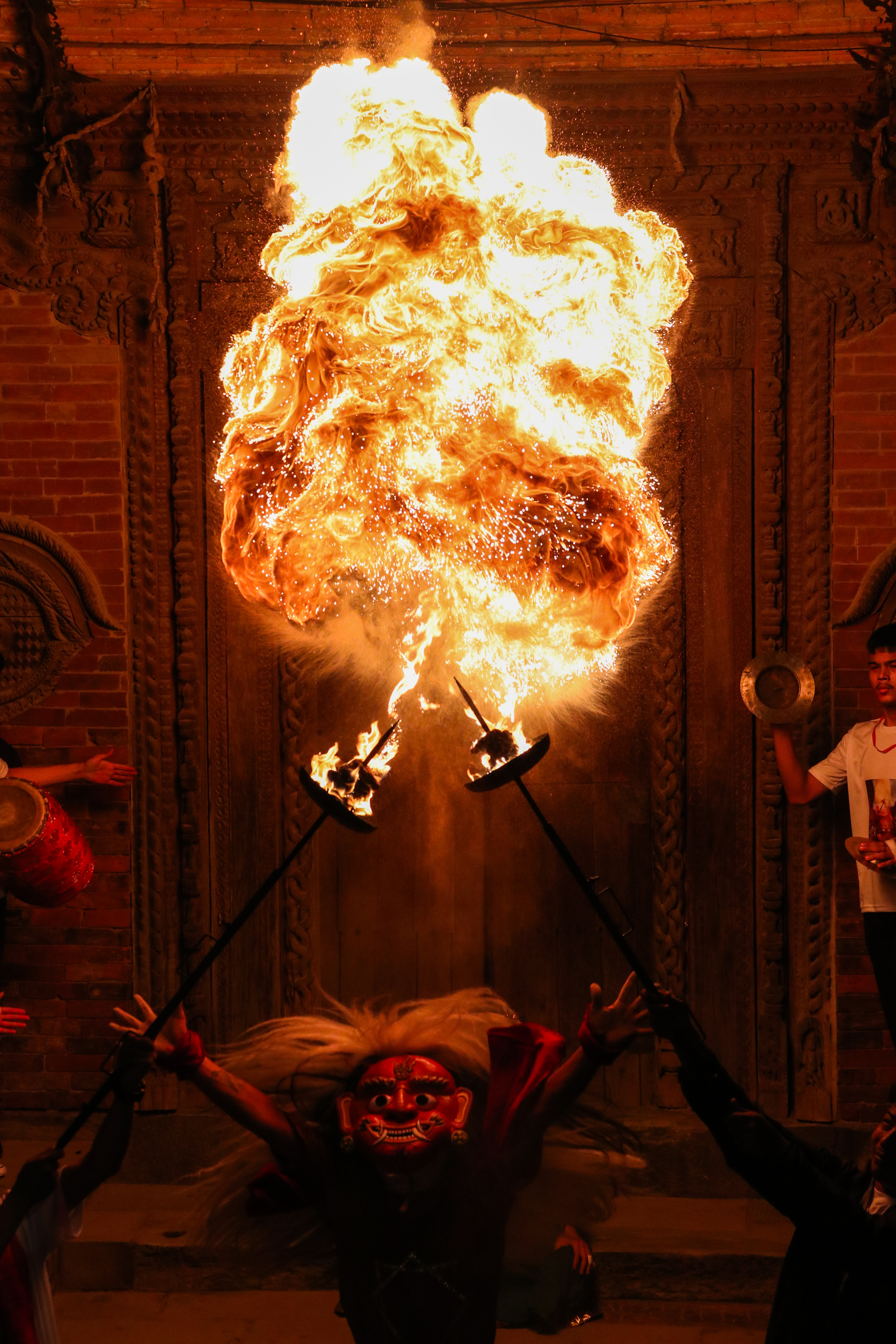
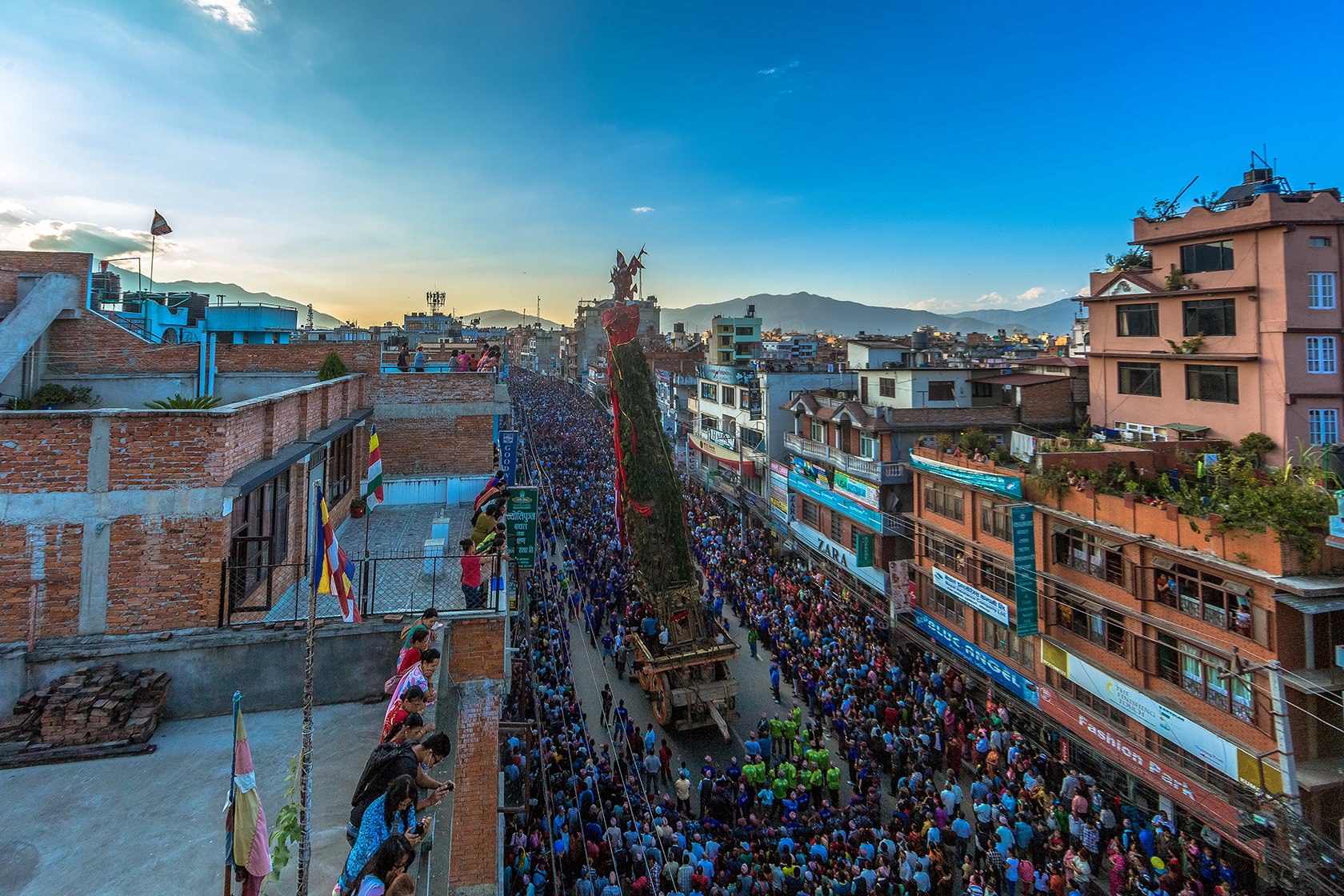
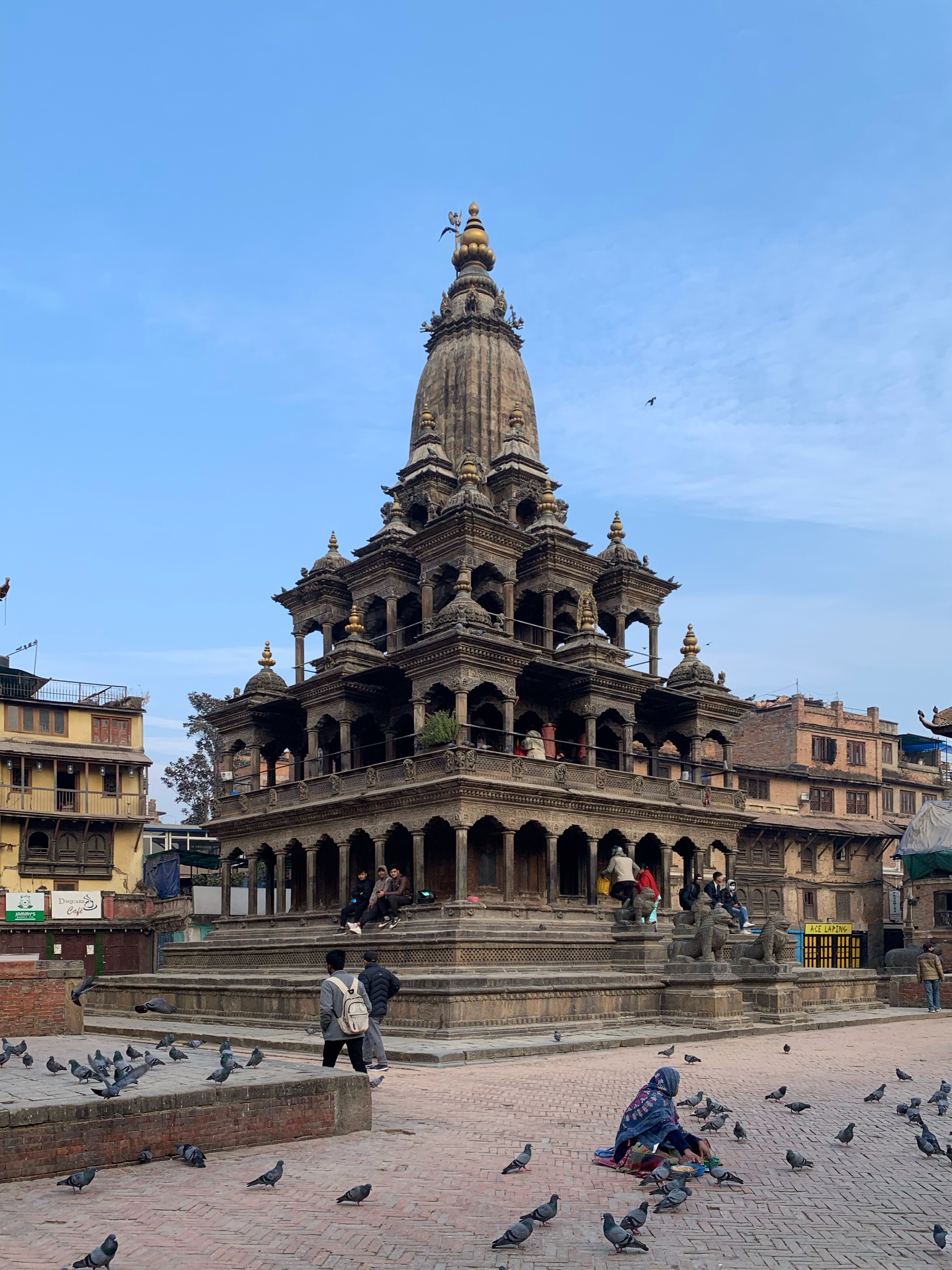
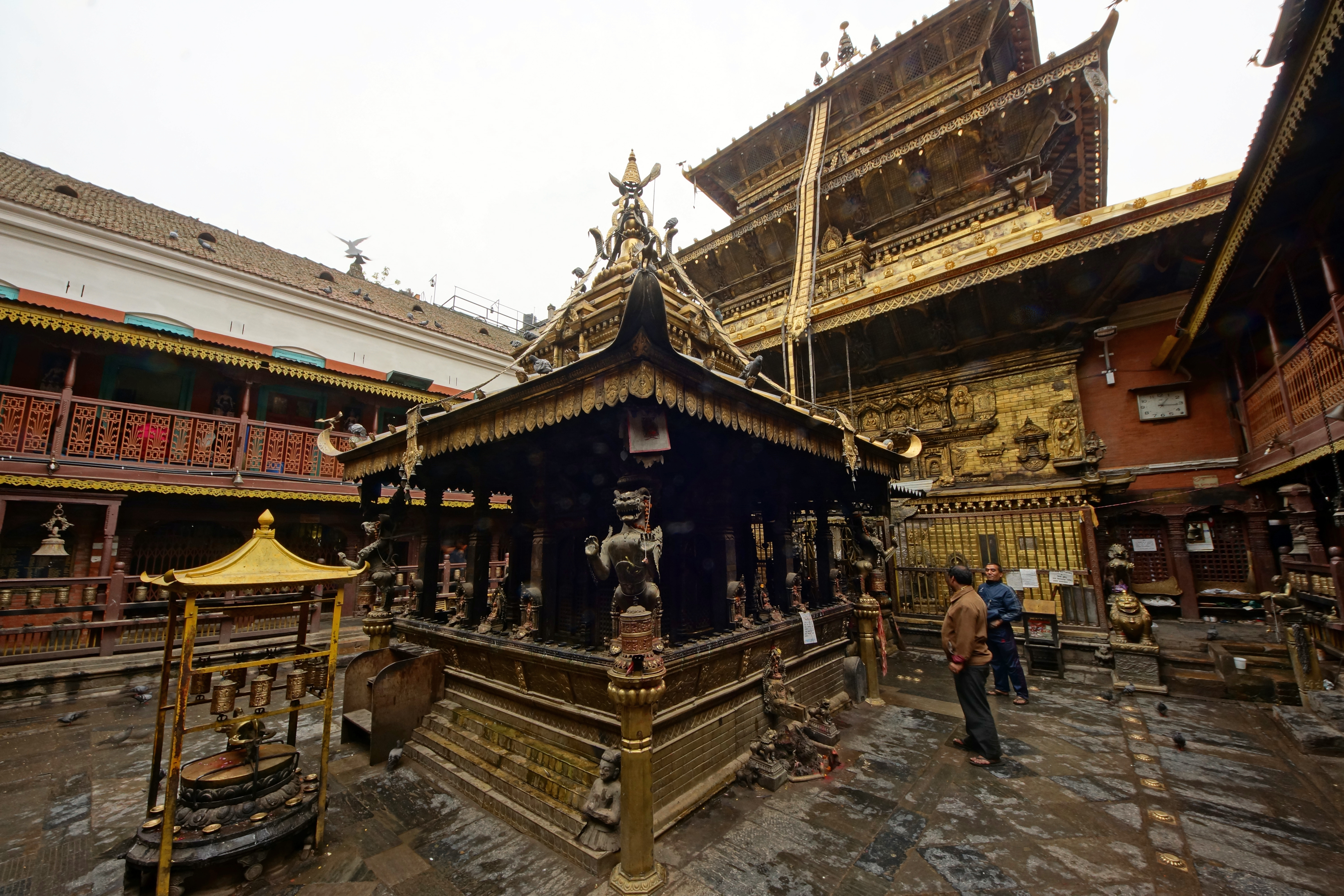
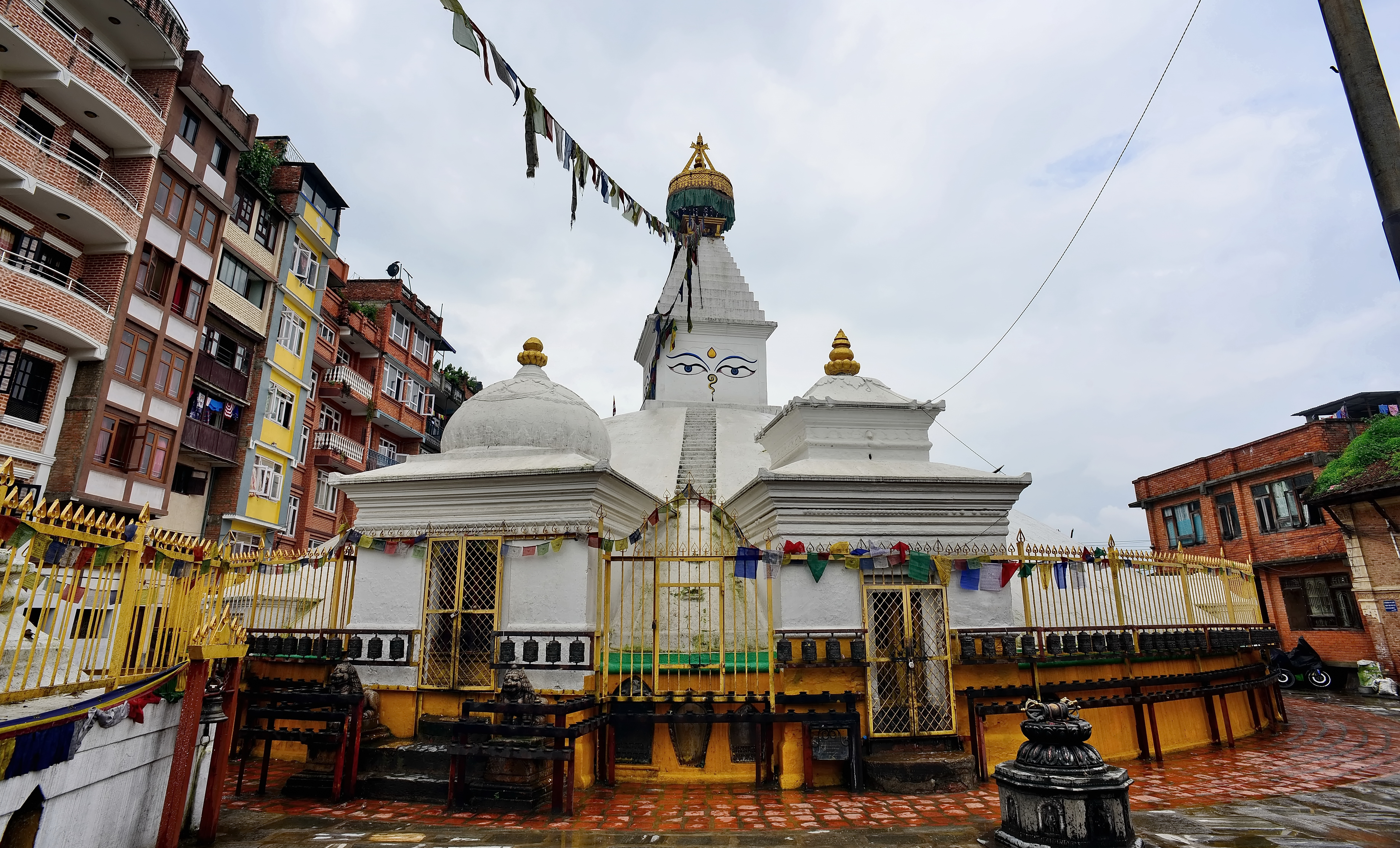
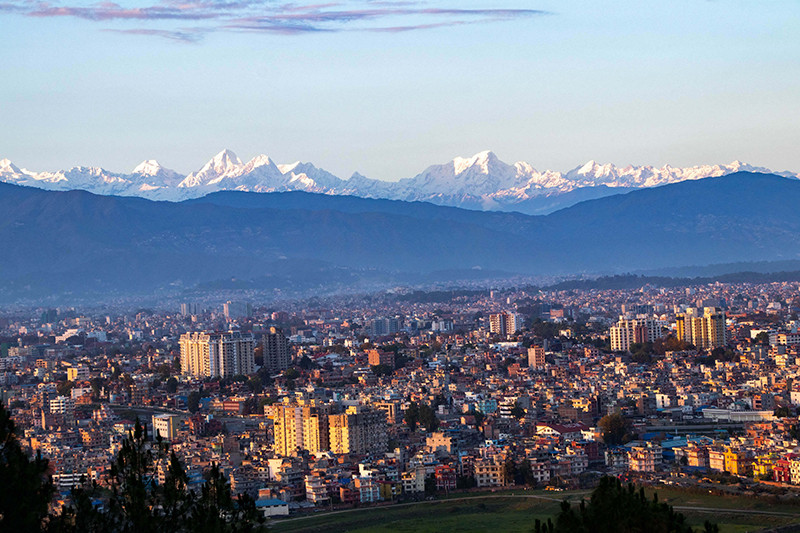
- Patan Durbar Square—UNESCO World Heritage Site. Mipwa Lakhey Chariot of Machindranath Krishna Mandir Golden Temple Ashok Stupa Chaitya Lalitpur Skyline with Jugal Himal in background

- Seal
- Nickname: City of Fine Arts
- Motto(s): Nepali: सुन्दर ललितपुर शहर, नगर प्रहरी हरेक घर, lit. 'Beautiful Lalitpur City, Municipal Police in Every Home'
- Interactive map of Lalitpur
- Location within Bagmati Province Location within Nepal
- Coordinates: 27°40′35″N 85°19′00″E
- Country: Nepal
- Province: Bagmati
- District: Lalitpur
- Incorporated: 1918
- No. of Wards: 29

Government
  - Type: Mayor-council
  - Body: Lalitpur Metropolitan City Council
  - Mayor: Chiri Babu Maharjan (NC)
  - Deputy mayor: Manjali Shakya Bajracharya (CPN-UML)
  - Executive officer: Rekha Das Shrestha

Area
  - Total: 37.4 km^{2} (14.4 sq mi)
- Elevation: 1,350 m (4,430 ft)

Population (2021 Nepal census)
  - Total: 299,283
  - Rank: 4th
  - Density: 8,002/km^{2} (20,730/sq mi)
  - Households: 77,159 (4th most)

Languages
  - Official: Newari, Nepali and (Other Language)

Ethnicities
  - Ethnicities: Newar, Bahun, Chhetri, Tamang
- Time zone: UTC+5:45 (NST)
- Postal Code: 44700
- Area code: 01
- Website: www.lalitpurmun.gov.np

Lalitpur (Nepali: ललितपुर [ləˈlɪt̪pʊɾ]) (Note: officially Lalitpur Metropolitan City (Nepali: ललितपुर महानगरपालिका, Lālitapura Mahānagarapālikā), also known as Patan (Sanskrit: पाटन, Pāṭana), Yala (Newar: 𑐫𑐮), and Manigal,), locally known as Yala (Nepal Bhasa: 𑐫𑐮 [jəˈlʌ]), is a metropolitan city and fourth most populous city of Nepal with 299,843 inhabitants living in 77,159 households per the 2021 census. It is located in the south-central part of Kathmandu Valley, a large valley in the high plateaus in central Nepal, at an altitude of 1,350 metres (4,430 feet).

Its cultural heritage includes a tradition of arts and crafts. It has a multi-ethnic population with a Hindu and Buddhist majority. Religious and cultural festivities form a major part of the lives of people residing in Kathmandu. Tourism is an important part of the city's economy and it stages festivals and feasts, Lalitpur is home to Patan Durbar Square, which has been listed by UNESCO as a World Heritage Site.

== History ==
=== Ancient history ===
The city is believed to have been founded by King Varadeva in 290 CE, though local legends trace its origins even earlier. Lalitpur was historically known as Yala in the Newar language and Patan in Sanskrit. The Mauryan Emperor Ashoka is said to have visited the region around 249 BC, erecting four stupas at the cardinal points of the city—still standing today as markers of its ancient Buddhist heritage. During the Licchavi period (c. 400–750 CE), Patan emerged as a center of trade and religion, with early inscriptions and stone sculptures indicating a thriving urban culture.

=== Malla Era ===
Lalitpur flourished under the Malla kings (12th–18th century), who transformed the city into a masterpiece of Newar architecture and urban planning. The Patan Durbar Square, now a UNESCO World Heritage Site, was developed during this era, featuring: Krishna Mandir (built in 1637 by King Siddhi Narsingh Malla), Hiranya Varna Mahavihar (Golden Temple), Sundari Chowk, Mul Chowk, and other royal courtyards. The city became a hub for metalwork, wood carving, and stone sculpture, with artisans exporting their work across Asia. Lalitpur maintained a unique religious syncretism, where Hindu and Buddhist traditions coexisted and often merged in festivals, rituals, and iconography. During periods of political instability, Lalitpur was governed by a council of noble officials called the Six Pradhans.

=== Medieval era ===
==== Early Shah rule ====
In 1768, Lalitpur was annexed by Prithvi Narayan Shah during the unification of Nepal. Unlike Kathmandu and Bhaktapur, the conquest of Patan was reportedly peaceful, though followed by economic decline and loss of autonomy. The Shah rulers centralized power in Kathmandu, and Lalitpur's royal court was dissolved.

==== Rana rule ====
During the Rana regime (1846–1951), Lalitpur saw limited modernization, with infrastructure and education concentrated in elite circles. The city retained its artisanal identity, with families continuing traditional crafts through generations.

=== Modern history ===
After the 1990 People's Movement, Lalitpur gained local governance rights and began urban expansion. In 2017, Lalitpur was officially declared a Metropolitan City, incorporating surrounding wards and expanding its administrative reach. The city now comprises 29 wards.

== Geography ==
Lalitpur is on the elevated tract of land in Kathmandu Valley on the south side of the Bagmati River, which separates it from the city of Kathmandu on the northern and western side. The Karmanasa Khola acts as the boundary on the eastern side. It was developed on relatively thin layers of deposited clay and gravel in the central part of a dried ancient lake known as the Nagdaha. The city has an area of 15.43 square kilometres and is divided into 29 municipal wards.

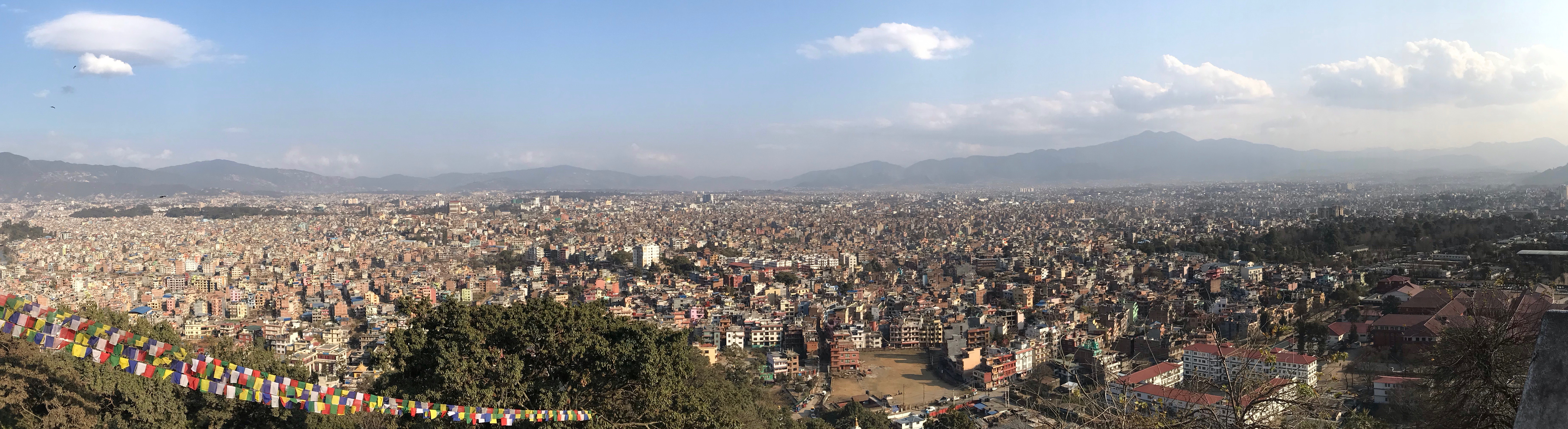
Panoramic view of the Kathmandu valley from Swayambhu

=== Climate ===
Climate is characterized by relatively high temperatures and evenly distributed precipitation throughout the year. The Köppen Climate Classification subtype for this climate is "Cfa" (Humid Subtropical Climate).

== Historical monuments ==
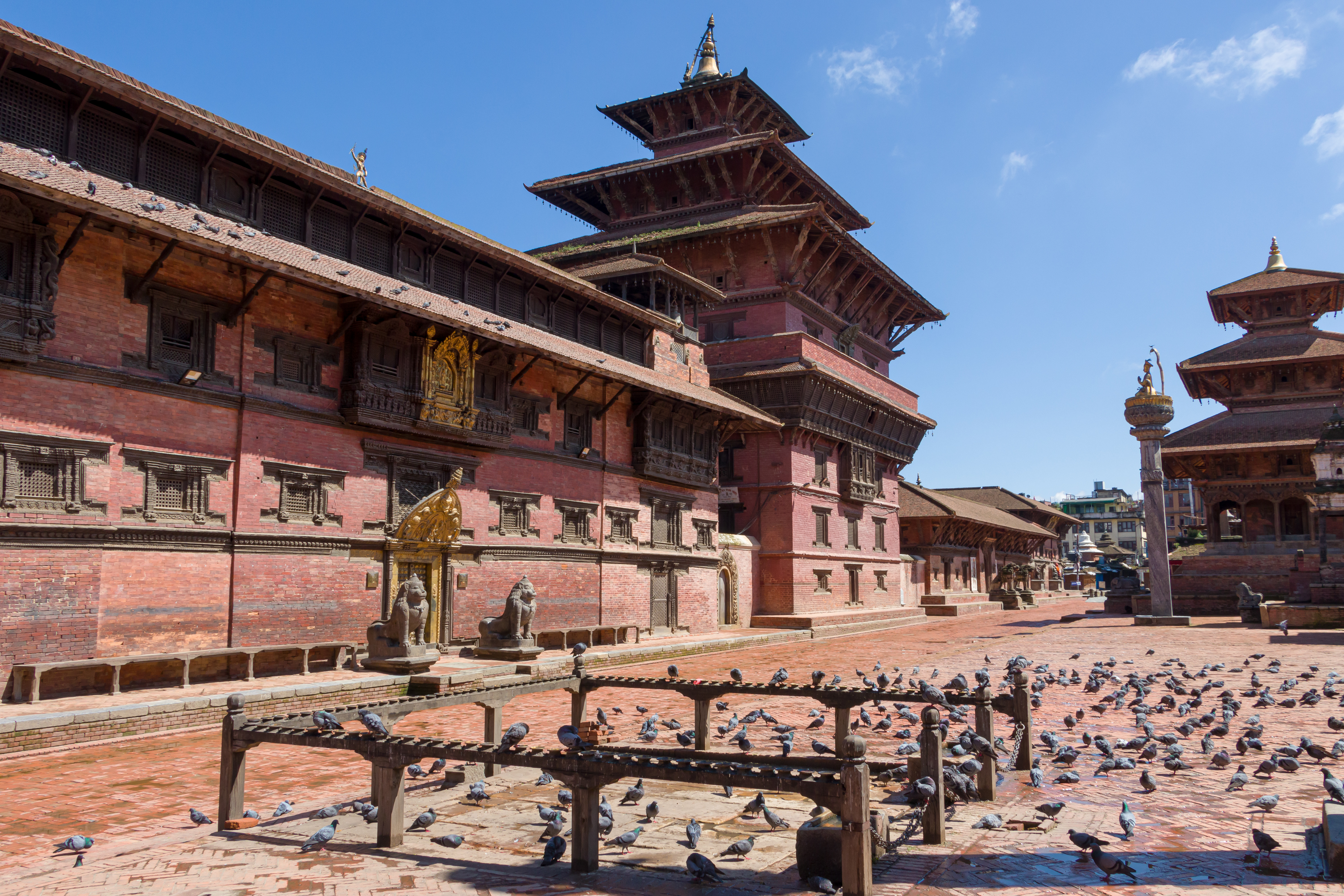
Patan Durbar Square

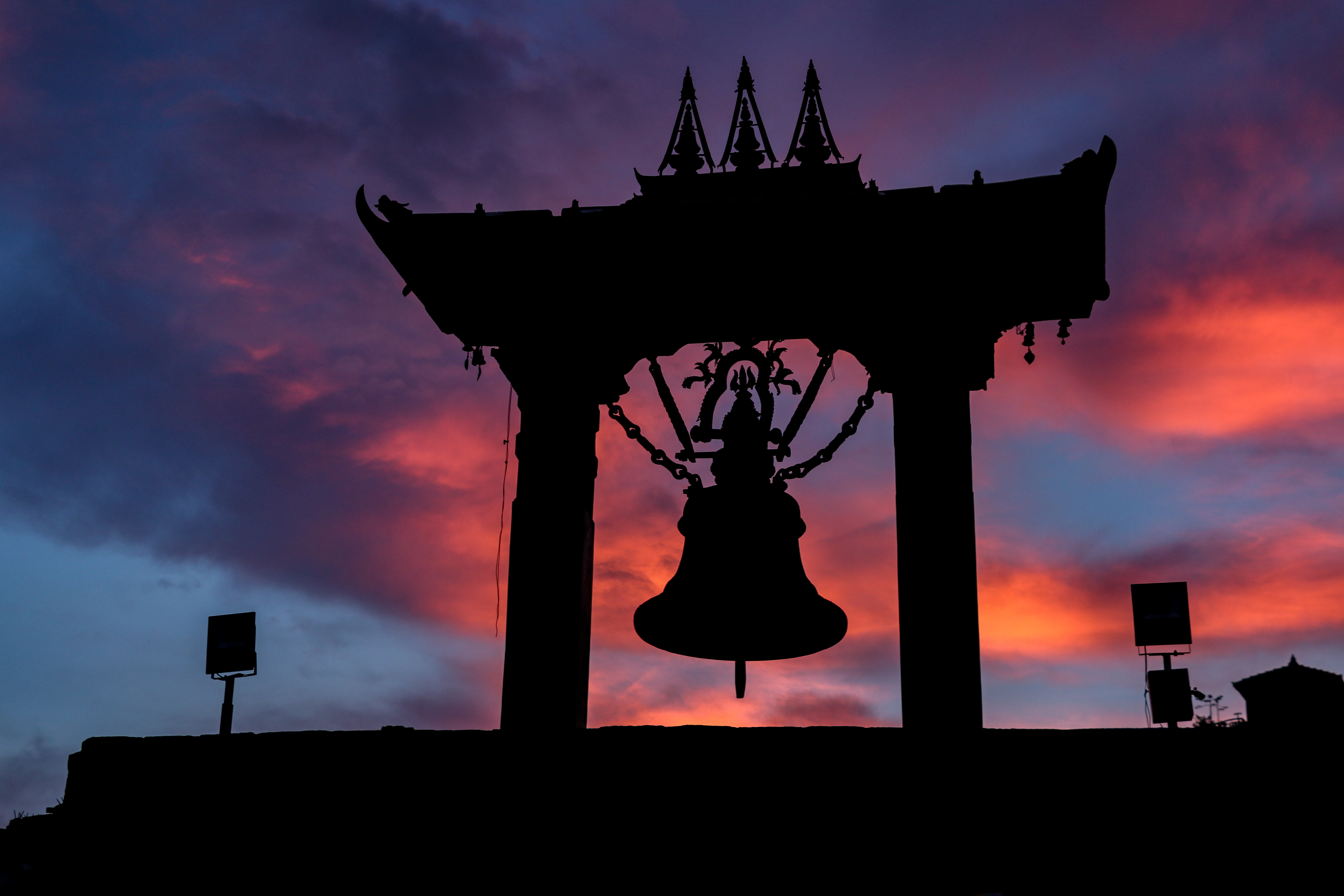
Evening shot of Big Bell at Patan Durbar Square

Patan Durbar Square has been listed by UNESCO as one of seven Monument Zones that make up the World Heritage Site of the Kathmandu Valley. The square was heavily damaged on 25 April 2015 by an earthquake.

== Demographics ==
=== Language ===
1. Nepali (44.9%)
2. Nepal Bhasa (35.2%)
3. Tamang (6.20%)
4. Maithili (3.40%)
5. Magar (1.70%)
6. Bhojpuri (1.40%)
7. Others (7.20%)

As of the 2011 census, Nepali is the most common mother tongue in Lalitpur with 44.9% of the population speaking it as their mother tongue. Newar is spoken by 35.2% while the other languages spoken in the city include Tamang (6.2%), Maithili (3.4%), Magar (1.7%), Bhojpuri (1.4%) and Rai (1.3%) as their first language. English is also spoken by many, especially as a non-primary language.

=== Ethnic groups ===
Ethnic groups in Lalitpur
1. Newar (36.9%)
2. Chhetri (15.9%)
3. Hill Brahman (11.9%)
4. Tamang (8.30%)
5. Magar (5.40%)
6. Madhesi (3.50%)
7. Others (18.1%)

The largest group is the native Newars, whose various sub-groups combine to make up 39.6% of the population. The second largest ethnic group is Chhetri, who account for 15.9% of the population while Bahuns also known as Hill-Brahmin or Khas Brahmin, represent 11.9% of the population. Other groups in Kathmandu include the Janajatis, comprising the Tamang (8.3%), Magar (3.5%), Rai (3.5%) and Gurung (1.5%). Nepalese Muslims represent 0.7% of the population. More recently, other Madeshi groups from Terai have come to represent a substantial proportion of the city's population.

== Religions ==
Religious groups in Lalitpur
1. Hinduism (72.3%)
2. Buddhism (19.2%)
3. Christianity (5.70%)
4. Kirat (1.70%)
5. Islam (0.80%)
6. Animism (0.10%)
7. Others (0.20%)

In terms of religion, 82.3% were Hindu, 17.2% Buddhist, 0.7% Christian, 1.00% Kirati, 0.8% Muslim, 0.1% Prakriti and 0.2% others. The Catholic cathedral, dedicated to the Assumption of the Blessed Virgin Mary, is located in Lalitpur.

== Economy ==
A substantial portion of the population is engaged in trades, notably in traditional handicrafts and small-scale cottage industries, and some residents work in agriculture. Lalitpur has produced the highest number of renowned artists and finest craftsmen ever recorded in the history of Nepali art. Lalitpur has maintained a culture of craftwork even in the face of rapid urbanization and many social and political upheavals.

The city is less urbanized than Kathmandu, north of the Bagmati river, but is home to many workshops, stores, restaurants, hotels, schools, embassies and other important sectors of the Kathmandu Valley economy. Buddha Air has its headquarters in Jawalakhel near Patan.

== Education ==
In terms of literacy, NepalMap Literacy states that 86.0% could read and write, 1.6% could only read and 12.4% could neither read nor write.

=== Primary and secondary education ===
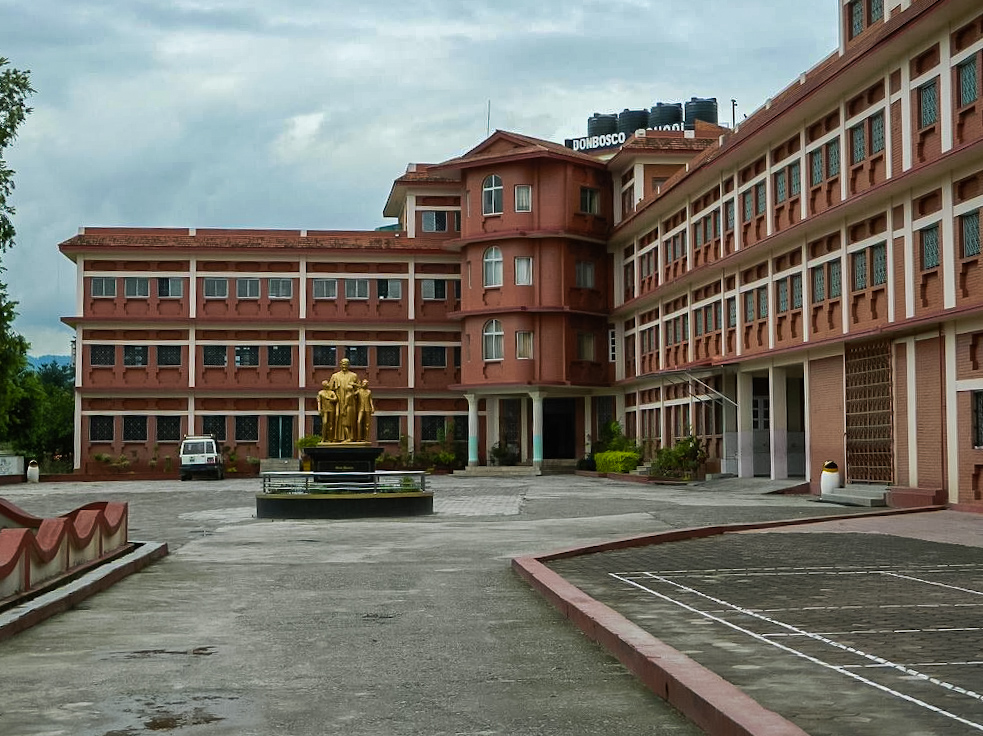
Nepal Don Bosco School, Siddhipur, Lalitpur

Lalitpur is home to a few schools and colleges of Nepal. Every year thousands of students from all over Nepal arrive at Kathmandu to get admission in the various schools and colleges. Among all, the largest schools are Ideal Model School, Ullens School, Rato Bangla School, Premier International IB World School, British School, KMC Balkumari, St. Xavier's School, Nepal Don Bosco School, Little Angels' School and Gyanodaya Bal Batika School.

Other schools include the Hindu Vidya Peeth Nepal, St. Mary's, Graded English Medium School, DAV Sushil Kedia, Adarsha Kanya Niketan, Tri-padma Vidyashram, Adarsha Saral Madhyamik Vidyalaya, Sudesha High School, and Nava Suryodaya English Secondary School.

=== Postsecondary education ===
Lalitpur is home to Pulchowk Engineering Campus, one of the oldest and most reputed colleges affiliated with the Institute of Engineering, Tribhuvan University. Patan Academy of Health Sciences is the only medical university in the city with Patan Hospital as its primary teaching hospital, and there is another private medical school - KIST Medical College in Lalitpur. Other institutions of higher learning in Patan include Patan Multiple Campus, Virinchi College and Kathmandu University School of Management (KU SOM).

=== Libraries ===
Nepal National Library which was established in 1957 AD was moved to Lalitpur from Singha Durbar in 2061 BS. It is at Harihar Bhawan. Madan Puraskar Pustakalaya, located near Patan Dhoka, is another library, which awards the Madan Puraskar and Jagadamba Shree Puraskar literary prizes is in the city. There are also numbers of libraries around Lalitpur Metropolitan city such as Deepawali Pustakalaya in Satdobato, Buddhibikash Library in Lagankhel, and Sanu Ko Pustakalaya in Manbhawan.

== Landmarks ==
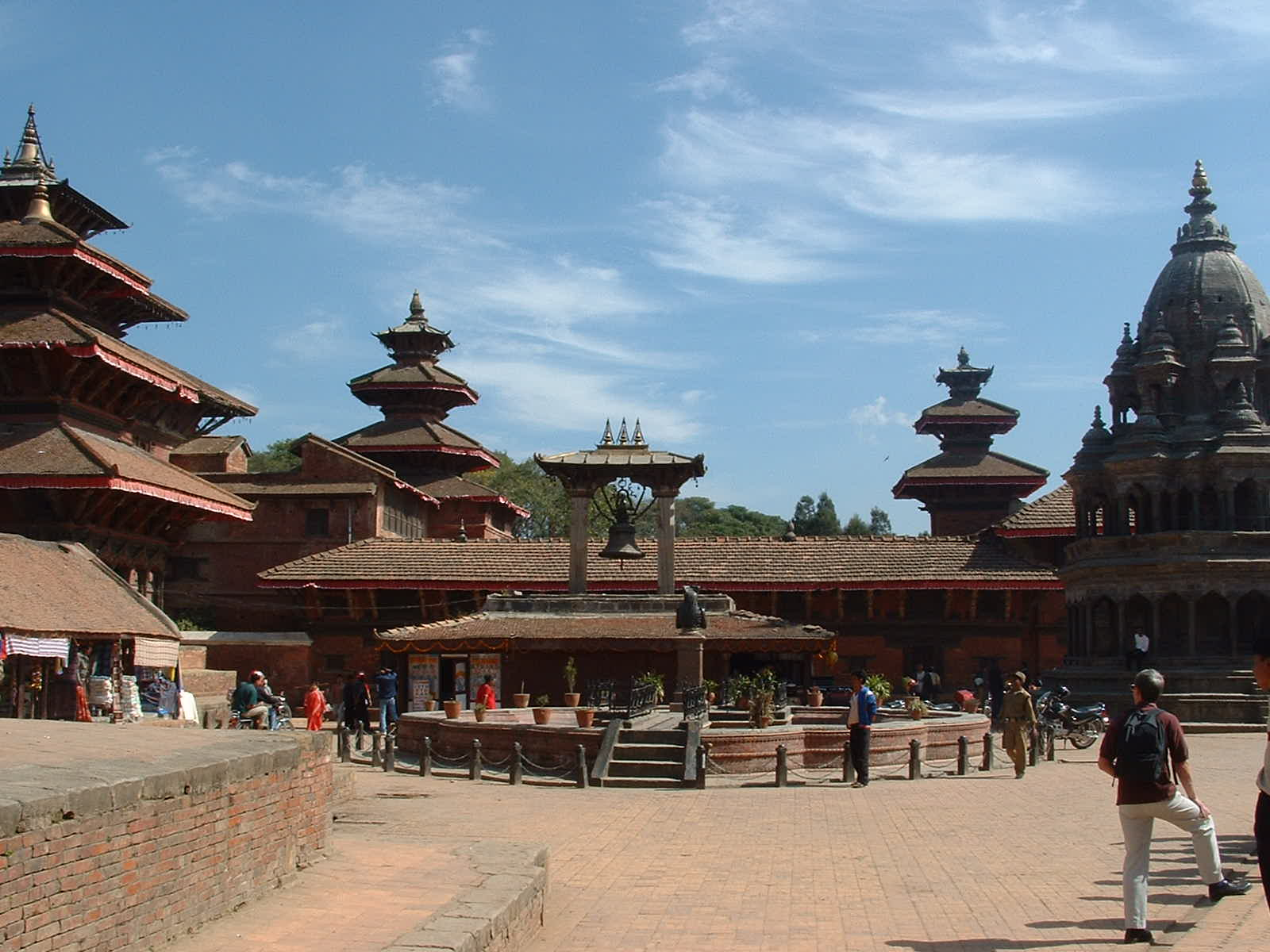
Temples of Patan Durbar Square

Notable landmarks include:

- Patan Durbar Square: The palace square and residence of the Malla rulers of Patan state which now houses a museum.
- Hiranya Varna Mahavihar: A Buddhist temple known locally as Golden Temple.
- Mahabouddha Temple: Also known as 1000 Buddha Temple modeled liked the Mahabodhi Temple in Bodh Gaya.
- Kumbheshwar Temple: A Shiva temple with two ponds whose water is believed to come from Gosaikunda.
- Central Zoo: Central Zoo was established in 1932 by Rana Prime Minister Juddha Shumsher Jang Bahadur Rana as a private zoo, it is the only zoo in entire Nepal.
- Pimbahal Pokhari: This large pond is a hidden gem centred around a charming lakeshore pavilion. On the north side is three-tiered Chandeswari Temple built in 1663. Walk around the pond clockwise and you'll pass a 600-year-old whitewashed stupa that was damaged by Muslim invaders in 1357.
- Balkumari temple

== Transportation ==
=== Airports ===
All international and domestic flights for Kathmandu Valley are handled by Tribhuvan International Airport which lies about 7 km from Patan City Centre.

=== Public transportation ===
Private companies operate a number of routes connecting Patan with other places in the valley. Buses, micro-buses and electric tempos are the most common forms of public transport seen in the city. Lalitpur Yatayat buses connects the touristic Thamel area of Kathmandu with buses stopping at Patan Dhoka, a five-minute walk to Patan Durbar Square. Lagankhel Bus Park is the central transport hub. Sajha Yatayat is another major public vehicle service that connects Lalitpur with its neighboring districts. It also operates electric buses.

== Infrastructure ==
=== Hospitals ===
Patan Hospital is the teaching hospital for the Patan Academy of Health Sciences.

=== Media ===
Radio stations operated out of Lalitpur
S.N	Radio Name	MHz	Operated by
1	Radio Sagarmatha	102.4	Nepal Forum of Environmental Journalist
2	Radio Kantipur FM	96.1	Kantipur FM Pvt. Ltd.
3	BBC Radio	103.0	BBC World Service
4	Ujyaalo FM	90.0	Communication Corner Pvt. Ltd.
5	Times FM	90.6	Valley FM Pvt. Ltd.

== Sport ==
Football and volleyball are the most popular sports among the younger generation in Nepal and there are several stadiums in the city.

Club	Sport	Founded	League
Three Star Club	Football	1974	Martyr's Memorial A-Division League
Friends Club	Football	1972	Martyr's Memorial A-Division League
Jawalakhel Youth Club	Football	1972	Martyr's Memorial A-Division League
Chyasal Youth Club	Football	1981	Martyr's Memorial A-Division League
Lalitpur City FC	Football	2021	Nepal Super League
Lalitpur Patriots	Cricket	2017	Everest Premier League
Lalitpur Queens	Volleyball	2024	Everest Women's Volleyball League

=== Major Sporting Venues ===
- Chyasal Stadium
- ANFA Complex
- Satdobato Swimming Complex

== Language ==
The native language of Patan is Nepal Bhasa of Newars. Though due to the migration of other people from other places to Patan, other languages like Nepali, Tamang, etc. are also spoken.

== International relations and organizations ==
=== Twin towns – sister cities ===
Lalitpur is twinned with:

- Broomfield, United States
- Ulan-Ude, Russia

== Notable people ==
- Dor Bahadur Bista, anthropologist, social scientist and activist who mysteriously disappeared in 1995

== Gallery ==
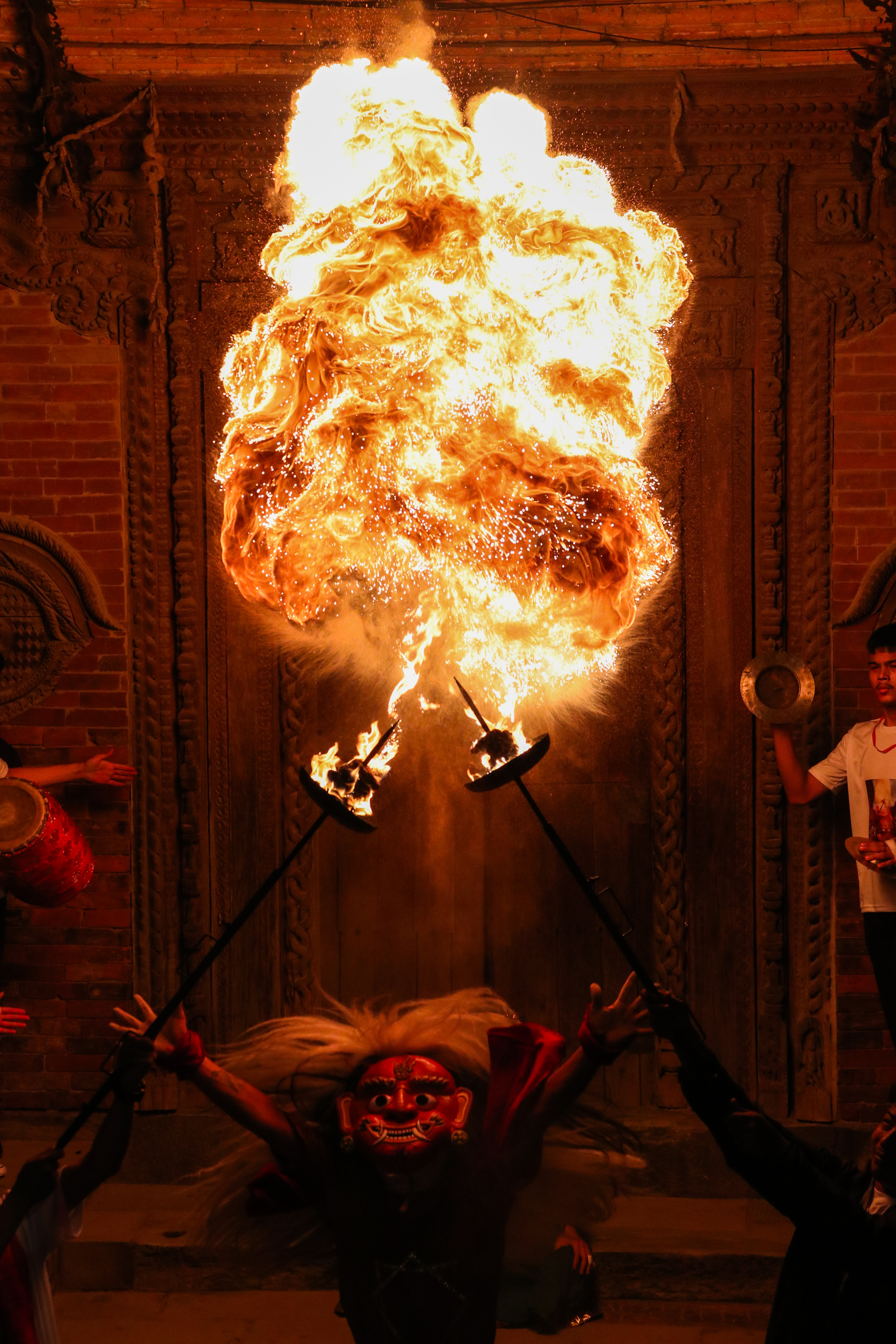
Mipwa Lakhey performing, Patan, Lalitpur, Nepal

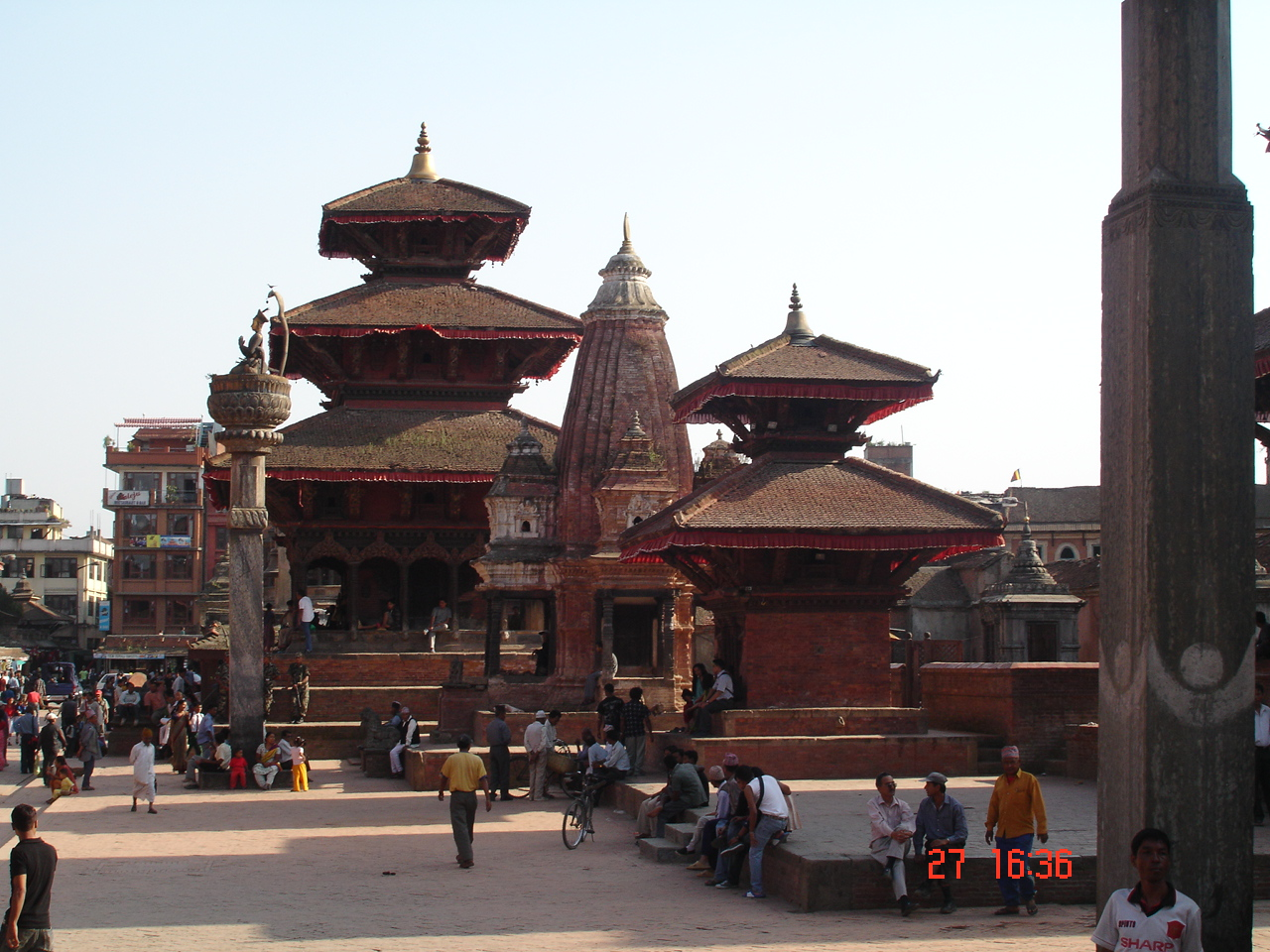
Patan Durbar Square

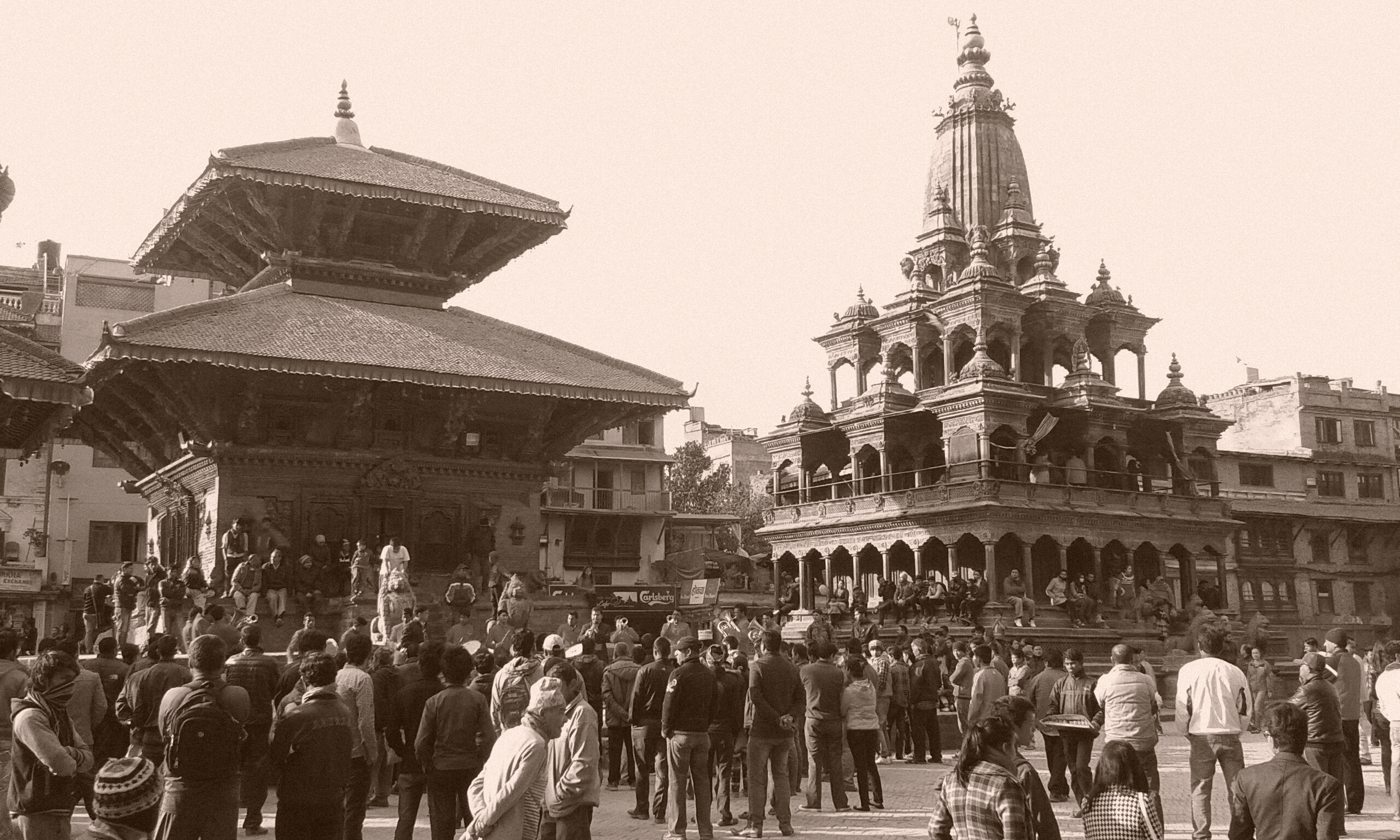
Patan Durbar Square

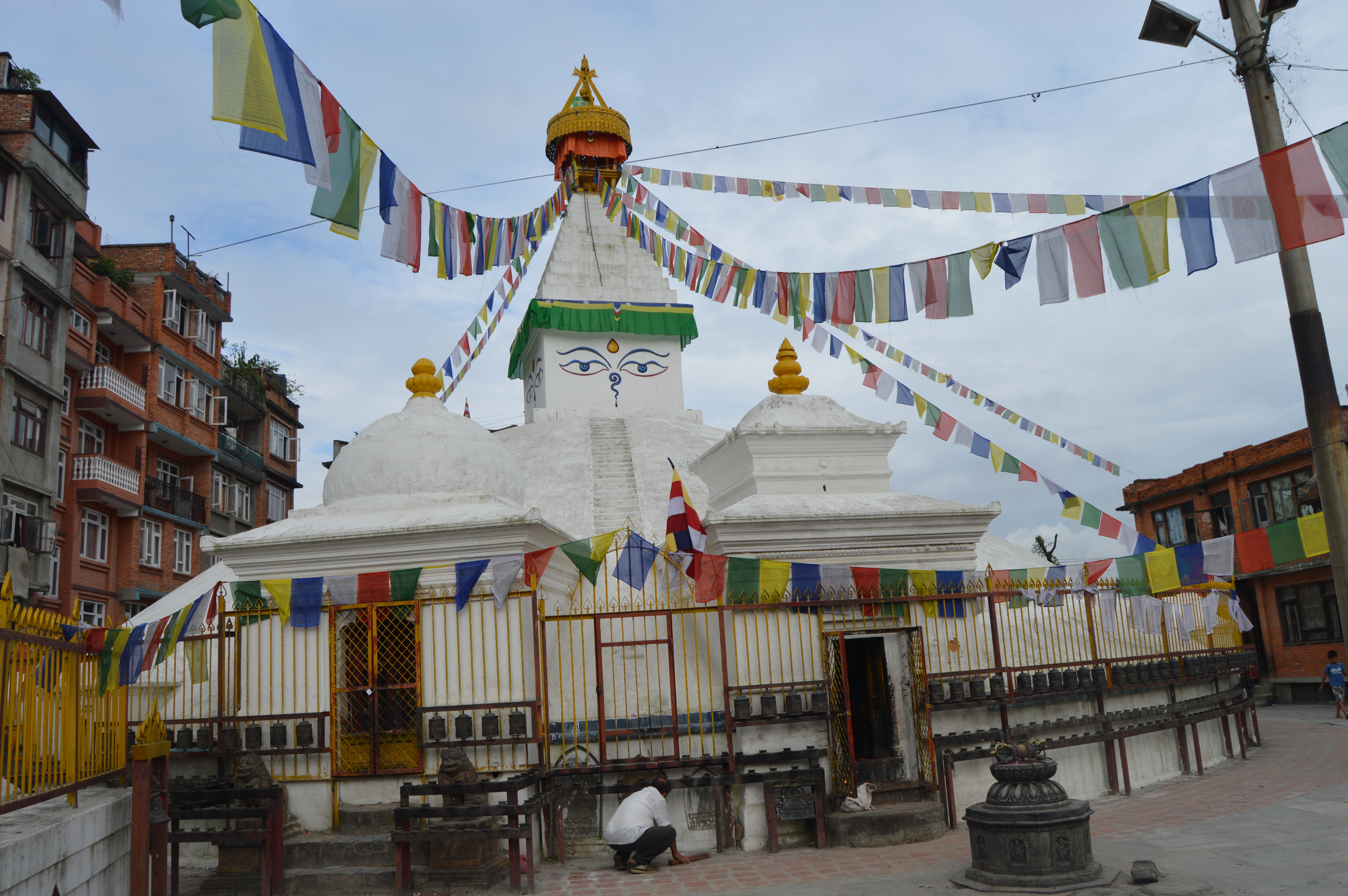
Northern Ashök Stupa

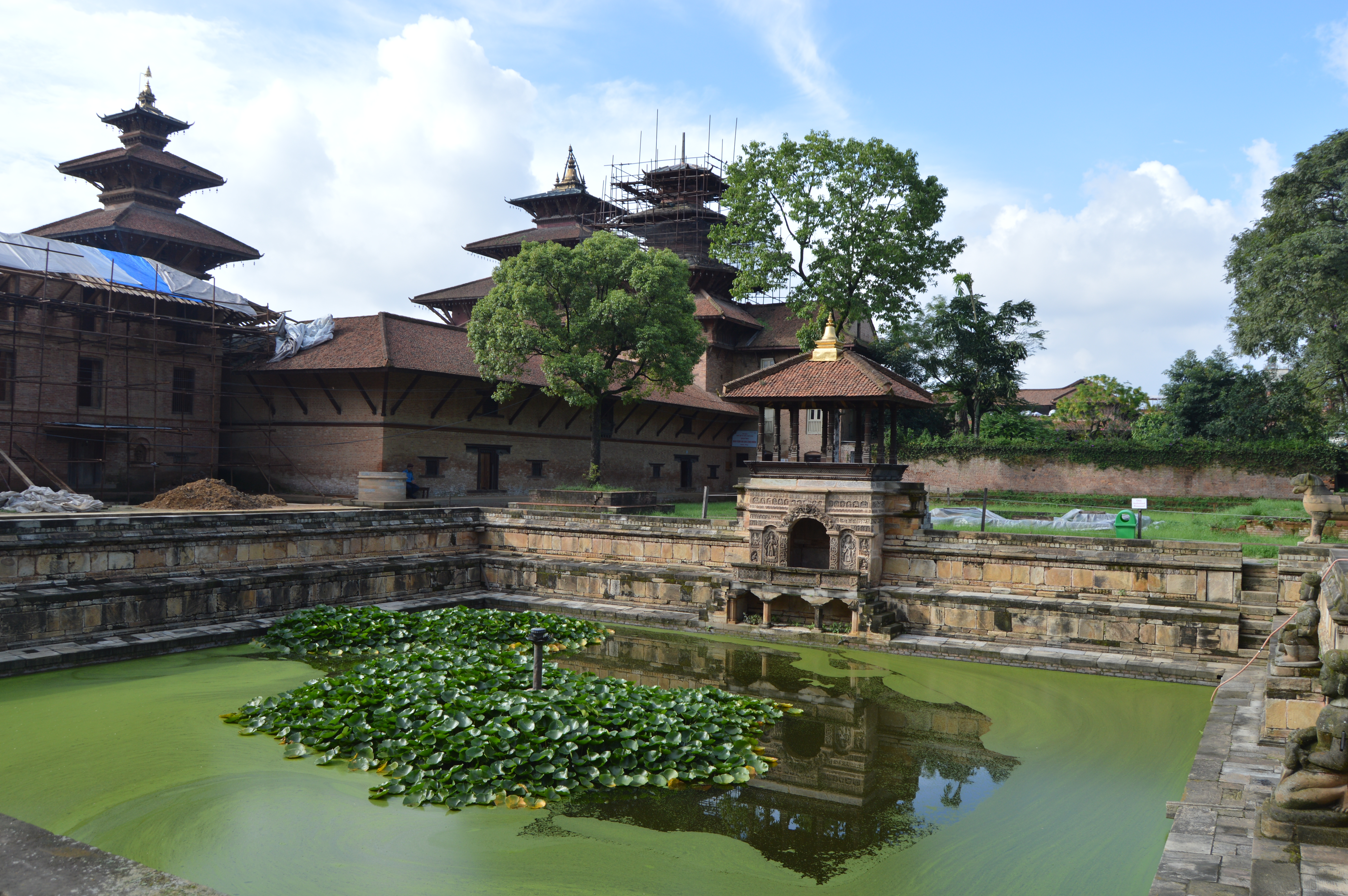
Water tank at Bhandarkhal Garden

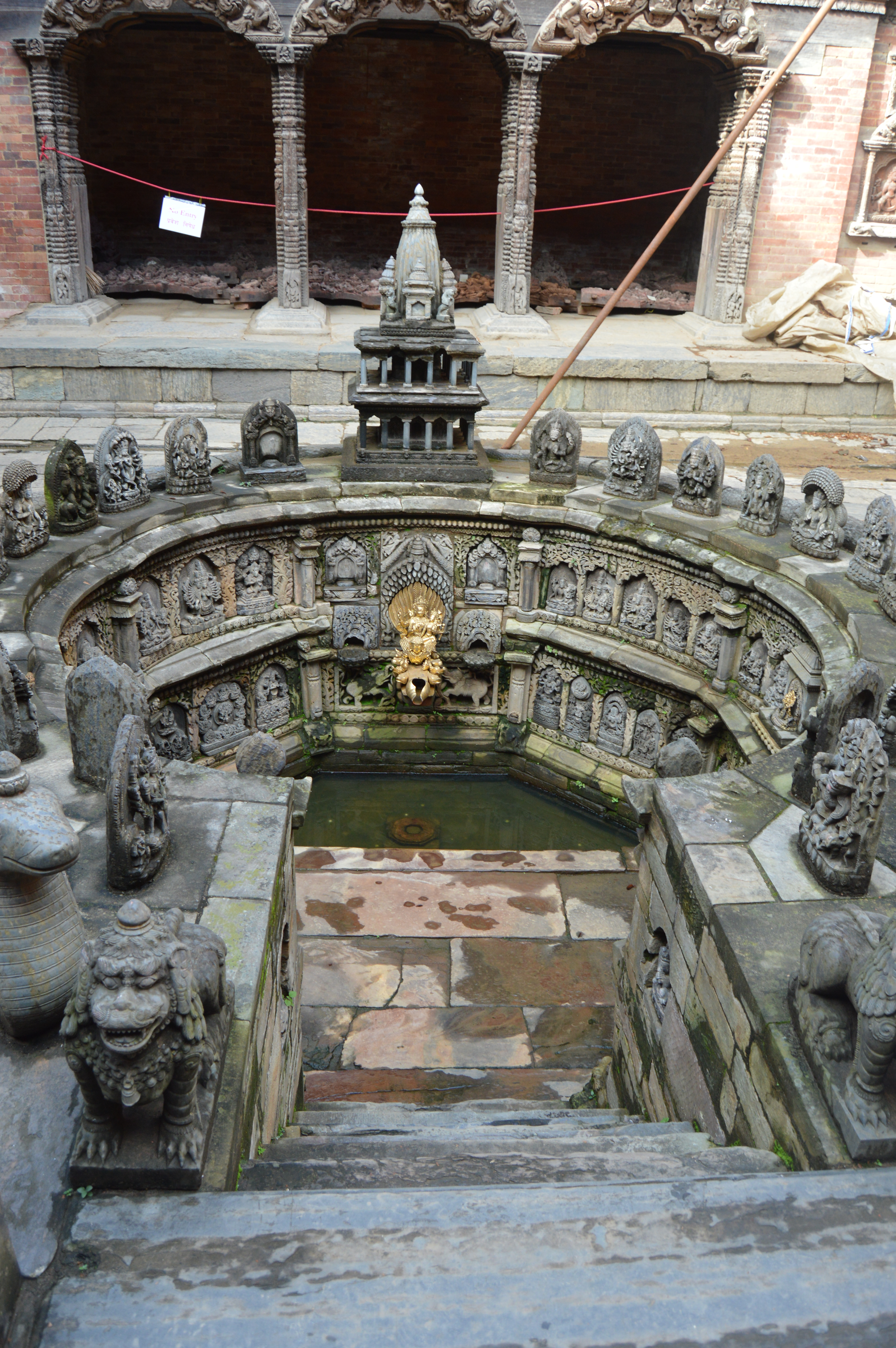
Tusha Hiti

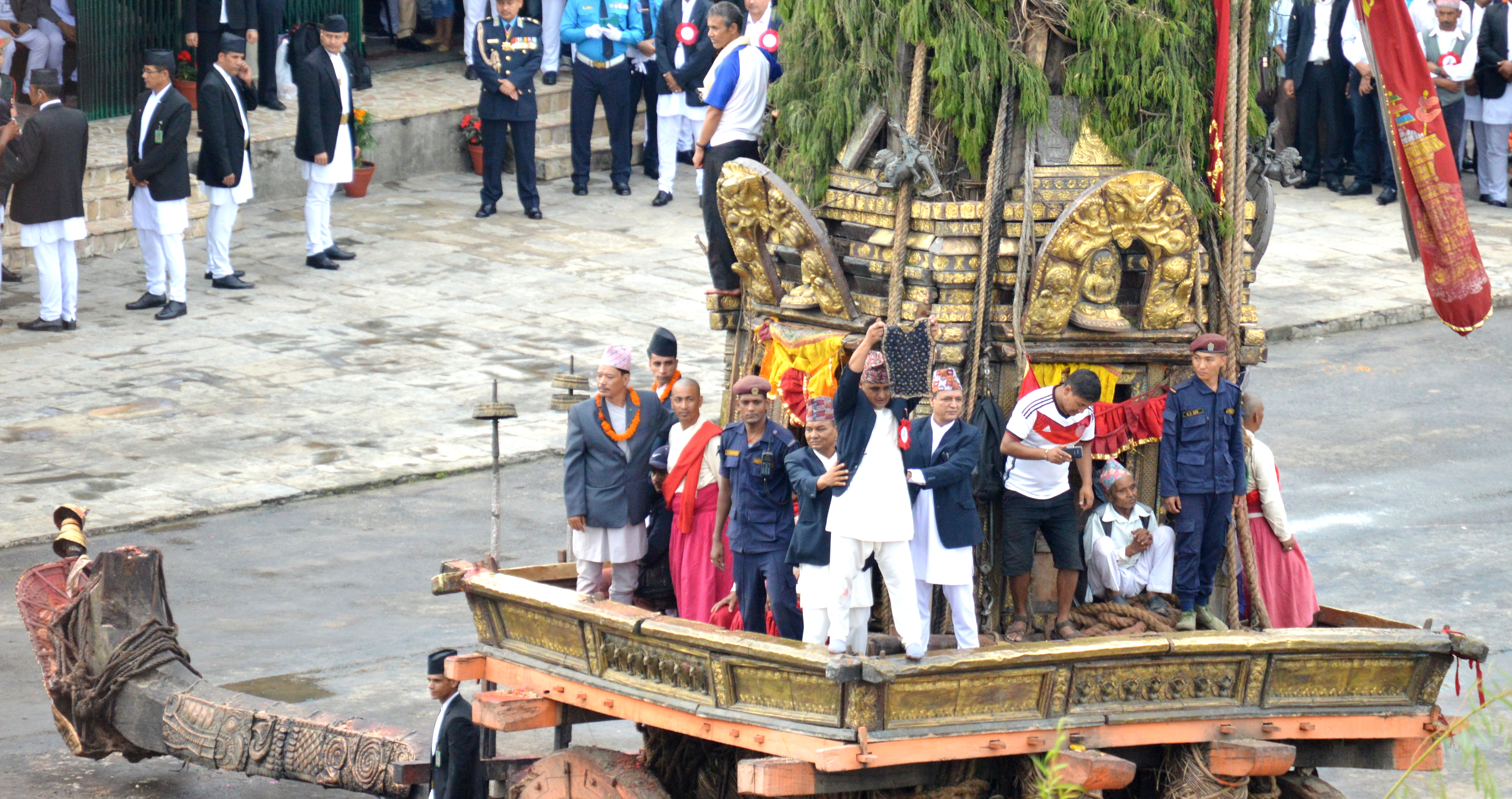
Bhoto Jatra at Jawalakhel, Lalitpur
