= Medical Education Commission =

Nepal government organisation

- Abbreviation: MEC
- Formation: 2018
- Headquarters: Bhaktapur
- Chairperson: Sushila Karki
- Vice Chairperson: Prof. Dr. Anjani Kumar Jha
- Affiliations: Government of Nepal
- Website: Official website

Medical Education Commission (MEC) is a Nepali government agency that has been approved by the Council of Ministers of Nepal and established in 2018 to conduct entrance examinations for educational institutions. As per provision of the National Medical Education Act 2075, in the context of the essence and spirit of the reports of the commission, committee and task force formed to improve medical education at different times. It is chaired by the Prime Minister of Nepal and co-chaired by the Health Minister and Education Minister of Nepal. It was established in year 2018. It conducts entrance examinations for undergraduates and post graduates medical degrees which includes MBBS, MD, MS, DM, MCh.

Anjani Kumar Jha has been appointed as the new Vice-Chairperson of MEC for the period of four years.
