= Western Regional Hospital =

Hospital in Pokhara, Nepal

Western Regional Hospital is the biggest public hospital in Gandaki Province and is located in Ramghat, Ward 10 of Pokhara. The hospital was upgraded to an academy of health sciences in 2015 and now has a teaching hospital called Pokhara Academy of Health Sciences.

== History ==
The institution has undergone a significant transformation through several developmental stages since its founding. It was first established in 1955 as the Soldier Board Hospital, before being handed over to the government in 1962 to serve as the Kaski District Hospital with a 15-bed capacity.

In 1976, the facility merged with INF Shining Hospital, officially becoming the Gandaki Zonal Hospital and expanding to 50 beds. In 1986, the institution was upgraded to the Western Regional Hospital, significantly increasing its reach with 150 beds. Most recently, between 2012 and 2014, the hospital underwent a major expansion to reach its current capacity of 500 beds.

In 2015, the hospital was upgraded to an autonomous academic institution under the Pokhara Academy of Health Sciences Act. It now serves as the teaching hospital for the Pokhara Academy of Health Sciences (PoAHS), offering postgraduate medical programs (MD/MS).
