= Nepalgunj Medical College =

Medical college in Nepalgunj, Nepal

- नेपालगन्ज मेडिकल कलेज
- Type: Private
- Established: 1996; 30 years ago
- Affiliations: Kathmandu University
- Principal: Dr. Anup Sharma
- Location: Kohalpur, Banke, Nepal
- Campus: Urban
- Website: www.ngmc.edu.np

Nepalgunj Medical College (NGMC) is a private medical college in Kohalpur, Nepal. It was established in 1996. The medical college is affiliated with a 750-bed teaching hospital at Kohalpur and a 250-bed hospital at Nepalgunj. The college started its MBBS course in 1997, nursing program in 2000, and postgraduate MD/MS in 2007.

It provides cath lab facilities for heart disease patients.

== See also ==
- Kathmandu University
- Nepal Medical Council
- Kathmandu University
