= Hetauda Hospital =

Government hospital in Hetauda, Bagmati, Nepal

Geography
- Location: Hetauda Sub-metropolitan City, Makwanpur District, Bagmati Province, Nepal
- Coordinates: 27°25′58″N 85°01′39″E

Organisation
- Type: Federal Level Hospital

Services
- Emergency department: Yes
- Beds: 170 beds

History
- Opened: 2016 BS (1959–1960)

Links
- Website: https://hetaudahospital.gov.np

Hetauda Hospital is a government hospital located in Hetauda Sub-metropolitan City, Makwanpur District, Bagmati Province of Nepal.

== History ==
It was established as a 15- bedded District Hospital in 2016 BS (1959–1960), which was then upgraded to 50-beds. After the addition of 50 more beds through the Hospital Management Committee it was operating as a 100 bedded hospital. In 2023, a newly constructed building with 70 beds was inaugurated by the then President of Nepal, Bidhya Devi Bhandari making it a 170 bedded fully operating hospital. It has been brought under Madan Bhandari Academy of Health Sciences recently to improve its condition and service delivery.

== Services ==
The services provided in Hetauda Hospital includes:

- Anesthesiology Department
- Laboratory Department
- Radiology Department
- Emergency Department
- Pharmacy Unit
- Pathology Department
- OPD : Orthopedics, General Surgery, General Medicine, Gynecology, Obstetrics, pediatrics
- ICU
- Psychiatry Department
- NICU
- Postmortem
- Hemodialysis
- HIV/ARV, Family planning, TB-DOTS, Immunization
