= Rapti Academy of Health Sciences =

Autonomous institution in Ghorahi, Lumbini, Nepal

- राप्ती स्वास्थ्य विज्ञान प्रतिष्ठान
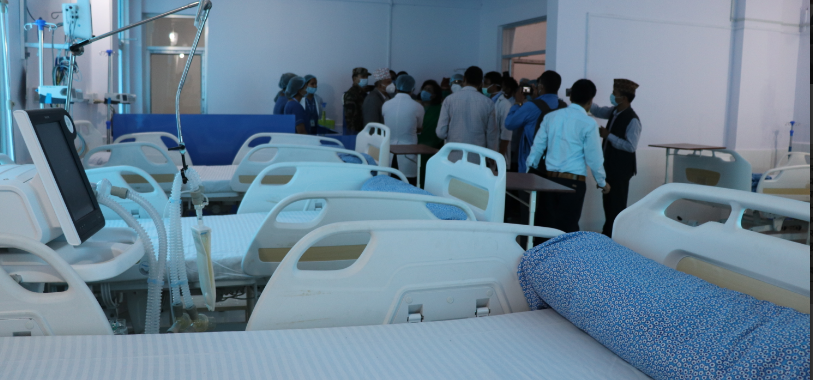
- Type: Deemed
- Established: 2017; 9 years ago
- Chancellor: Prime Minister of Nepal
- Vice-Chancellor: Dr. Ajay Kumar Mishra
- Location: Ghorahi, Dang, Nepal; 28.0375078°N 82.4921895°E
- Website: rahs.edu.np

The Rapti Academy of Health Sciences (RAHS; Nepali: राप्ती स्वास्थ्य विज्ञान प्रतिष्ठान) is an autonomous institution located in Ghorahi, Dang in Lumbini Province of Nepal. Following the government's decision to open one state-owned medical college in each province, the legislature parliament of Nepal unanimously endorsed the Rapti Health Science Academy Bill 2074 on 10 October 2017. The academy mostly serves people from Lumbini Province and Karnali Province.

== History ==
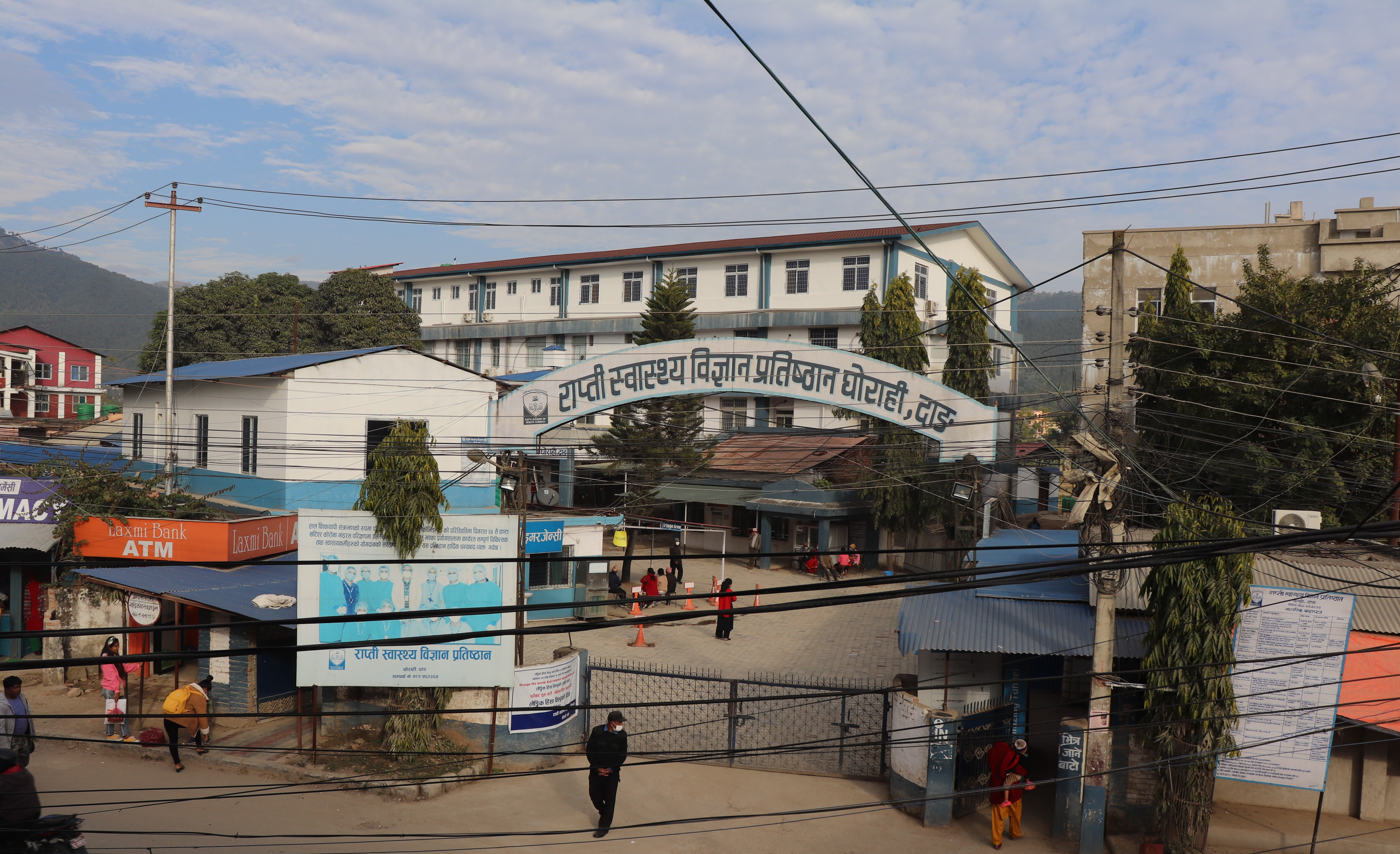
Rapti Academy of Health Sciences (RAHS) was established in 2017 AD (2074 BS) as a state-hold entity located in Rapti Sub-regional Hospital-14, Ghorahi, Dang district of Nepal.

It was established as a Health center in 2016 BS (1959–1960), which was then upgraded as a 15 bedded Mahendra Hospital in 2021 BS (1964–1965). Whereas, in 2050 BS (1993–1994) it was extended to 25 bedded hospital, then to 50 bedded in 2064 BS (2007–2008). The hospital was advanced as Rapti Sub-regional Hospital in 2065 BS (2008–2009). Later, the number of beds were upgraded from 50 to 100 in 2071 BS (2014–2015) by the Government of Nepal . In 2074 BS (2017–2018) Rapti Sub-regional Hospital was promoted to Rapti Academy of Health Sciences and currently is a 300 bedded tertiary level hospital.

== Departments ==
According to the centre, provided facilities include.

- OPD Service: Orthopedics, Surgery, Pediatrics, Medicine and Geriatrics, Dermatology, Psychiatric, ENT-HNS, Obstetrics And Gynecology, Anesthesiology And Critical Care, Ophthalmology, and Forensic Medicine
- Inpatient Service
- Safe Motherhood Program
- Pharmacy Department
- Emergency Department
- Physiotherapy And Rehabilitation
- Dialysis Service
- ECHO And Endoscopy
- Nutrition Rehabilitation Center
- One Stop Crisis Management Center (OCMC)
- DOTS Clinic
- ART Clinic
- CSSD
- Sansthagat Clinic
- Social Service Unit (SSU)
- Health insurance program
- ICU
- Radiology and Medical Imaging Department
- Laboratory Services
- Histopathology Department
- Dental Department

== Academics ==
It has started its own School of Nursing, which runs nursing programs of all levels including Bachelor of Nursing Science and BSc Nursing. It also runs its own School of Public Health which offers MPH degree. It also provides Masters level of degree on Obstetrics and Gynecology, Orthopedics, General Practice. The Medical Education Commission of Nepal has allotted undergraduate seats for MBBS degree from academic year 2025.

Total Seats
S. No.	Courses	Seats
1	BACHELOR OF SCIENCE IN NURSING	30
2	BACHELOR IN NURSING SCIENCE	20
3	MBBS	50
4	POST GRADUATE	4

== Journal of the Academy ==
The academy publishes a journal, the Journal of Rapti Academy of Health Sciences (JRAHS), which provides a platform for researchers, educationists and education administrators to publish their works.
