= Karnali Academy of Health Sciences =

Hospital in Jumla, Karnali, Nepal

- कर्णाली स्वास्थ्य विज्ञान प्रतिष्ठान
- Type: Deemed
- Established: 2011
- Chancellor: Prime Minister of Nepal
- Vice-Chancellor: Dr. Suryaman Menyangbo
- Location: Jumla, Karnali, Nepal, Nepal
- Website: kahs.edu.np

Karnali Academy of Health Sciences (KAHS) (Nepali: कर्णाली स्वास्थ्य विज्ञान प्रतिष्ठान) is an autonomous medical institution of Government of Nepal established by an Act of parliament of Nepal on 20 October 2011. This academy provides medical service in the Karnali Province which is considered to be lagging behind in health facilities. It runs own government hospital in Jumla district.

In December 2021, a post graduate course was started by the academy. The teaching facility has capacity of 50 students per year. As per the government rules, 45% of the seats is reserved for the students from Jumla, Humla, Dolpa, Kalikot, Mugu, Jajarkot, Bajura, Bajhang and Achham districts. The 300 bed teaching hospital at Jumla was completed in 2017 but remained closed due to lack of equipment and medical professionals.

== See also ==
- List of hospitals in Nepal
