= Patan Hospital =

Patan Hospital पाटन स्वास्थ्य विज्ञान प्रतिष्ठान

Geography
- Location: Lalitpur, Nepal
- Coordinates: 27.668450°N 85.320551°E

Organisation
- Care system: Public
- Type: Teaching, District General

Services
- Emergency department: Yes
- Beds: 450

History
- Founded: 1982

Links
- Website: www.patanhospital.org.np
- Lists: Hospitals in Nepal

The Patan Hospital (Nepali: पाटन स्वास्थ्य विज्ञान प्रतिष्ठान) is a teaching hospital for the Patan Academy of Health Sciences. Patan Hospital is one of the largest hospitals in Nepal. It uses modern equipment and facilities to provide treatment for almost 320,000 outpatients and 20,000 inpatients every year. Patan Hospital staff conduct more than 10,000 operations annually.

The hospital has been operating with an annual revenue of around US$3.5 million.

It serves people from every district of Nepal, from the remote villages as well as from the Kathmandu valley. Patan Hospital has 320 beds, which has increased to 450, after the completion of its maternity ward building construction.

== Services offered ==
- 24-Hour Emergency Service
- Inpatient Medical and Surgical care
- Obstetrics and Gynecology
- Birthing Center
- Pediatrics
- Orthopedics
- Psychiatry
- ENT
- Dentistry
- Dermatology
- Intensive Care Unit
- Outpatient Services
- Emergency medicine service
- General Practice clinics
- Private Clinic
- Pathology Services
- Imaging and Radiology Services
- Same Day Surgery
- Community Outreach Programs
- Cath lab services

== See also ==
This essay is also found in the spoken version:
