= Madan Bhandari Academy of Health Sciences =

Autonomous institution in Hetauda, Bagmati, Nepal

Madan Bhandari Academy of Health Sciences, Hetauda Hospital
- मदन भण्डारी स्वास्थ्य बिज्ञान प्रतिष्ठान,हेटौडा अस्पताल
- Type: Deemed
- Established: 2018; 8 years ago
- Chancellor: Indra Baniya
- Location: Hetauda, Nepal; 27.427959°N 84.9427204°E
- Vice Chancellor: Prof. Dr. Pradip Gyanwali
- Website: mbahs.edu.np

Madan Bhandari Academy of Health Sciences,Hetauda, Hospital (MBAHS; Nepali: मदन भण्डारी स्वास्थ्य विज्ञान प्रतिष्ठान,हेटौडा अस्पताल) is an autonomous institution located in Hetauda in Bagmati Province of Nepal. Following the Provincial Act, 2018 guided by Madan Bhandari’s envision of social equity in health legislature parliament of Nepal unanimously established the Madan Bhandari Academy of Health Sciences People from the 13 districts of Bagmati Province are aimed to be highly benefitted by the health services provided in MBAHS. It is one of the few medical centers of Nepal where, Kidney Transplantation is done.

== History ==
It was established by the joint initiative of the then Chief Minister of Bagmati Province, Dormani Poudel, Minister of Social Development of Bagmati Province, Nepal Yuvaraj Dulal and Honorable Prime Minister of Nepal K.P. Sharma Oli, President of Nepal Bidhya Devi Bhandari in 2018.

== Hospital ==
It is the governing body of the Hetauda Hospital.

== Academics ==
It has started its own academic program for B.Sc. Nursing, Bachelor of Public Health, BSc. MLT., B Pharmacy.

== Journal of the Academy ==
The academy publishes a journal, the Nepal Journal of Health Sciences (NJHS) which provides a platform for researchers, educationists and education administrators to publish their works.
