= Bagiya =

Dumpling delicacy in India and Nepal

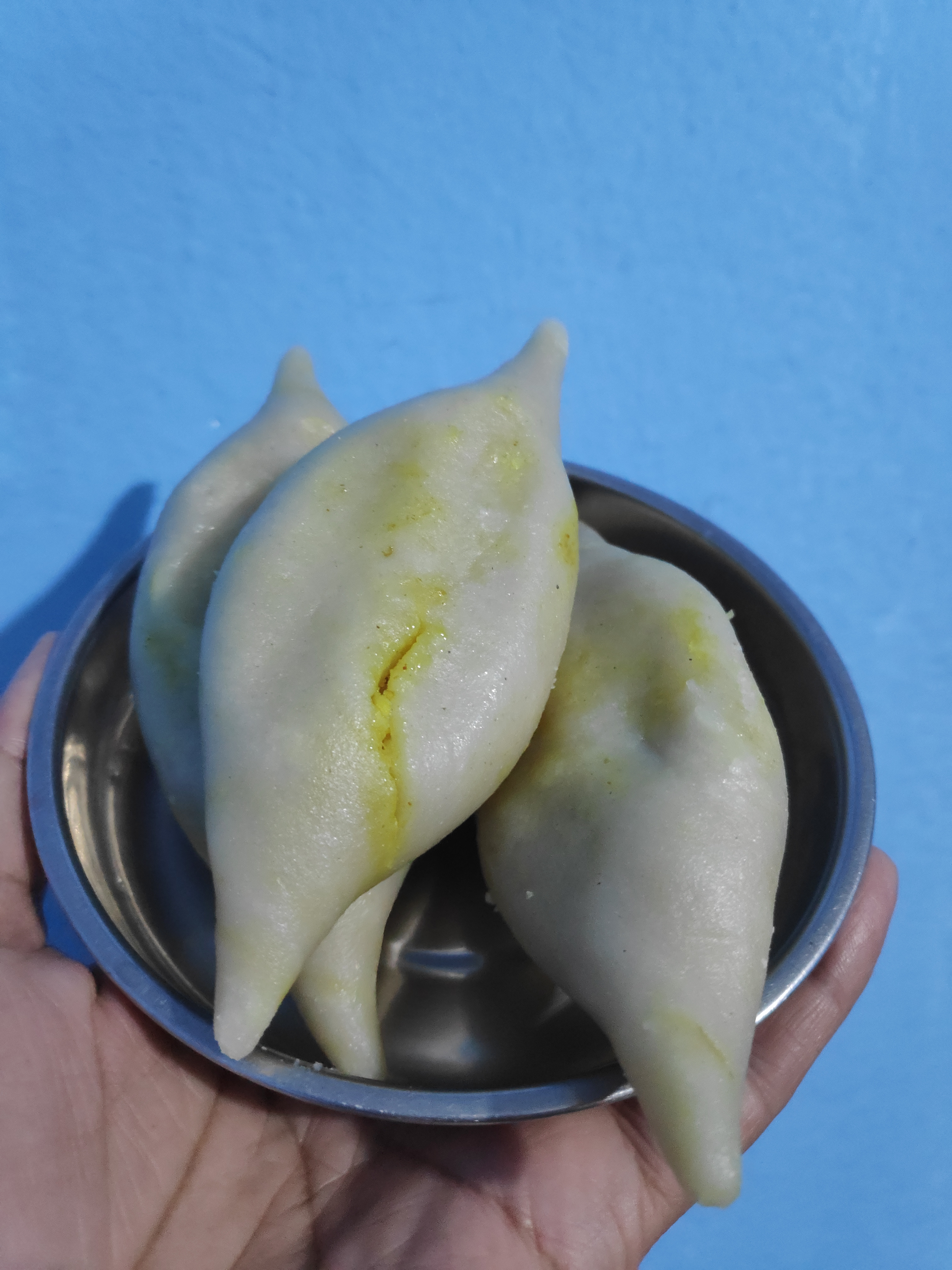
- Region or state: Mithila, Nepal (Madhesh, Koshi) and India (Bihar)
- Associated cuisine: Maithil cuisine
- Main ingredients: rice flour and stuffings (lentils specially black gram)

Bagiya (also called Pithha) is a delicacy of the Maithils, Tharu and Dhimal communities of India and Nepal. It is a steamed dumpling that consists of an external covering of rice flour and an inner content of sweet substances such as chaku, vegetables and other fried items. The delicacy plays a very important role in Madhesi and Tharu society, and is a key part of the festival of Diwali (also known as Deepawali or Tihar) on the day of Laxmi Puja.

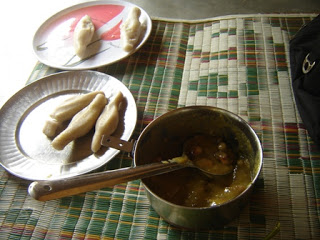
Bagiya

== See also ==
- Indian Cuisine
- Dhikri
- Yomari
- List of Nepalese dishes
