= Mokha art =

Traditional endemic art of the Tharu people

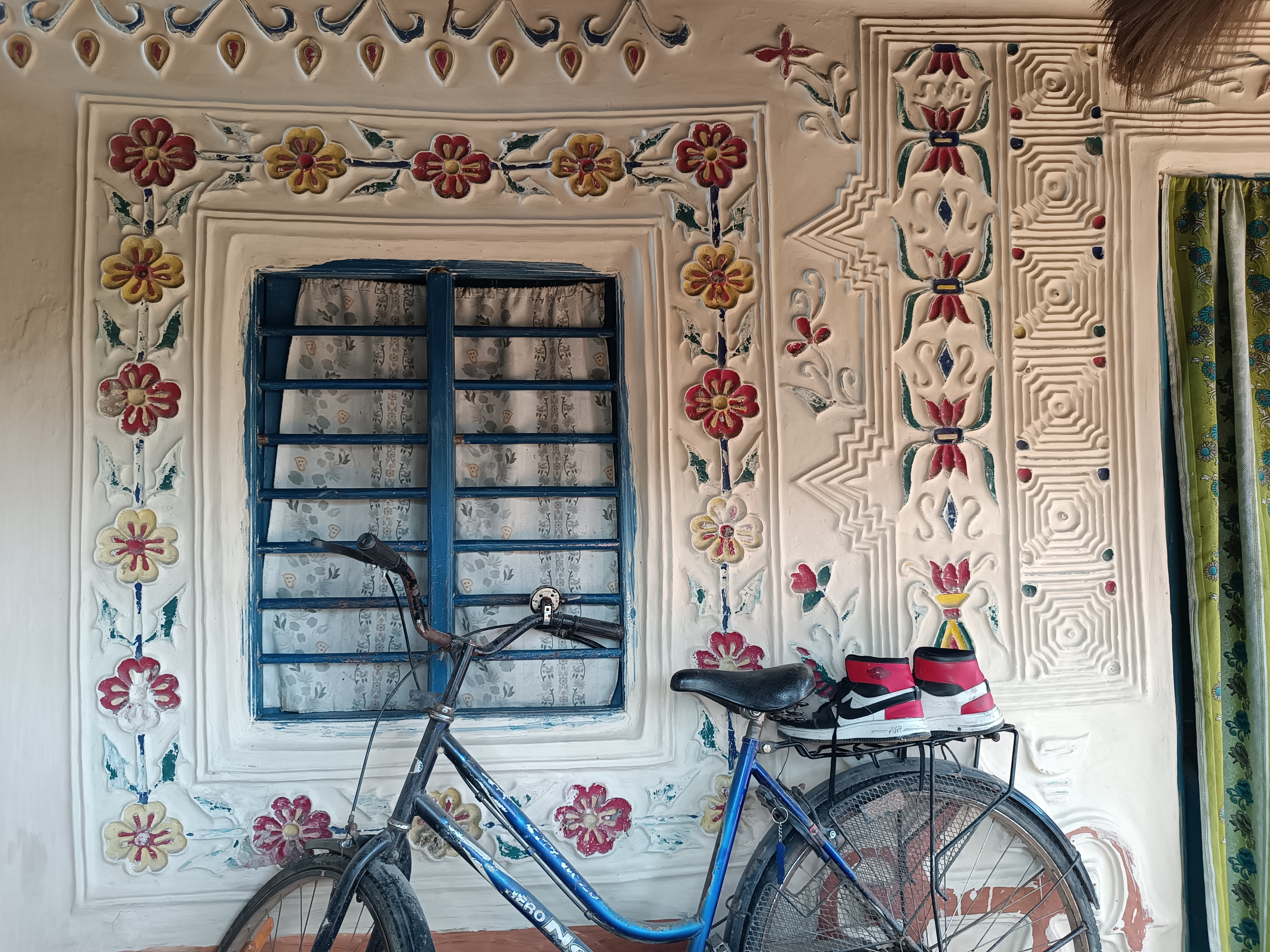
Mokha art of Tharus of Eastern Nepal

Mokha is a popular endemic art of Tharu community of eastern Nepal. The women, especially from Morang, Sunsari, Saptari, Siraha and Udayapur districts of eastern Nepal, decorate their mud walls with beautiful floral and geometric patterns including birds and animals.

Tharu houses are often built of bamboo-lattice with mud-plaster walls. The women daub the walls with mixture of clay from the pond, cow dung, rice bran and straw. Applying layers of clay, mixed with jute they come up with intricate designs floral and geometric patterns, parrots and peacocks, elephants and horses, among many other beautiful motifs, patterns around the windows and both sides of the doors.

When the design dries, they apply a layer of white clay to it. Then they use natural colours to give them a facelift. Adding a little milk to the colours ensures they don't wear off quickly. This ingenious idea stops them from cracking in the future.

The mokha art, also called Payar in Saptari, Siraha and Udayapur districts, are made and coloured during special occasions like marriage and festivals.

== Significance ==
Mokha art’s sculpted bas-relief designs aim to attract visitors and welcome guests. Well decorated house displaying mokha art is still known as a house having lucky women. Tharus believe that if they spot a peacock when they first step out of their home, they will be favoured with good luck that day. The Tharu communities of the East also use mokha to showcase goddess Laxmi, ahead of Tihar (Diwali) – festival of light. This art, along with its techniques, processes, motifs, and patterns, has been passed down from one generation to the next. Women typically inherit this knowledge from their mothers and grandmothers.

== Gallery ==
Mokha art

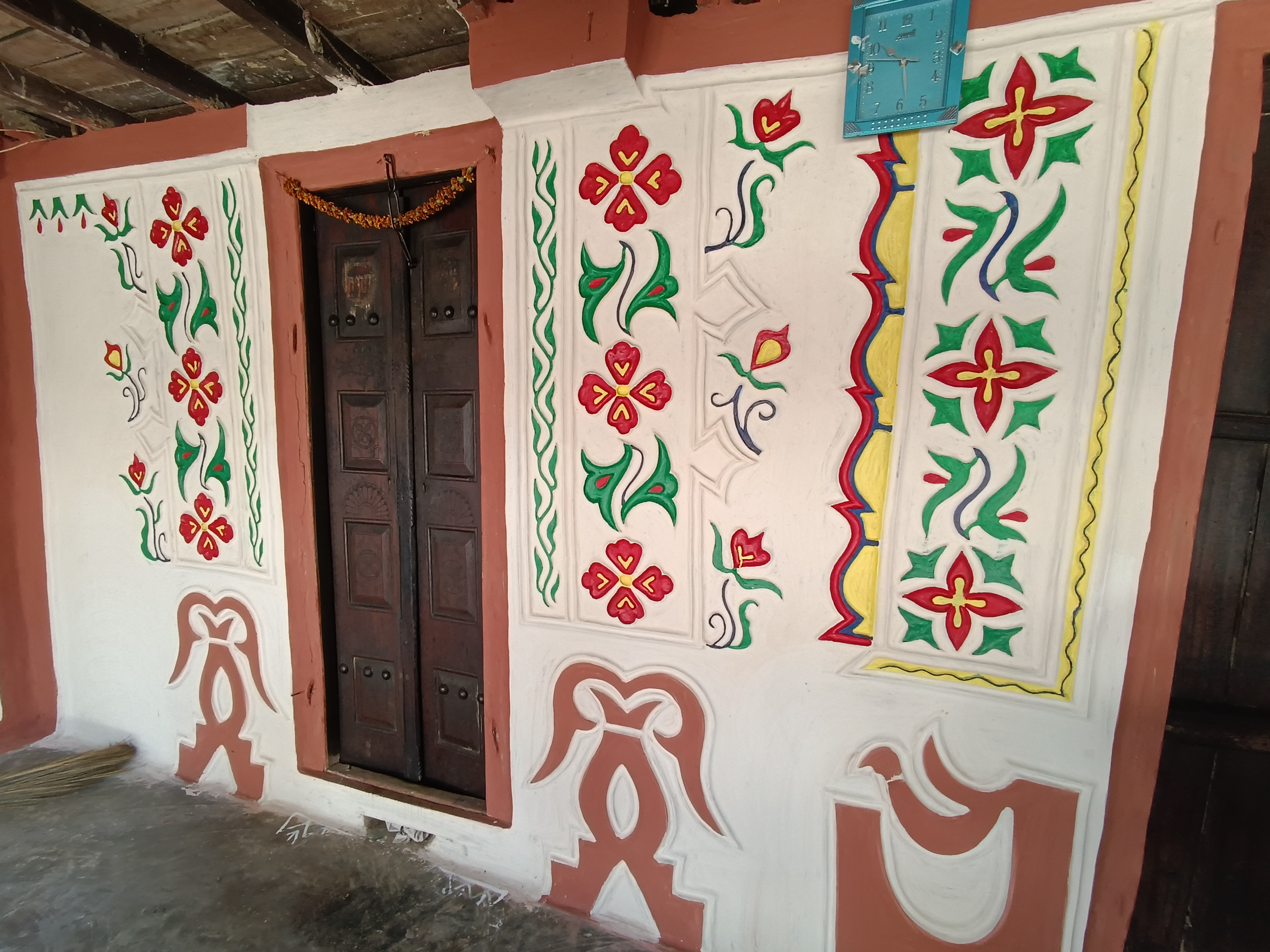

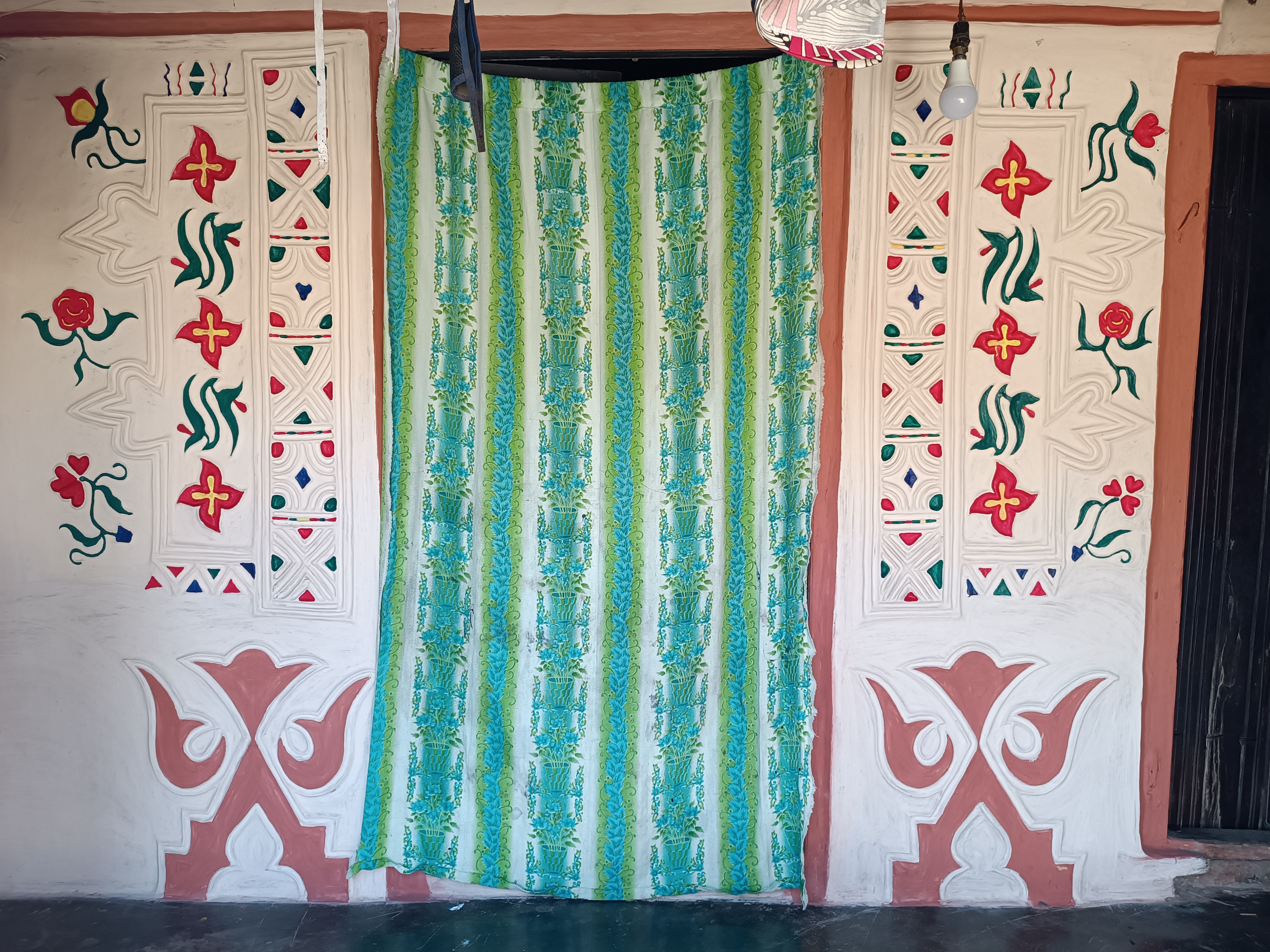

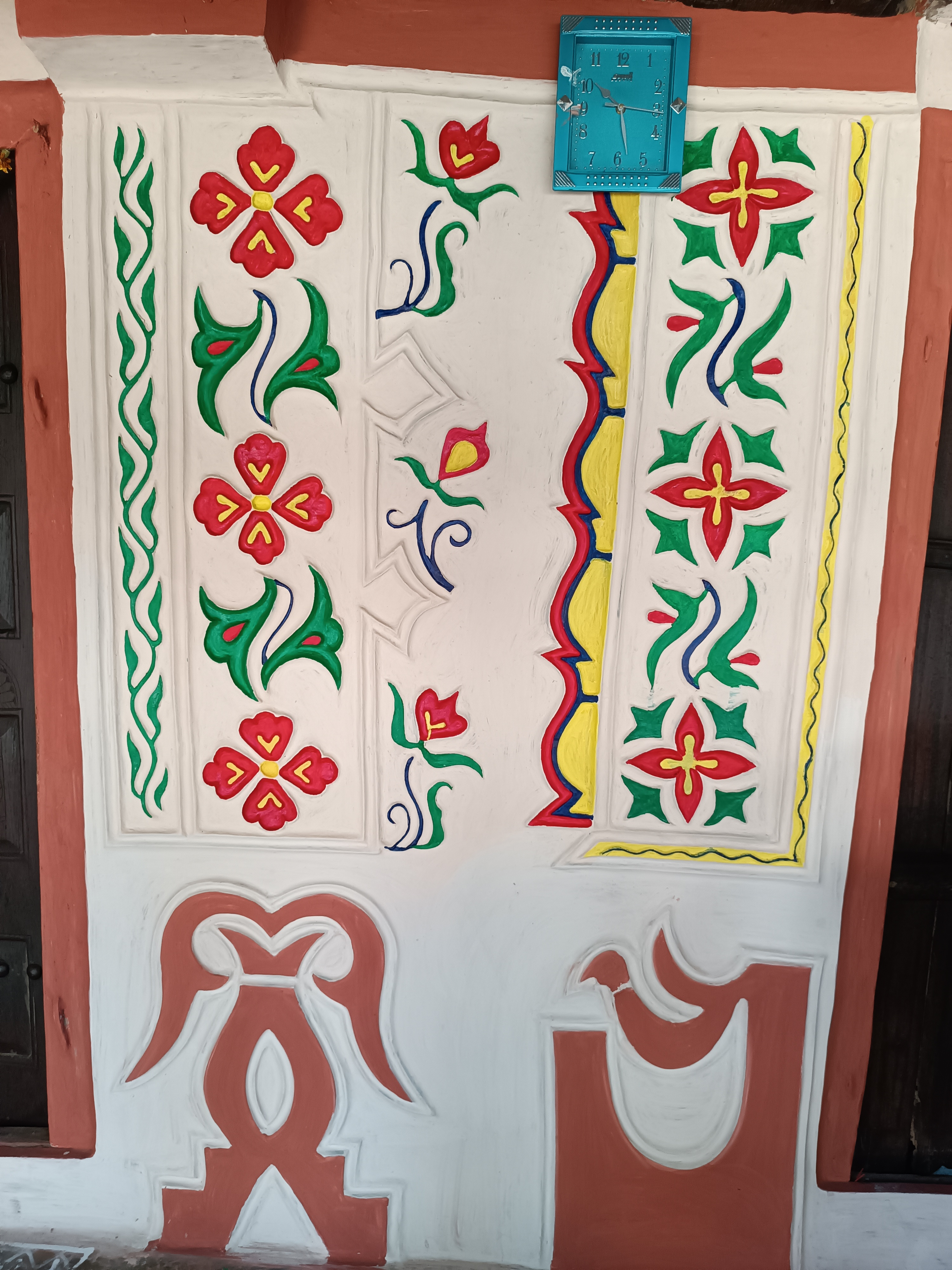

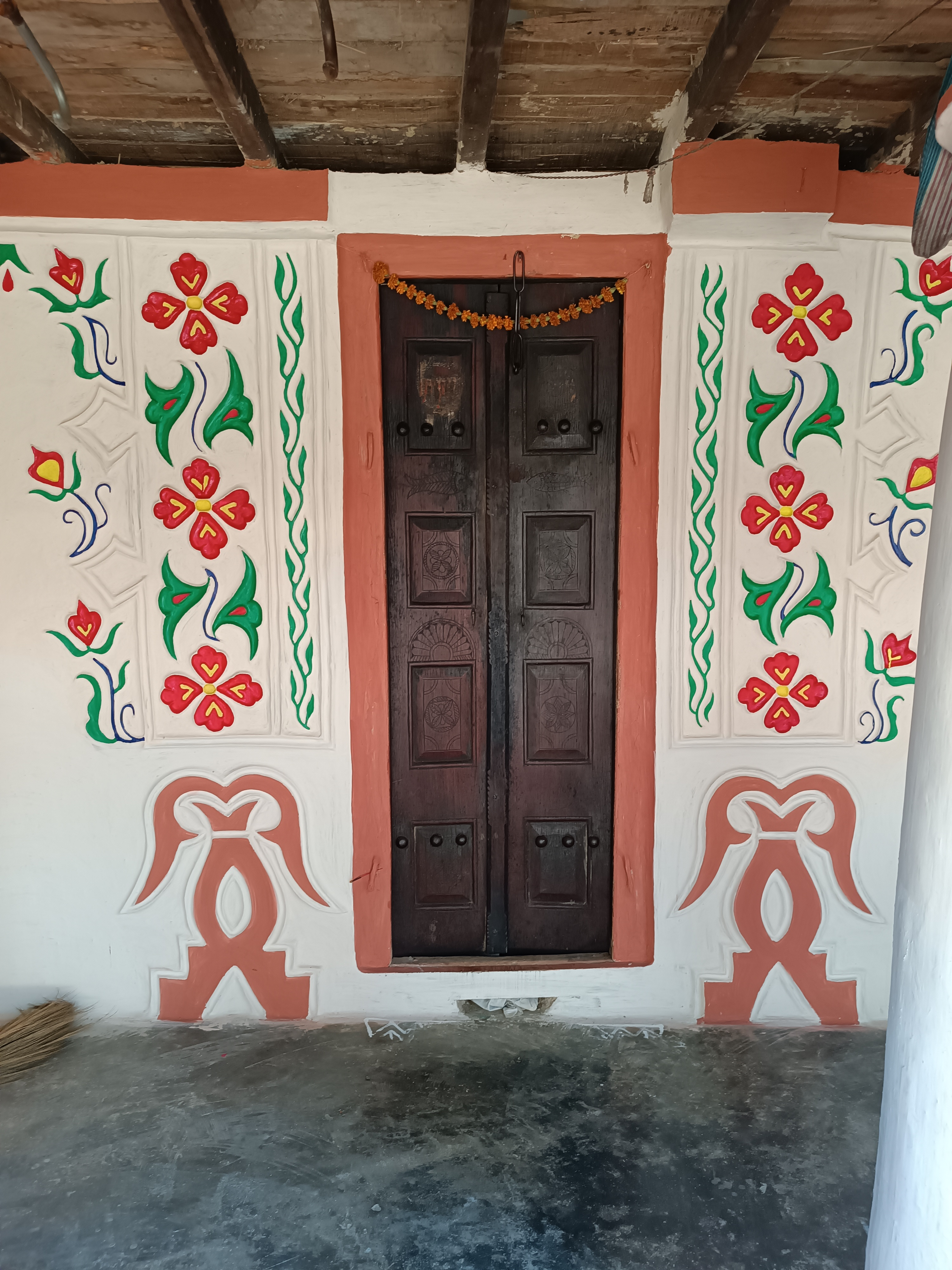

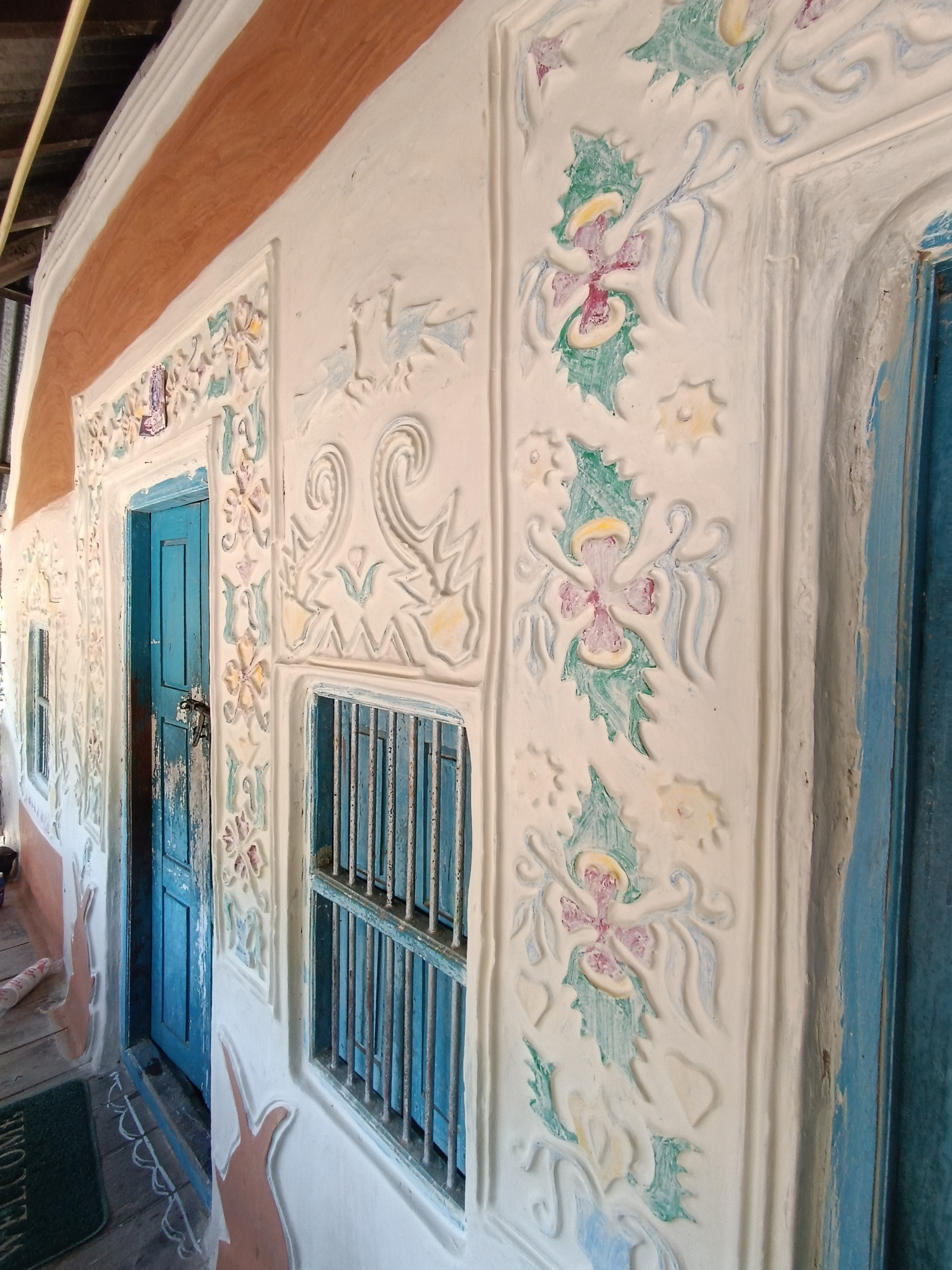

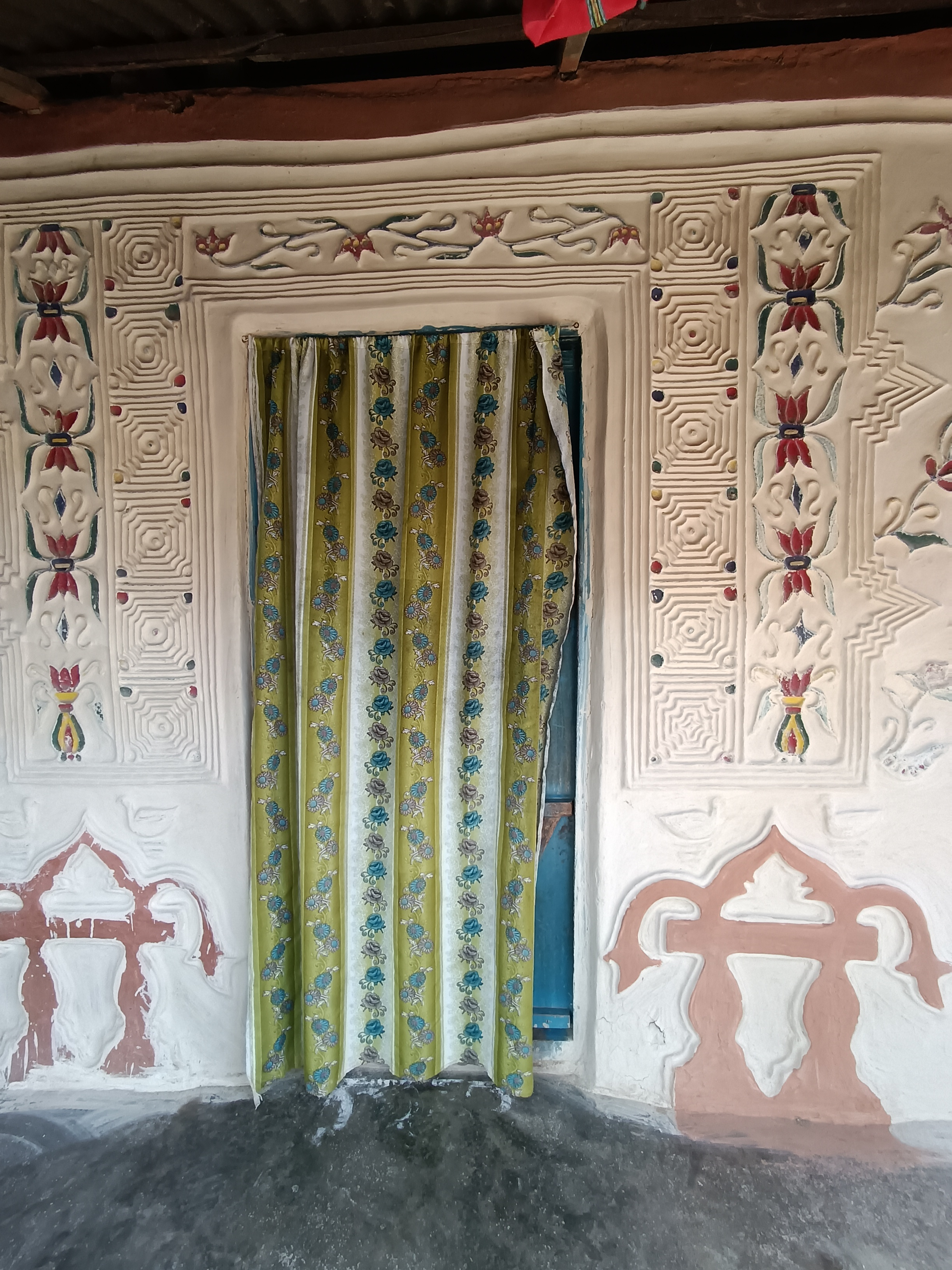

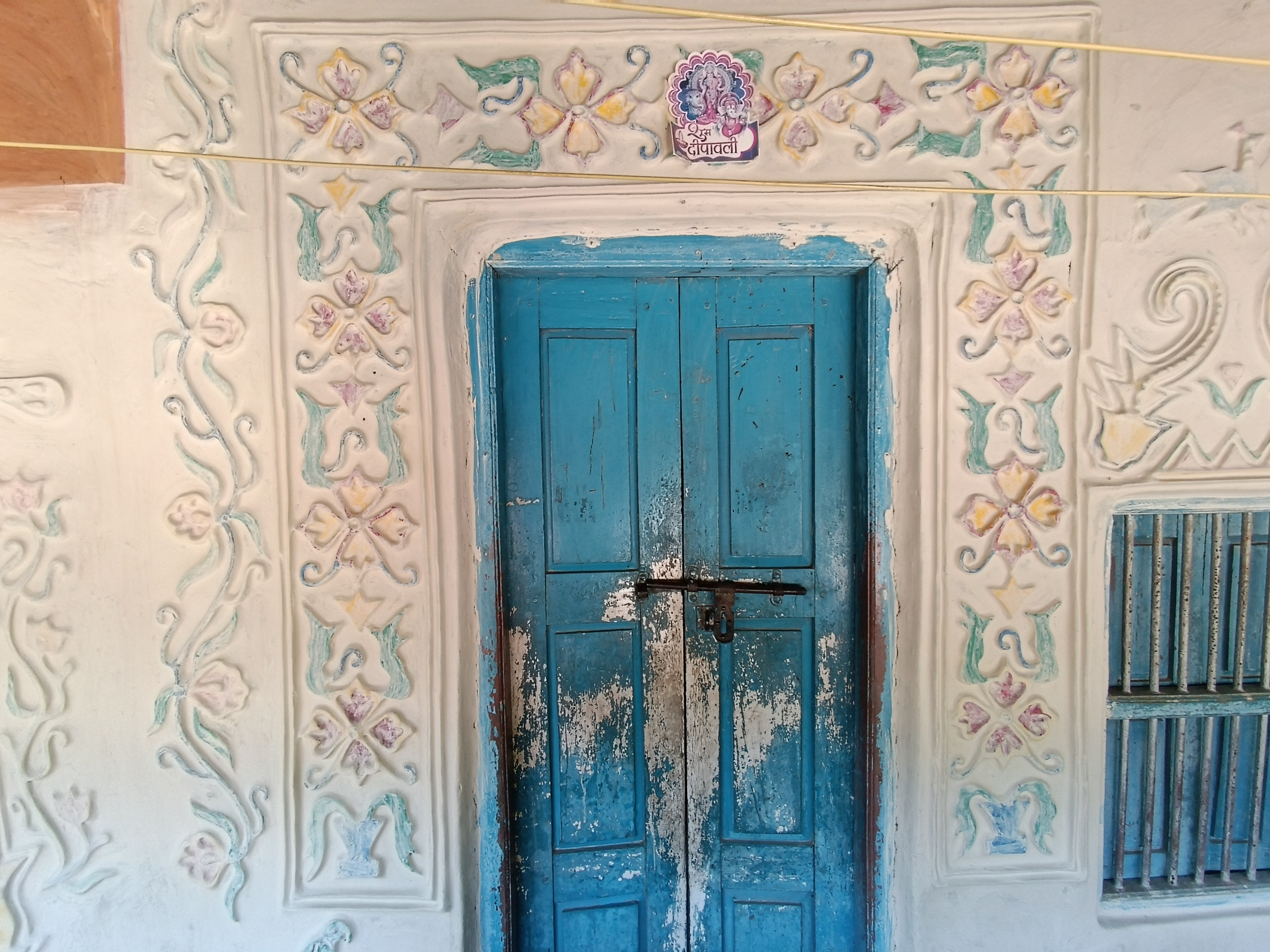

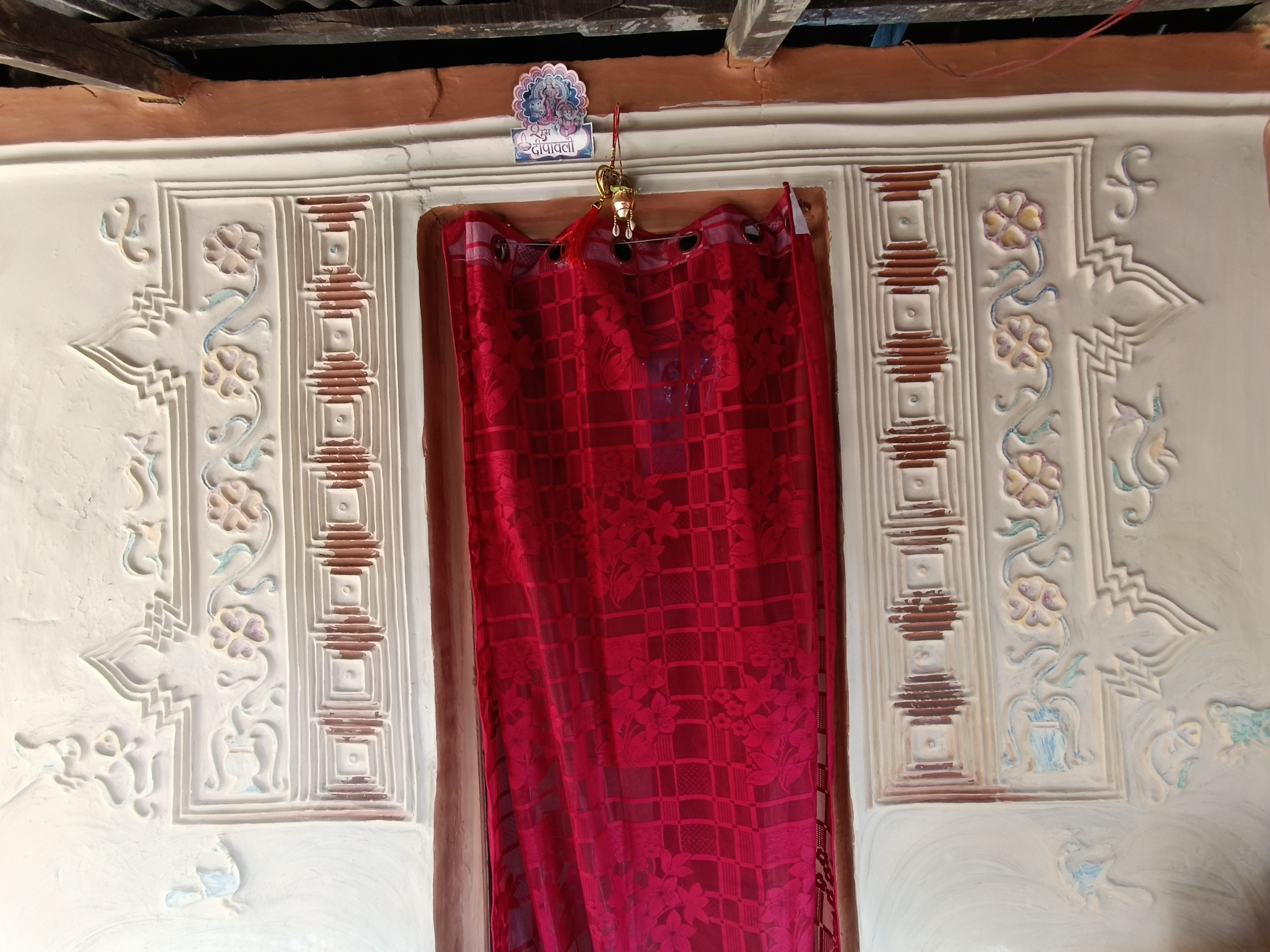

== See also ==
- Ashtimki painting
- Madhubani art
- Paubha
