= Atwari =

Big Festival from Nepal

Atwari is a sacred festival observed by the Tharu people, predominantly in the western Terai region of Nepal. During the festival, the Tharu people venerate Bhima and offer prayers to the Surya, aspiring to embody Bhima's strength in their traditions. The festival is traditionally celebrated on second Sunday after Krishna Janmashtami (Ashtimki)in Nepal. In that day brothers fast for their sister's and pray for their wellbeing, good health and prosperity.It also holds significant importance for the Tharu, being the second-largest festival after Maghi in western Nepal.
