= Stick dance =

Stick dance may refer to:

- Stick dance (African-American), a dance developed by American slaves
- Emirati stick dance, a traditional group dance of United Arab Emirates and Oman
- Ball de bastons, a European ritual dance
- Dandiya Raas, a dance of Gujarat origin
- Jocul cu bâtă, a Romanian folk dance
- Laathi nach, also known as the Tharu stick dance
- Soke (dance), a Tongan folk dance
- Tahtib, an Egyptian folk dance
- Tirere, a dance in Kiribati
