= Dhikri =

Nepalese rice cake

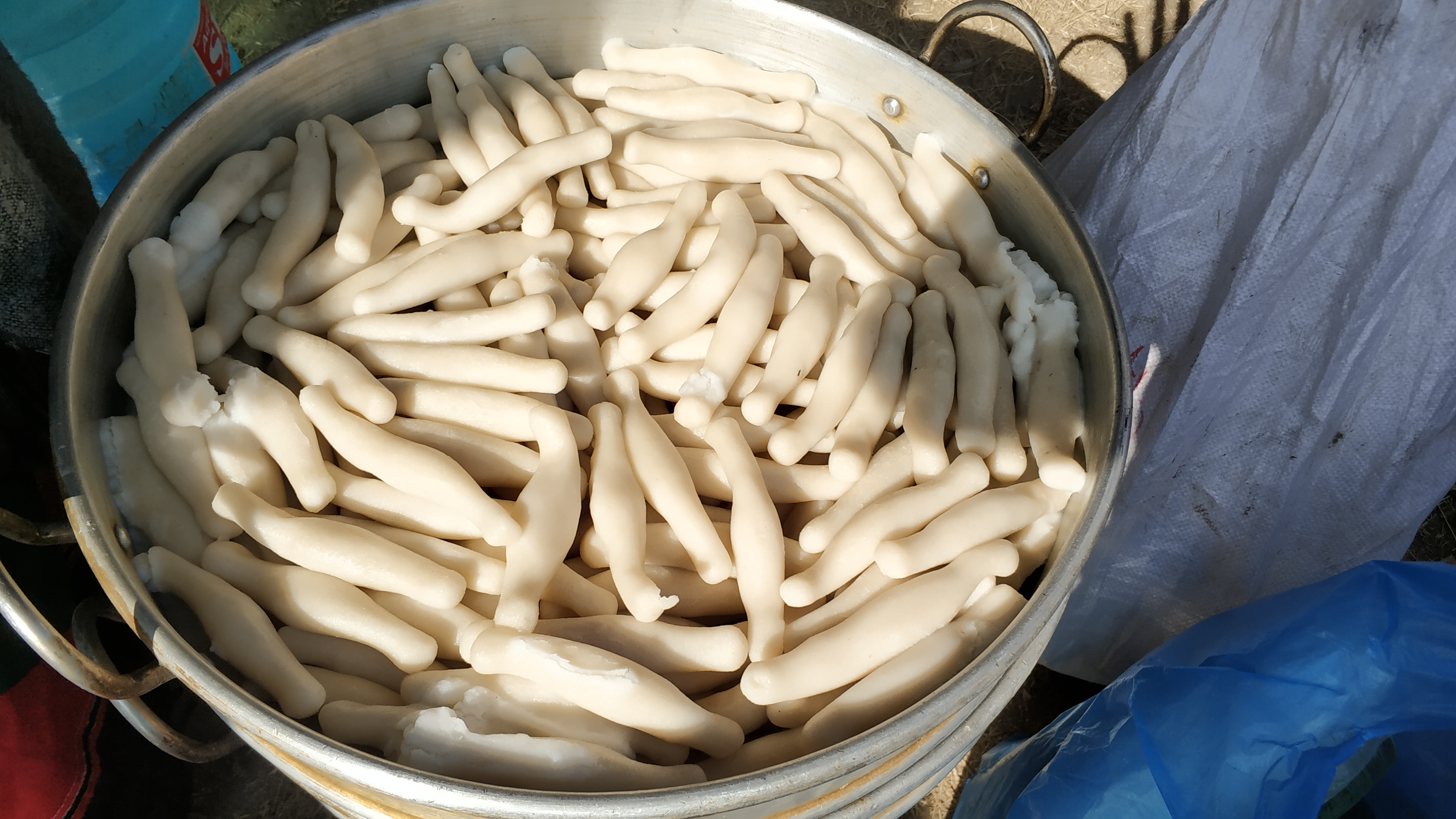
- Dhikri, a steam rice dish, popularly made in Tharu community
- Type: Cake
- Place of origin: Terai region of south western Nepal
- Associated cuisine: Nepalese cuisine
- Created by: Tharu people

Dhikri (Nepali: ढिक्री) is a Nepalese steamed rice cake primarily prepared by the Tharu people of southern Nepal. It is an essential food for the Maghi festival. It is also served in other festivals such as Dashain and Chhath.

It is prepared by making a dough with warm water and rice flour. The dough is given a shape of sausage. It is then steamed by placing a cotton cloth over it. It is served with spicy pickles, lentil soup or curry.

== See also ==
- Bagiya
- Nepalese cuisine
- List of Nepalese dishes
- Denhari, storage box made by Tharu people of Nepal
