= Yomari Punhi =

Newari festival marking the end of the rice harvest

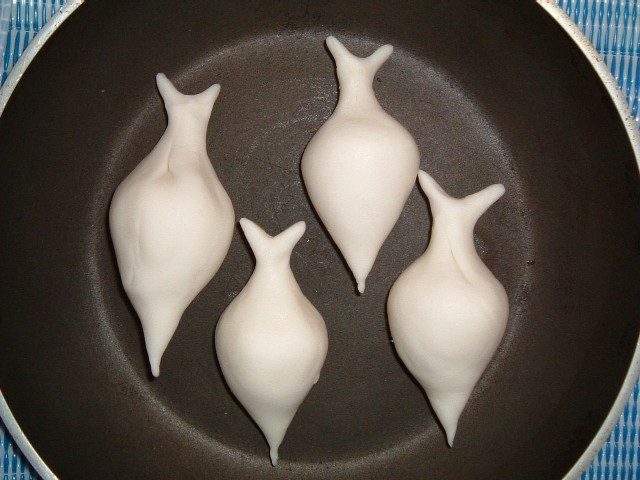
- Yomari confection
- Official name: Yomari Punhi, English translation: Full Moon of Tasty Bread
- Observed by: Newar people
- Type: Newari
- Celebrations: Worshiping Annapurna, eating Yomari
- Begins: Marga Sukla Purnima
- Ends: 4 days later
- Date: Thinla

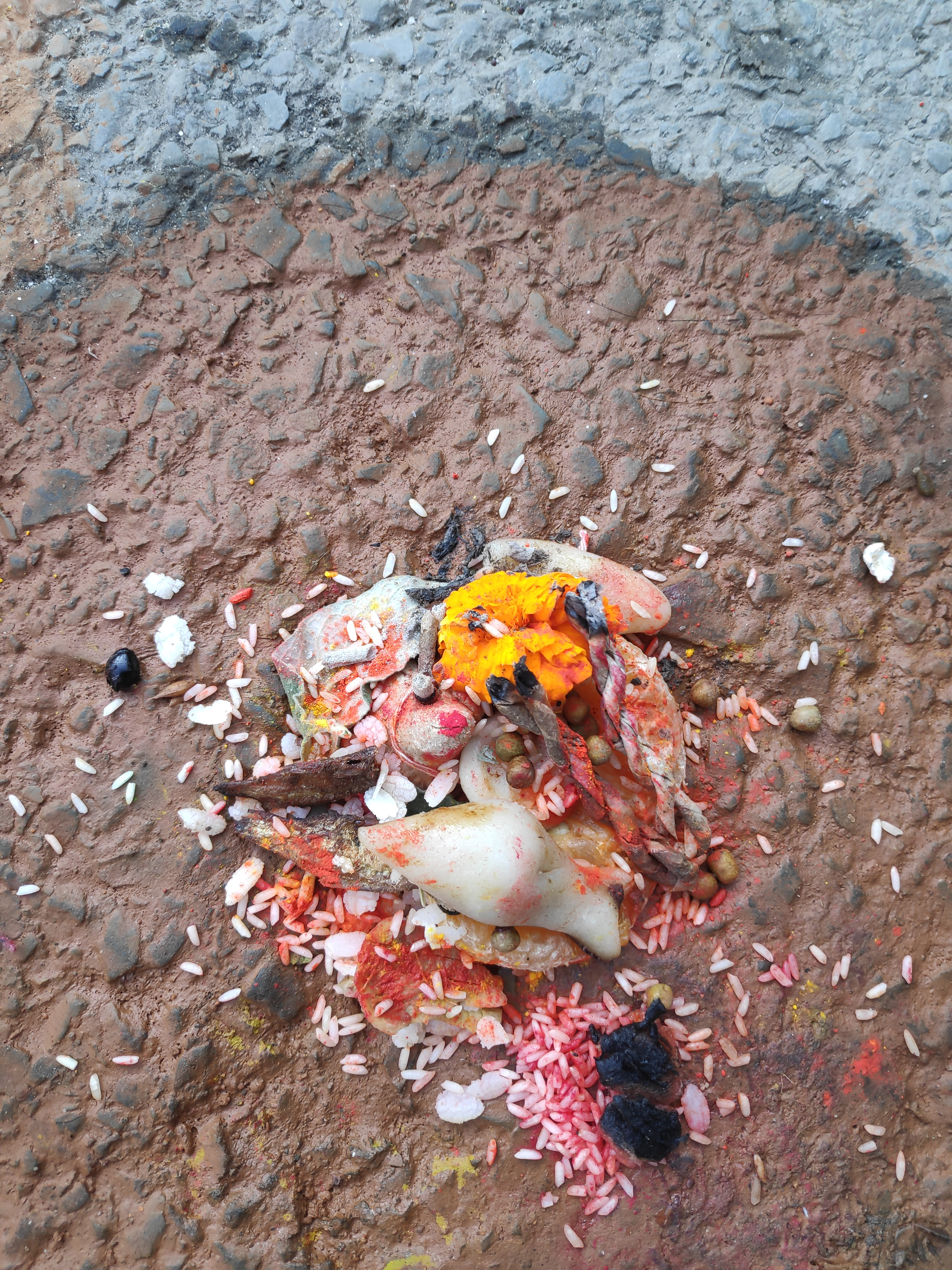
Yomari Punhi offering.

Yomari Punhi is a Nepalese festival celebrated by Newar community annually, marking the end of the rice harvest. It takes place in November/December during the full moon day of Thinlā (थिंला), the second month in the lunar Nepal Era calendar.

== Festival ==
Yomari Punhi, meaning the full moon of yomari, is one of the most popular Newar festivals and is observed every year during the full moon of December. A yomari is a confection of rice flour (from the new harvest) dough shaped like fish and filled with brown cane sugar and sesame seeds, which is then steamed. This delicacy is the chief item on the menu during the post-harvest celebration of Yomari Punhi.

On this full moon day, people of the Kathmandu Valley offer worship to Annapurna, the goddess of grains, for the rice harvest. Groups of kids go around neighborhood to ask yomari, a newari dish, from housewives in the evening. Sacred masked dances are performed in the villages of Hari Siddhi and Thecho at the southern end of the Valley to mark the festival. In a yomari people keep chaku a chocolate-like food or khuwa a ricotta-cheese-like dairy product. This is also one of the main festival celebrated only in newar community.

== Matinaa Paaru ==
On the day after Yomari Punhi, a day similar to Valentine's Day is observed. According to Basu Pasa's historical book Kantipur, among different shapes yomari, 'Bayo' symbolizes the male sexual organ whereas the triangle shaped with two points at the end known as 'Mayo' yomari suggests the female sexual organ and represents father and mother respectively. The Bayo yomari is filled with molasses and sesame seeds while the Mayo yomari is filled with pulses. So, Yomari is considered to be symbolic combination of sex. The culture of ‘Yomari Fonegu’ relates with love and romance. People went from house to house, toles to toles to ask Yomari, and at that time they got a chance to sneak peek and talk with their loved ones. In traditional days, society was restrictive with love. Yomari Punhi's ‘Yomari Fonegu’ culture was utilized as a cruising day in those times, and lovers would secretly meet the other day. There were no mobiles, no phones. People would write in particular expressions: ‘द्यः निभाः ह्याउँ ह्याउँ धाइ बलय् बुइँचा हिति फल्चा क्वसं पंबुझाः ल्यूने’ (as the sun starts to get red, down from Buincha hiti falcha, behind the bamboo trees)

Some people also relate Matinaa Paaru with story of Majipaa Lakhey. Majipa Lakhey's love story is another mythical love story, where a Lakhey (demon) turns into a caretaker after falling in love with a girl from Kathmandu.
