= Arti Rana =

Indian social entrepreneur

- Born: c. 1976 (age approx. 49)
- Occupation: Social entrepreneur
- Known for: Women self-help groups

Arti Rana (born c. 1976) is an Indian social entrepreneur. She helps fellow Tharu women to set up groups to make and sell handicrafts. In 2022, she received the Nari Shakti Puraskar, the highest civilian award for women in India.

== Career ==
Arti Rana was born around 1976. She is Tharu and lives in the Terai, near the Dudhwa Tiger Reserve and the border with Nepal. Under the National Rural Livelihood Mission, she set up Gautam self-employment to make items such as carpets, baskets and bags. The group worked with materials like moonj grass and jute.

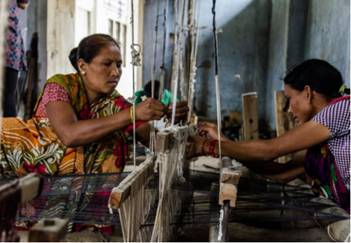
Tharu Hath KargaGharelu Udyog handicraft workers in Gabroula

By 2016, Rana had trained around 800 Tharu women. The business expanded, and by 2022 she was employing hundreds of women to make handicrafts. Rana was the president of the self-help group Tharu Hath KargaGharelu Udyog, which received assistance from the World Wide Fund for Nature to make its looms more efficient. In 2019, it was announced that a visitors centre would be built at the Dudhwa Tiger Reserve to inform tourists about Tharu heritage and sell local products; Rana was one of the co-ordinators for the project.

== Awards and recognition ==
Rana's entrepreneurship was recognized with a Rani Laxmibai Bravery award in 2016 and a Gram Swaraj award.

On International Women's Day in 2022, Rana received the Nari Shakti Puraskar, the highest award for women in India, for the year 2020 in recognition of her social entrepreneurship. The ceremony had been postponed due to the COVID-19 pandemic in India.
