= Sakhiya dance =

Cultural dance of Tharu people of Nepal

Sakhiya Nach
- Native name: सखिया नाच
- Genre: Cultural dance
- Instrument(s): Madal and Majaira
- Inventor: Tharu people

Sakhiya dance is a Nepalese traditional dance performed by the Tharu community during the Dashain and Tihar festivals. Officially, it begins on the day of Krishna Janmashtami. The dance is mainly performed by the unmarried young girls and boys. In the first phase, boys play drums and girls use pumpkin leaves. In the second phase, girls use jute fabric and in the final phase, girls have to use cymbals which is known as Majaira in Tharu language. Boys wear Dhoti and Jhuluwa while girls wear Choliya and Fariya and various ornaments and jewelry.

The dance is led by the village headsman and generally performed in his house's courtyard. The boys' group selects a leader called Aguwa Mandariya and an assistant called Pachhuwa Mandariy. Similarly, the girls' group selects a leader called Guru Mohriyiniya and two assistants called Pachhgihniya. On the day of the dance, the participants are summoned to avoid evil spirit and the dance is performed in the courtyard of the village headsman's house.
