= Tharu people =

Ethnic group in Nepal and India

Thāru
थारू
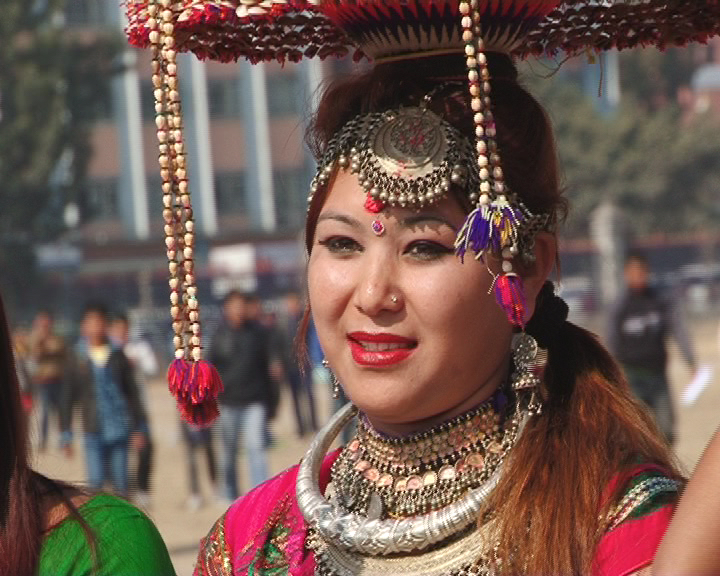
- A Tharu woman in traditional dress

Total population
- c. 1.96 million

Regions with significant populations
- Nepal: 1,807,124
- Lumbini: 732,069
- Sudurpaschim: 397,822
- Madhesh: 301,038
- Koshi: 209,519
- Bagmati: 110,284
- Gandaki: 47,619
- Karnali: 8,773
- India: 356,572
- Bihar: 159,939
- Uttar Pradesh: 105,291
- Uttarakhand: 91,342

Languages
- Tharu languages, Nepali, Hindi

Religion
- Hinduism 96.5%, Christianity 1.9%, Buddhism 1.2%, Prakriti 0.2%, Baháʼí 0.02%

Related ethnic groups
- Dhimal; Bhoksa; Lampucchwa Tharu; Rana Tharu; Ban Rawats; other Indo-Aryan peoples

A Tharu traditional healer describing local medicinal plants in Saptariya Tharu language

The Tharu people (pronounced [tʰaru]) are an ethnic group living in the Terai in southern Nepal and northern India. They speak Tharu languages. They are recognized as an official ethnicity by the Government of Nepal. In the Indian Terai, they live foremost in Uttarakhand, Uttar Pradesh and Bihar. The Government of India recognizes the Tharu people as a scheduled Indian tribe.

== Etymology ==
The word थारू (thāru) is thought to be derived from sthavir meaning follower of Theravada Buddhism. The Tharu people in the central Nepali Terai see themselves as the original people of the land and descendants of Gautama Buddha. Rana Tharu people of western Nepal connect the name to the Thar Desert and understand themselves as descendants of Rajputs who migrated to the forests in the 16th century. Possible is also that the name is derived from the classical Tibetan words mtha'-ru'i brgyud, meaning the 'country at the border', which the Tibetan scholar Taranatha used in the 16th century in his book on the history of Buddhism.

== Distribution ==
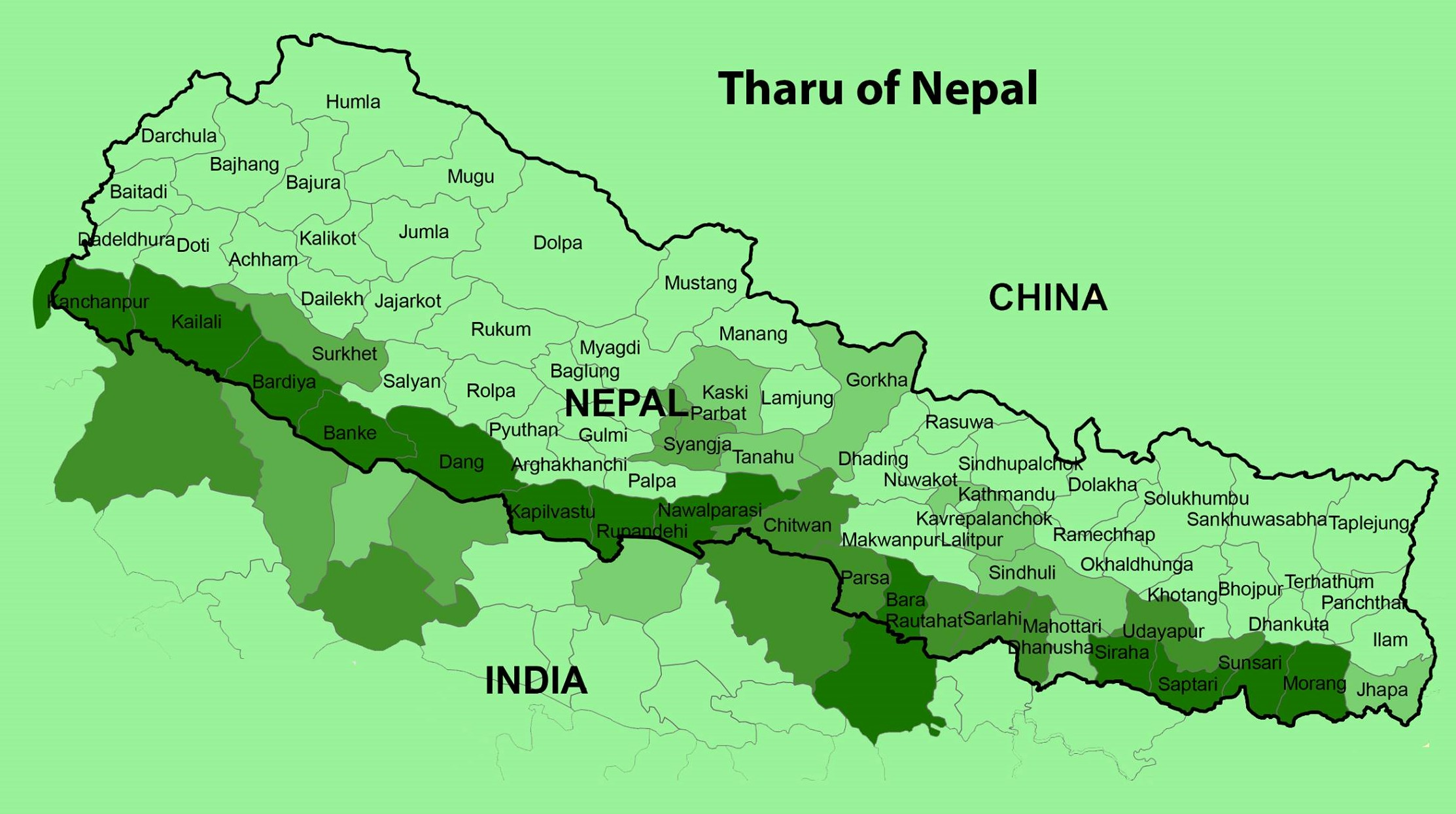
Map showing area inhabited by Tharu people in dark green

In 2009, the majority of Tharu people were estimated to live in Nepal. There are several endogamous subgroups of Tharu that are scattered over most of the Terai:

- Rana Tharu people in the Kailali and Kanchanpur Districts of the far western Nepali Terai; also in India, in Udham Singh Nagar district, Uttarakhand and Kheri district of Uttar Pradesh. As of 2020, Rana Tharus are no longer considered a subgroup of Tharu people but a separate ethnicity of their own by the Government of Nepal.
- Kathariya Tharu mostly in Kailali District and in Lakhimpur Kheri, Pilibhit, Bahraich districts of India;
- Sonha Tharu in Bardia, Kailali and Kanchanpur;
- Dangaura Tharu in the western Terai: Dang-Deukhuri, Banke, Bardia, Kailali, Kanchanpur, Surkhet, Rupandehi and Kapilvastu Districts;
- Chitwan Tharu in central Terai: Makwanpur, Chitwan and Nawalparasi Districts;
- Kochila Tharu in eastern Terai: Morang, Sunsari, Saptari, Bara, Parsa, Rautahat, Sarlahi, Mahottari and Udayapur districts;
- Danuwar in eastern Terai: Sindhuli, Udayapur, Saptari and Morang Districts;
- Lampucchwa Tharu in Morang and Sunsari District.

Smaller numbers of Tharu people reside in the adjacent Indian districts Champaran in Bihar, Gorakhpur, Basti and Gonda districts in Uttar Pradesh, and Khatima in Uttarakhand.

As of 2011, the Tharu population in Nepal was censused at 1,737,470 people, or 6.6% of the total population. The percentage of Tharu people by province was as follows:

- Sudurpashchim Province (17.3%)
- Lumbini Province (15.3%)
- Madhesh Province (5.3%)
- Koshi Province (4.1%)
- Gandaki Province (1.7%)
- Bagmati Province (1.6%)
- Karnali Province (0.4%)

The percentage of Tharu people was higher than national average (6.6%) in the following districts:

- Bardiya District (53.3%)
- Kailali District (41.9%)
- Dang District (29.7%)
- Kanchanpur District (25.8%)
- Parasi (18.4%)
- Banke District (15.8%)
- Kapilvastu District (12.3%)
- Sunsari District (12.1%)
- Nawalpur District (11.8%)
- Saptari District (11.5%)
- Chitwan District (11.0%)
- Bara District (10.5%)
- Rupandehi District (9.7%)
- Parsa District (7.6%)
- Udayapur District (7.6%)

== History ==
According to Alberuni, Tharu people have been living in the eastern Terai since at least the 10th century. The Rana Tharus in western Nepal claim to be of Rajput origin and to have migrated from the Thar Desert in Rajasthan to Nepal's Far Western Terai region after the defeat of Maharana Pratap against a Mughal emperor in the 16th century. Some scholars refute this claim. Another claim posits that the Tharu people are descendants of the Shakya dynasty, who propagated Mahayana Buddhism in Nepal from the late 1st century BC to the early 1st century AD.

=== 13th to 20th centuries ===
The Tabaqat-i Nasiri chronicle of the Islamic world contains records of an expedition by Muhammad bin Bakhtiyar Khalji into Kamrup region between Gauda and Tibet in 1205 AD and refers to the resident people as Kunch, today's Koch people, Mej/Meg today's Mech people and Tiharu as having similar appearances. These people impressed the Turkic peoples who had similar features as them, like slanting eyes, snub noses, high cheek bones, yellow complexion of the Mongols and who spoke a different language than in the rest of the subcontinent.

Following the unification of Nepal in the late 18th century, members of the ruling families received land grants in the Terai and were entitled to collect revenue from those who cultivated the land. The Tharu people became bonded labourers in a system also known as Kamaiya. In 1854, Jung Bahadur Rana enforced the so-called Muluki Ain, a General Code, in which both Hindu and non-Hindu castes were classified based on their habits of food and drink. Tharu people were categorized as "Paani Chalne Masinya Matwali", i.e., touchable enslavable alcohol drinking group, together with several other ethnic minorities. In the late 1950s, the World Health Organization supported the Nepalese government in eradicating malaria in the forests of the central Terai. Following the malaria eradication program using DDT in the 1960s, a large and heterogeneous non-Tharu population from the Nepali hills, Bhutan, Sikkim and India settled in the region. In the western Terai, many Tharu families lost the land, which they used to cultivate, to these immigrants and were forced to work as Kamaiya. In Chitwan, after the eradication of malaria, the U.S. government joined forces with the Nepali government in a project to build a new road, schools and health clinics, and distribute land to migrants from the hills. They invited Tharu people to take land but many Tharus preferred staying "voluntarily landless", as they worried that taking land would make them vulnerable to exploitation from Nepali governmental tax collectors and to attacks from wild animals. They preferred to stay as tenants for large Tharu landlords, who were often relatives.

When the first protected areas were established in Chitwan, Tharu communities were forced to relocate from their traditional lands. They were denied any right to own land and thus forced into a situation of landlessness and poverty. When the Chitwan National Park was designated, Nepalese soldiers destroyed the villages located inside the national park, burned down houses, and beat the people who tried to plough their fields. Some threatened Tharu people at gun point to leave.

=== 1990 to present ===
After the overthrow of the Panchayat system in Nepal in 1990, the Tharu ethnic association Tharu Kalyankari Sabha joined the umbrella organisation of ethnic groups, a predecessor of the Nepal Federation of Indigenous Nationalities.

In July 2000, the Government of Nepal abolished the practice of bonded labour prevalent under the Kamaiya system and declared loan papers illegal. Kamaiya families were thus enfranchised from debts supposedly incurred, but were also rendered homeless and jobless. Bonded labour shifted to children who work in other households for food for themselves and their families, but rarely with access to school education.

During the Nepalese Civil War, Tharu people experienced an intense period of violence, were recruited by and coerced to help the Maoists, especially in western Nepal; several Tharu leaders were assassinated and infrastructure of the Tharu organisation Backward Society Education destroyed. After the Comprehensive Peace Accord was signed in 2006, Tharu organisations postulated an autonomous Tharu state within a federal Nepal, emphasising equality of opportunity and equal distribution of land and resources. In 2009, Tharu people across the Nepal Terai protested against the government's attempt to categorise them as Madheshi people.

Bhuti Devi from Hasanpur Village in Sunsari District shares her experiences inking tattoos

== Genetics ==
Genetic studies on Y-DNA of Tharu people from two villages in Chitwan district and one in Morang district revealed a high presence of Haplogroup O-M117 (33.3%) followed by Haplogroup H (25.7%), Haplogroup J2a-M410(xM68, M47, M67, M158) (9.9%), Haplogroup R1a (8.8%), Haplogroup R2a-M124 (4.7%), Haplogroup J2b2-M12/M102/M241(xM99) (4.1%), Haplogroup D-M174 (3.5%), Haplogroup L-M20 (2.3%), Haplogroup O-M95 (2.3%), Haplogroup E-M35 (1.8%), Haplogroup O-M134(xM117) (1.2%), Haplogroup Q-M242 (1.2%), Haplogroup C1b1a1-M356 (0.6%), and Haplogroup K-M9(xM70, M20, M214, M74) (0.6%). A genetic study on mtDNA of several Tharus in Nepal showed that the total of South Asian mtDNA haplogroups ranges from 31.6% to 67.5% in the Tharu while the total of East Asian mtDNA haplogroups ranges from 32.5% to 68.4% depending on the Tharu group studied. A genetic survey of Tharus from Nepal, Uttarakhand and Uttar Pradesh showed that they have both a South Asian and an East Asian human genetic origin.

=== Resistance to malaria ===
The Tharu are famous for their ability to survive in the malarial parts of the Terai that were deadly to outsiders. Contemporary medical research comparing Tharu with other ethnic groups living nearby found an incidence of malaria nearly seven times lower among Tharu. The researchers believed such a large difference pointed to genetic factors rather than behavioural or dietary differences. This was confirmed by follow-up investigation finding genes for thalassemia in nearly all Tharu studied. Tharu people have limited, not complete, immunity to malaria. Many Tharus, particularly babies, died from malaria.

== Culture ==
Wax statues of Tharu people in Tharu Museum, Chitwan District

The Tharu people comprise several groups who speak different dialects and differ in traditional dress, customs, rituals and social organization. They consider themselves as a people of the forest. In Chitwan, they have lived in the forests for hundreds of years practising a short fallow shifting cultivation. They plant rice, wheat, mustard, maize and lentils, but also collect forest products such as wild fruits, vegetables, medicinal plants and materials to build their houses; hunt deer, rabbit and wild boar, and go fishing in the rivers and oxbow lakes.

The Rana Tharus never went abroad for employment, a life that kept them isolated in their own localities. They developed a unique culture free from the influence of adjacent India, or from the ethnic groups in Nepal's mountains. The most striking aspects of their environment are the decorated rice containers, colorfully painted verandahs and outer walls of their homes using only available materials like clay, mud, cow dung and grass. Much of the rich design is rooted in devotional activities and passed on from one generation to the next, occasionally introducing contemporary elements such as a bus or an airplane.

An Eastern Tharu riddle

=== Language ===
Tharu communities in different parts of Nepal and India do not share the same language. Several speak various endemic Tharu languages. In western Nepal and adjacent parts of India, Tharus speak variants of Hindi, Urdu and Awadhi. In and near central Nepal, they speak a variant of Bhojpuri. In eastern Nepal, they speak a variant of Maithili. More standard versions of these dialects are widely spoken by non-Tharu neighbors in the same areas so that there are no important linguistic barriers between Tharus and their neighbors. However, there are linguistic barriers between these dialects standing in the way of communication between Tharus from different regions.

=== Art ===
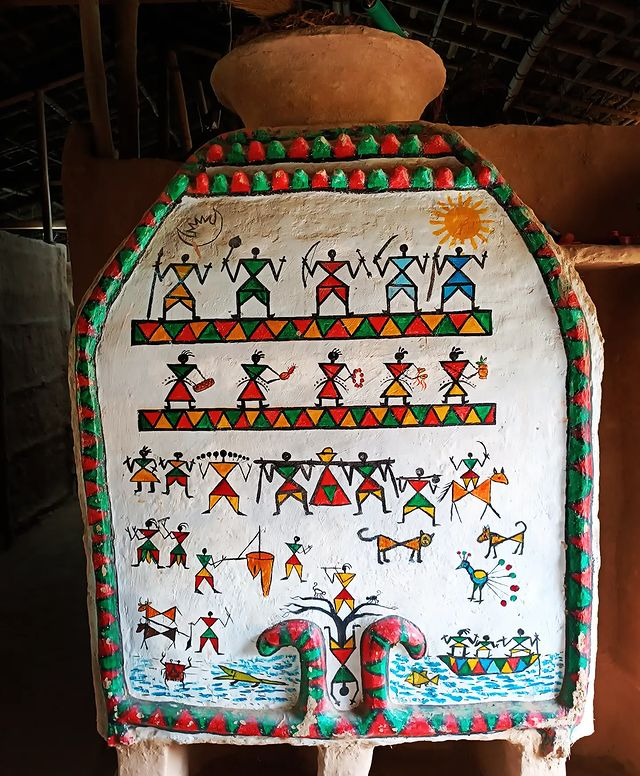
Ashtimki painting of Western Tharus on a Dehari

Ashtimki painting is a type of painting drawn on the day of Ashtimki festival celebrated by the Tharus in the western region of Nepal using home-made colors made from red clay (red), bean leaves (green) and burnt wild grass (black). The painting depicts the story of evolution. The main components of the painting are Krishna, a Neolamarckia cadamba tree, a boat, fish, crabs, tortoise, monkeys and other animals, the ten-headed demon Ravana, Pandava, Draupadi, a sun and a moon.

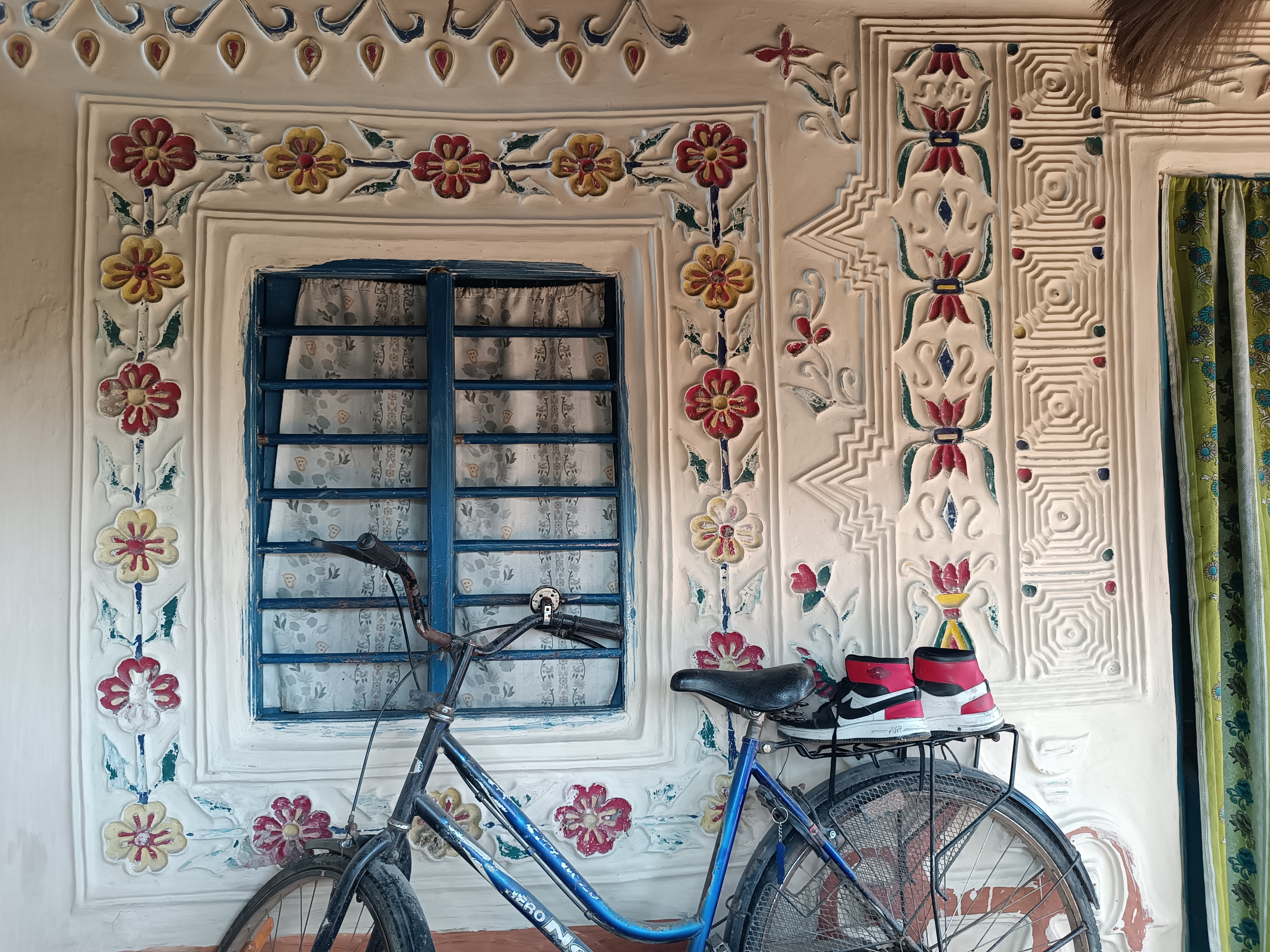
Mokha art of Eastern Tharus

Mokha art is a typical style of painting the outer walls and verandas of homes in colourful forms in eastern Nepal. The artists, mostly women, make a mixture of clay and jute or mixture of clay, rice bran and cow dung, depending upon the district, and layers of the mixture are applied to the walls depicting floral and geometric patterns including birds and animals among many other motifs. When the design dries, they apply a layer of white clay to it and use natural colours to give them a facelift.

Denhari is a traditional earthen vessel used to store food grains. It is made by using loamy clay, paddy straw and rice husk and has a round, rectangular or conical shapes. It is mostly made by females and mostly used to store paddy, wheat, rice, maize, lentils and mustard seeds. The vessel is also an integral part of religious festival and cultural activities.

Sikki grass crafts are various handicrafts made from a special kind of grass known as sikki or moonj grass. Sikki baskets known as Dhakiya, Mauni or Daliya depending upon the place are baskets made from sikki or moonj grass plays an important role in everyday household activities of the Tharu community. They are also used in every rituals of Tharu community from the birth to death.

=== Religion ===
The spiritual beliefs and moral values of the Tharu people are closely linked to the natural environment. The pantheon of their gods comprises a large number of deities that live in the forest. They are asked for support before entering the forest. Tharus have been influenced by Hinduism for several centuries. However, since the 1990s, some Tharu groups in the Nepal Terai converted to Buddhism in the wake of ethnic movements for social inclusion and against the religious hierarchy imposed by the Hindu State. In recent years a smaller number of Tharu people have converted to Christianity particularly after the rise of democracy in 1990.

=== Marriage system ===
An Eastern Tharu song sung during marriage ceremony.

Traditionally, Rana Tharus practice arranged marriages, which parents often arrange already during the couple's childhood. The wedding ceremony is held when the bride and groom reach marriable age. The ceremony lasts several days, involving all the relatives of the two families. Among the Rana Tharus in Bardiya District, it is also custom to arrange marriage of a daughter in exchange for getting a bride for a son or vice versa. Parents give particular attention to the working capacity of the groom and bride, rather than the economic situation of the in-law family. Polygamous marriages are also customary among Tharu people, with rich land holders marrying between two and five women.

=== Household structure ===
In the western Terai, Rana Tharu traditionally live in Badaghar called longhouses with big families of up to 31 members from four generations and between one and eight married couples. The household members pool their labour force, contribute their income, share the expenditure and use one kitchen. The eldest male person in charge of Badaghar households and associated land holdings is called Mukhiya. He assigns tasks to family members, is responsible for the family's social activities and has to report income and expenditures annually to the family. When families were forced to resettle, some of these Badaghar households broke up into smaller units of up to six households.

=== Social structure ===
Tharu people in Rajapur, Nepal are either landholders, cultivate land on a sharecropping basis or are landless agricultural labourers.

=== Festivals ===
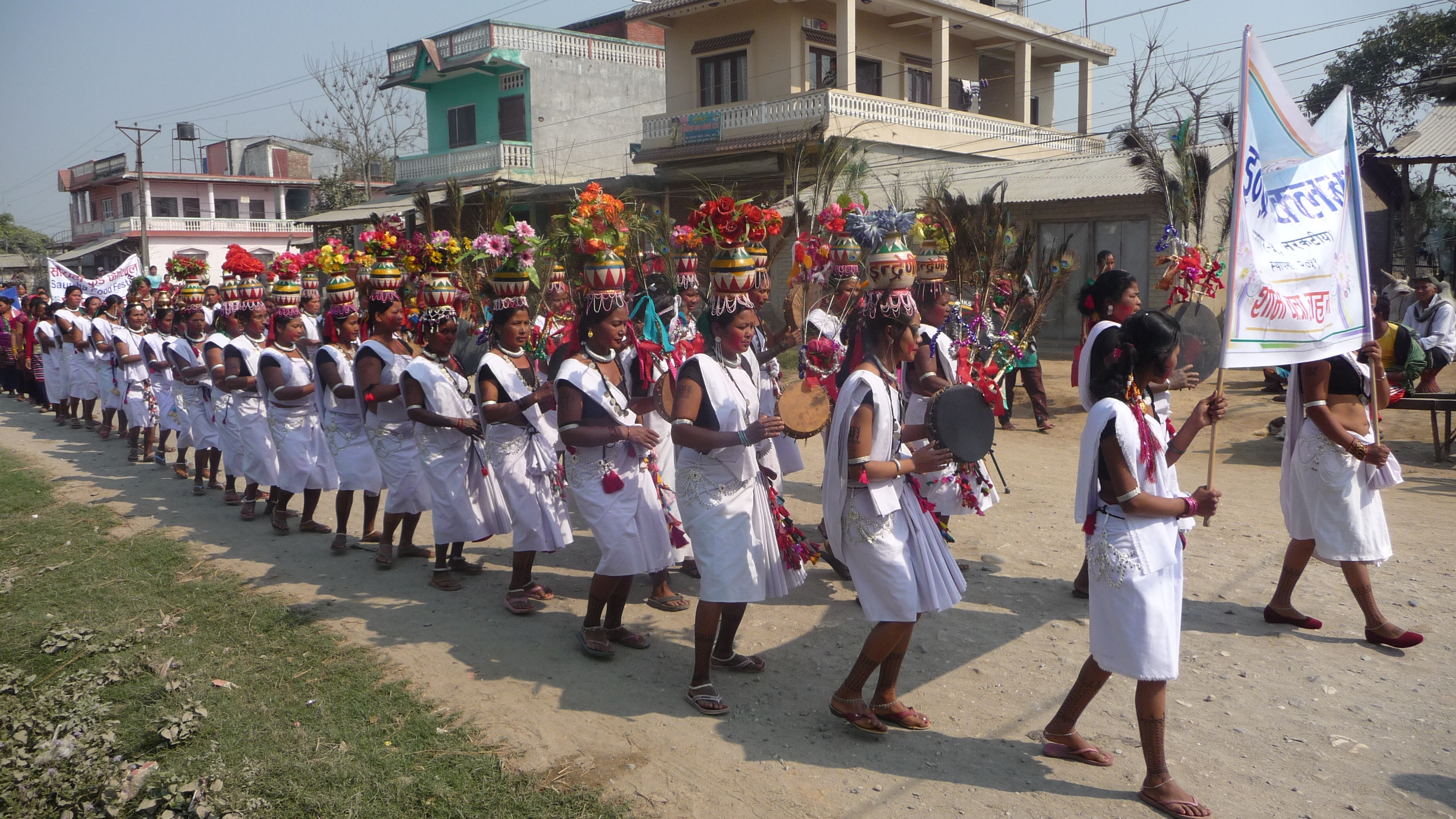
Tharu food festival, Sauraha, Nepal

A song of blessing sung during Sama Chakeva festival.

Tharu people celebrate Maghe Sankranti on the first day of the Nepali month of Magh, usually around the middle of January. Depending on the location they call this day Magh, Maghi, Tila Sankranti, Kichhra and Khichdi. In the western region of Nepal, they celebrate Ashtimki on the day of Krishna Janmashtami. On this day, people of Tharu communities draw a special artwork known as Ashtimki Chitra made on the wall of the living room of the house of the village elder. The art in painting is thought to be related to the creation of the universe. In the eastern Terai, Tharu people celebrate Jur Sital on the first day of the year in the month of Vaisakha by sprinkling water on each other. The elders put water on the forehead and head of the young ones with blessing, while the young people put water on the feet of the elders to pay respect. Compatriots sprinkle water on each other's body. Tharu women of central and eastern Nepal celebrate Jitiya, which is one of the most important Tharu festivals. They fast or keep “vrata” for the welfare of their children. Eastern Tharus celebrate Sama Chakeva in the month of Kartik to honour the relationship between brothers and sisters. The sisters make clay statuettes of Shama, Chakeva, Sathbhainya, Chugala, cymbalist, drummer, dancer, Brindavan, a wild fowl, a bumblebee and a dog among others.

=== Folk dance ===
Sakhiya dance is a traditional Tharu dance performed during the Dashain and Tihar festivals by the unmarried young girls and boys. Lathi Nach, also known as Tharu stick dance, is mainly performed during the Dashain festival.

=== Cuisine ===
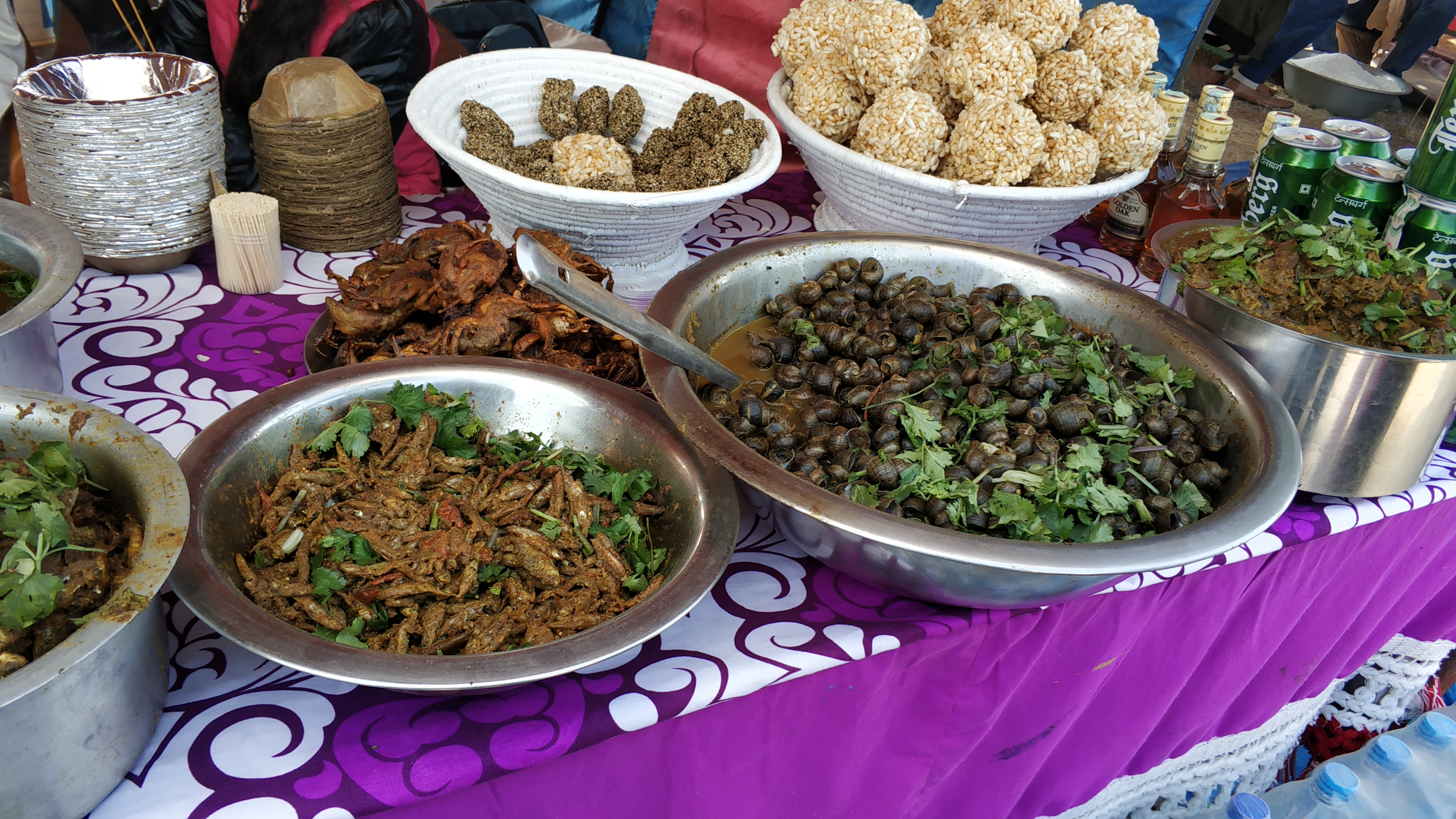
Tharu food during Maghe Sankranti festival

Tharus have a diverse food culture. Their cuisine varies depending on the region they inhabit. Ghonghi is a fresh water snail dish eaten by sucking the snail from its shell. It is served with rice and this combination, for indigenous people in Terai, had been a staple food for ages. Dhikri is a popular western Tharu dish which is prepared by making a dough with warm water and rice flour and is eaten with spicy chutney. Bagiya is similar to dhikri but is popular among eastern Tharus and consists of an external covering of rice flour and an inner content of sweet substances such like chaku, vegetables and other fried items.

== Notable Tharu people ==
- Barsha Lekhi - Miss Nepal 2016
- Bijay Kumar Gachhadar - politician and Former Deputy Prime Minister of Nepal
- Dilli Bahadur Chaudhary - politician and chief minister of Lumbini Province
- Aman Lal Modi - Nepalese Minister of Federal Affairs
- Umakant Chaudhary - politician and the former minister for Water Supply of Nepal
- Gopal Dahit - Nepalese politician
- Resham Lal Chaudhary - Nepalese politician
- Sarswati Chaudhary - Nepalese track and field athlete
- Tilak Ram Tharu - Nepalese track and field athlete
- Ganga Chaudhary Satgauwa - politician
- Mamta Chaudhary - cricketer
- Teju Lal Chaudhary - politician
- Dipendra Chaudhary - cricketer
- Aditya Chaudhary - Nepali footballer
- Shanta Chaudhary - politician, Nepalese Women Writer
- Arun Kumar Chaudhary - politician
- Mangal Prasad Tharu - politician
- Shivani Singh Tharu - Nepalese former talk show host, model, and playwright
- Arti Rana - Indian social entrepreneur
