= Yomari =

Nepali sweet dumpling

Yo:mari
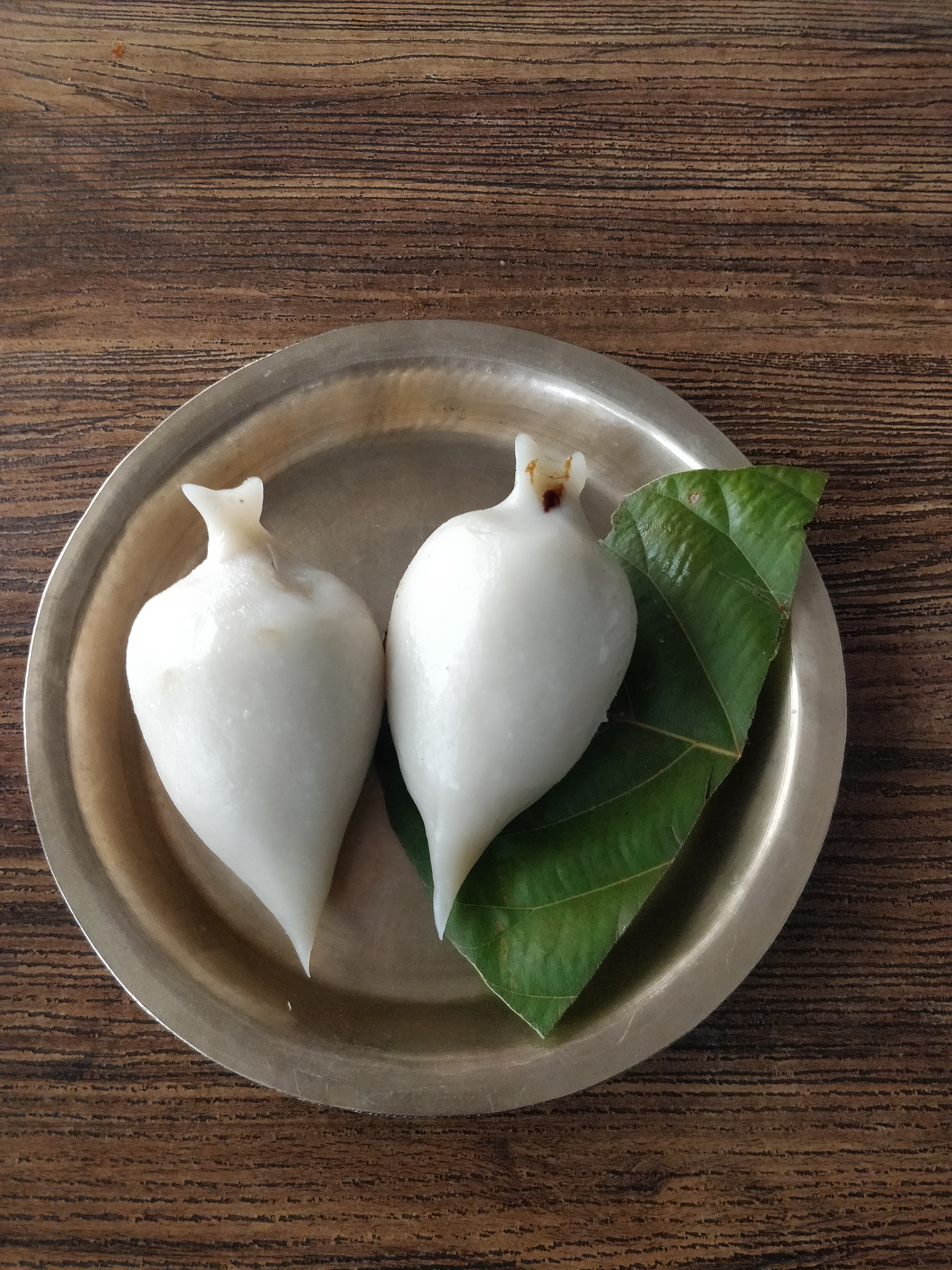
- Region or state: Kathmandu Valley, Nepal
- Associated cuisine: Newar Cuisine
- Main ingredients: Glutinous rice flour and stuffings (Chaku, Khuwa, minced meat or lentils)

Yo:mari, also called Ya:mari, (Nepal Bhasa: 𑐫𑑅𑐩𑐬𑐷 [jɔːməɾi] or 𑐫𑑀𑑅𑐩𑐵𑐬𑐷 [joːmaɾi] Bhaktapur Dialect ) is a delicacy of the Newar community in Nepal. Usually eaten in the winter, it is a steamed dumpling that consists of an external covering of glutinous rice flour, usually taichin rice, with sweet high caloric fillings such as chaku and khuwa which are traditionally believed to ward off the cold. It is also prepared with savoury fillings like minced meat (usually buff) and lentils. Yo:mari plays a very important role in Newar society and is a key part of its namesake festival, Yo:mari Punhi, celebrated in the winter.

== Etymology ==
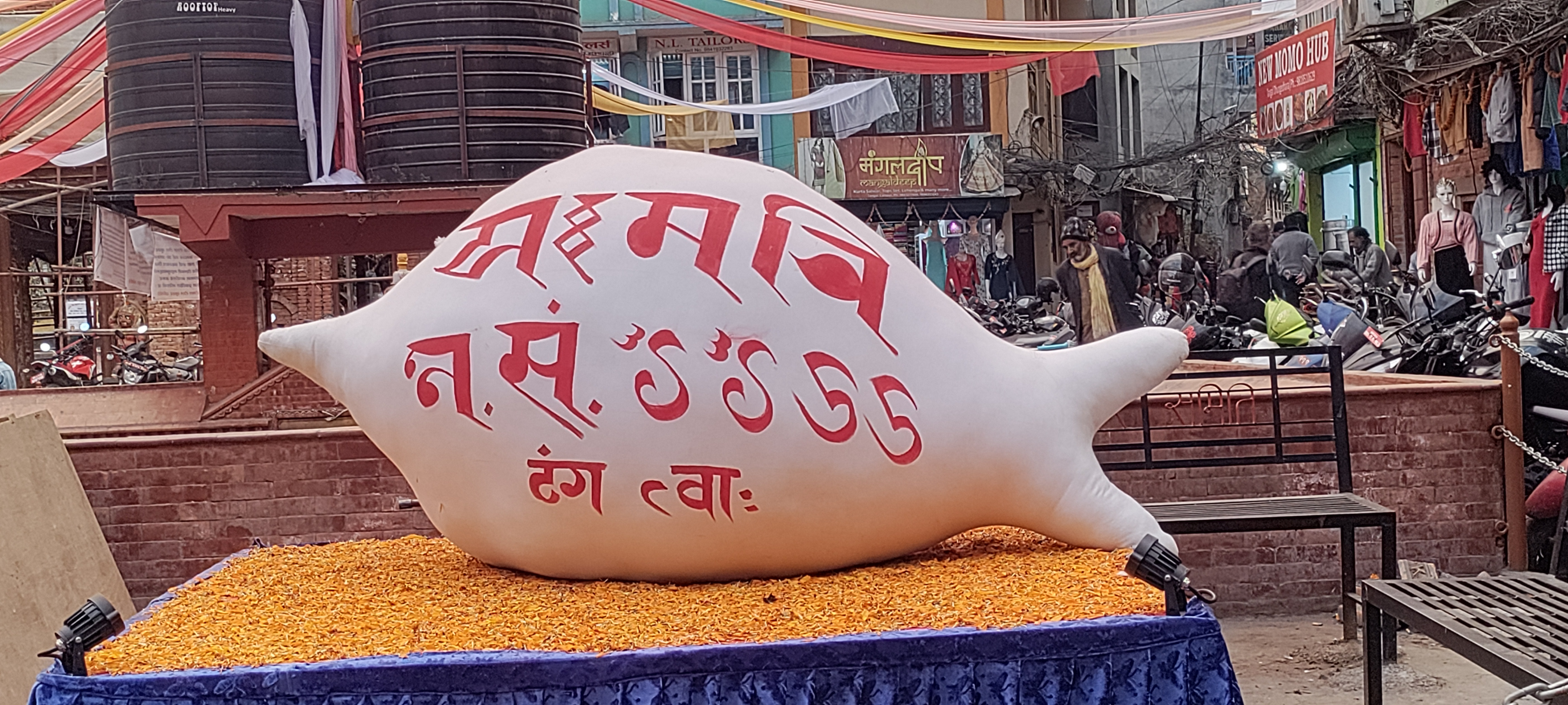
Yo:mari showing at Lagankhel, Lalitpur

The current name of the dish in modern Newar seems to be derived from the Classic Newar term. In historical documents from the Malla dynasty, particularly a stone inscription in Pashupati from 1440, the dish was referred as irhamadhe (Classical Newar: 𑐂𑐬𑑂𑐴𑐩𑐢𑐾; इर्हमधे); the name of the dish, towards the end of the 17th century, had evolved to elamādhe (Classical Newar: 𑐊𑐮𑐩𑐵𑐢𑐾; एलमाधे). The name further evolved to its present form, yo:mari. Here, Yo (𑐫) means 'to like' and Mari (𑐩𑐬𑐷) means 'bread' or 'dough' in Nepal Bhasa, implying that it is liked by everyone.

== Festival ==
The festival of Yo:mari Punhi (Nepal Bhasa: 𑐫𑑅𑐩𑐬𑐷 𑐥𑐸𑐣𑑂𑐴𑐶), literally meaning 'the full moon of yo:mari', is celebrated on the full moon in the month of Thinla (थिंला), the second month in the Newar Calendar. On this day, the people of Kathmandu Valley worship Annapurna, the goddess of grains, signifying the end of the rice harvest season.

Traditionally, Yo:mari Punhi is celebrated for 4 days. All family members sit together and make yo:mari. In the evening of the first day, children and teens go around their neighbourhood singing and dancing from door to door, and asking for Yo:mari, money or delicacies in return. This is called Yo:mari Phwanegu (Nepal Bhasa: 𑐫𑑅𑐩𑐬𑐷 𑐦𑑂𑐰𑐣𑐾𑐐𑐸), 'begging for yo:mari'. The children sing a folk song called Tya Chi: Tya:.

The day after the full moon is called Matina Paru (Nepal Bhasa: 𑐩𑐟𑐶𑐣𑐵 𑐥𑐵𑐬𑐸) which means 'the day of love', also nicknamed the Newari Valentine's Day. According to Basu Pasa's historical book Kantipur, among different shapes yomari, 'Bayo' symbolizes the male sexual organ whereas the triangle shaped with two points at the end known as 'Mayo' yo:mari suggests the female sexual organ and represents father and mother, respectively. The Bayo yo:mari is filled with molasses and sesame seeds while the Mayo yomari is filled with pulses. So, yo:mari is considered to be a symbolic combination of sex. The culture of Yo:mari Phwanegu also relates with love and romance. When people went toles to toles to ask yo:mari, they got a chance to sneak peek and talk with their loved ones. In traditional days, society was restrictive with love. Yo:mari Punhi's Yo:mari Phwanegu culture was utilized as a cruising day in those times, and lovers would secretly meet the other day. People would write in particular expressions: ‘द्यः निभाः ह्याउँ ह्याउँ धाइ बलय् बुइँचा हिति फल्चा क्वसं पंबुझाः ल्यूने’ (as the sun starts to get red, down from Buincha hiti phalcha, behind the bamboo trees).

The third day does not have any significant festival, but on the fourth day, a final feast is held in the evening. Different guthis, toles or families come together to have a festive meal or Bhwe (𑐨𑑂𑐰𑐾).

== Origin ==
Locals have different versions regarding the origin of the yo:mari. One legend has it that a married couple in Panchal (present day Panauti) first experimented with fresh yield of rice from their field. And what took shape turned out came to be known as yo:mari. The new delicacy was eventually distributed among the neighbours. As the food was liked by all, yo:mari, which literally means 'bread that is liked'.

The myth further states that on the same day the couple offered the new delicacy to Kuber, the god of wealth, who was passing by in a disguise. Following this, Kuber disclosed his real identity and blessed the couple with wealth. He also declared that whoever will prepare yo:mari in the form of gods and goddesses on the full moon of Thinla and observe four days of devotion to god, will get rid of poverty.

On the contrary, according to the book ‘Social History of Nepal’ by Tulasi Ram Vaidya, Tri Ratna Manandhar and Shankar Lal Joshi, the Bhasa Vamsavali found in Kathmandu Valley mentions that the people of Kathmandu started making yo:maris from the time of King Amshuverma, from 6th CE.

== Traditions ==
On the occasion of second, fourth, sixth, eighth, tenth and twelfth birthdays, children are adorned with garland of yo:mari corresponding to their age.

Similarly, yo:mari is prepared along with samay baji (𑐳𑐩𑐫𑑂𑐧𑐖𑐶) during festivals, anniversaries and puja.

== Gallery ==
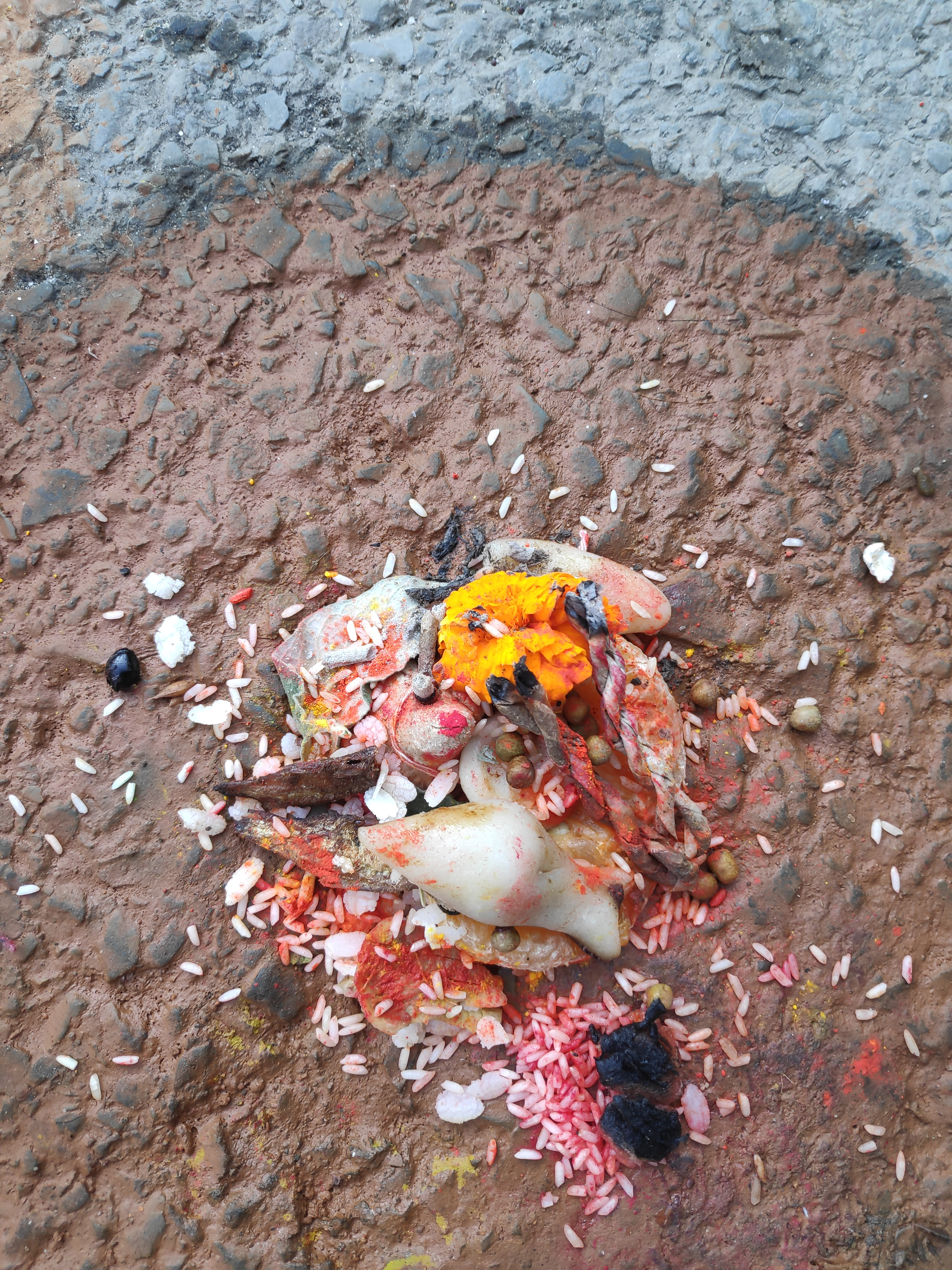
Yomari Punhi offering.

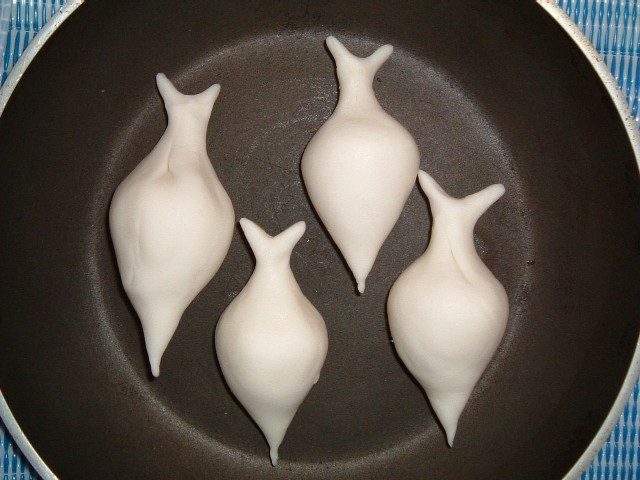
Yomari

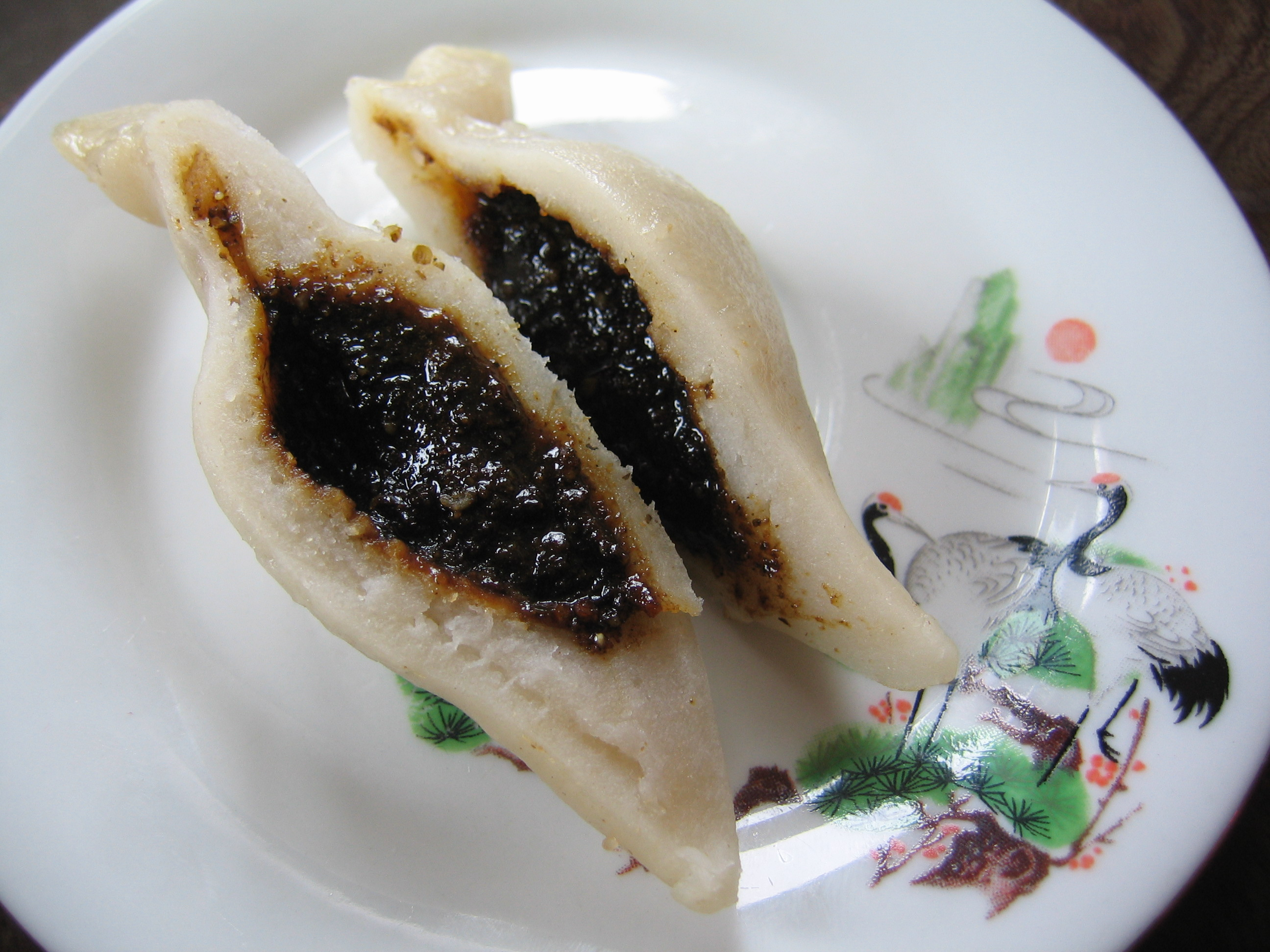
The filling inside Yomari

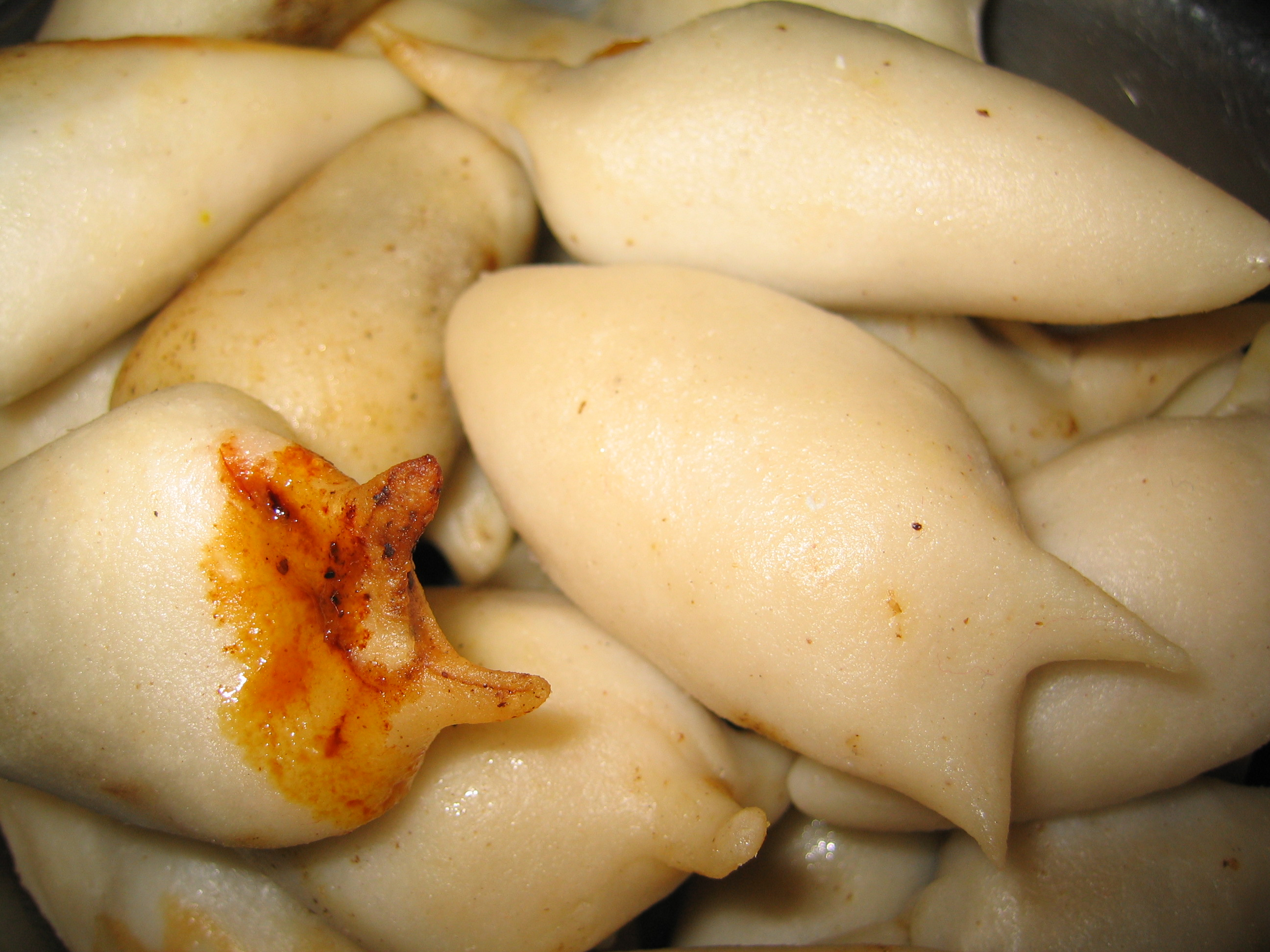
A close-up view of Yomari

Yamari of Nepal

== See also ==
- Newar cuisine
- List of Nepalese dishes
- Dumplings
