= Paubha =

Traditional religious painting made by the Newar people of Nepal

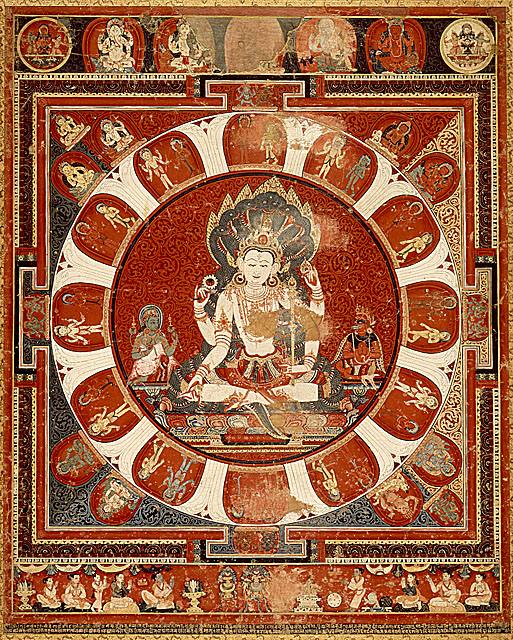
Paubha painting showing Vishnu Mandala (15th century).

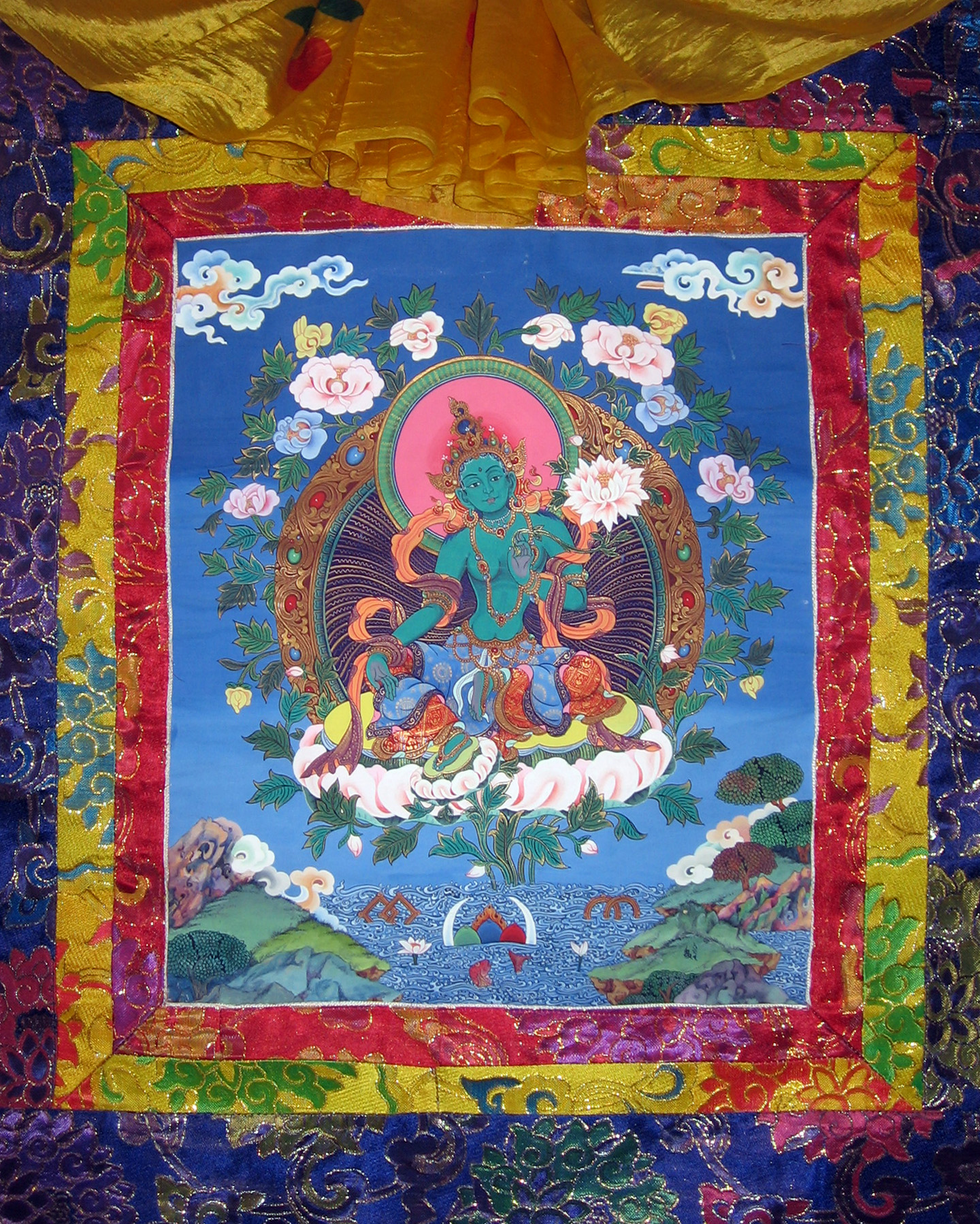
Waumha Tara (Green Tara)

A paubhā (Devanagari: पौभा) is a traditional religious painting made by the Newar people of Nepal. Paubhās depict deities, mandalas or monuments, and are used to help the practitioners in meditation. The Tibetan equivalent is known as thangka. The main difference between thangka and paubha is that thangka is a Buddhist art, while paubha is used for both Hindu and Buddhist art by the Newar community.

The traditional painters of paubhās are the Chitrakar caste who are known as Pun (पुं) in Nepal Bhasa.

== History ==
A paubhā of Amitabha Buddha at the Los Angeles County Museum is believed to be the earliest specimen which is done in a style dating from the 11th century (Nepal Sambat 485). It is a specimen of the skill of Newar artists that made them sought-after throughout the Himalayan region and as far as China. Newar artists and merchants took the paubhā art to Tibet from which the Tibetan thangka evolved.

== The painting ==
Paubhās are painted on a rectangular piece of canvas. It is prepared by applying a mixture of buffalo glue and white clay on it. The surface is then rubbed with a smooth stone to give it polish. The painting is done according to the rules and dimensions handed down by tradition, and artists cannot exercise their creativity.

The paint is made from minerals and plants. Gold and silver paint are also used on paubhās. The eyes of the deity are painted when the rest of the painting has been completed, and is known as "mikhā chāyekegu" (opening the eyes). Brocade is sewn to the edge of the paubhā to make a frame for display.

From a composition perspective, the surface of Paubhā is usually occupied of a large figure in the center that is placed inside a shrine and surrounded by registers of smaller figures on the sides; the background is usually filled in with natural elements such as rocks rendered in abstract patterns. The color is often deep and subdued with subtle shadings of the figures and exquisite renderings of details that are the hallmarks of early Nepalese paubhās

== Exhibitions ==
An annual exhibition of statues of Dipankara Buddha and paubhās is held in sacred courtyards in the Kathmandu Valley. The ceremony is known as Bahidyah Bwayegu (बहीद्यः ब्वयेगु), and is held during the month of Gunla. Gunla, which corresponds to August, is a holy month for Newar Buddhists. Groups of devotees led by musical bands make a tour of the courtyards to view the displays. In recent times, the traditional exhibitions have become fewer and shorter due to fear of art thieves.

== Contemporary Paubhā ==
20th Century is a traditional Nepalese painting that depicts Buddhas, Buddhist deities and Hindu gods in detail with rock paint. In the latter half of the 20th century, a painter incorporating Western-style realistic expressions appeared, but in recent years he strongly pushed that tendency, especially using oil painting, contemporary jewelry with vibrant color

Most of the paubhās have no name and date due to religious practice paint. Anandamuni Shakya was born in (1903- 1944), close to the Buddhist temple of Itum-bahal in the old market area of Kathmandu. His paubhā has contemporary touch and Udaya Charan Shrestha born in 1964 heart of Kathmandu who follows Ananda Muni’s style, Being Newar Shrestha’s deep knowledge of rituals and objects in daily life are also the recourses in his way of paubhā paintings, visualization of his circumstances and he applied dynamic compositions in his painting which is a unique and influence of modernity including contemporary jewelries use in his art.

== See also ==
- Ashtimki painting
- Madhubani art
