= Ashtimki =

Festival in Nepal

Ashtimiki
- Observed by: Tharu people
- Type: Hindu
- Significance: Birth of Lord Krishna
- Celebrations: Singing, dancing, fasting

Ashtimki is a Tharu cultural festival celebrated in the Western region of Nepal, on the day of Krishna Janmashtami. During the festival, the people of Tharu community draw a special artwork known as Ashtimki Chitra. The artwork is made on the wall of the living room of the house of the village elder. The art in painting is believed to be related to the creation of the universe.

== Etymology ==
The word Ashtimki originates from two words: Ashtami and Tika. Ashtami is the eighth day in a Hindu month and Hinduism deity Krishna was born on the 8th day of the waning moon phase of the Bhadra month and tika is a holy mark worn usually on the forehead.

== Celebrations ==
The people of the Tharu community fast all day on this festival. Before the fasting, Tharu people wake up in the morning before the rooster crows to eat some food (dhar bhat/ Bhinsahrya) to prepare for the fasting. In the evening, people bathe in the river or well, and then gather at the house of Mathawa (village elder) and perform the religious rites. The Ashtimki painting made on the wall while singing the Ashtimki song in the house of Mathawa is worshiped by everyone in turn. It is from this Ashtimki festival that the Harya Gurai period of the Tharu community begins. In the month of Baishakh or Jeth, Dhurraya Gurai is celebrated, after which dancing and singing is restricted. The dancing and singing festivities commences on Harya Gurai(Harrheri).

The next day, on the second day of Ashtimki, people get up in the morning, gather at the house of the village elder which had been worshiped on the previous day, and take the worship material and dispose it off in the nearby river. After the worship material is washed in the river, the fasting of the devotees is completed and they return to their respective homes and perform rituals with food.
