= Ashtimki painting =

Nepalese painting style

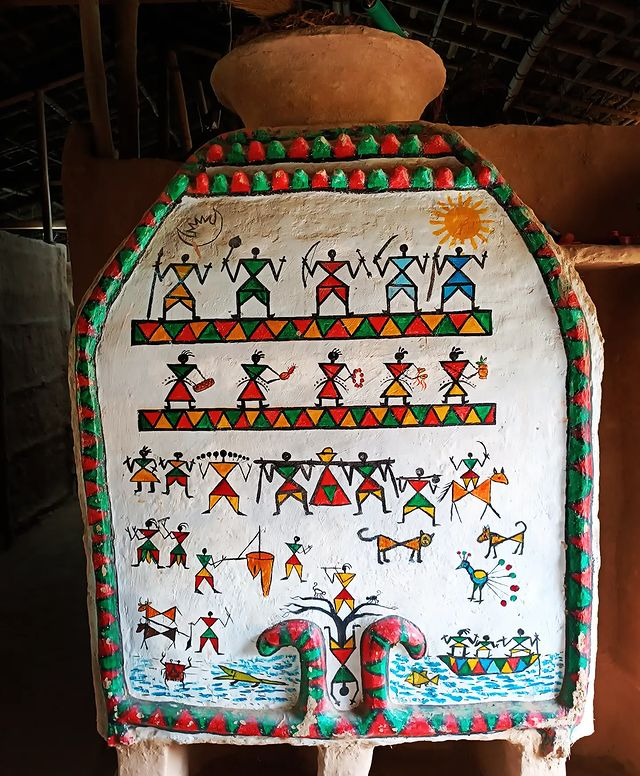
Ashtimki, a wall painting done by Tharus on the occasion of Krishna Janmashtami

Ashtimki Chitra (Nepali: अष्टिम्की चित्र, lit. 'Ashtimki painting') is a type of painting drawn on the day of Ashtimki festival celebrated by the Tharu community in the western region of Nepal.

== Significance ==
The painting is made on the wall of the house using home-made colors that make the painting unique and beautiful. It is done on the day of Lord Krishna's birthday, Krishna Janmashtami at Tharu elder Mahatawa's house.

The colors are made from red clay (red), bean leaves (green) and burnt wild grass (black).

== Symbolism ==
The painting depicts the story of evolution. The main components of the painting are Kanha (Krishna), a kadam tree, a boat, fish, crabs, tortoise, monkeys and other animals, a ten headed demon (Ravana), Pandava, Draupadi, a sun and a moon. Lately, the artists have been adding other animals to the painting. These characters are marked with tika on the painting as the ritual function of the Ashtimki festival.

== See also ==
- Madhubani art
- Paubha
