= Denhari =

Nepalese food storage vessel

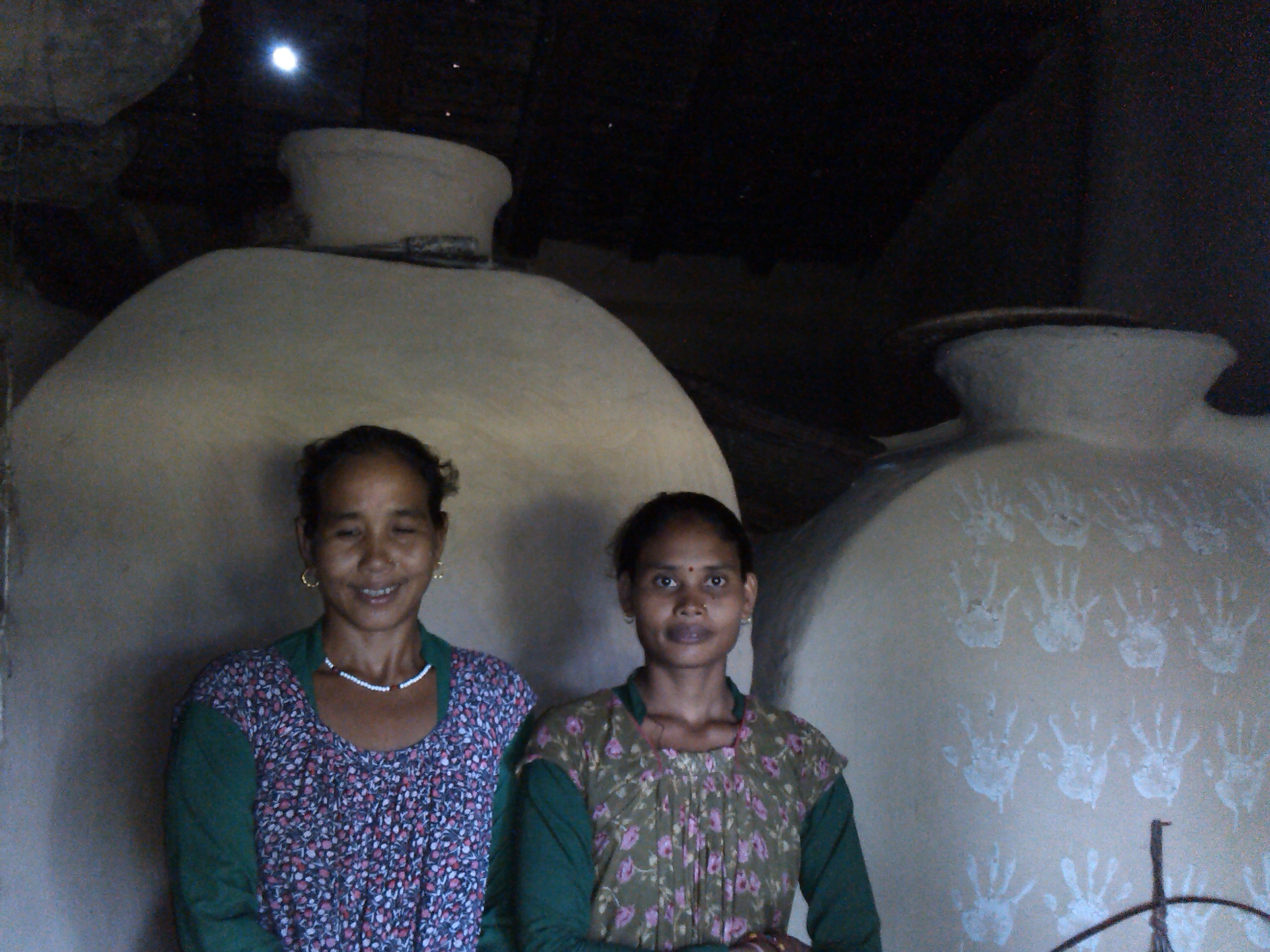
Tharu Women with their Bhakari(Dehari in Tharu)

Denhari (Nepali: देनहरि) or Dehari(Nepali: देहारि) is a traditional earthen vessel used to store food grains by Tharu people of Nepal. It is made by using loamy clay, paddy straw and rice husk and has a round, rectangular or conical shapes. It is mostly made by females and mostly used to store paddy, wheat, rice, maize, lentils, peas and mustard seeds.

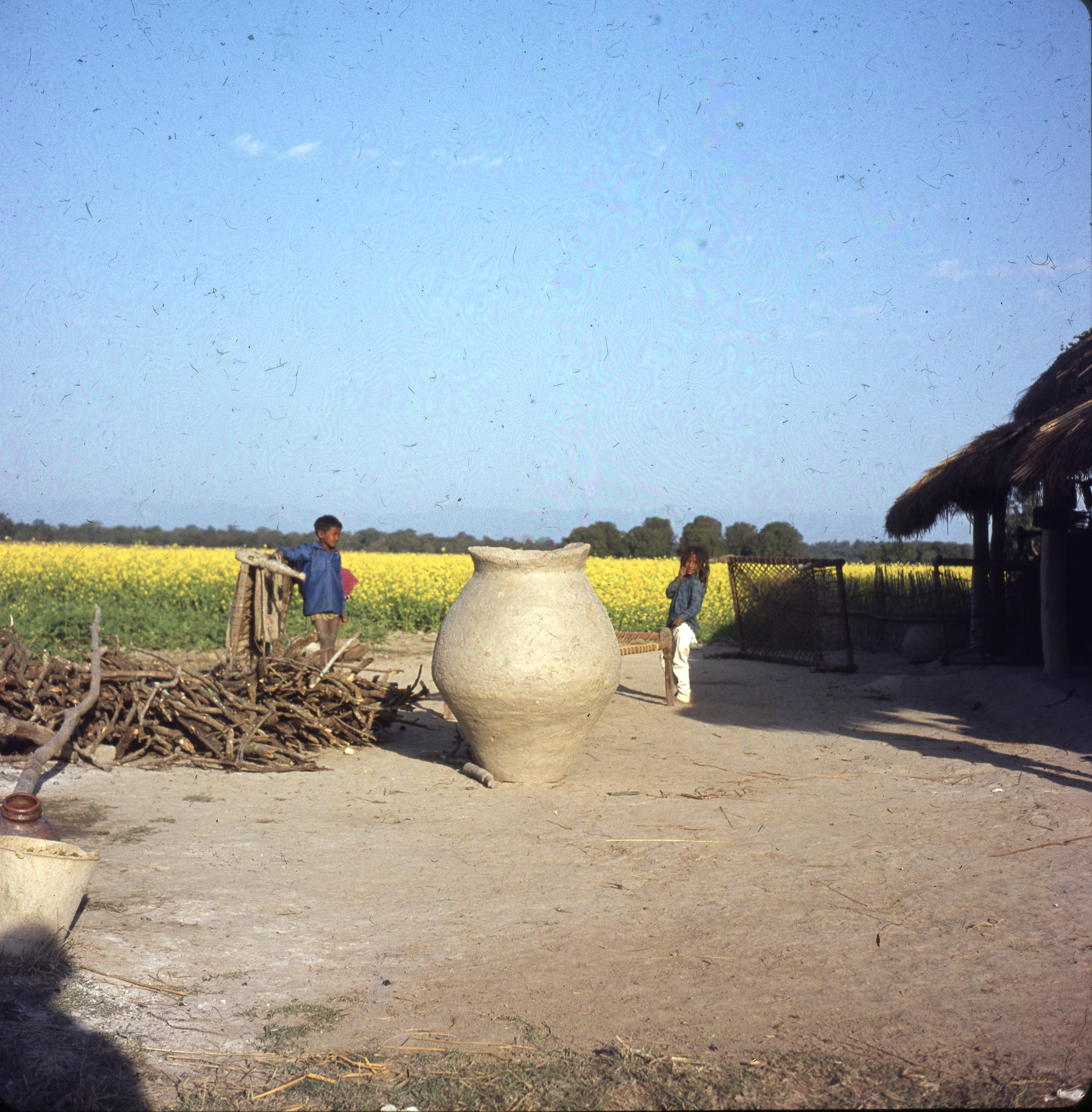
Denhari

The vessel is also an integral part of religious festival and cultural activities. There is a tradition of breaking a special Denhari called Pataha Denhari during the marriage of daughter and the food grains stored in it is given to her.

It is believed that the grains stored in Denhari does not decay or get infested with insects. Among the Tharu community, Denhari is never kept empty as it would be a bad omen.
