= Lathi Nach =

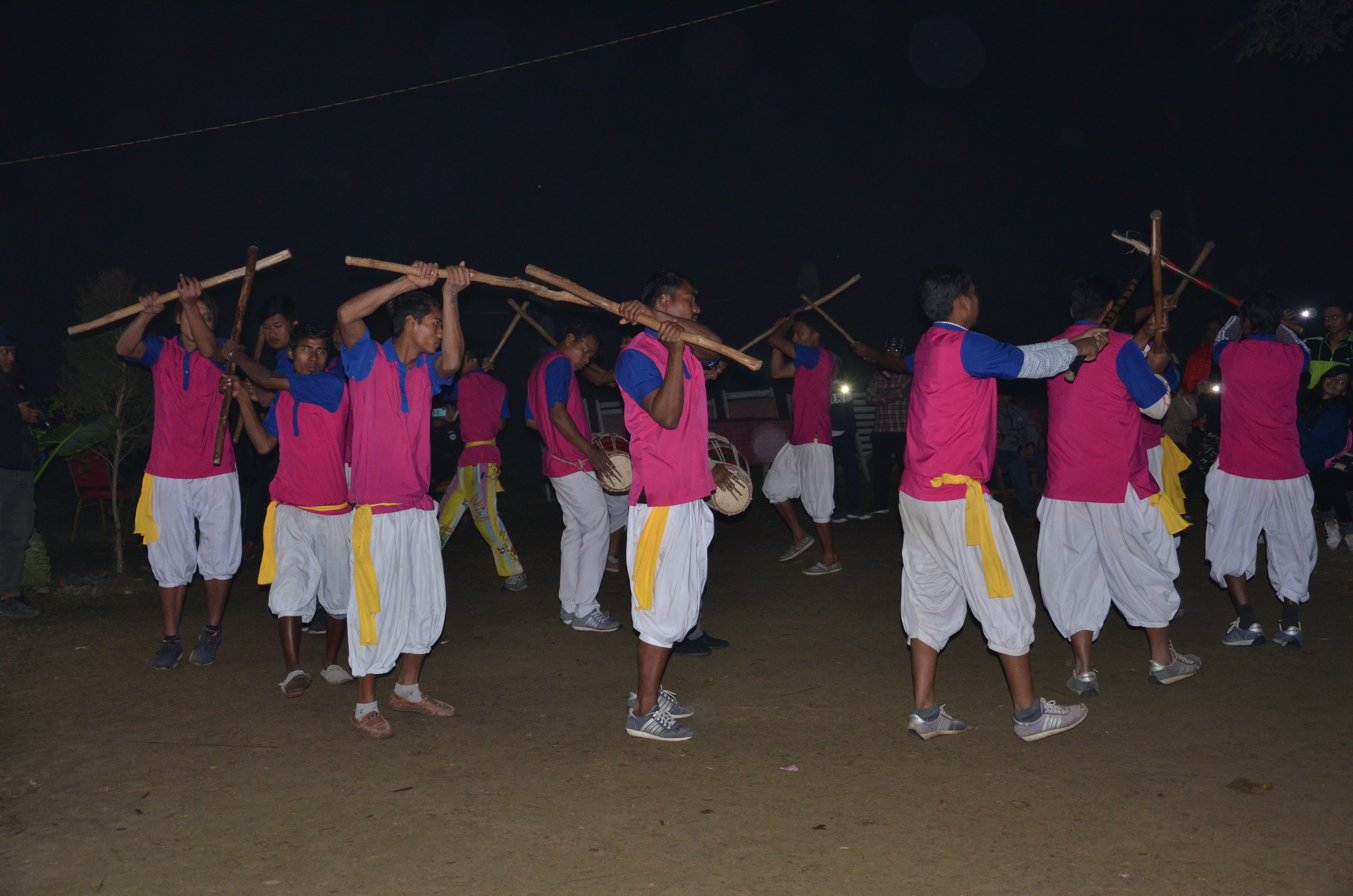
- Tharu women performing stick dance in Chitwan district
- Native name: लाठी नाच
- Etymology: Stick dance
- Genre: Cultural dance
- Instrument: Wooden stick
- Inventor: Tharu people

Lathi Nach or Jharra Nach also known as Tharu stick dance is a cultural dance of the Tharu people. This dance is mainly performed during the Dashain festival. It is performed to the rhythm of stick-on-stick striking by the participants. It is similar to Dandiya Raas, performed in the Indian state of Gujarat, but varies in movement and style.

== Symbolic meaning ==
The Tharu people, like many indigenous communities, have a strong connection with nature. The use of sticks in their dance symbolize their relationship with the environment, acting as an extension of their daily interactions with the natural world. It also symbolize the Tharu's need to protect themselves and their crops from wildlife threats. Moreover, the dance carries profound cultural significance, taking center stage during festivals, weddings, and various celebratory events. It serves as a captivating means of artistic expression, skillfully conveying the community's history and values.

== Tourism ==
Tharu Stick Dance has evolved into a notable attraction for tourists, offering them a window into the cultural richness of Nepal. It plays an important role in safeguarding and transmitting the Tharu's distinct cultural identity across generations. Laathi Nach has become a popular tourist attraction in Nepal, particularly Chitwan.
