= Chaku (Newari cuisine) =

Newa and/or Nepalese candy

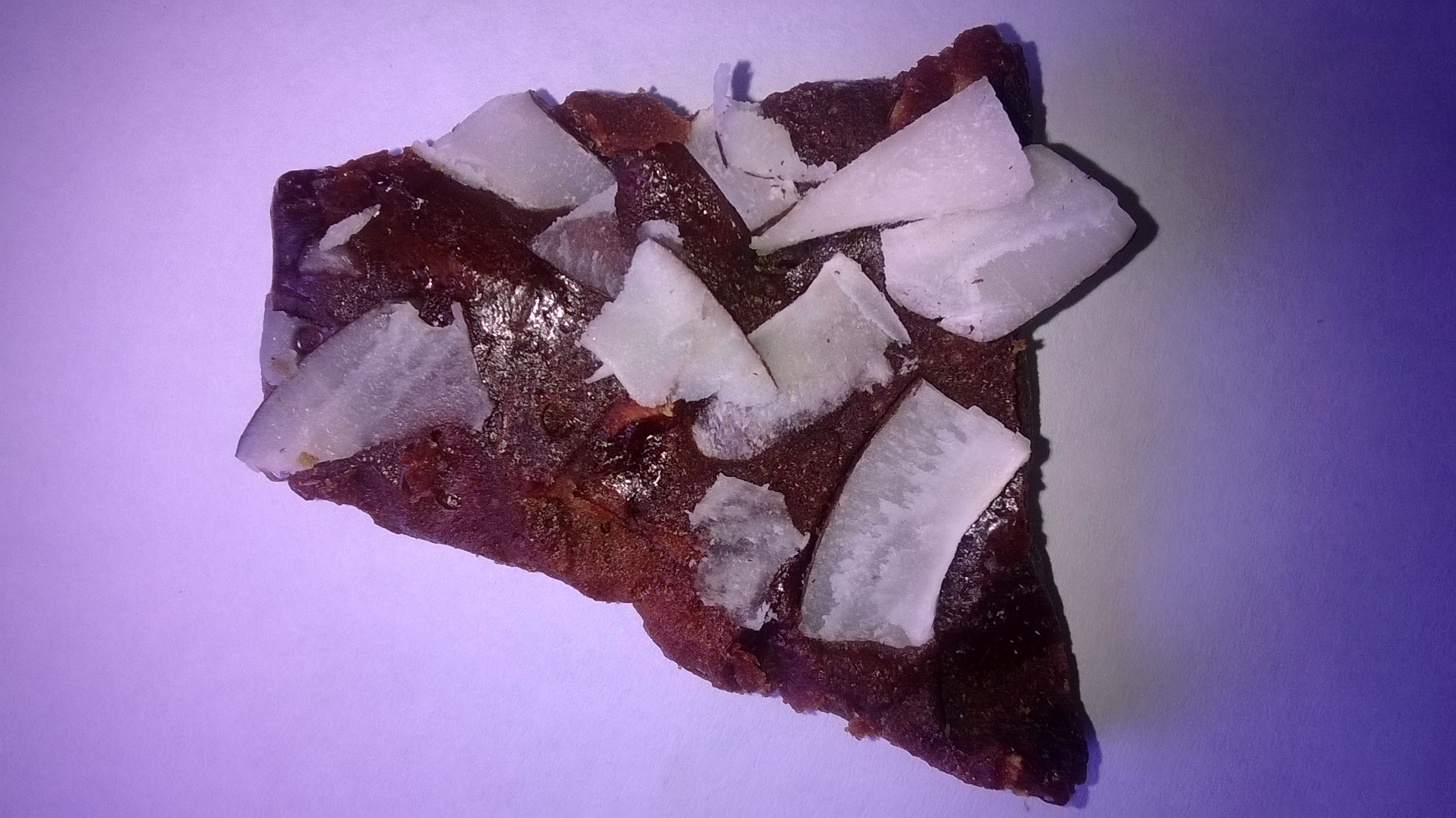
Chaku

Chaku (Nepali: चाकु pronounced [ˈt͡saku]) is a confectionery made by Newar people and is popular in the Kathmandu Valley. It is made from concentrated sugarcane juice, jaggery, ghee, and nuts. The mixture is cooked until it attains a solid form, and then pulled on a hook in a manner similar to making taffy and then cut into small rolls. It may also be cooked in a shallow dish and cut into small diamond-shaped pieces. Chaku may be eaten separately, or it can also be used in making Yomari (योमरी).

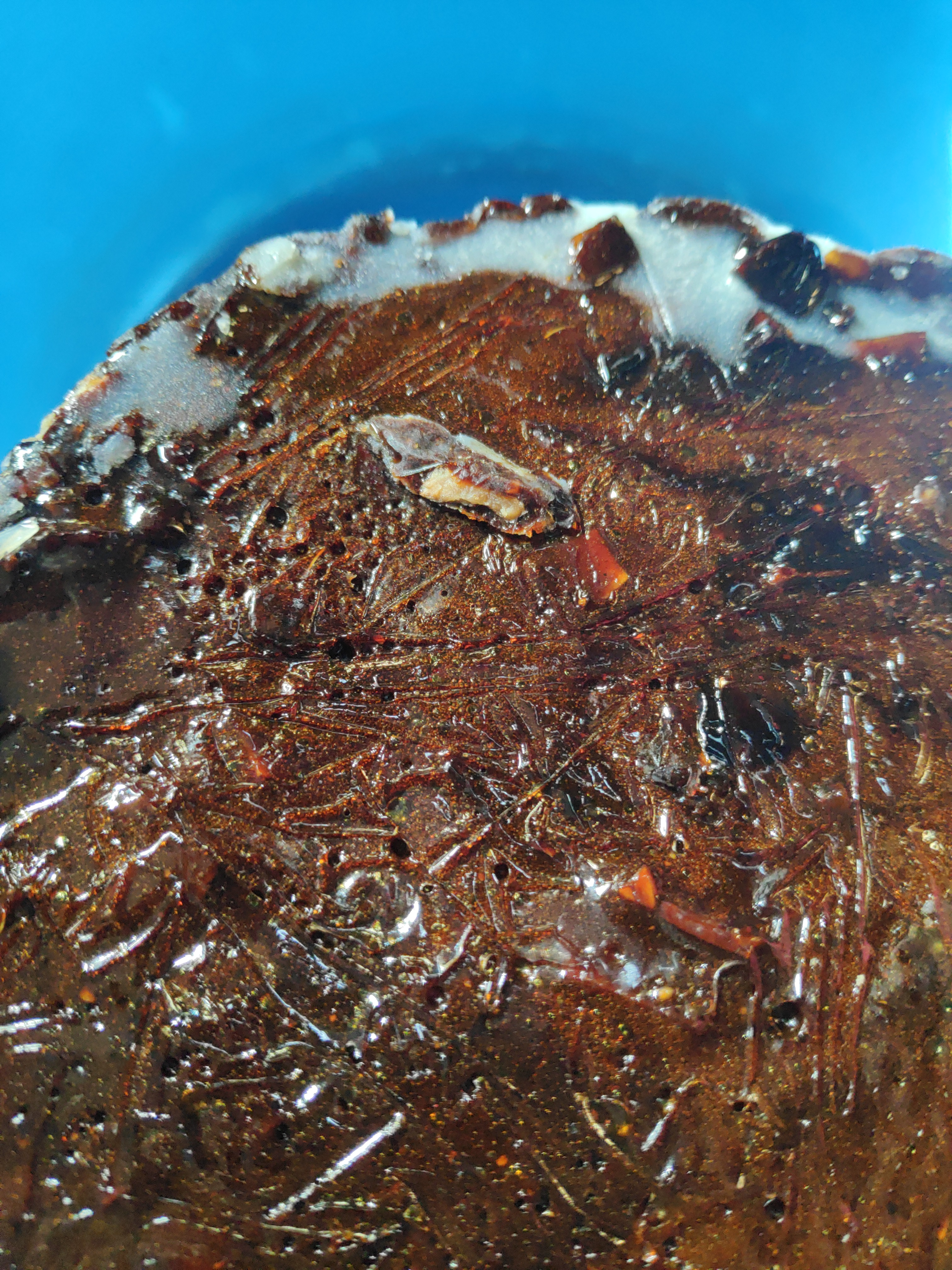
Chaku

Chaku is served by Nepalese with ghee and Yams during the festival of Maghe Sankranti.

== See also ==
- List of Nepalese dishes
