= Nepalese cuisine =

Culinary traditions of Nepal

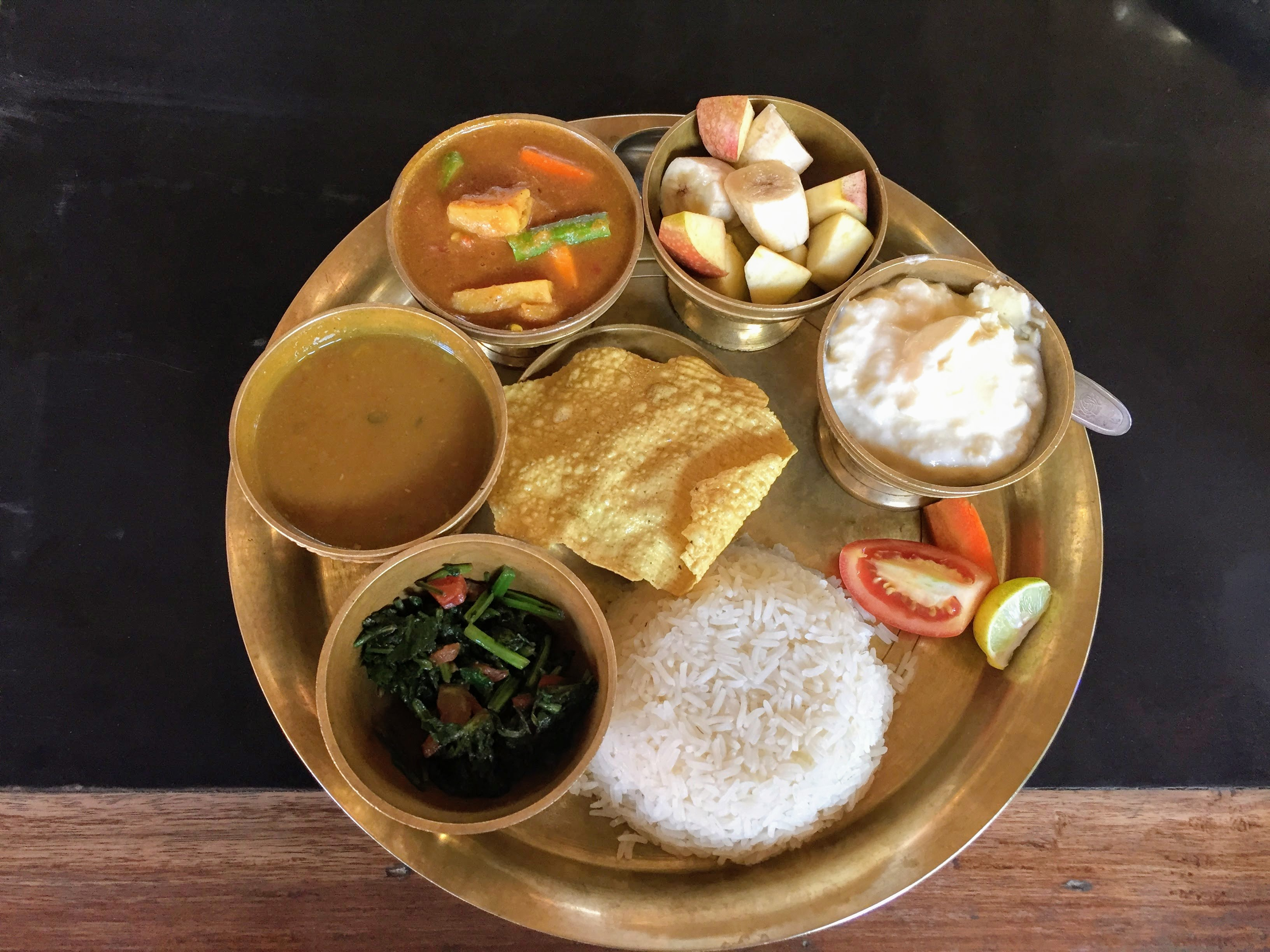
Nepali dal-bhat-tarkari

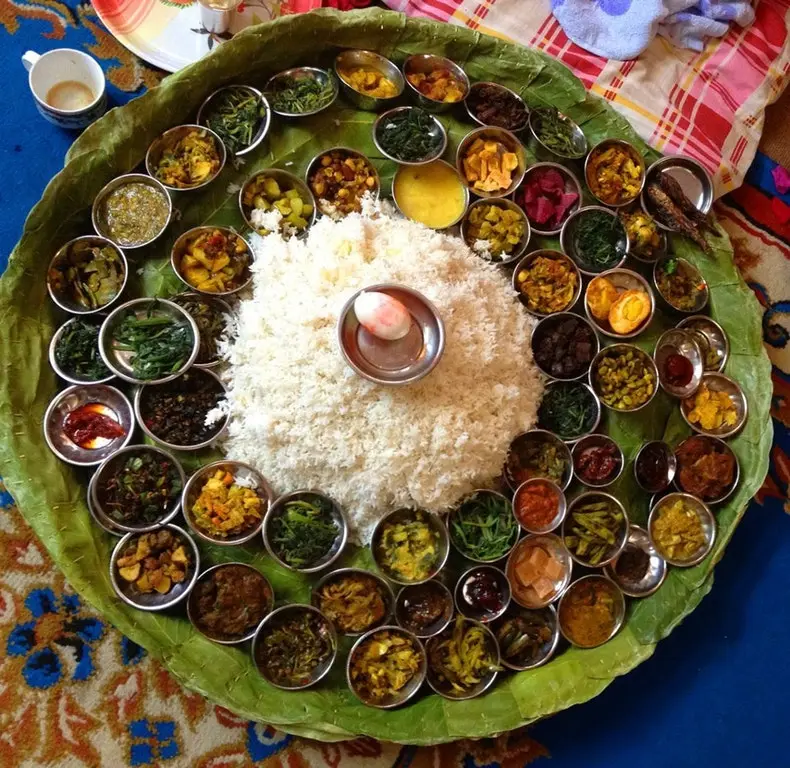
84 byanjan food with rice on a leaf platter

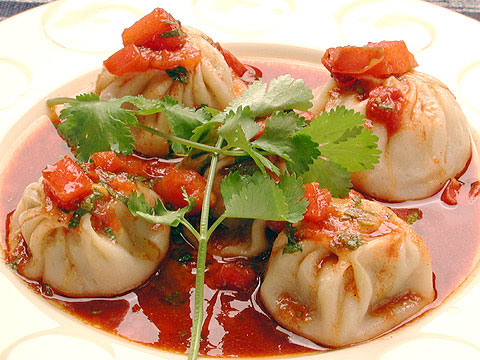
Nepali-style momo with chili

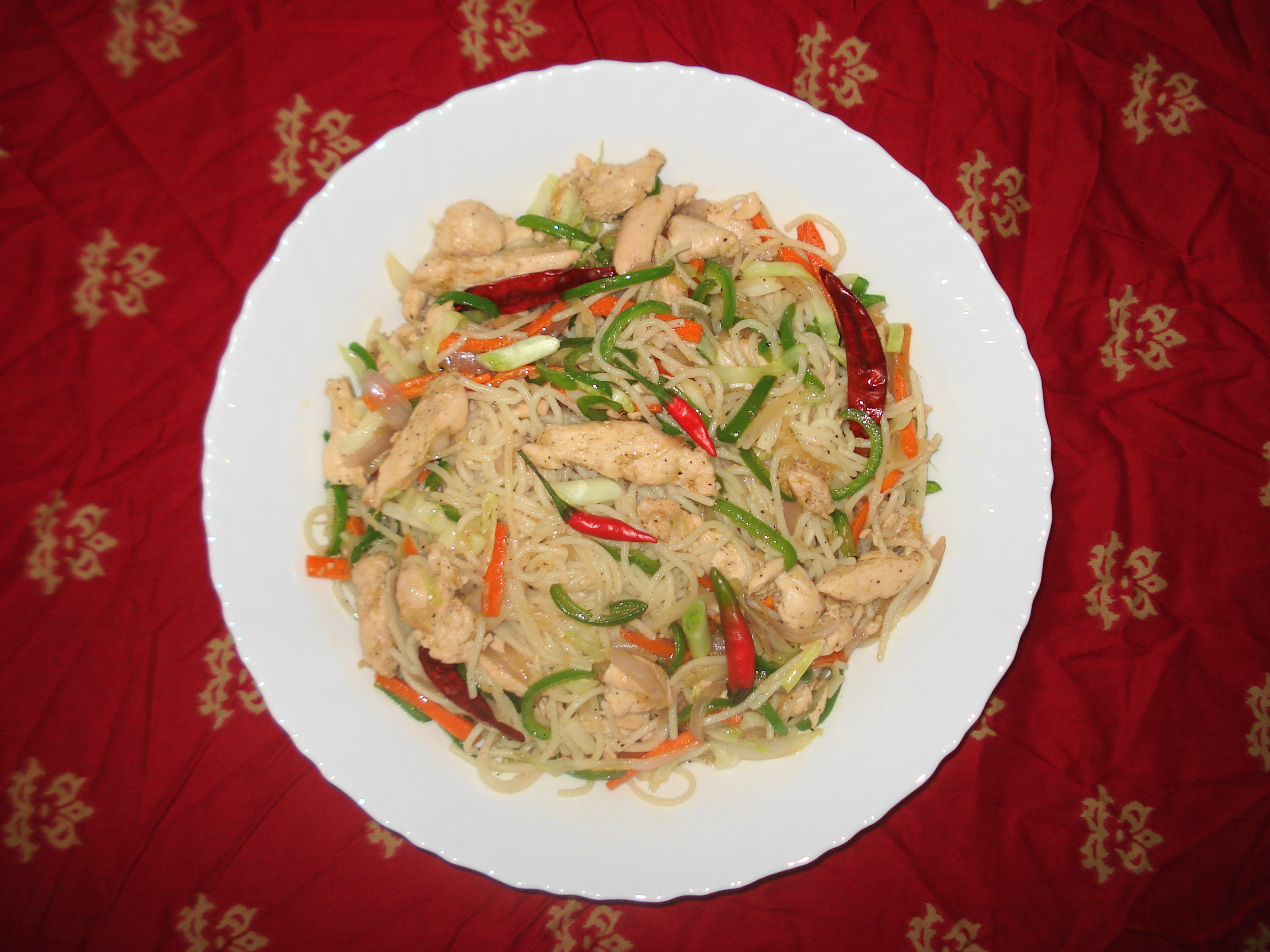
Nepali-style hot chicken chow mein

Nepali cuisine comprises a variety of cuisines based upon ethnicity, alluvial soil and climate relating to cultural diversity and geography of Nepal and neighboring regions of Sikkim and Gorkhaland. Dal-bhat-tarkari (Nepali: दाल भात तरकारी) is eaten throughout Nepal. Dal is a soup made of lentils and spices, bhat—usually rice but sometimes another grain—and a vegetable curry, tarkari. Condiments are usually small amounts of spicy pickle (achaar, अचार) which can be fresh or fermented, mainly of dried mustard greens (called gundruk ko achar) and radish (mula ko achar) and of which there are many varieties. Other accompaniments may be sliced lemon (nibuwa) or lime (kagati) with fresh green chilli (hariyo khursani) and a fried papad and also Islamic food items such as rice pudding, sewai, and biryani. Dhindo (ढिंडो) is the national dish of Nepal, primarily made from flour of millet and is served with achar of gundruk 'dried spinach'. A typical example of Nepali cuisine is the Chaurasi Byanjan (Nepali: चौरासी व्यञ्जन) set where bhat (rice) is served in a giant leaf platter (patravali) along with 84 different Nepali dishes each served on small plates. It is mostly served during weddings and Pasni (rice feeding ceremony).

Momo is a Himalayan dumpling, filled with minced meat in a flour dough, given different shapes and then cooked by steaming. It is one of the most popular foods in Nepal and the regions of Sikkim, Darjeeling and Kalimpong in India where Nepali-speaking Indians have a presence. Momo were originally filled with buffalo meat but are now commonly filled with goat or chicken, as well as vegetarian preparations. Special foods such as sel roti, finni roti and patre are eaten during festivals such as Tihar. Sel roti is a traditional Nepali homemade ring-shaped rice bread which is sweet to taste. Other foods have hybrid Tibetan and Indian influence.

Chow mein is a Nepali favorite in modern times based on Chinese-style stir-fried noodles. It is one of the most beloved everyday staple lunches in Nepali households.

== Dishes ==
=== Drinks ===
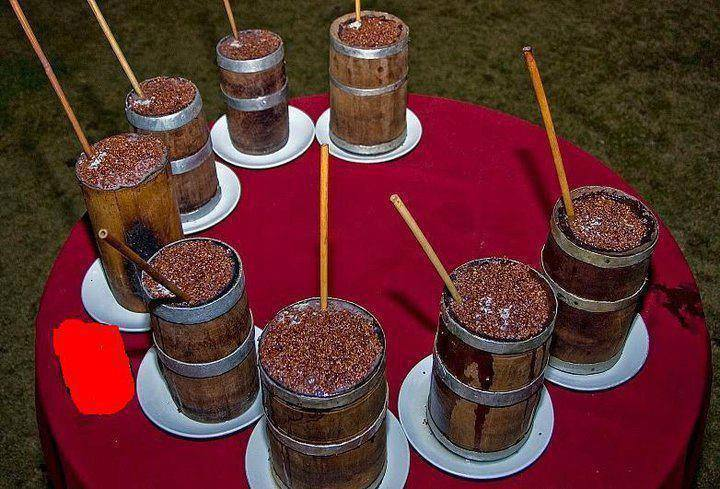
Tongba: Limbu style, hot millet beer

Tea (chiya) usually taken with milk and sugar, juice of sugarcane (sarbat), and buttermilk (mahi) are common non-alcoholic drinks. Alcoholic drinks include raksi, spirits made in rustic distilleries, and jaand/jard, homemade beer made from rice. At higher elevations there is millet beer Tongba, nigaar and chhyaang.

=== Pickles ===
In Nepal, achaar (Nepali: अचार) is commonly eaten with the staple dal-bhat-tarkari as well as momo. Many achaar factories in Nepal are women-owned or operated by women.

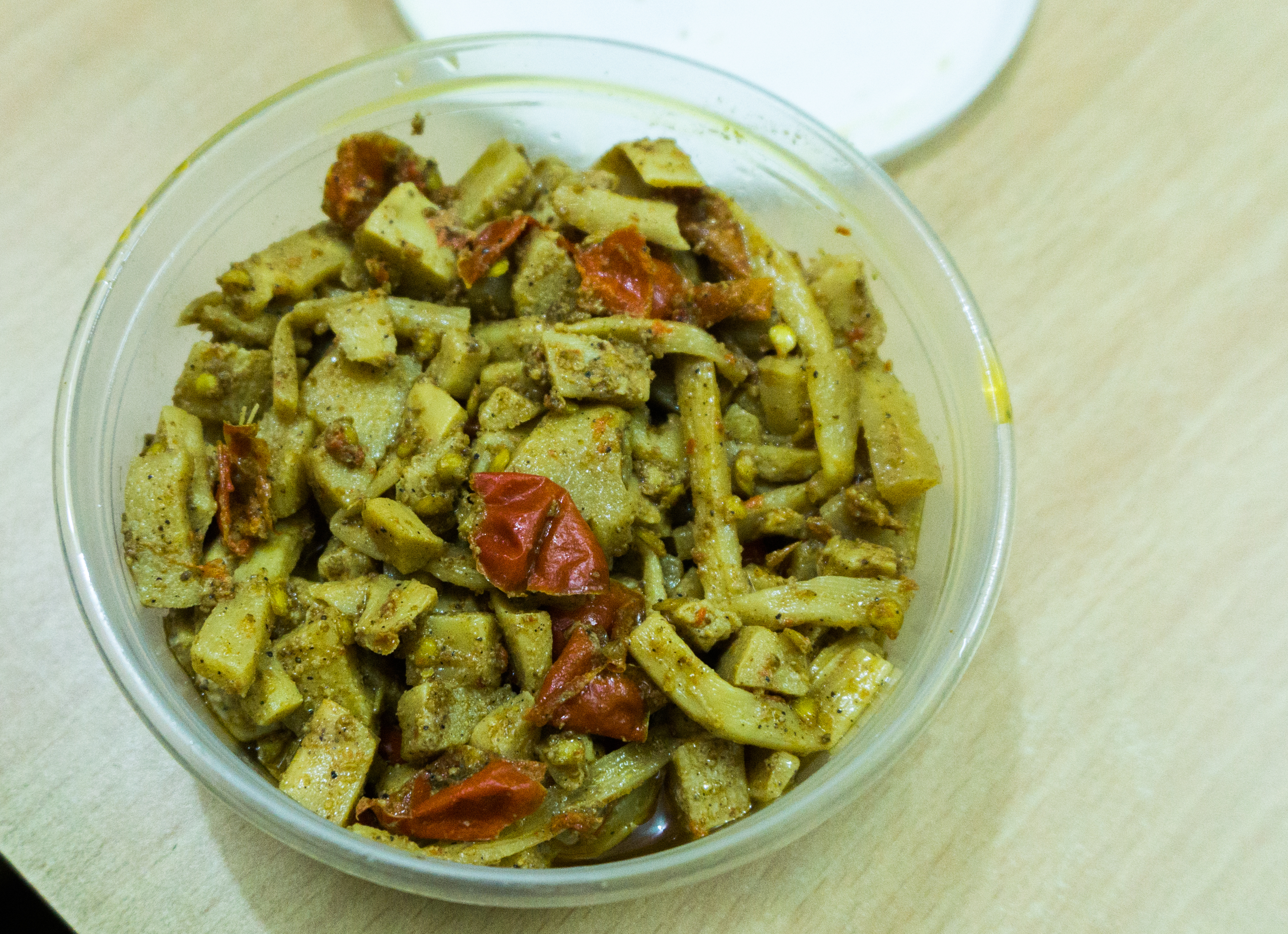
Nepali pickle made of Dalle Khursani (round chilies) and Tama (fermented bamboo shoot pickle)

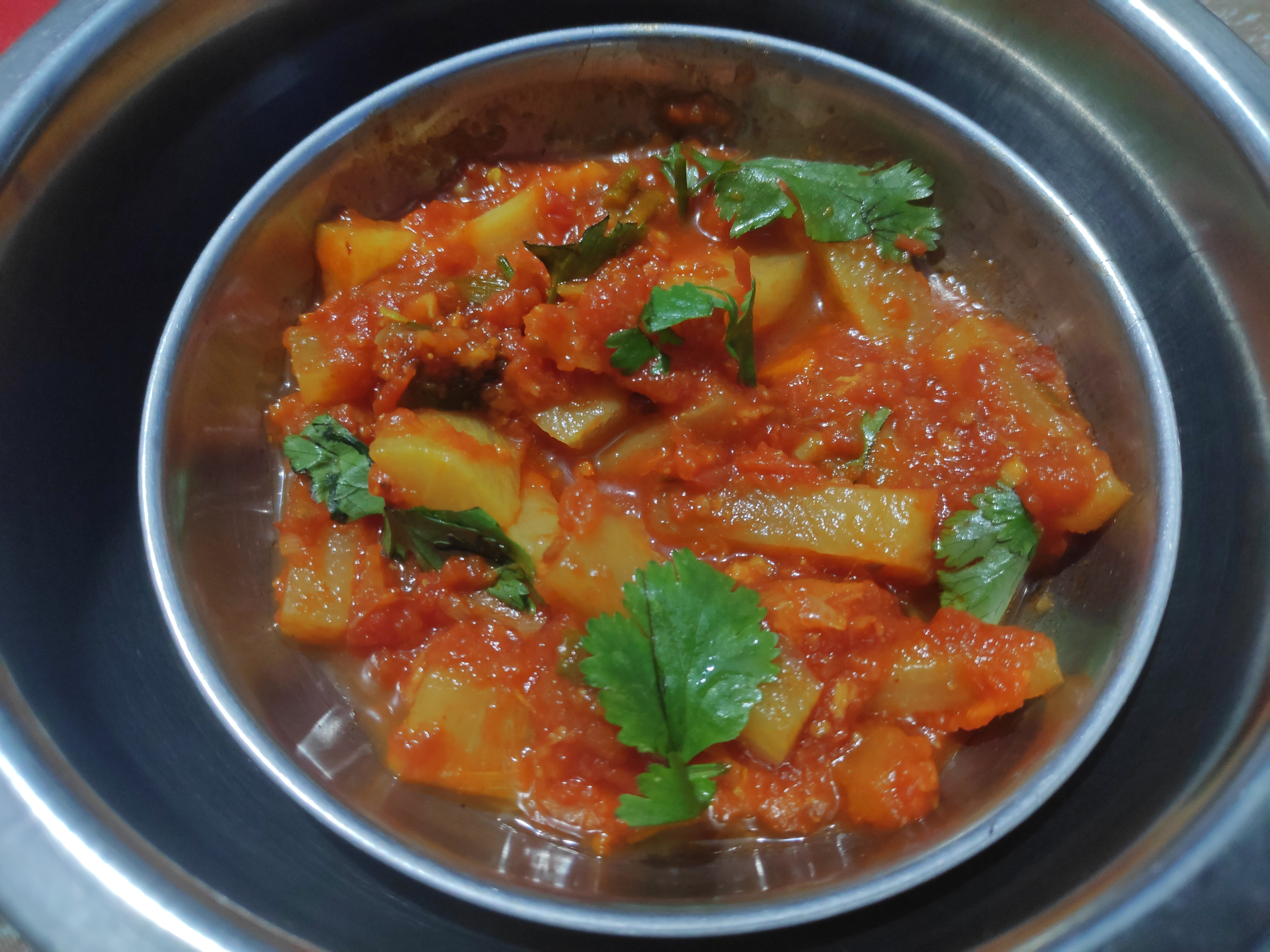
Mula Ko Aachar

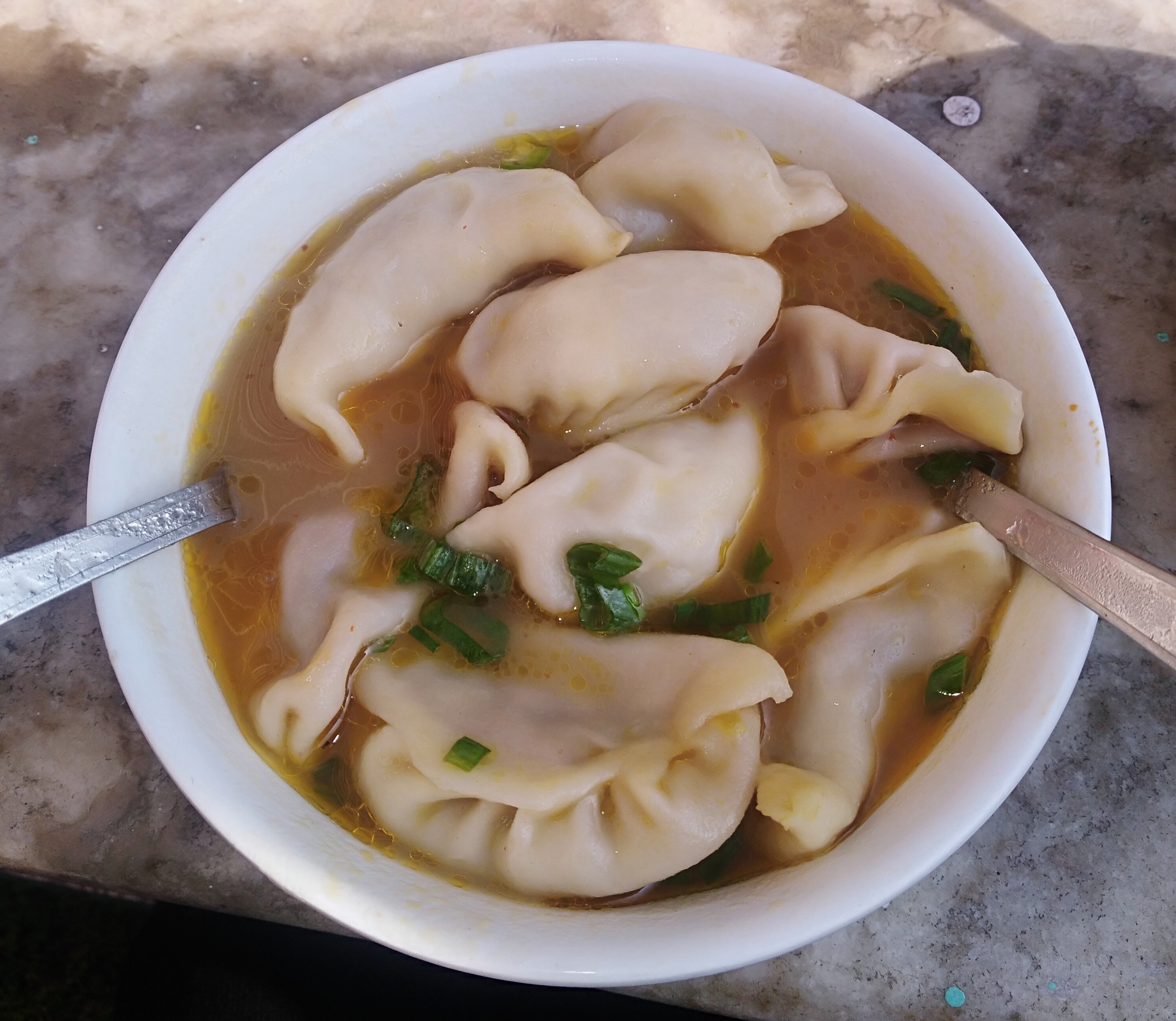
Broth made from achar used for jhol momo

=== Snacks ===
Snacks is called khaja in Nepali. It includes maize popped or parched, beaten rice (baji or chiura), dry-roasted soybeans (bhatmas, Nepali: भटमास), dried fruit candy (lapsi), and South Asian foods like the samosa and South Asian sweets. International snacks like biscuits (packaged cookies), potato chips and wai wai (Nepali: वाइ वाइ, instant noodles) are all coming into widespread use. Whereas, some youths in Nepal prefer western snacks as they are easy to get and less time-consuming.

=== Sweets ===
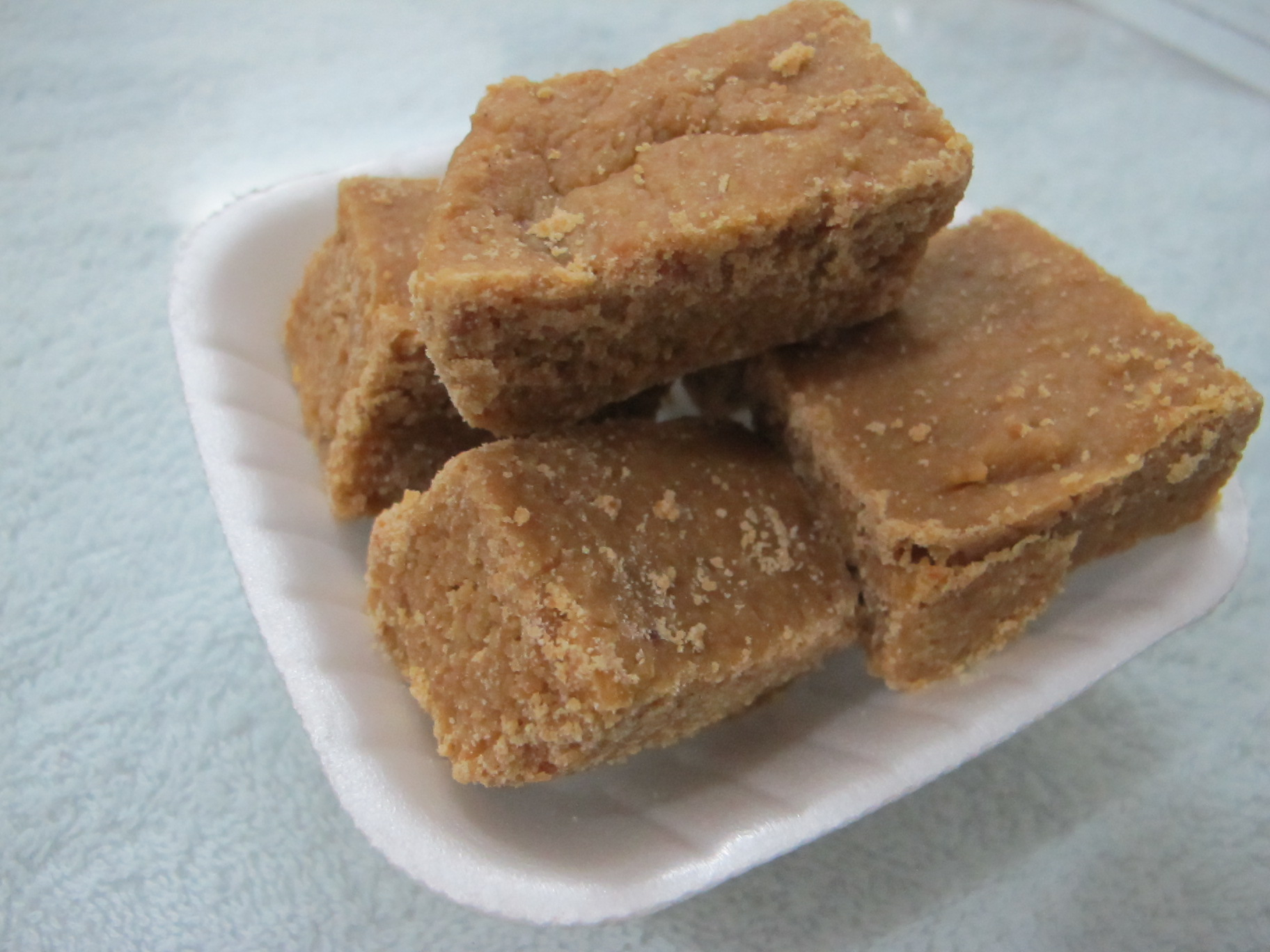
Simple barfi made with milk and sugar

Nepal produces a variety of fruits (persimmons, apples, mangoes, tangerines, kiwis) and nuts that are featured in locally prepared sweets. Dessert is not a well-established concept in the Nepali cuisine and sweets made with milk, yogurt and cheese are often eaten for breakfast as standalone meals. Sometimes grated carrots are used instead of flour, or semolina, rice, corn or puffed lotus seeds. Barfi is made with some combination of lentils, fruits, flour and thickened milk.

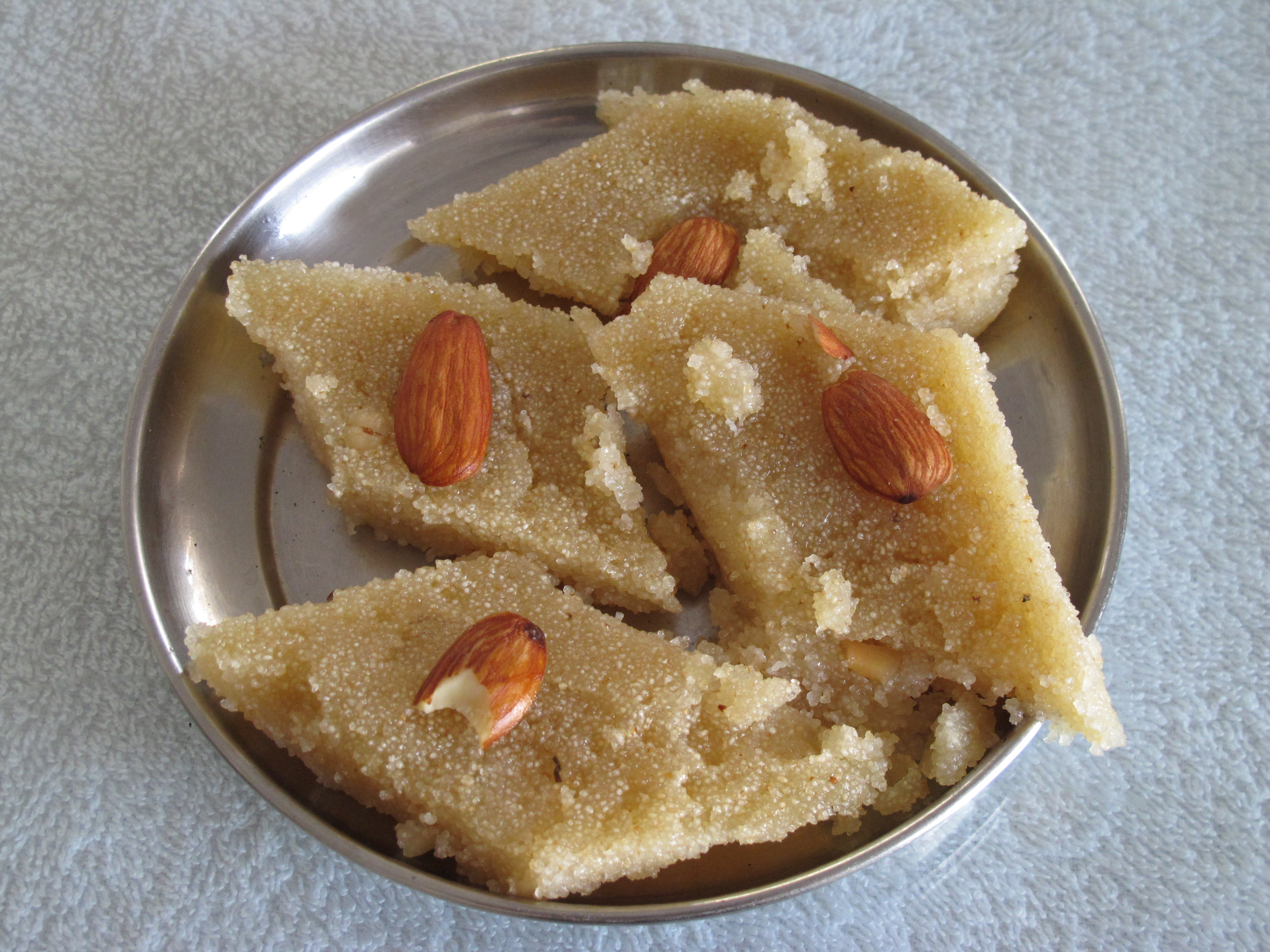
Semolina halva

Halwa is a sweetened semolina pudding with green cardamom, cashews, raisins and shredded coconut. Like other Nepali sweets, Nepali puddings are prepared using ghee. Dumplings called lal mohan are deep fried like fritters and soaked in cardamom-flavored sweet syrup.

At the festival of Yomari Purnima celebrated in December, to thank the goddess of grains Annapurna after the harvest, the Newar make sweet dumplings (yomari) with rice flour filled with sesame seeds, and brown sugar or molasses. In the predominately Hindu country, sweet peda made with thickened milk (khuwaa) are offered to the Hindu gods.

== Regional cuisine ==
=== Khas cuisine ===
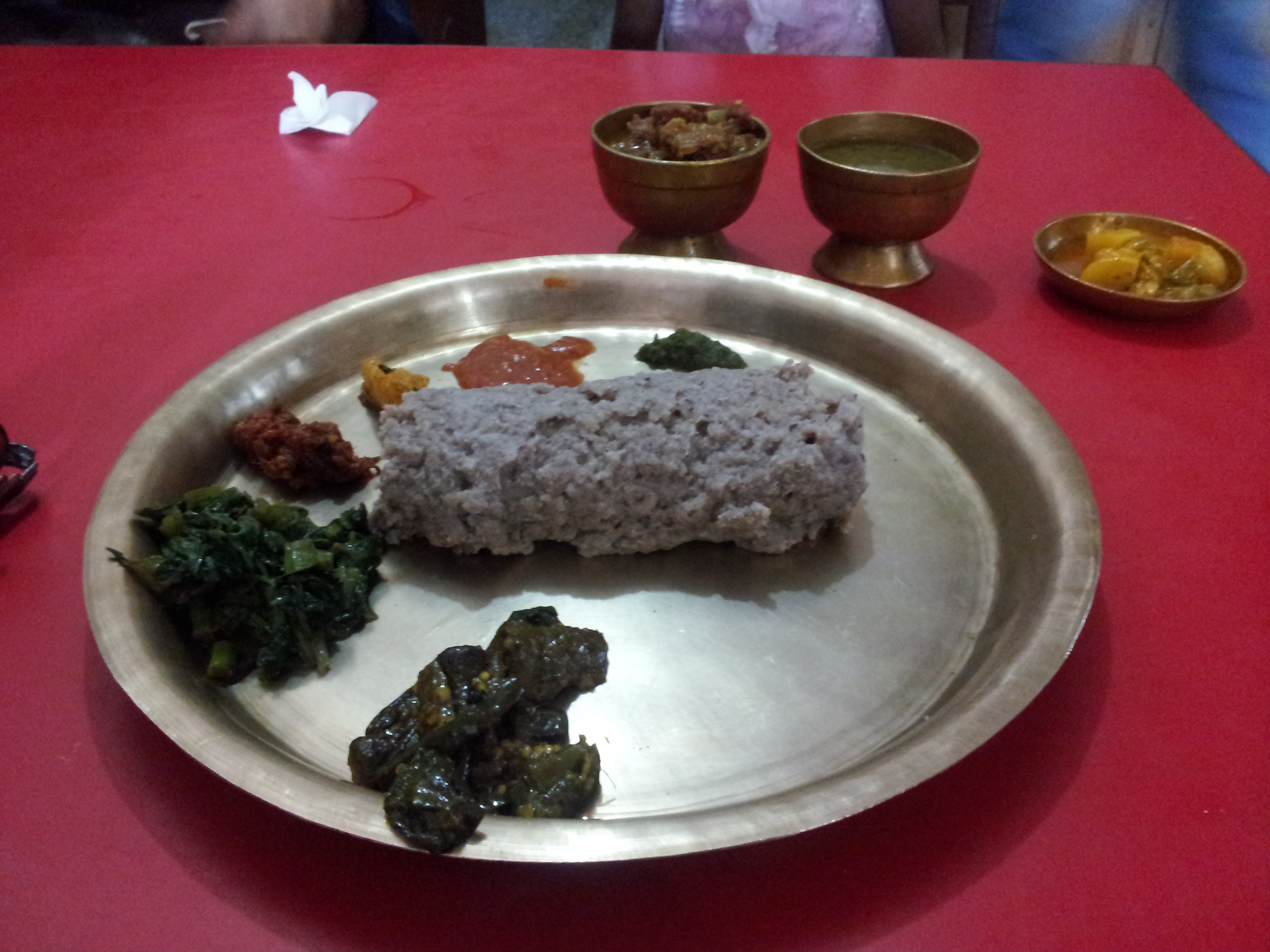
Dhindo thali in a Thakali restaurant of Nepal

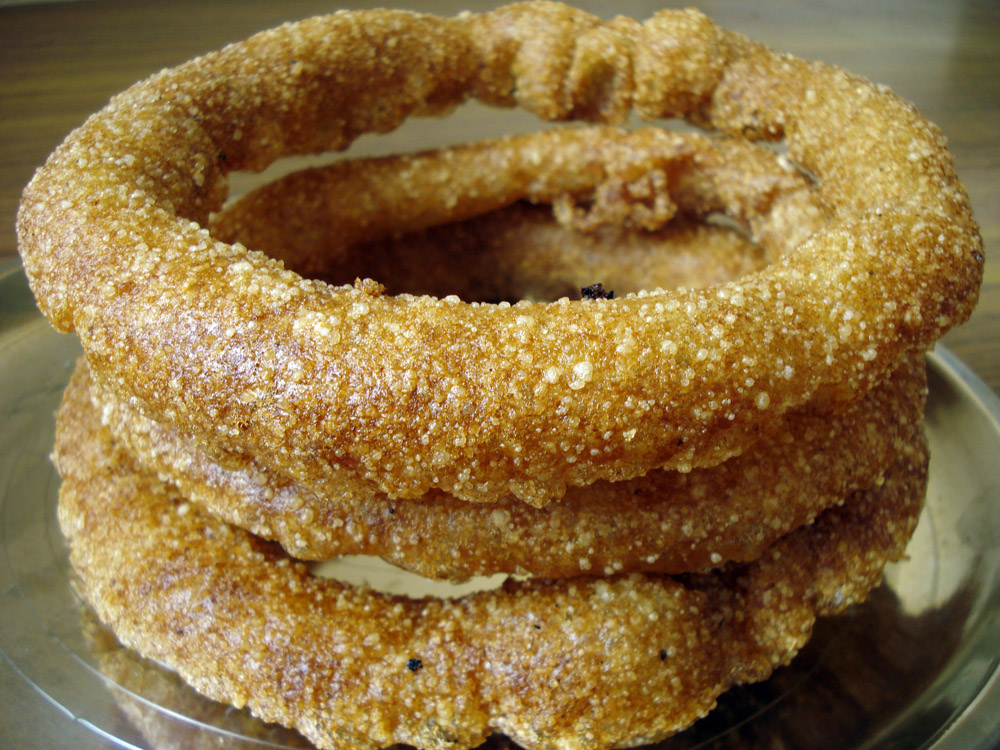
Nepali Bread Sel Roti

Dal-bhat-tarkari is the standard meal eaten twice daily traditionally by the Khas people. However, with land suitable for irrigated rice paddies in short supply, other grains supplement or even dominate. Wheat becomes unleavened flat bread (roti or chapati). Rice batter made flatbread called Maada roti is also eaten in western regions. Maize (makai), buckwheat (fapar), barley (jau), or millet (kodo) become porridge-like (dhido or ato). Tarkari can be spinach and fresh greens (sag), fermented and dried greens (gundruk or sinki), white radish (mula), potatoes (alu), green beans (simi), tomatoes (golbeda), cauliflower (kauli), cabbage (bandakopi), pumpkin (farsi), etc. The climate of the hilly region remains moderate throughout the year. This kind of climate is perfect for horticulture. Fruits traditionally grown in the hills include mandarin orange (suntala), kaffir lime (kagati), lemon (kaagati), Asian pear (nashpati), and bayberry (kaphal), mangoes (aanp), apples (syauu), peach (aaru), plum (aalcha or aarubakhara), apricot (kurpani) . In some seasons there is an excess amount of these fruits produced. These excess fruits are often preserved or otherwise made use of in the form of alcohol, pickles, dried fruits and fruit juice. These alcohol are also serves in a different rituals of Newari culture.

Dahi (yogurt) and curried meat (masu) or fish (machha) are served as side dishes when available. Chicken (kukhura) and fish are usually acceptable to all including the Khas Brahmin (Bahun) caste. Observant Hindus never eat beef (gai ko masu). They also eschew buffalo and yak meat as being too cow-like. Domestic pork (sungur ko masu) was traditionally only eaten by aadibasi, however wild boar (bangur ko masu) was traditionally hunted and eaten by magars. A strain derived from wild boar is now raised in captivity and used for meat that is increasingly popular with Pahari ethnicities and castes that did not traditionally eat pork. They however eat wild boar (bandel) as it is considered clean due to its forest habitat though they do not eat pork meat.

Another not much talked dish is chamre/chamrey,chamre/chamrey is a traditional khas rice dish the name is derived from khas bhasa rooted on the word 'chamal' referring rice or 'chamro' (firm/tough), referring its unique cooking technique where the is rice is heavily fried in ghee before water is added to keep for the grans firm. It can be sweet or savory

=== Limbu cuisine ===
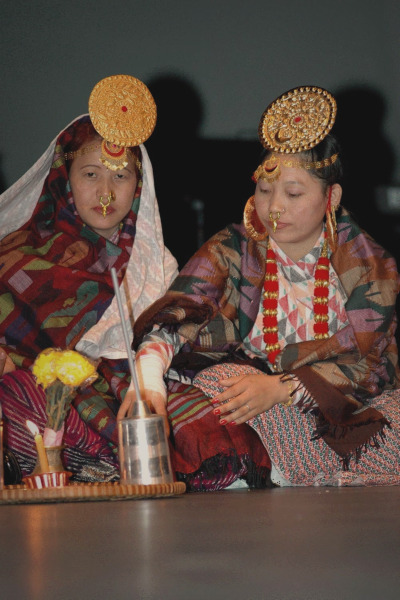
Limbu women with traditional drink Tongba

The Limbu have unique ethnic foods including kinema (fermented soybeans), yangben (Reindeer Moss), bamboo shoot preparations, millet- or buckwheat-based bread, and Limbu Tongba (a traditional millet beer). Pork, chicken is eaten in some Eastern regions like Dharan.

=== Lohorung cuisine ===
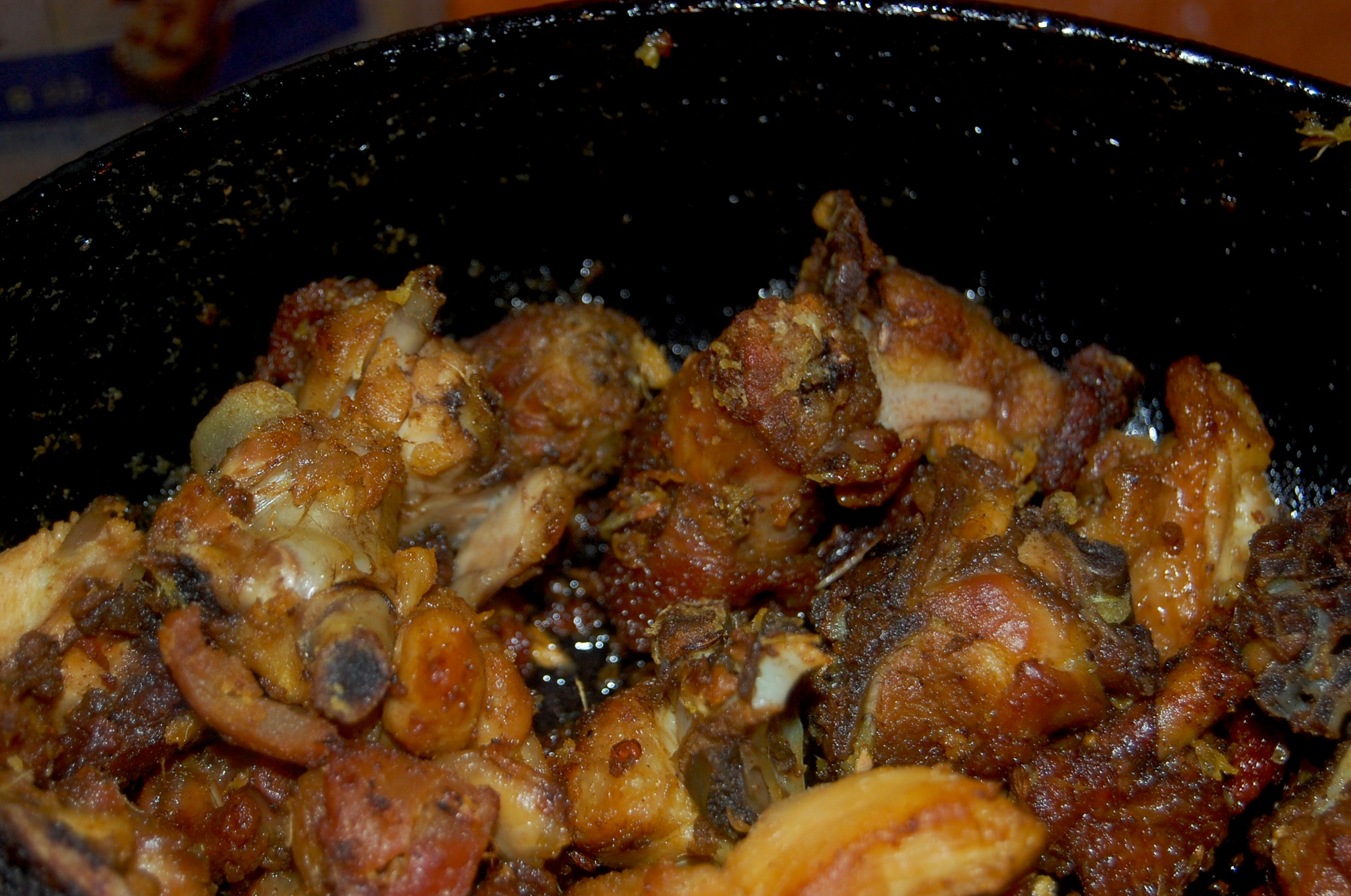
Fried chicken, Lohorung food

Lohorung are indigenous to eastern Nepal. They have a variety of food in their cuisine made from local ingredients. Some of them are Wachipa, Wamik, Masikdaam, Sibring, Sel roti, Bawari, Dhule Achar, Saruwa, Chamre, Dibu, and so on.

=== Madhesi cuisine ===
Food in the Madhesh Province south of Sivalik Hills refers to mirror cuisines such as Maithili cuisine in the east, Tharu cuisine in the west, and Bhojpuri cuisine in the center and near west of Madhesh province. Further west, there is Mughlai-influenced Awadhi cuisine—particularly eaten by the substantial Muslim population around Nepalganj bordering Madhesh region.

Madhesi diets can be more varied than in the Middle Hills because of greater variety of crops grown locally plus cash crops imported from cooler microclimates in nearby hill regions, as well as from other parts of Greater Nepal. Fruit commonly grown in the Madhesh include mango (aap), litchi, papaya (armewa/mewa), banana (kera/kela/kola) and jackfruit (katahar/katahal).

A typical Madhesi food set includes basmati rice with ghee (gheu), pigeon pea daal, tarkari (cooked variety of vegetable), tarua (battered raw vegetables known as taruwa/baruwa such as potato, brinjal/aubergine, chili, cauliflower etc. deep fried in the oil), papad/papadum, mango/lemon pickles and yogurt. For non-vegetable items, they consume mostly fish or goat curry. Traditionally there never used to be poultry items but nowadays, due to urbanization, poultry items are common, too.

=== Newa cuisine ===
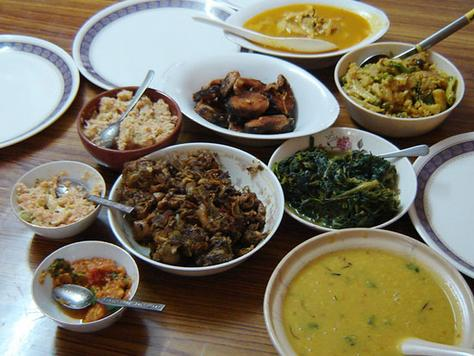
An elaborate Newa meal in Kathmandu

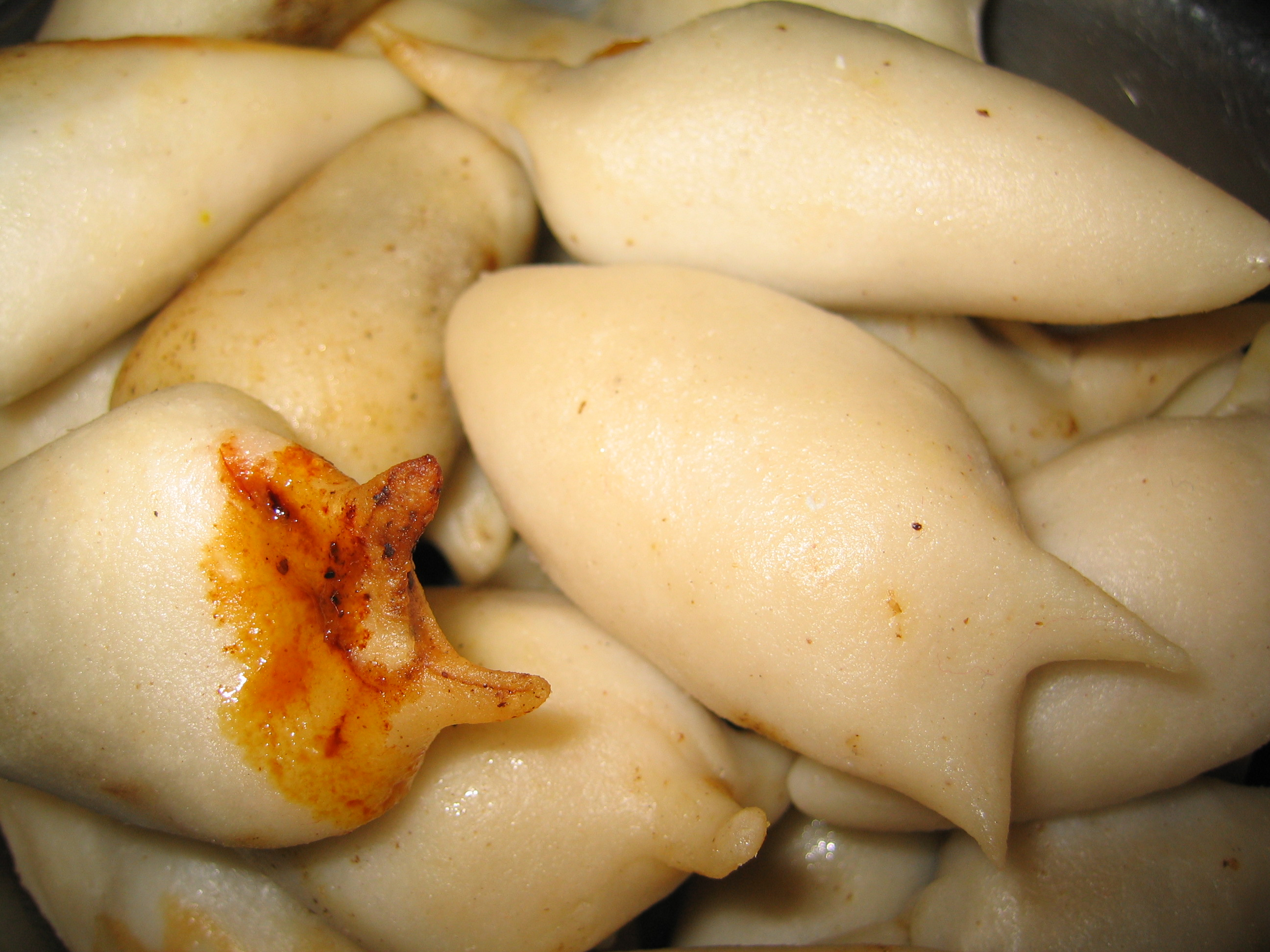
Yomari

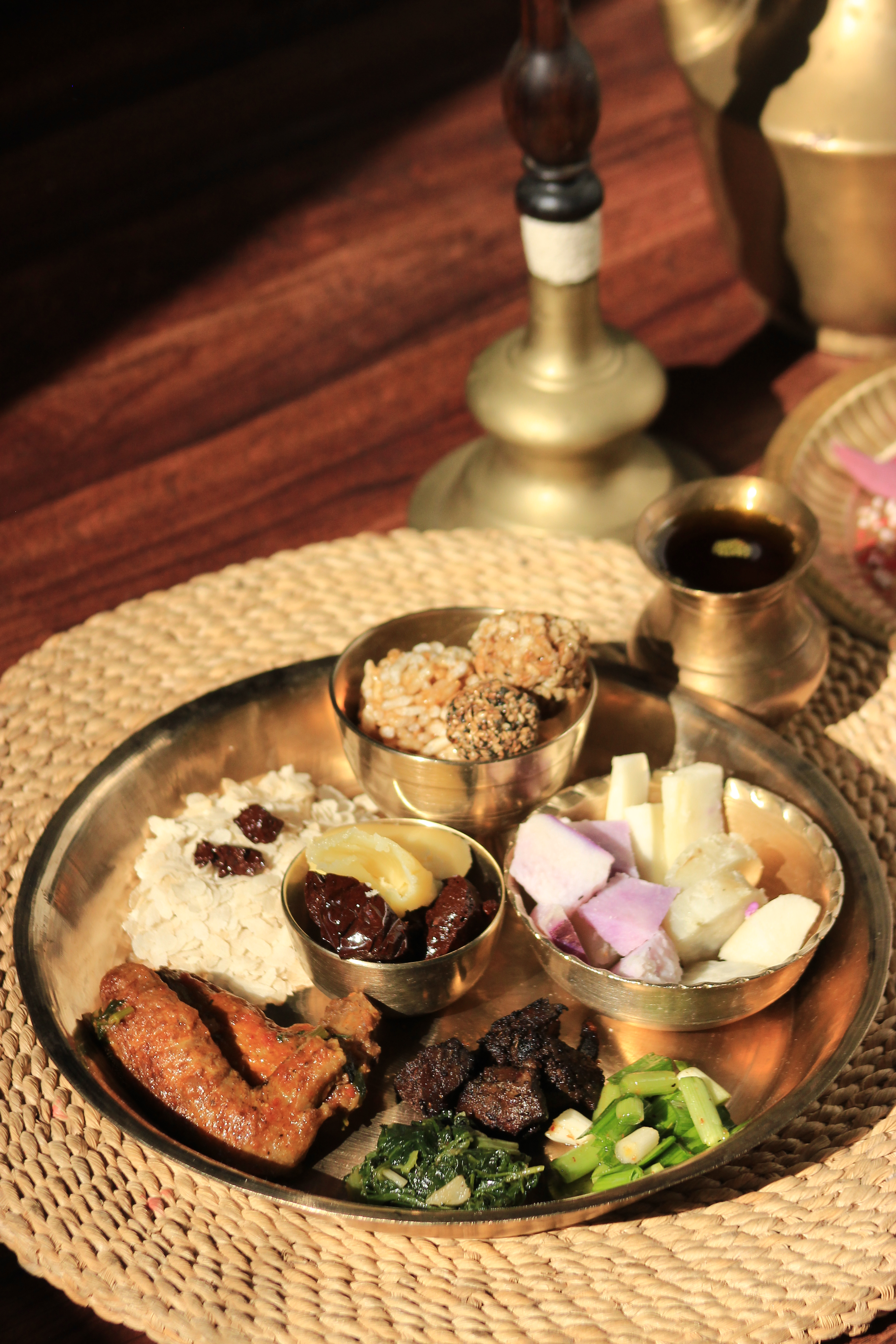
Ghee Chaku

Newars are an urbanized ethnic group originally living in the Kathmandu Valley, but now also in bazaar towns elsewhere in the world and Middle Hills. In the fertile Kathmandu and Pokhara valleys, local market farmers find growing produce more profitable than grain, especially now that cheap rice and other staples can be trucked in. Furthermore, Newar households have relatively high incomes and their culture emphasizes food and feasting.

Although daily Newar food practices consist mostly of components from the generic hill cuisine, during ritual, ceremonial and festive eating, Newar dishes can be much more varied than the generic Pahade/Pahari ones. Newari cuisine widely uses buffalo meat. For vegetarians, meat and dried fish can be replaced by fried tofu or cottage cheese. The cuisine has a wide range of fermented preparations, whereas Pahade/Pahari cuisine has beyond a few aachar condiments.

Kwāti (क्वाति soup of different beans), kachilā (कचिला spiced minced meat), chhoylā (छोयला water buffalo meat marinated in spices and grilled over the flames of dried wheat stalks), pukālā (पुकाला fried meat), wo (व: lentil cake), paun kwā (पाउँक्वा sour soup), swan pukā (स्वँपुका stuffed lungs), syen (स्येँ fried liver), mye (म्ये boiled and fried tongue), sapu mhichā (सःपू म्हिचा leaf tripe stuffed with bone marrow) and sanyā khunā (सन्या खुना jellied fish soup) are some of the popular festival foods.

Dessert consists of dhau (धौ yogurt), sisābusā (सिसाबुसा fruits) and mari (मरि sweets). There are achaars made with aamli fruit. Thwon (थ्वँ rice beer) and aylā (अयला local alcohol) are the common alcoholic liquors that Newars make at home.

Food is of great importance in Newari culture. Newari cuisine is regarded as being delicious food with intense flavorings. There are dishes for every edible part of buffalo meat (cooked and uncooked) that includes intestine, stomach and brain.

=== Rai cuisine ===
During festivals, Rai families prepare meals often featuring pork achaar; chyang, a locally brewed beer; rayo ko saag, a pork and mustard greens dish; dhido, a bread made from millet, maize, or buckwheat flour; kinema, fermented soybeans; vegetable, goat, and mutton curries; sukuti; and beaten rice.

=== Tamang cuisine ===
During Dashain and Tihar, Tamang families prepare meals often featuring slow-cooked pork; khapse, a crispy, twisted fried dough; sel roti; homemade alcohol; and gundruk.

=== Thakali cuisine ===
Thakali food, a transitional cuisine between the Himalayan and lowland culinary traditions, is eaten by Thakali people living in the Thak-Khola Valley. This valley is an ancient and relatively easy trade route through the high Himalaya. This cuisine is also served in inns (bhattis) run by Thakalis alongside other trade routes and in Pokhara and other towns in the hills of central Nepal, that were said to offer the best food and accommodations before the great proliferation of facilities catering to foreign trekkers.

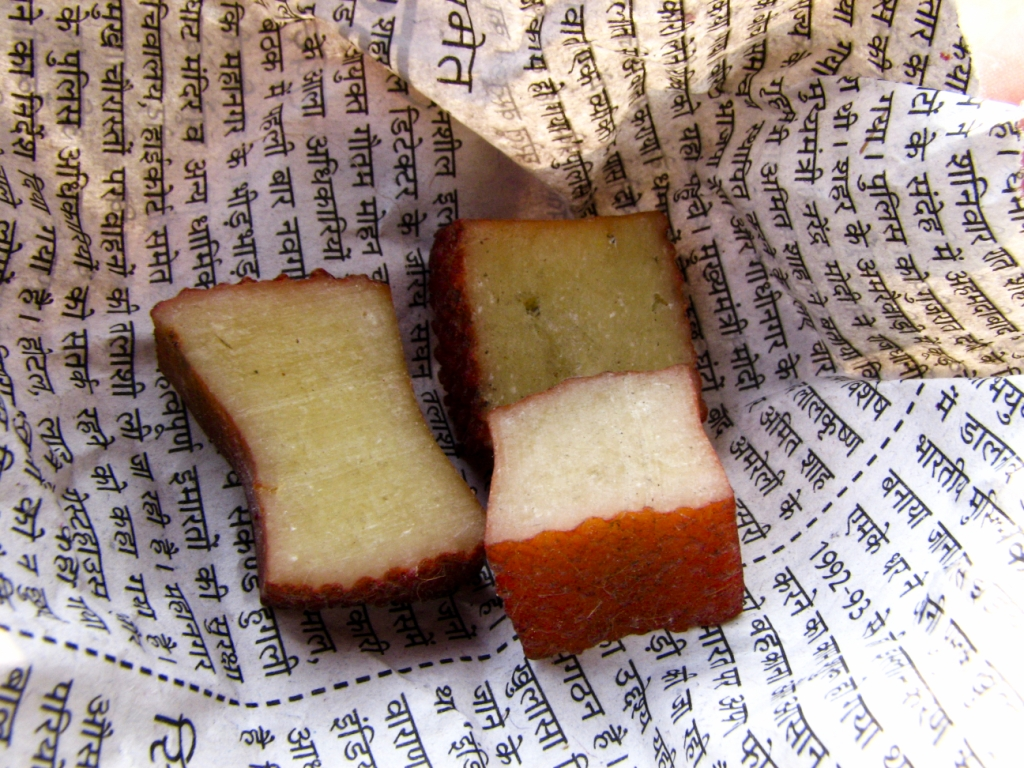
Hard chhurpi cheese made from yak milk

Very few Thakali own their own yaks, so butter made from the yak milk is usually purchased at the market, along with other staples like rice, tea, lentils, sugar and spices. After butter is produced, a hard cheese called chhurpi is made with the buttermilk.

Thakali cuisine is less vegetarian than Pahari cuisine. Yak and yak-cow hybrids locally known as Jhopa were consumed by the lower castes. All castes eat the meat of local sheep called Bheda and Chyangra or Chiru imported from Tibet. Meat is sliced into thin slices and dried on thin poles near the cooking fire. Blood sausage is also prepared and dried. Dried meat is added to vegetable curries or sauteed in ghee and dipped into timur-ko-choup which is a mixture of red chili powder, Sichuan pepper, salt and local herbs. This spice mixture also seasons new potatoes, or eggs which may be boiled, fried or made into omelets.

Thakali cuisine uses locally grown buckwheat, barley, millet and dal, as well as rice, maize and dal imported from lower regions to the south. Grain may be ground and boiled into a thick porridge that is eaten in place of rice with dal. A kind of dal is even made from dried, ground buckwheat leaves. Grain can be roasted or popped in hot sand (which is then sieved off) as a snack food. Thakalis also follow the Tibetan customs of preparing tsampa and tea with butter and salt. Ghee is used in this tea preparation and as a cooking oil otherwise.

Since most Thakali people were engaged in trade, they could import vegetables, fruits and eggs from lower regions. A large variety of vegetables were consumed daily, some—especially daikon radish and beetroot—dried and often prepared with mutton. Soup prepared from spinach known as gyang-to was served with a pinch of timur-ko-choup. Apples were introduced following the arrival of foreign horticulturists and are now widely enjoyed.

=== Tharu cuisine ===
Nepal has seven low elevation Inner Terai valleys enclosed by the Sivalik and Mahabharat ranges. Historically these valleys were extremely malarial and populated mainly by the Tharu who had genetic resistance. Since the valleys were isolated from one another, Tharu enclaves spoke different dialects and had different customs. They may have had different cuisines, although this has not been very well studied. Nevertheless, most Tharu historically obtained a varied diet through hunting and gathering as well as shifting agriculture and animal husbandry.

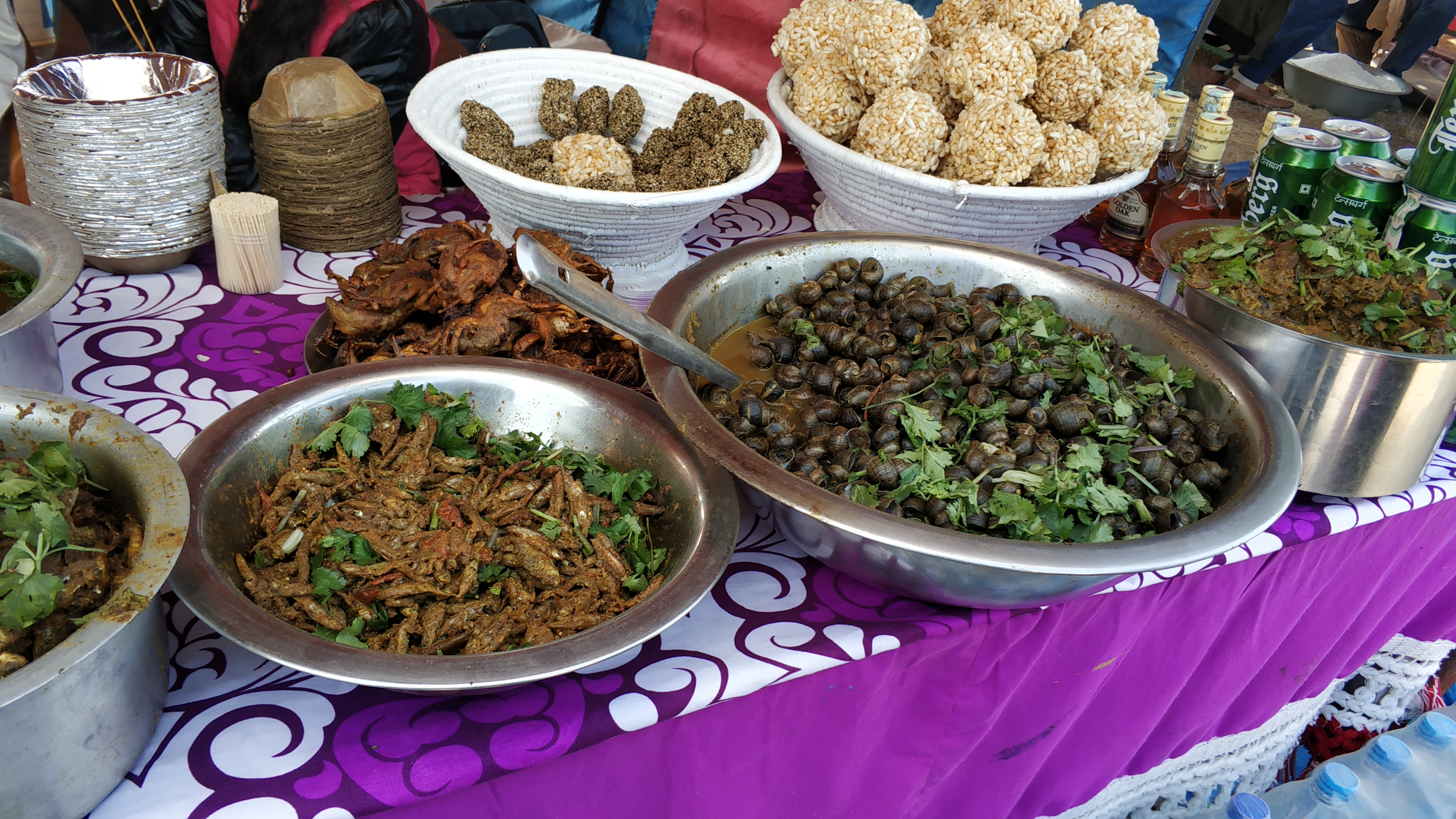
Tharu food

This contrasted with diets of Pahade/Pahari Hindus that were predominantly agricultural and used only a few sources of animal protein because of religious or caste prohibitions. In the 1950s, when Nepal opened its borders to foreigners and foreign aid missions, malaria suppression programs in the Inner Madhesh made it possible for people without genetic resistance to survive there. The Tharu faced an influx of people fleeing land and food deficits in the hills. Conversion of forest and grassland to cropland and prohibitions on hunting shifted the Tharu in the east and west away from land-based hunting and gathering, toward greater use of fish, freshwater crab, prawns and snails from rivers and ponds.

Tharu raise chickens and are reported to employ dogs to hunt rats in rice paddies and then roast them whole on sticks. Mutton may be obtained from nomadic hill people such as Kham Magar who take herds of sheep and goats up to sub-alpine pastures bordering the high Himalaya in summer, and down to Inner Madhesh valleys in winter. Increasing competition for land forces the Tharu people away from shifting cultivation toward sedentary agriculture, so the national custom of eating rice with lentils gains headway. The Tharu have unique ways of preparing these staples, such as rice and lentil dumplings called bagiya or dhikri and immature rice is used to make a kind of gruel, maar.

Taro root is an important crop in the region. The leaves and roots are eaten. Sidhara is a mixture of taro root, dried fish and turmeric that is formed into cakes and dried for preservation. The cakes are broken up and cooked with radish, chili, garlic and other spices to accompany boiled rice. Snails are cleansed, boiled and spiced to make ghonghi. Other Tharu recipes include roasted crab, wheat flatbread fried in mustard oil, and fried taro leaf cakes. Tharu recipes eaten during Dashain and Tihar include andik bhaat, a sticky rice; telpaur roti, a fried bread; sidhraak chutney, a dried baby fish dish; and bhakka, a fluffy rice cake.

=== Tibetan-influenced cuisine ===
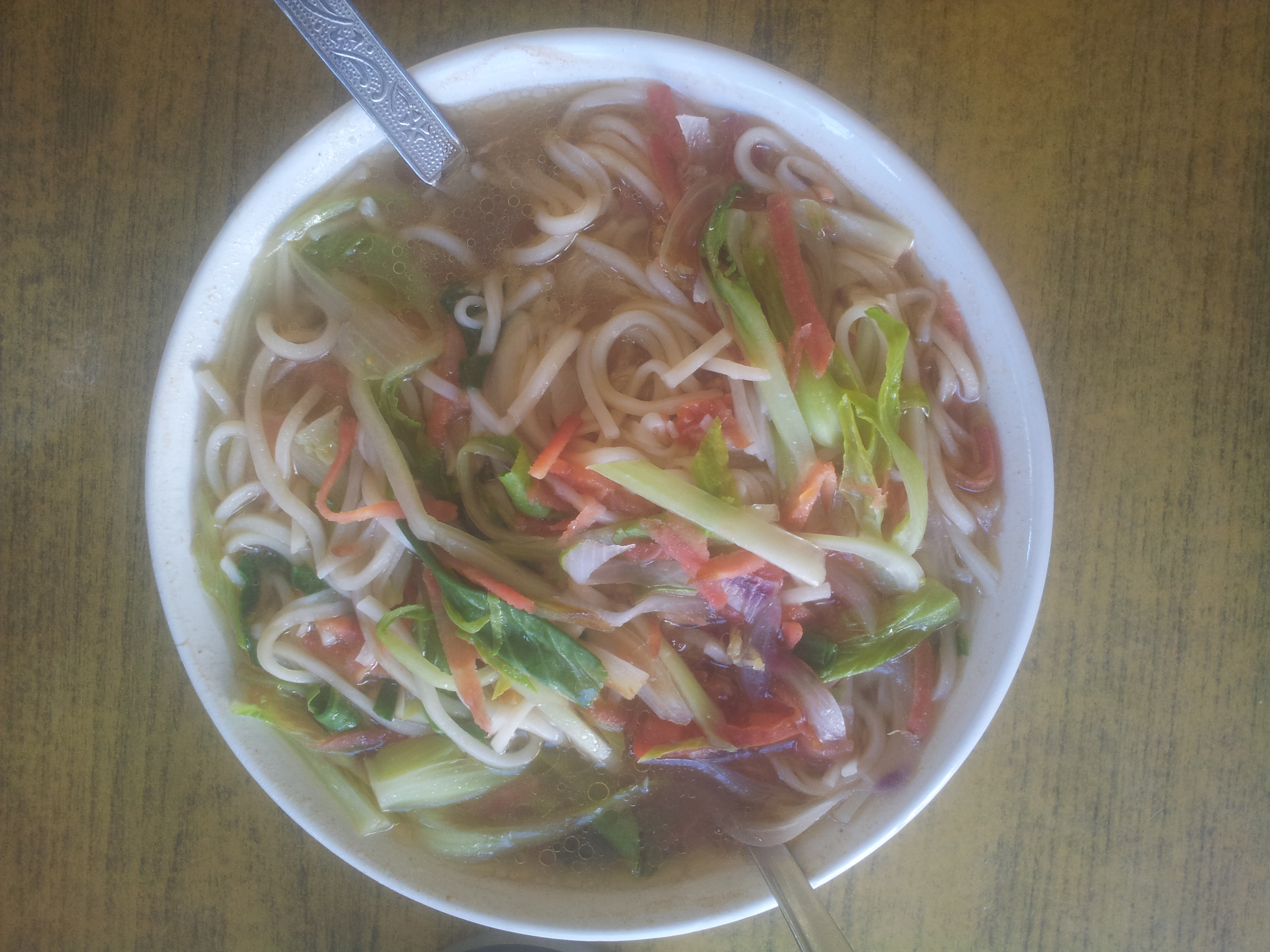
Tibetan thukpa

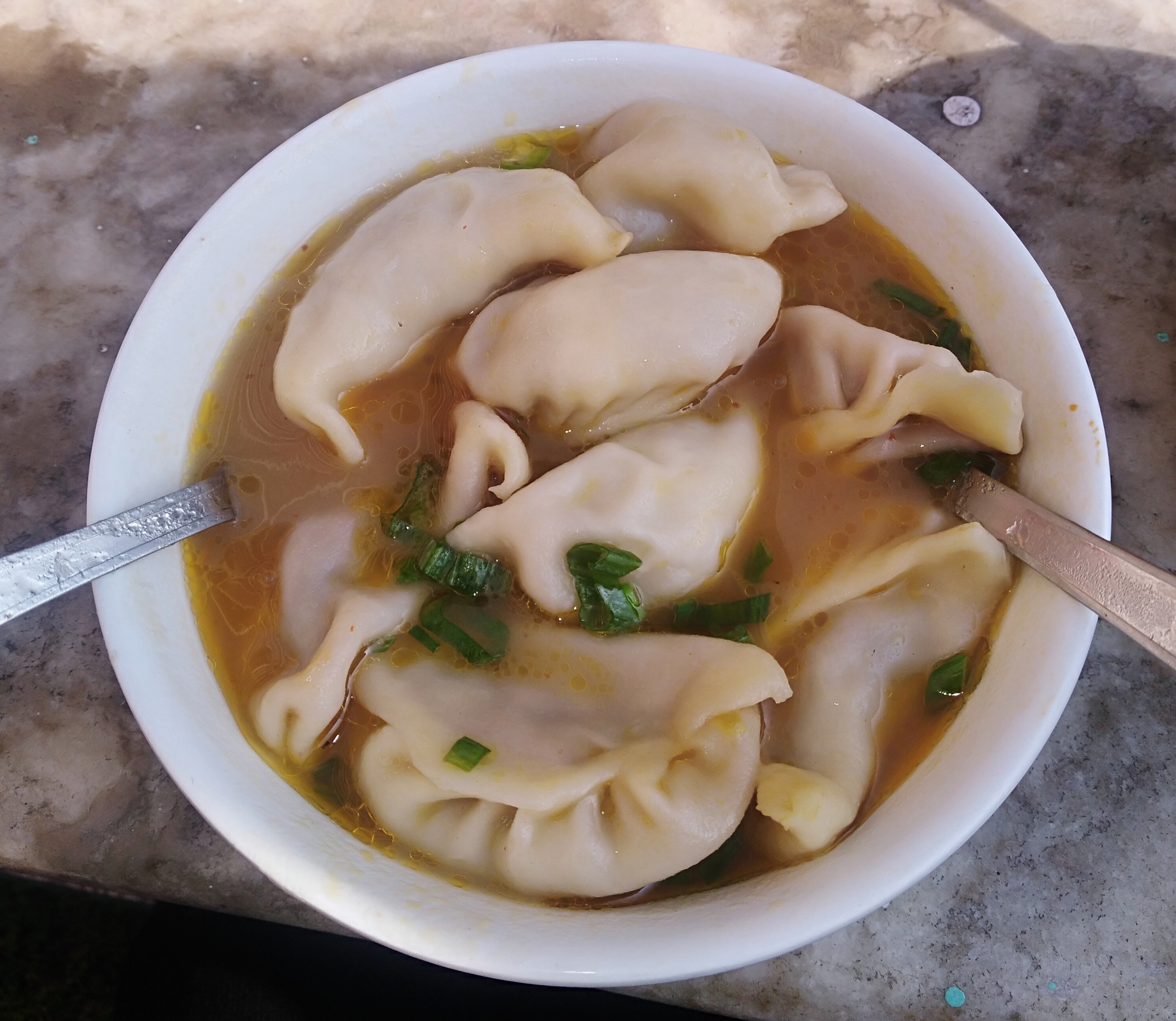
Jhol momo

Himalayan cuisine is influenced culturally by Tibetan and closely related ethnic groups in the Himalaya and Trans-Himalaya. The Himalayan region is not fertile as compared to other regions. Moreover, the climate is cold throughout the year with heavy snowfalls. The food crops grown in this region are buckwheat, millet, naked barley, common beans, and high-altitude rice. Potatoes are another important staple crop and food. Substantial amounts of rice are imported from the lowlands.

Because of the cold temperature, people often prefer warm foods like soup, thukpa, tea and strong alcohols. Grains are made into alcoholic beverages (see below). Butter tea is made by mixing butter or ghyu (घ्यु)/ghee and salt into a strong brew of tea. This tea preparation is also commonly mixed with tsampa flour to make a kind of fast food, which is especially eaten while traveling.

The cattle raised in this region are yak, chauries (yak and cow crossed), Himalayan goats, and sheep. People raise these animals for meat, milk, cheese, and dahi (yogurt).

Most of the Himalayan regions are hard to reach. There is no proper means of transportation because of higher altitudes and it is a considerable challenge to build good road transportation. Hence only rice and some condiments such as salt are imported from other regions by air transport or by using animals as their means of transportation.

People in this region eat dhido (millet or barley cooked dough), potato curry, momo (dumplings), Jhol Momo, Mokthuk, yak or goat or sheep meat, milk, thukpa, laping or strong alcohol like tongba (millet juice) for their regular diet. This region also imports rice from other regions. Daal-bhat-tarkari is a staple in the cuisine served to the Everest-bound tourists.

== Gallery ==
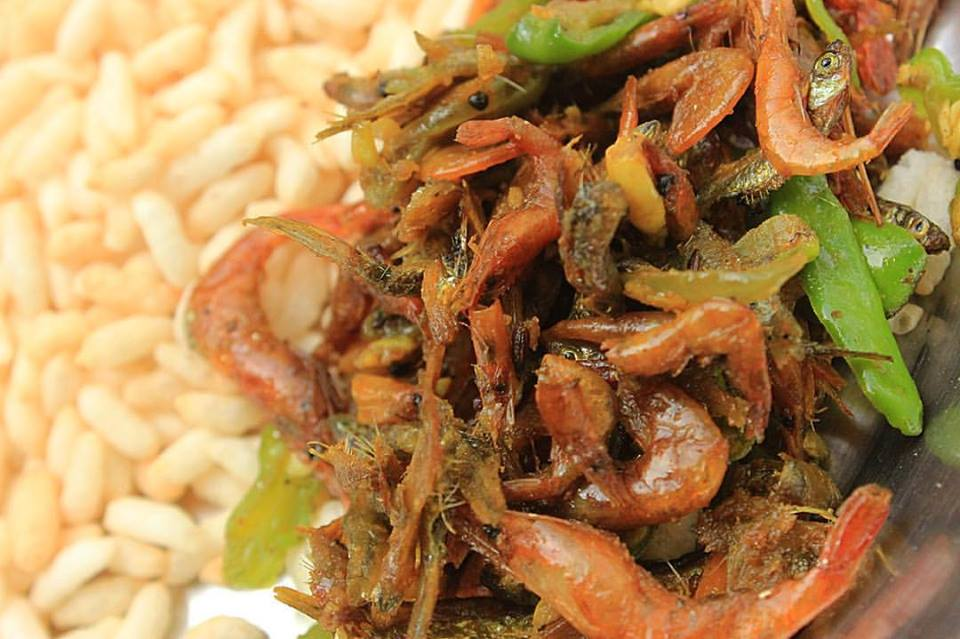
Dried fish dish; Tharu cuisine

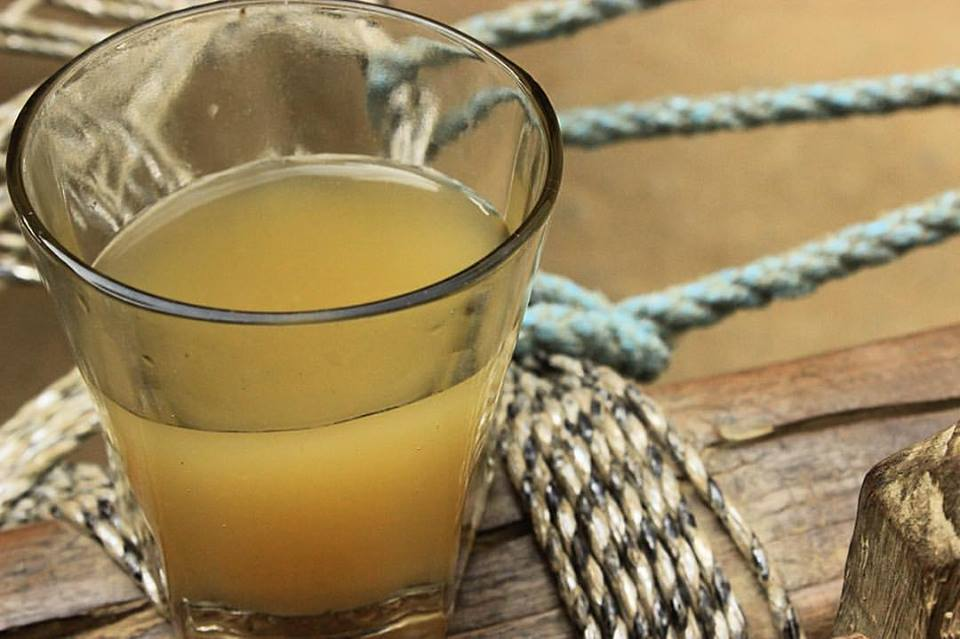
Rice wine; Tharu cuisine

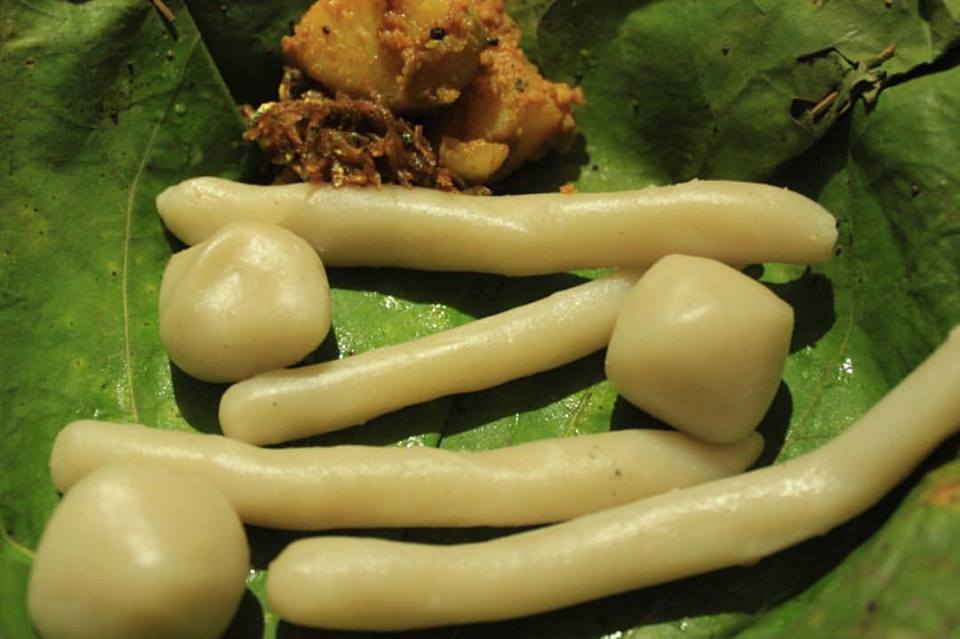
Dhikari; Tharu cuisine

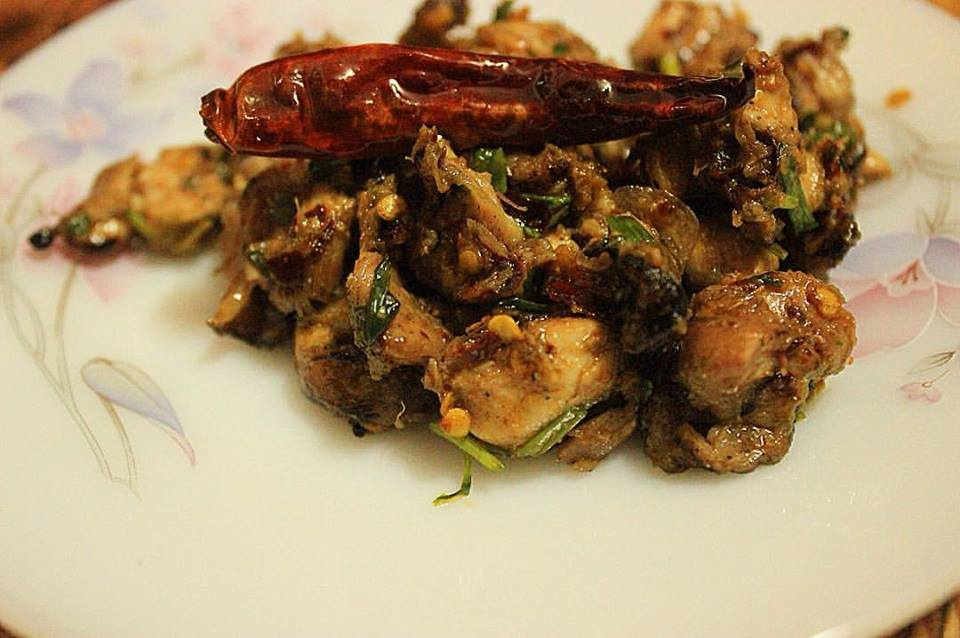
Chhwela; Newa cuisine

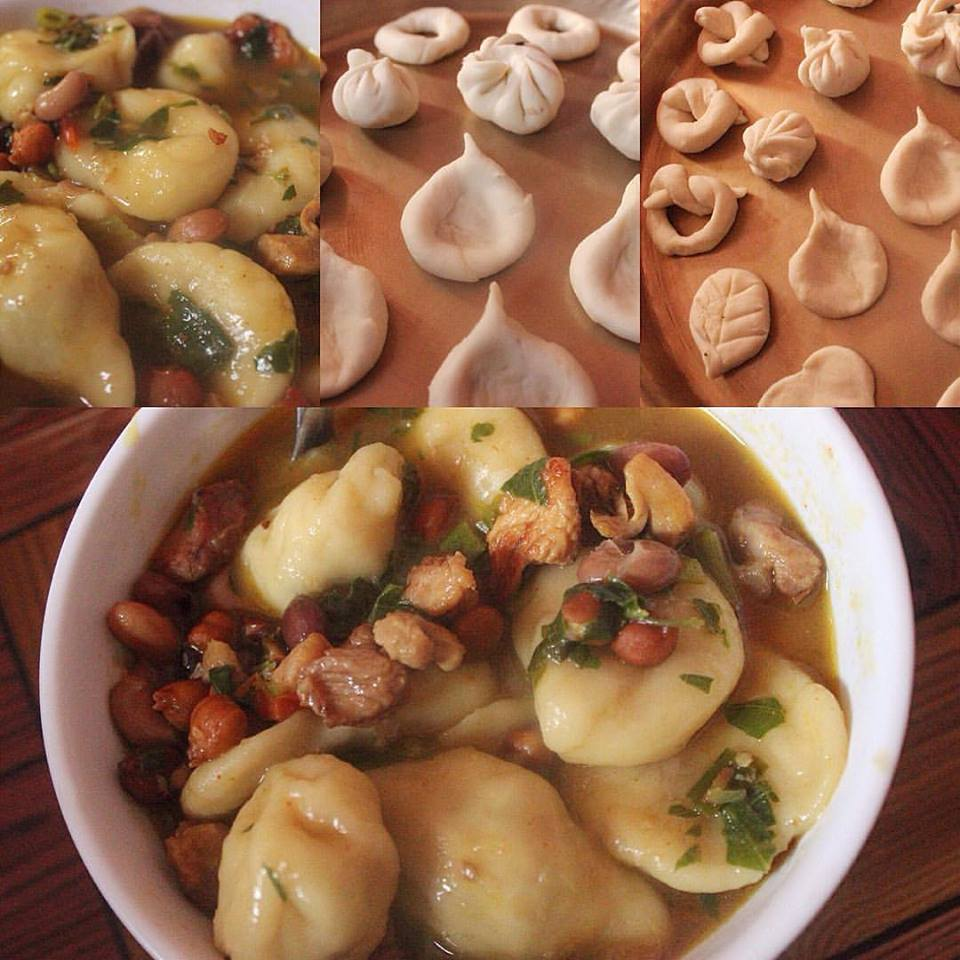
Gwarcha; Newa cuisine

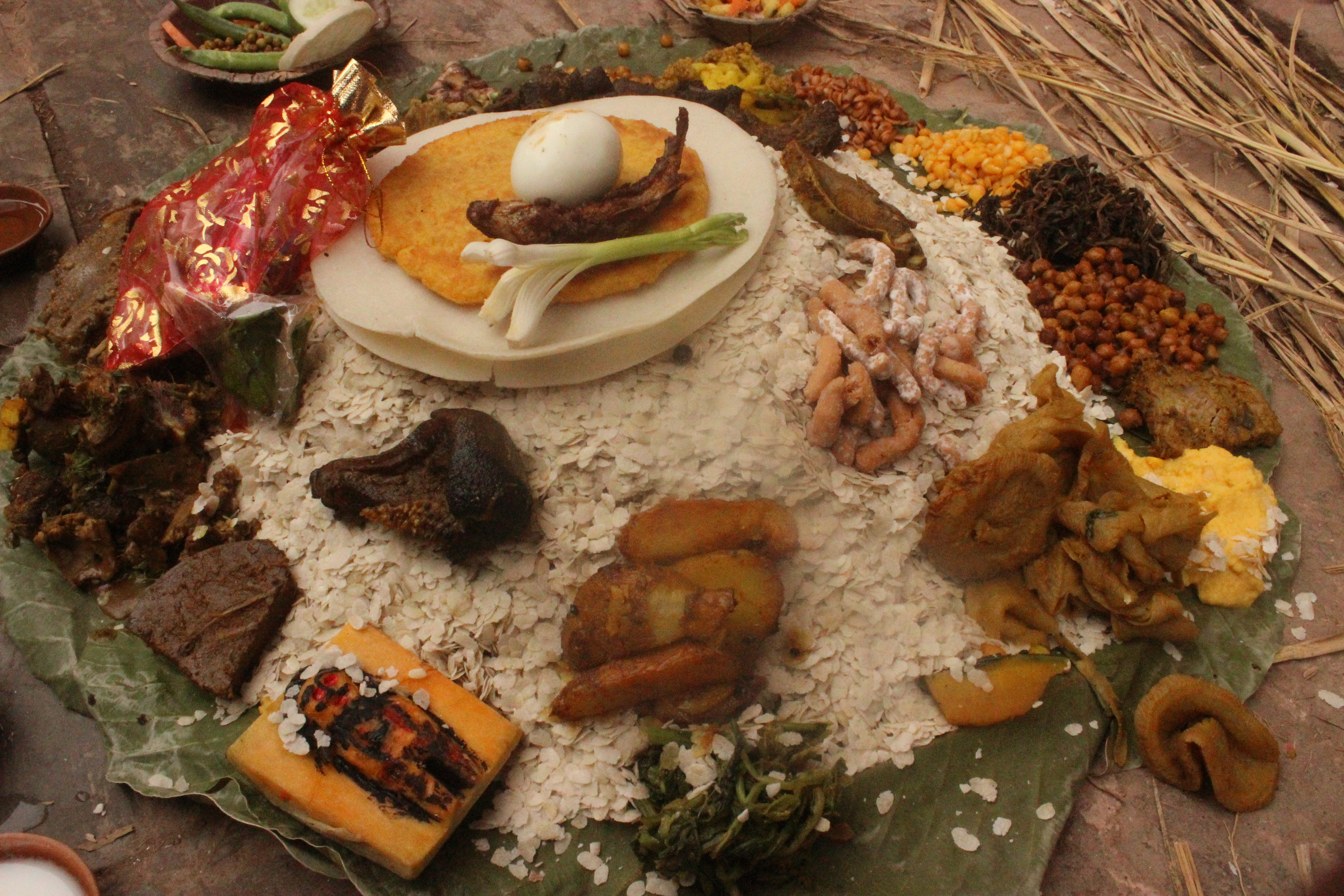
Lapte bhoye; Newa cuisine

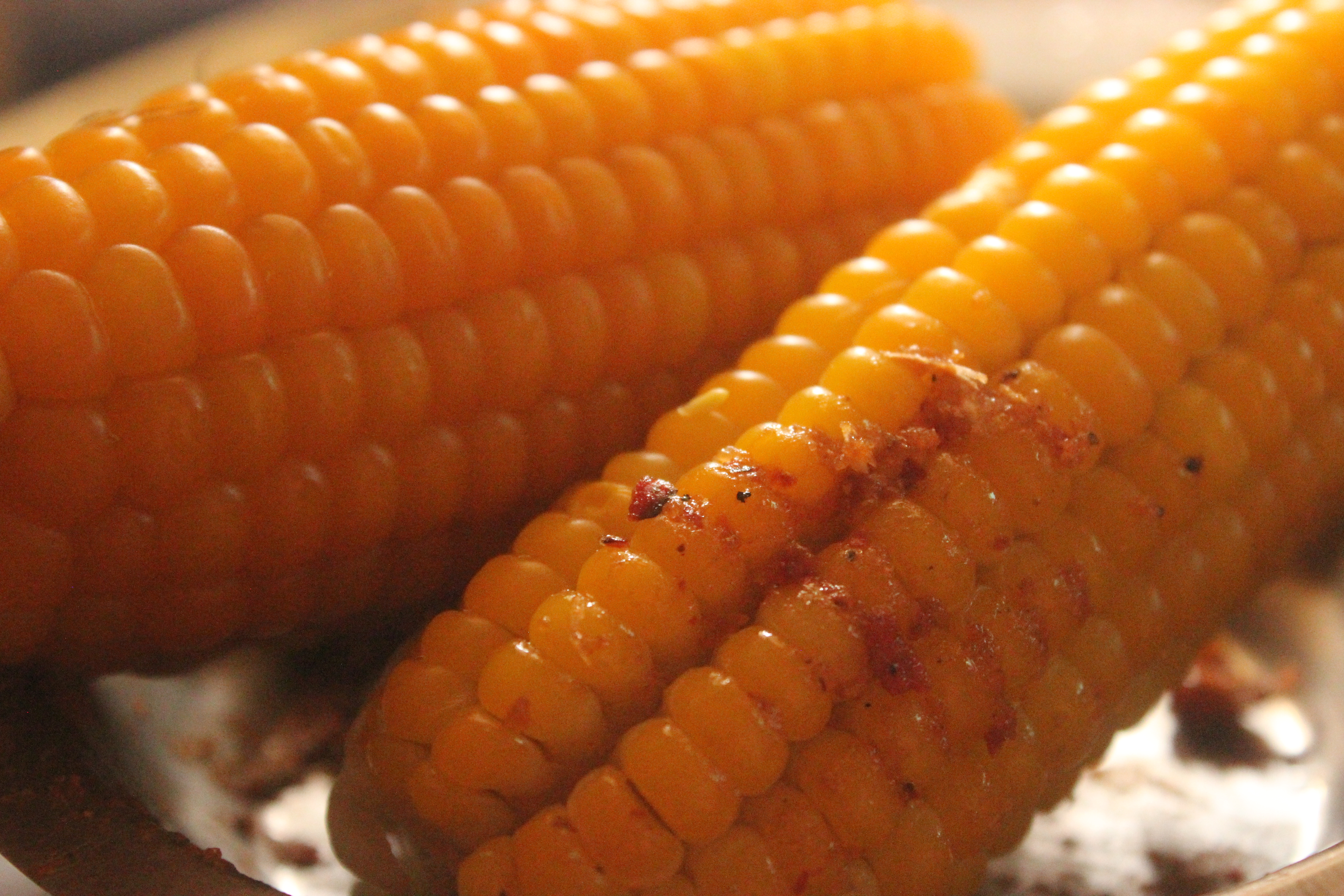
Boiled corn with chilli pickle

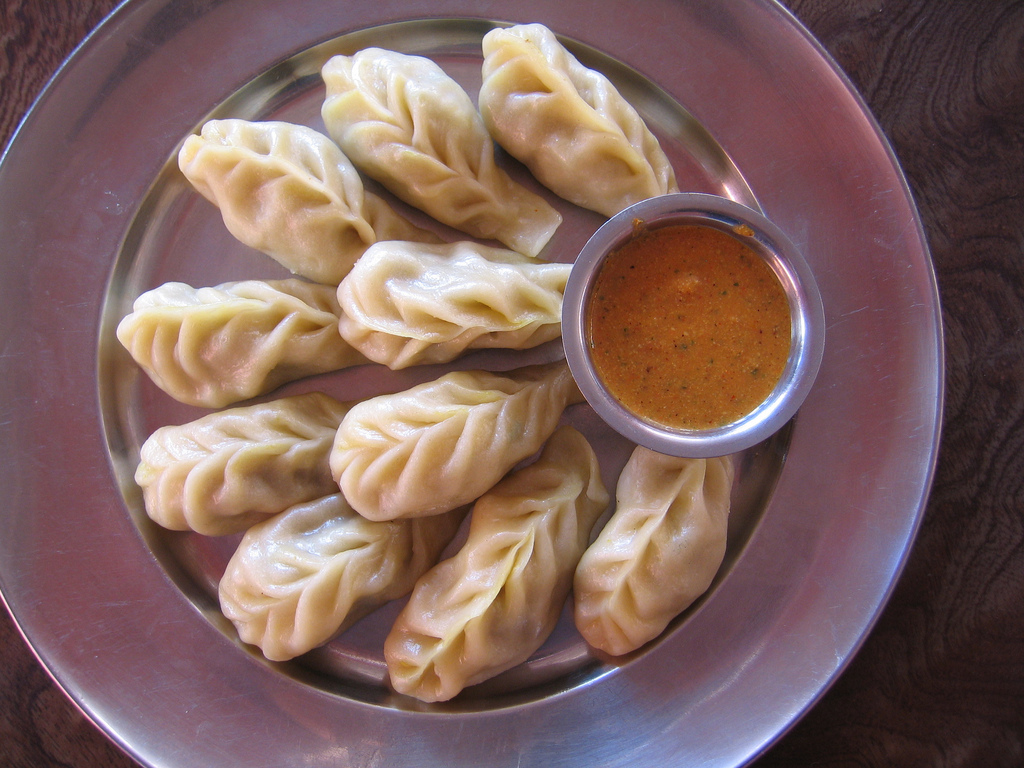
Plateful of momo in Nepal

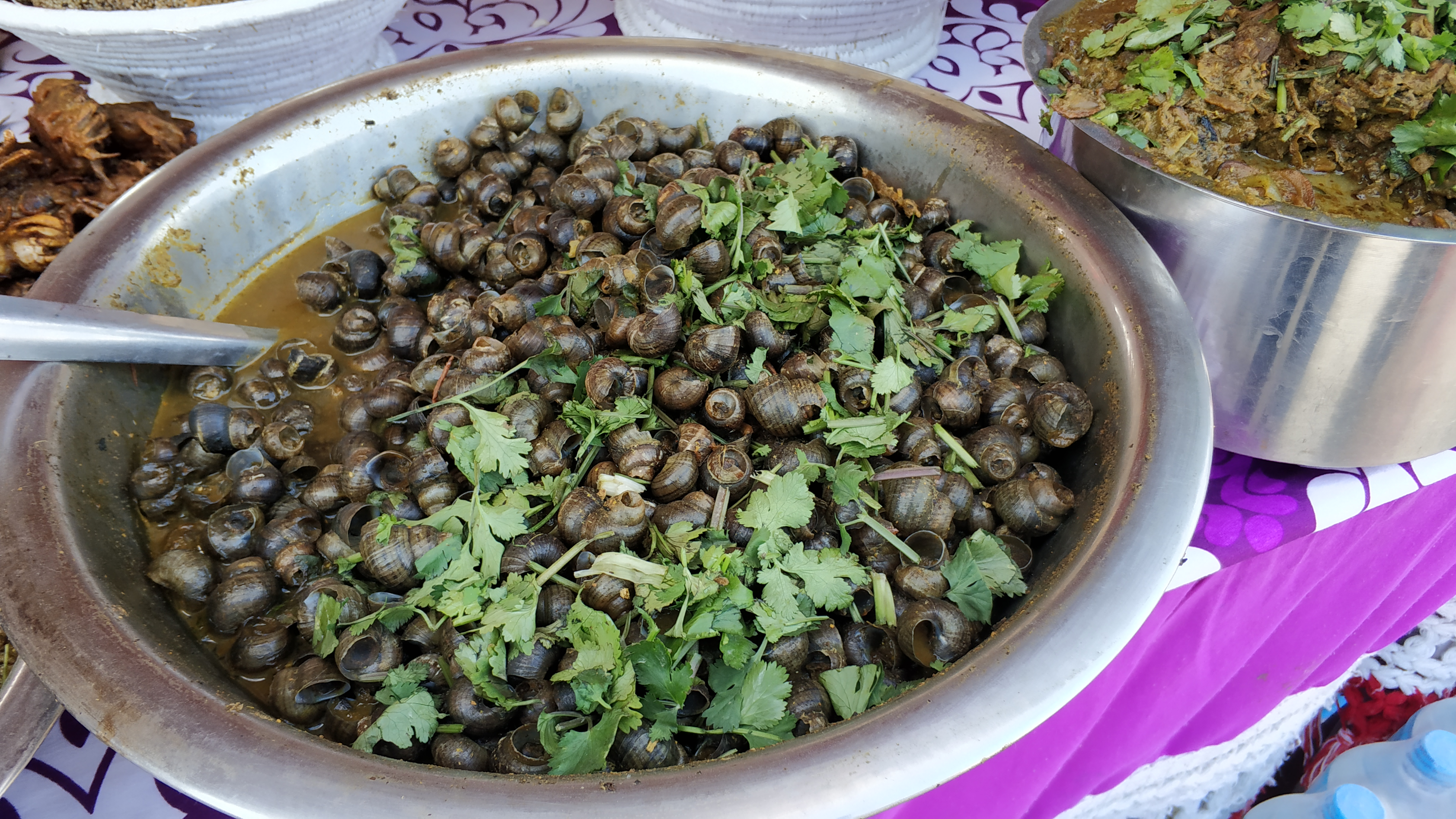
Ghonghi; Tharu cuisine

== See also ==
- Culture of Nepal
- Indian cuisine
- Newari cuisine
- Chaat
- List of Nepalese dishes
- South Asian cuisine
- Jimbu
