= Sel roti =

Nepalese sweet rice bread

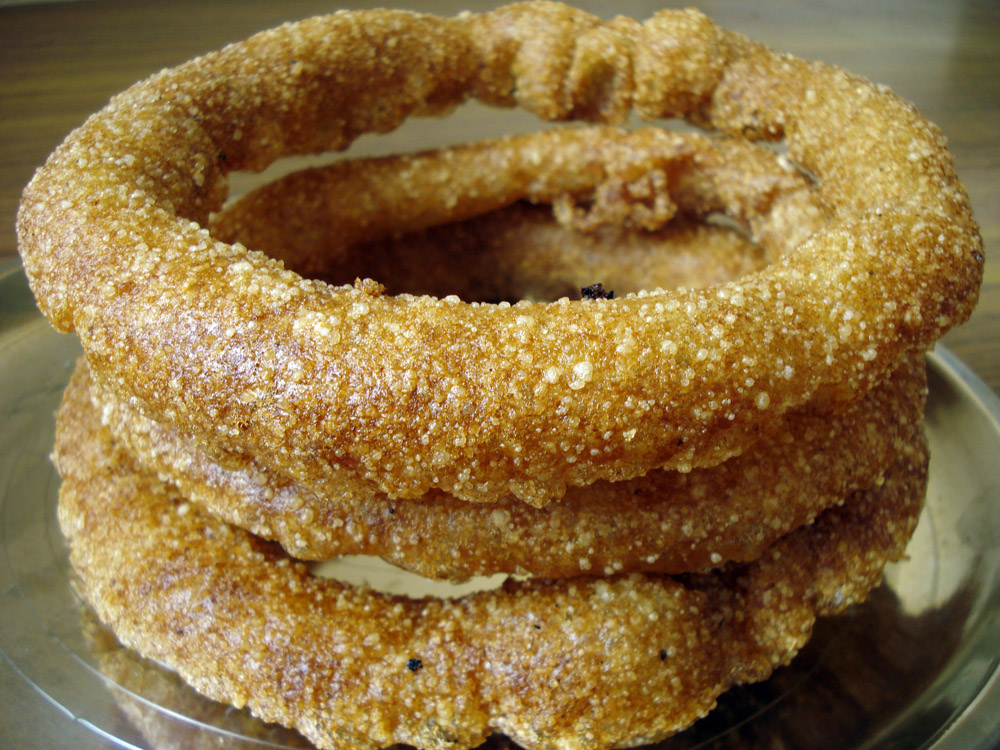
- Type: Fried dough
- Course: Breakfast, lunch, dinner, snack
- Place of origin: Nepal
- Associated cuisine: Nepalese cuisine
- Main ingredients: Rice flour, sugar, ghee
- Ingredients generally used: Cardamom, clove
- Variations: Singhal (Kumaon)

Sel roti (Nepali: सेल रोटी) is a traditional Nepalese ring-shaped sweet fried dough made from rice flour. It is mostly prepared during Dashain and Tihar, widely celebrated Hindu festivals in Nepal as well as Darjeeling, Kalimpong and Sikkim and the Kumaon region of Uttarakhand. The dish is popular throughout Nepal. Sel roti is made from a batter of rice flour, water, sugar, ghee, and spices which is then deep-fried in cooking oil.

== Origin and etymology ==
Dinesh Raj Panta, a professor at Nepal Sanskrit University, estimates this dish to be over 800 years old. According to Madhulika Dash, an Indian food columnist, the dish was made bland many years ago, without sugar and spices. Over the years with intermingling of various ethnicities of Nepal, the dish has reached in its modern form. Dash also estimates that sel roti may have been a modified form of Blbabari, a Nepalese rice pancake. Babari is made of the same batter but is cooked like a pancake on a shallow griddle while sel roti is ring-shaped and deep-fried on a karahi.

The name of the dish is assumed to be derived from sel, a variety of rice that grows in the foothills of Nepal. Roti in Nepali translates to 'bread'. Another theory also suggests that the name of the dish is from saal, the Nepali word for 'year'. Since the dish was developed to be a ceremonial dish made on the Nepalese new year, it may have been called saal roti, which later had become sel roti.

== Preparation and ingredients ==
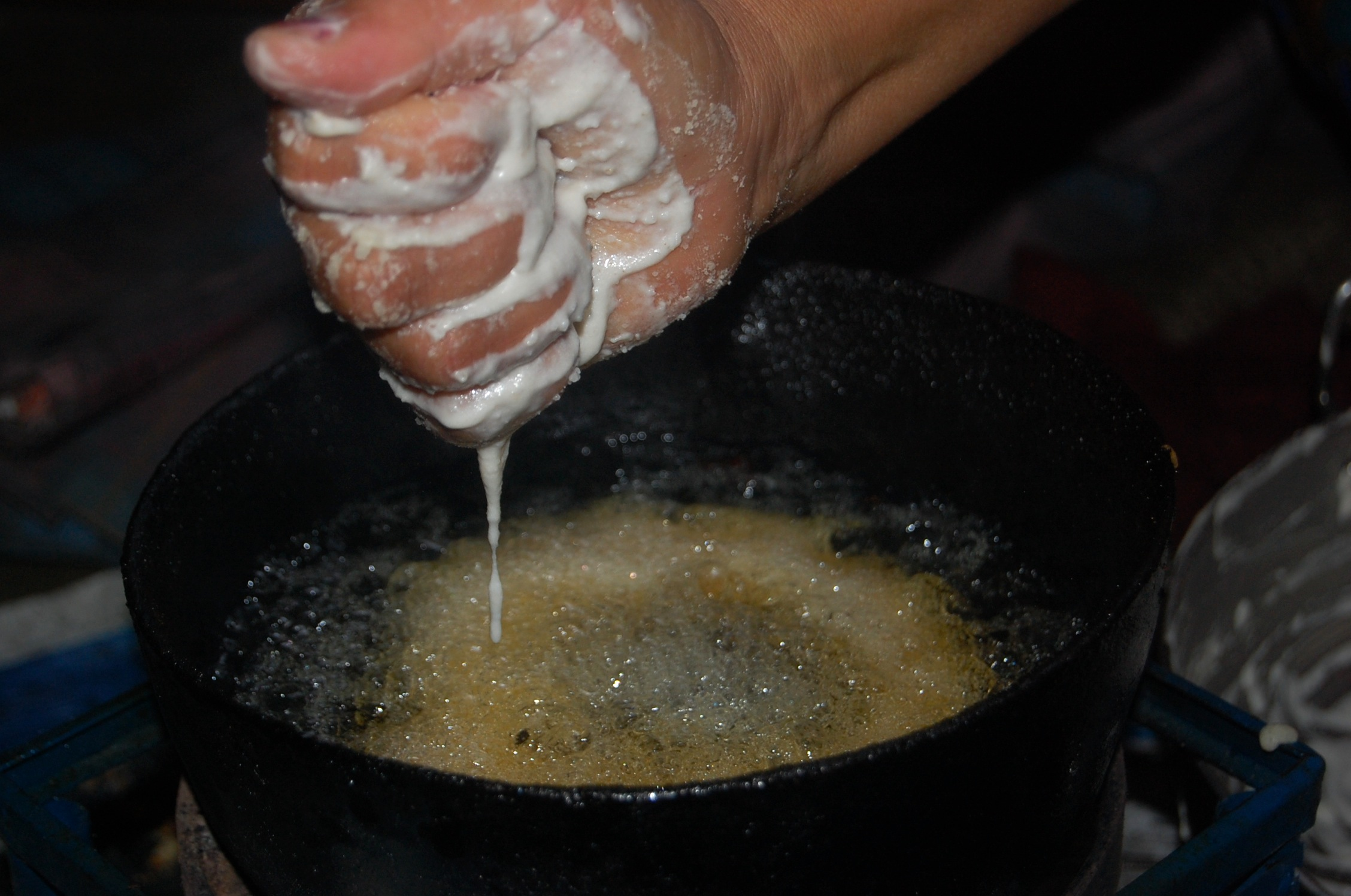
The batter poured into hot oil

It is made of rice flour with added flavours. A batter is prepared by adding water, sugar, and ghee to roughly ground rice flour. The ghee can also be substituted by cooking oil or butter. Spices such as cardamom and clove may be added to the batter. The ingredients are then allowed to rest for a few hours. Studies show that letting the batter sit for about six hours at around 30 °C makes sel roti taste better and more cost-effective to prepare. During this time, natural bacteria and yeast ferment the batter and make it more acidic. This extra acidity helps the sel roti soak up less oil during frying, so it turns out less greasy, more flavorful, and more economical. Once the batter is set, it is deep-fried in cooking oil or ghee. Instead of water, milk can also be used to prepare the batter. However, using milk can reduce the shelf life of the dish. When stored properly (for example, in a dry, airtight container), sel roti can remain edible for about two weeks at room temperature.

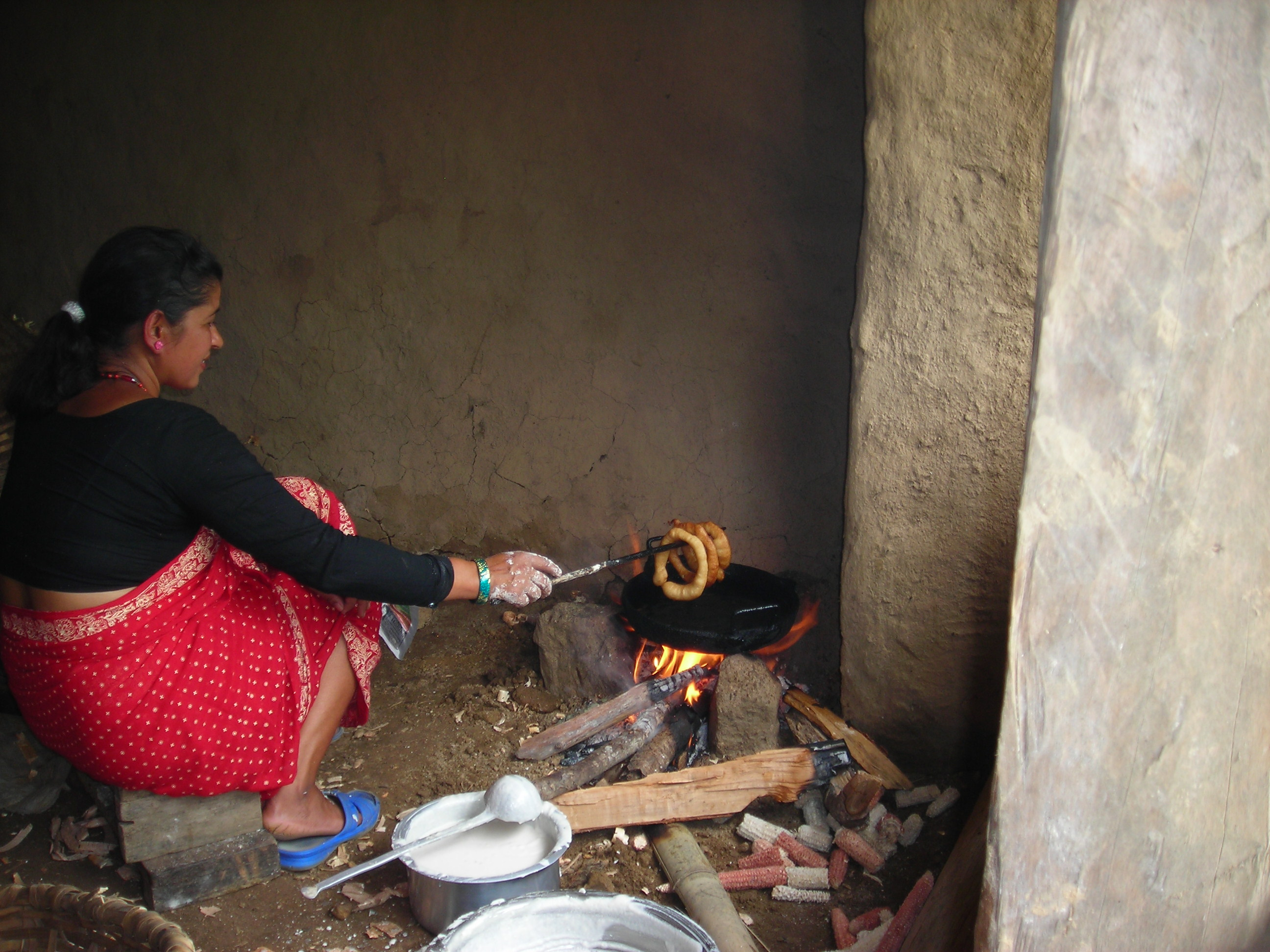
A woman cooking sel roti in a traditional Nepalese wooden stove

The dough is poured by hand in a ring shape into boiling oil and cooked on medium heat (around 348 °F to 373 °F) until it turns light brown on both sides. Two metallic or wooden sticks (known as jhir in Nepali language), each about 1 foot (30 cm) long, are used for turning the dough while cooking.

Sel roti are cooked in bulk and can be stored at room temperature for least 20 days. Sel roti are often sent as special gifts to family members living away from home or used as prasada, a religious offering. Sel roti is also featured in contemporary publications that share simple, easy-to-follow recipes, highlighting it as a basic sweet snack.

== Frying medium ==
The type of oil used to fry sel roti affects its quality. A 2017 study found that ghee led to the highest fat absorption, while refined soybean oil was the best overall choice for physical and chemical quality. Ghee gave the best taste, but soybean and sunflower oils are cheaper and easier to find, and soybean oil is healthier because it has essential fatty acids.

== Occasions and variations ==
Sel roti is a special-occasion dish made mainly for the Nepali celebration of the Dashain and Tihar festivals. It is unique to Nepal and is made and served throughout the country during festivals as well as wedding parties and other ceremonies.

It is also a traditional food in Nepali-speaking communities in Darjeeling, Sikkim, Siliguri and Kalimpong regions of India and southern Bhutan. It is an essential food at most Nepalese and Kumaoni cultural and traditional events. Instead of the traditional single-ring shape, sel roti is made in a double-ring shape in the Sikkim, Darjeeling and Kalimpong areas.

Singhal, a dish from the Kumaon region in the Uttarakhand state of India, is similar to sel roti, but while sel roti is made from rice flour, singhal is prepared from semolina flour.

== Nutritional value ==
Traditional sel roti is a very rich dish, primarily because it is made from rice flour and sugar and then deep-fried. This preparation process results in a high calorie content, fat (around 27% crude fat), and carbohydrates (about 66%), providing roughly 534 kcal per 100 g, but the dish is notably low in protein, fiber, and essential minerals like iron and calcium. To improve its nutritional quality, a 2021 study demonstrated that substituting 10% of the rice flour with roasted soy flour significantly boosted the levels of protein, fiber, iron, and calcium. Importantly, participants who tasted this modified sel roti actually preferred it, giving it better scores for its appearance, flavor, texture, and overall acceptance compared to the standard recipe.

== Gallery ==
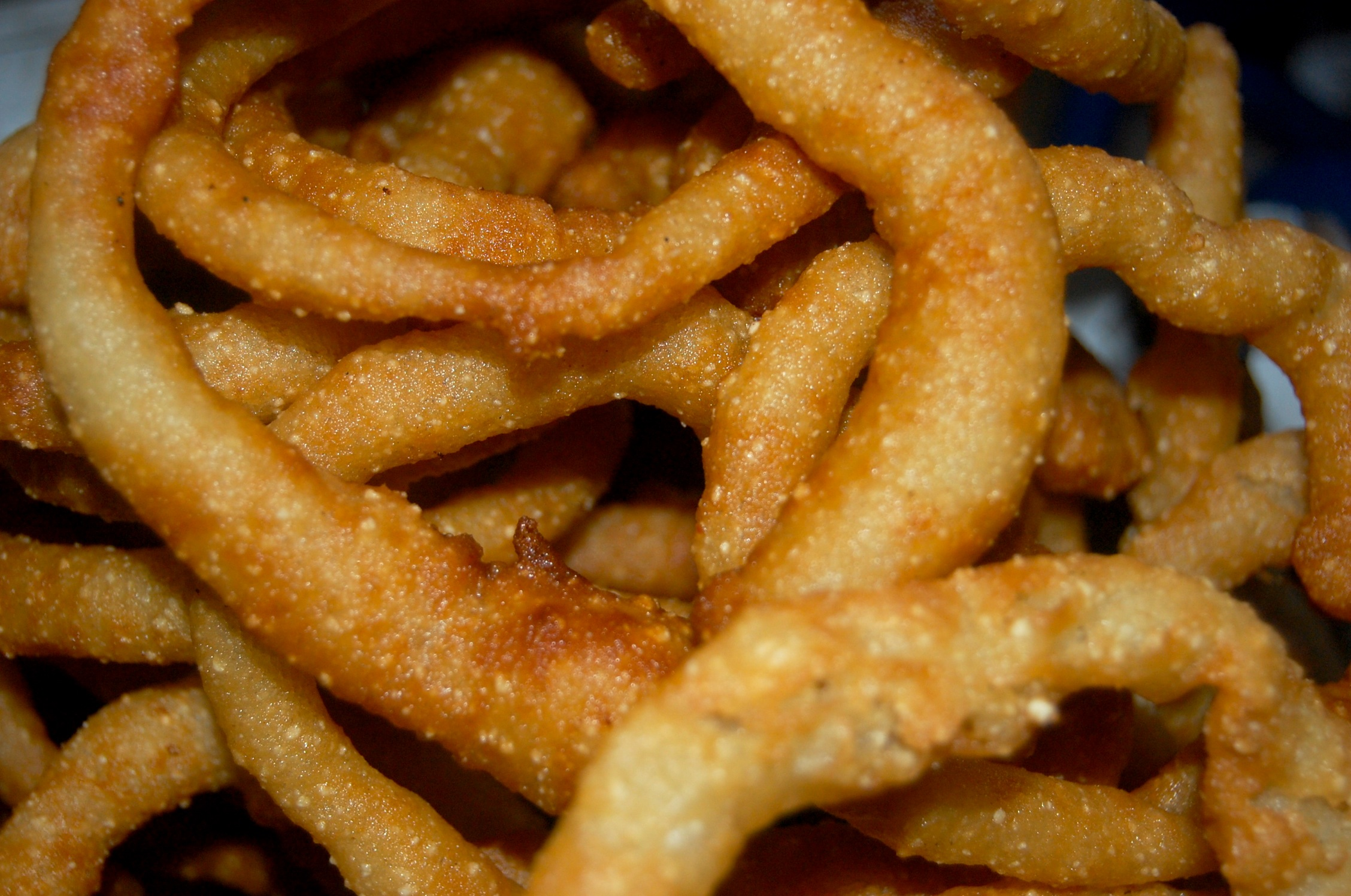
Sel roti

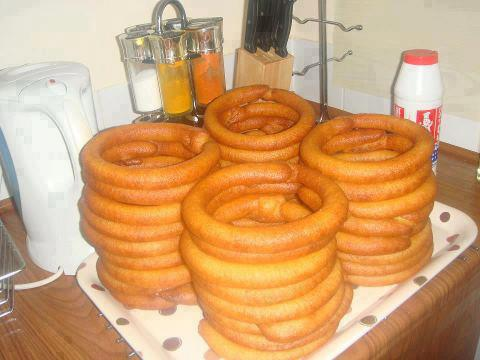
Stacks of cooked sel roti

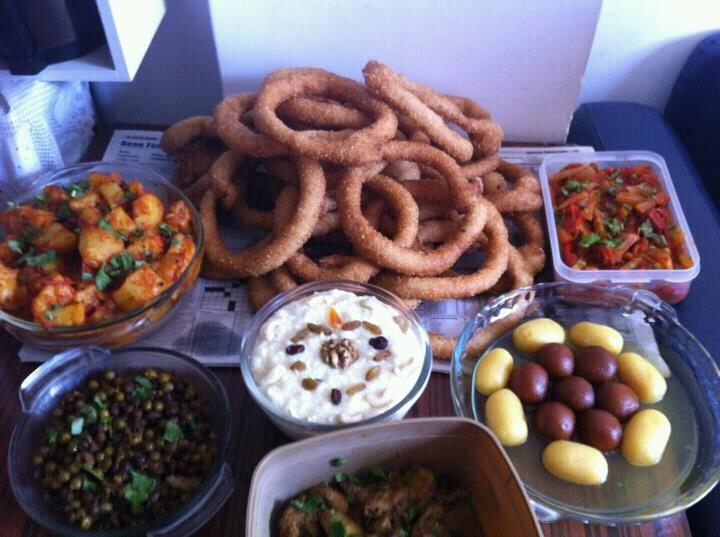
Sel roti with various Nepalese curries and sweets

== See also ==
- List of doughnut varieties
- List of fried dough varieties
