= Leaf plate =

Plates which are made of leaves

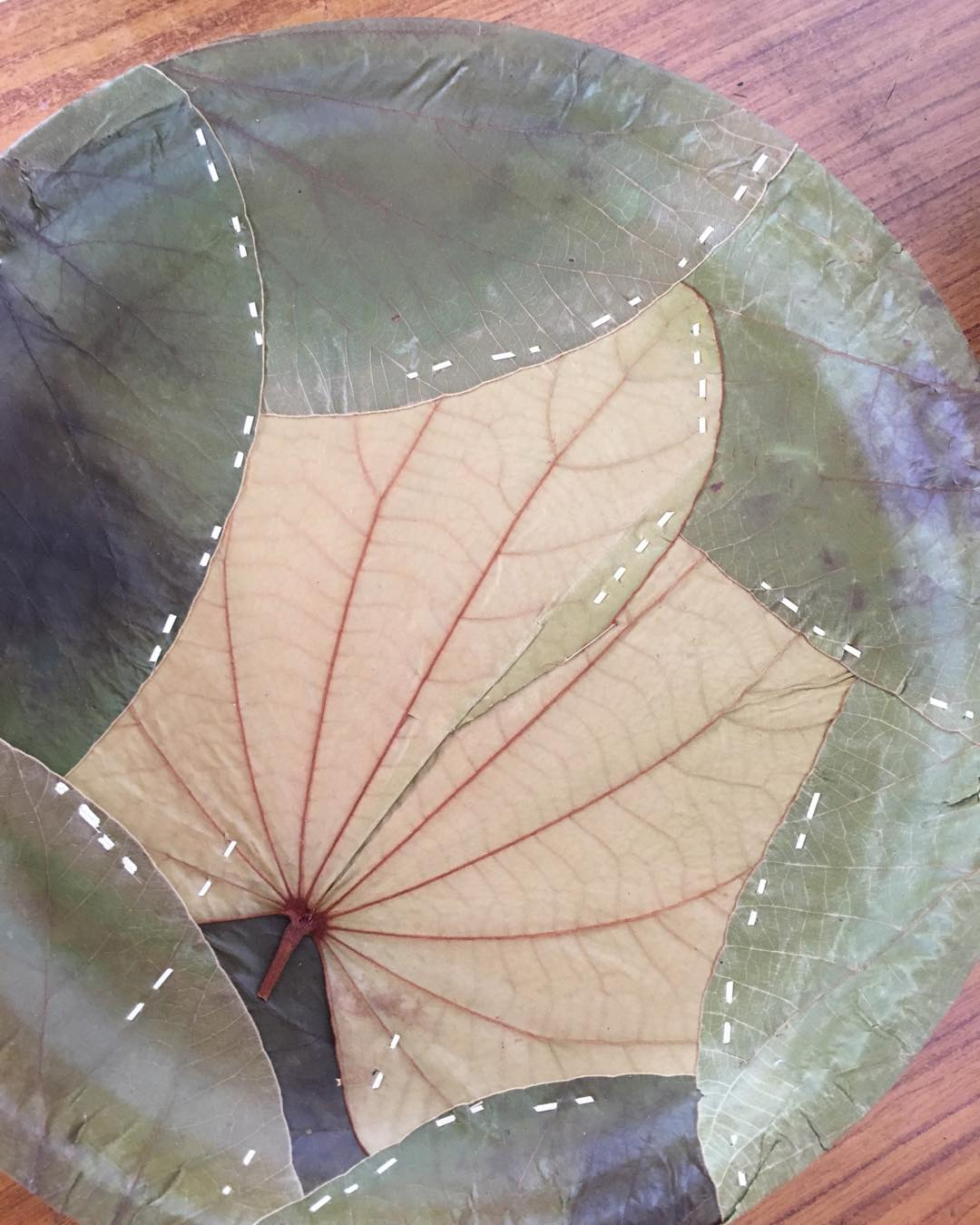
Dried pattal made from leaves of genus Bauhinia variegata.

Leaf plates are eating plates, bowls or trenchers made with broad leaves, particularly in India and Nepal. In India they are known as Patravali, Pattal, Vistaraku, Vistar or Khali; in Nepal, as Tapari (Nepali: टपरी). They are mainly made from sal, dhak, bauhinia or banyan tree leaves. They can be made in circular shape, by stitching 6 to 8 leaves with tiny wooden sticks (in Nepal, with fine bamboo sticks called sinkaa). Food is served on both fresh and dried pattal. It is popular during traditional meals, festivals and in temples. Its production is a cottage industry in India and Nepal where women manufacture them at home.

== Etymology ==
Patravali, a common name for leaf plates in South Asia, is derived from the Sanskrit word Patra; a term used for both leaf and vessels or utensils. The word Patravali literally translates to "made of leaf".

Leaf plates are known by different names throughout South Asia. For example, the names used in various regions of India and Nepal include Pattal, Tapari, Ilai, Mantharai ilai, Chakluk, Vistaraku, Vistara, Khali, Donne, Duna, and Bota.

- Hindi - पत्तल/दोना (Pattal/ Donā)
- Gujarati - પાંદડું નો થાળી (Pā̃dḍu no Thāḷi)
- Marathi - पांनाचे थाळी (Pā̃nāche Thāḷi)
- Meitei - ꯄꯥꯝꯕꯤ ꯄꯨꯈꯝ (Pāmbi Pukham)
- Assamese - পাতৰ কাহী (Pātôr Kāhi)
- Bengali - পাতার থালা (Pātār Thālā)
- Odia - ଖଲିପତ୍ର/ଖଲି (Khålipåtrå/ Khåli), ଖଲି ତାଟିଆ/ଦନା (Khåli Tāṭiyā/ Dånā - the semicircular ones)
- Maithili - পাতক থাৰী (Pātak Thāri), পাতক বাটী (Pātak Bāṭi - the semicircular ones)
- Nepali - टपरा/टपरी (Ṭaparā/ Ṭapari), दुने (Dune - semicircular ones)
- Telugu - ఇస్తారాకుల/విస్తారాకుల/విస్తారా (Istārākul/ Vistārakul/ Vistārā)
- Kannada - ಎಲೆ ತಟ್ಟೆ (Ele Taṭṭe)
- Tamil - இலைத் தட்டு (Ilaitû Taṭṭu)
- Malayalam - ഇല പാത്ര (Ila Pātra)
- Sinhala - කොළ තහඩුව (Kola Tahaḍruva)

== History ==
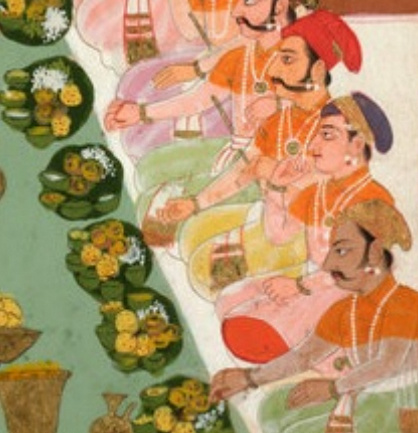
Men eating from fresh pattal plates and bowls, ca. 1712

Plates and bowls made of leaves finds mentioned in Hindu, Jain and Buddhist texts. According to Hindu tradition food eaten on prescribed leaves is believed to have numerous health and spiritual benefits. Buddhist texts like Susiddhikara Sūtra prescribes making offering to deities on lotus leaf and dhak leaves.

Ayurvedic Samhita texts classifies leaves into Ekapatra (unifoliate, such as lotus leaf and plantain leaf), Dvipatra, Tripatra, or Saptapatra and so on according to the number of leaflets. According to Ayurvedic Samhita eating on lotus leaf is as beneficial as eating on golden plate, among prescribed leaves for making Patra include; Nelumbo, Nymphaea rubra, Nymphaea nouchali, Shorea robusta, Bauhinia variegata, Bauhinia vahlii, Bauhinia purpurea, Butea monosperma, Musa acuminata, Ficus religiosa, Ficus benghalensis, Artocarpus heterophyllus, Curcuma longa, Ficus auriculata, Erythrina stricta etc., each of these are believed to improve taste and promotes health benefits according to these texts.

=== Customs ===
In Nepal, pattal is called Tapara/ Tapari, particular made with sal leaves. Nepalese Hindus extensively and compulsorily use it in religious ceremonies, feasts, marriage, birth and funeral rituals. It is also used as a popular substitute for metal or plastic plates in street food culture in Nepal and India. In India, it is a custom to serve food in a patravali on religious festivals and temple offerings like prasadam are also distributed to devotees in pattal bowls. Pattals are also used for wrapping food or steaming food.

In olden days, until a century ago, a would-be son-in-law was tested on his dexterity in making a patravali plate and bowl (for serving more liquid parts of the meal such as daal or stew) before being declared acceptable by the soon to be father-in-law.

== Modern day ==
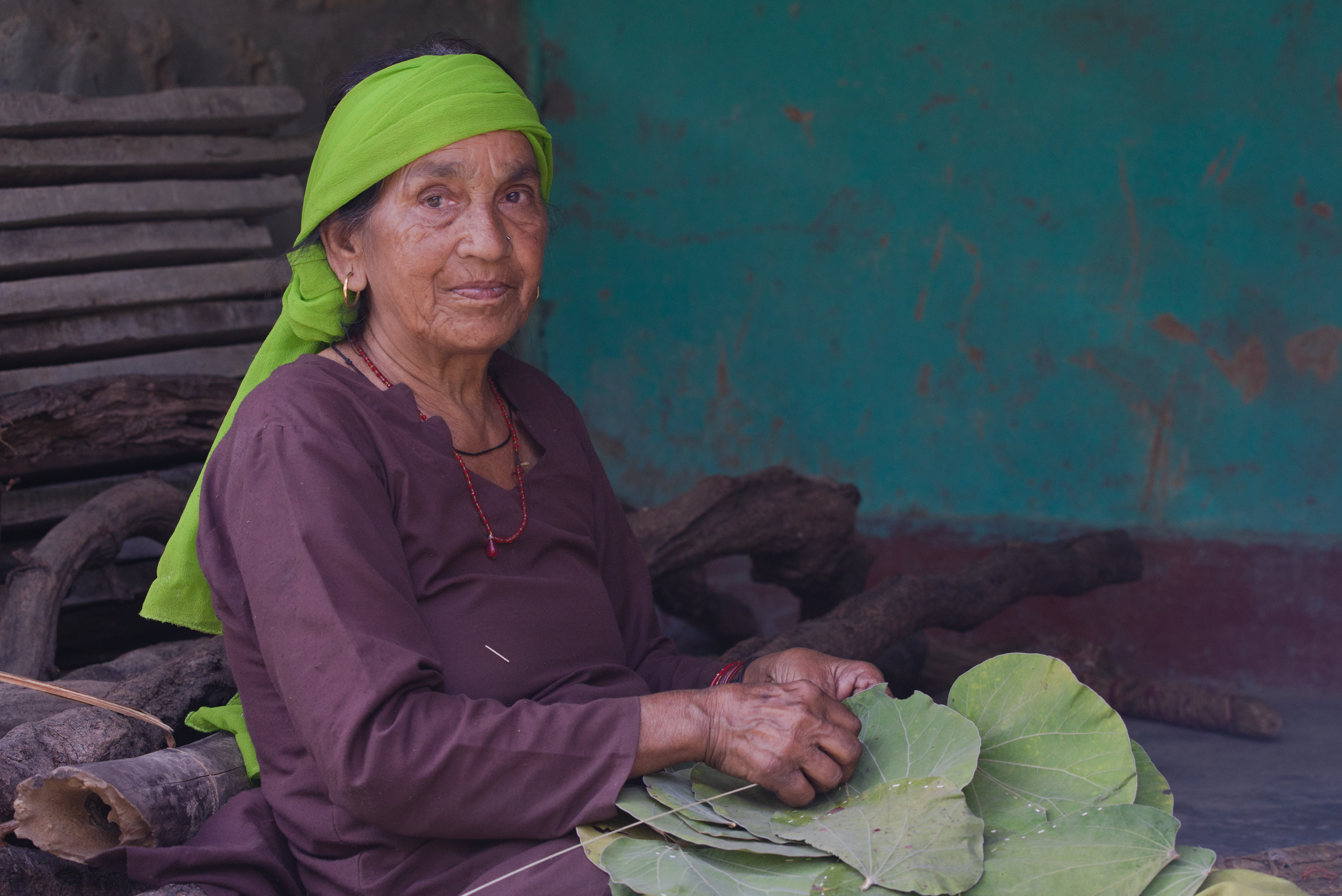
Ramdei, a resident of Nadli, Kangra district, making leaf plates 03

In India and Nepal, making pattal is a cottage industry. The leaves are stitched together with very thin pins made from bamboo, one person can make around 200 pattals a day. Mechanized pattal-making is slowly being introduced in areas like Himachal Pradesh.

The antioxidants (polyphenols) in banana leaves are reported to help fight diseases.

Pattal is one of the most eco-friendly disposable food serving systems. Many other countries such as Germany are realizing its benefits and a few companies have started making pattal commercially. In India pattals can be spotted at every general store.

Tapari is nowadays also used in urban fast food stalls in cities like Kathmandu. It requires practice and skill to build Tapari. There are three types of leaf plates/utensils. Tapari is the biggest of all, is curved and made of green Sal tree leaves. Duna is a bowl designed to hold liquids more easily. Bota is a tiny bowl made of only one sal leaf.

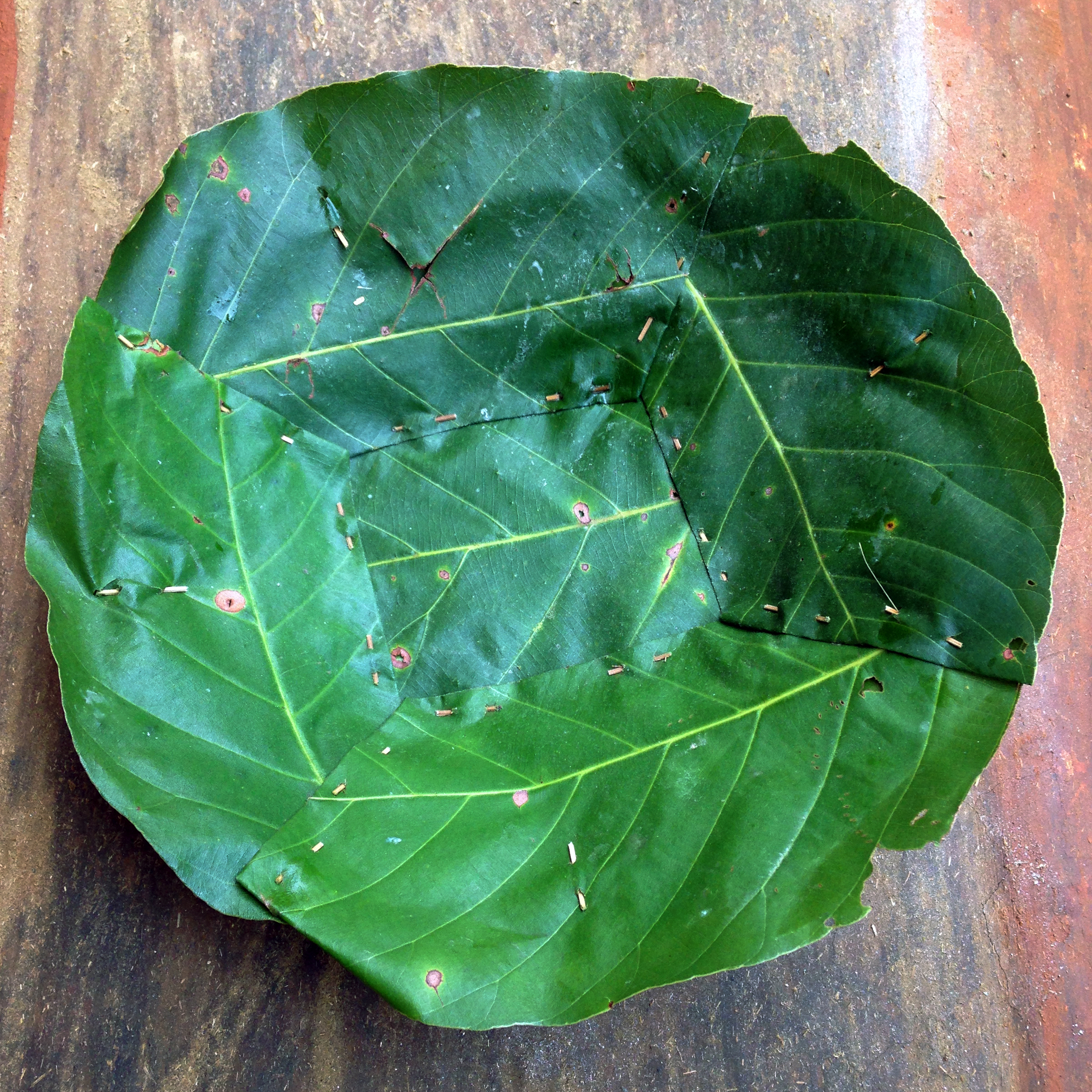
Tapari made with fresh Sal leaves

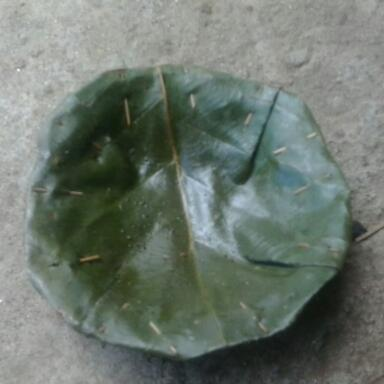
Duna (smaller, more curved Tapari)

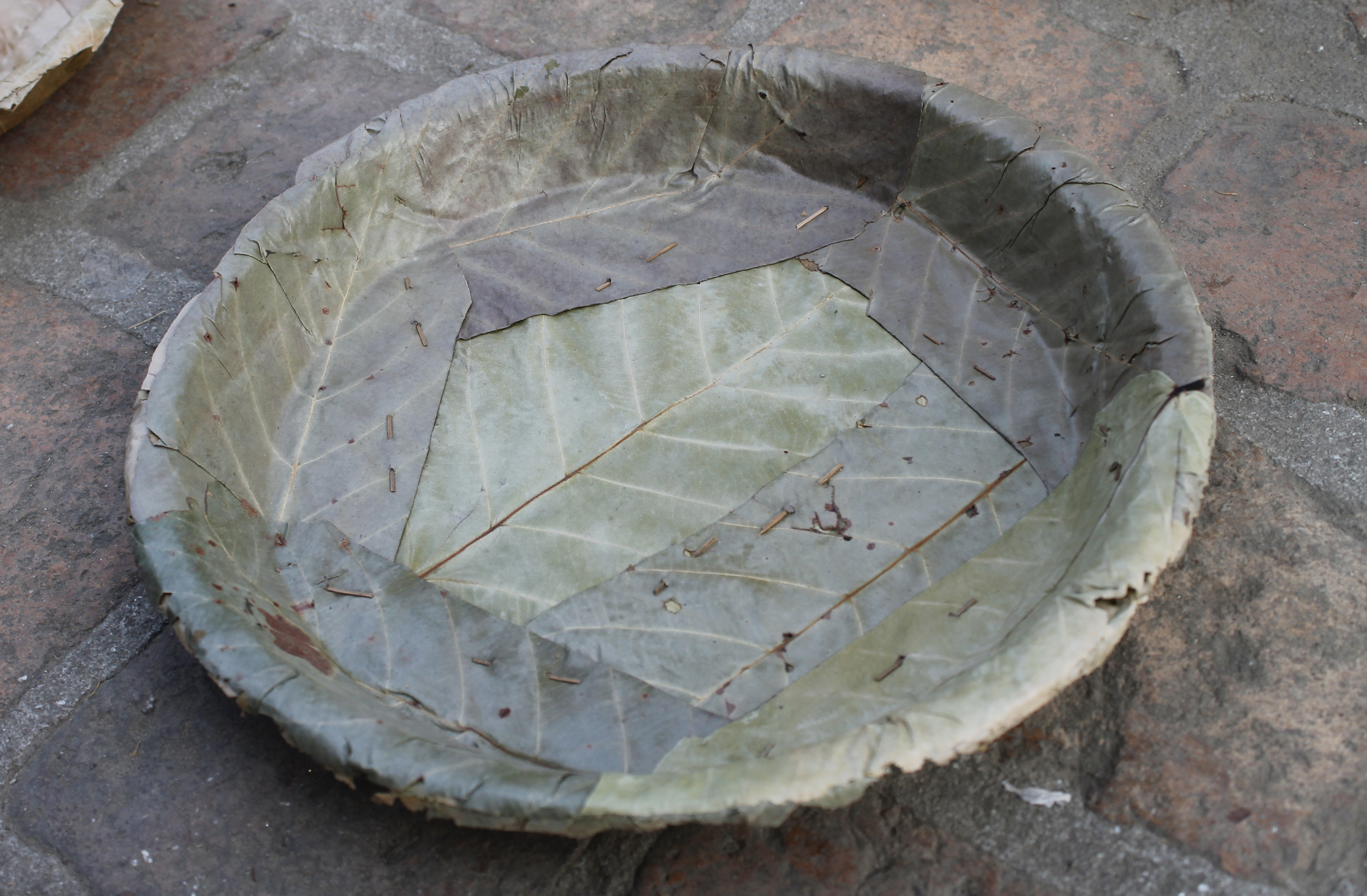
A more modern version of the Tapari that was built using a die and hence its cleaner lines and shape.

== See also ==
- Butea monosperma
- Banana leaf

== Sources ==
- Kora, Aruna Jyothi (2019). "Leaves as dining plates, food wraps and food packing material: Importance of renewable resources in Indian culture". Bulletin of the National Research Centre. 43 (1). doi:10.1186/s42269-019-0231-6. ISSN 2522-8307.
