= Maada roti =

Flatbread from Western Nepal

Maada (Nepali: माडा), also called maada roti, is a roti made from a thick batter of rice. It is eaten in the far-western hilly region of Nepal.

In the far-western hills, including Baitadi and Darchula, rice-flour maada is prepared during the Naharari festival or Maghe Sankranti. On the morning of Sankranti, the food is traditionally offered to crows.
