= Tanakpur =

- City
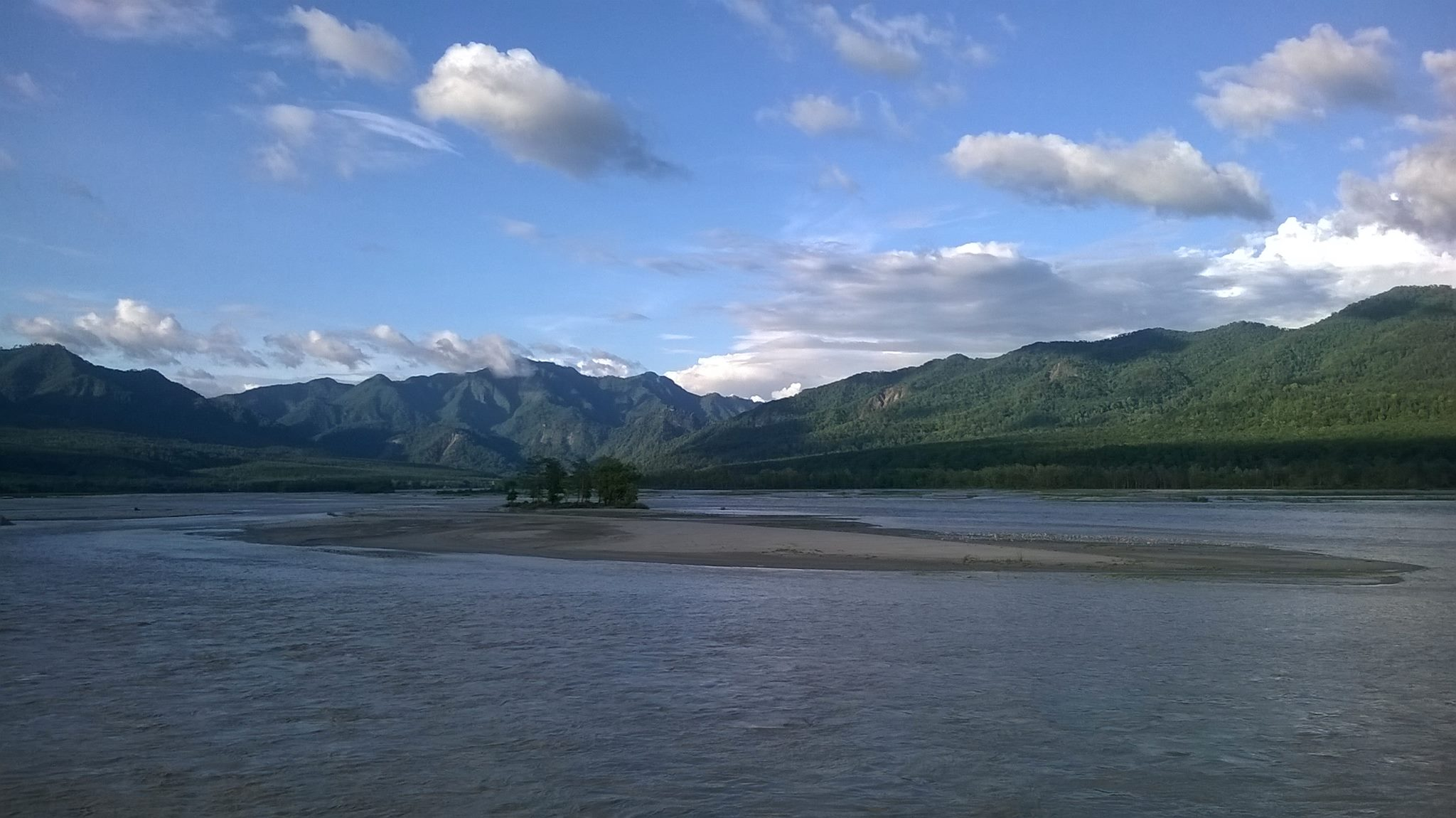
- View of Purnagiri Hills at Indo-Nepal border across Sarda river in Tanakpur

- Location in Uttarakhand, India Tanakpur (India)
- Coordinates: 29.074°N 80.109°E
- Country: India
- State: Uttarakhand
- District: Champawat
- Established: 1880

Government
  - Type: Municipality
  - Body: Tanakpur Municipal Council

Area
  - Total: 11.2 km^{2} (4.3 sq mi)
- Elevation: 255 m (837 ft)

Population (2011)
  - Estimate: 17,626

Languages
  - Official: Hindi
  - Native: Tharu, Rana Tharu, Buksa
- Time zone: UTC+5:30 (IST)
- PIN: 262309
- Telephone code: 05943
- Vehicle registration: UK 03
- Website: uk.gov.in

Tanakpur is a city and a municipal board, near Champawat town in Champawat district of Uttarakhand state of India. Located in the foothills of the Kumaon Himalayas in the northern part of India. The town is the gateway for Purnagiri Temple (around 24 km from here) as well as the 'Gateway to the Kumaon Himalayas'.

Tanakpur is located on the banks of Sarda River and adjacent to the Nepal border. It is the last plain area on the road to Kumaon zone of Uttarakhand and acts as a junction for the Kumaon District's mountainous part. It is also the first point in the Kailash Manasarovar Pilgrimage. Tanakpur is famous for the Devi Purnagiri temple which is situated approximately 24 km at the north of city. National Highway 9 which starts from Askot in Pithoragarh district and passes from Tanakpur to cities including Khatima, Rudrapur, Rampur, Moradabad, Garhmukteshwar, Hapur, Ghaziabad, Delhi, Bahadurgarh, Rohtak, Hisar, Sirsa, Fatehabad and the highway ends at the state of Punjab.

== History ==
This area was completely covered with forests till the first half of the 19th century. Tanakpur, a small city attached to the Nepal border, was a small village. Three miles from here was Brahmadev Mandi (currently in Nepal), which was built by the Katyuri kings (7th and 11th centuries C.E.). The market was completely suppressed due to the landslide in the era, and after some time, a business town was started again.

The city was formed in 1880. It was the winter office of the Sub-divisional officer of Champawat tehsil.

In 1890, when an English traveler came to the place with his friend Manjar Hussi, being influenced by the scenic beauty of this place, Talak and Hussey were the first to come to Bagodora (Sailanigoth) and another Englishman Matsin built bungalows to live near the old tank. After this, efforts were made to settle this city in a planned manner. It was called Talakpur before the name of Lord Talak, but later this place was called Tanakpur. Earlier it was included in the area Almora. In the British period, a 6 feet wide pedestrian was constructed from Tanakpur to Tawaghat, which facilitated a lot of movement.

After many years of British time and independence, Bhotia merchants from Darma and Byas valleys used to come here and trade wool. There has also been a huge import-export with Nepal through this area. In the latter part of the 19th century, rail line connecting Pilibhit was constructed by Awadh-Tirhut railway company here. Along with this the city was connected by road to Delhi, Dehradun, Bareilly and Lucknow. Bageshwar Rail Project, Tanakpur-Jouljibi Motor Road, Pancheshwar Dam etc. It had a population of 692 in 1901.

== Geography ==
Tanakpur is located at 29.08°N 80.12°E. It has an average elevation of 255 metres (837 feet).

== Demographics ==
According to the 2011 census, Tanakpur had a population of almost 17,626. As per 2011 census, 52.5% of the total population are males and 47.5% of the population are females. Tanakpur has an average literacy rate of 78.24%: 84.06% male and 71.84% of females are literate. 12.68% of the total population is under 6 years of age.

According to the 2011 census, 80.32% of people in Tanakpur are Hindus. 18.22% of people follow Islam, which is the largest minority group in the city. In addition, the percentage of followers of Christianity in the city was 0.55%, 0.08% of followers of Jain religion, 0.69% of followers of Sikhism and 0.01% of followers of Buddhism. About 0.13% of people do not belong to any religion.

== Climate ==
The climate of Tanakpur is warm and temperate. According to Köppen climate classification, the code of the city is 'Cfa'. The annual average temperature of Tanakpur is 28.4 °C. The warmest month of year is May–June with 36-38 degree Celsius average temperature. At 15.6 °C on average, January is the coldest month of the year. Most work is 7 mm in rainfall in April, while the highest rainfall with 528 mm is in July. The driest month, and the difference between rainfall in the driest month is 521 mm. Throughout the year, the temperature can be seen at 15.2 degree Celsius.

== Economy ==
Tanakpur was a major trade mart of the Kumaon division in British India. The local produces of the region included Timber, Catechu, hides, honey and other minor forest produces, which were traded between November and May. The Bhotiyas used to bring down Wool and Borax from Tibet, and carried back Sugar and Clothes. Sugar and Salt, on the other hand, were imported from the Hill tracts of Almora and Nepal, in exchange for Turmeric, chillies and Ghee. By 1890, the Taklakot-Tanakpur trade route, used by the Bhotiya traders, had complete control over the wool trade of Mansarovar region.

The income from the Tanakpur depot is considered one of the major sources of income for Uttarakhand Transport Corporation.

== Connectivity ==
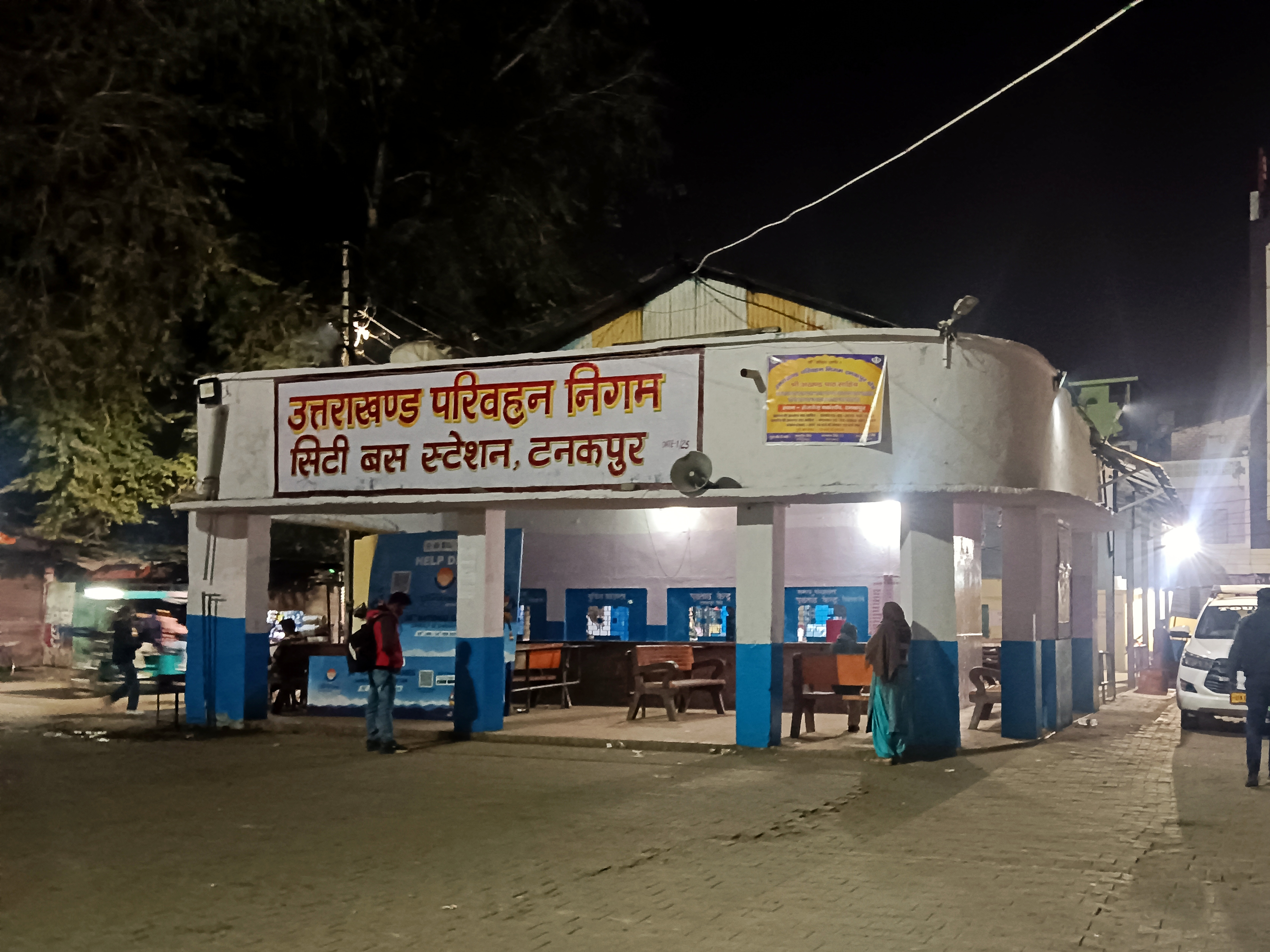
Tanakpur Bus Station

By air: The nearest airport to Tanakpur is Pantnagar Airport situated 97 km away in the Nainital district of Uttarakhand state. Taxis are available from Pantnagar Airport to Tanakpur. Pantnagar is connected to Delhi with daily flights. Pant Nagar Airport is well connected by motorable roads with Tanakpur.

Another major airport from Tanakpur is Bareilly Airport which is located just 103 km away and from where direct flights to New Delhi, Bengaluru and Mumbai are there.

By rail: Tanakpur railway station is well connected to major cities of India via rail network. The North Eastern Railway has sent proposal to the railway board to start more express trains from Tanakpur to expand railway network.

The ex-railway minister of India, Mukul Roy announced in railway budget 2012 that he is pursuing the inclusion of four critical projects as national projects, which include Bhanupli–Leh line, Jammu–Poonch line, Tanakpur–Bageshwar line and Rupai Siding–Parshuram Kund line.

By road: Tanakpur is well connected by motorable roads with major destinations of Uttarakhand state and northern India. Tanakpur Bus Depot is the largest Depot in Uttarakhand and bus services are extended up to states such as ISBT Anand Vihar (Delhi), Uttar Pradesh, Himachal Pradesh, Haryana, Punjab, Rajasthan, Madhya Pradesh, and Jammu. Taxi and buses are easily available from Tanakpur to the major destinations of Uttarakhand and nearby states.

== Media ==
Tanakpur has an All India Radio Relay station known as Akashvani Tanakpur. It broadcasts on specified FM frequencies.

== Education ==
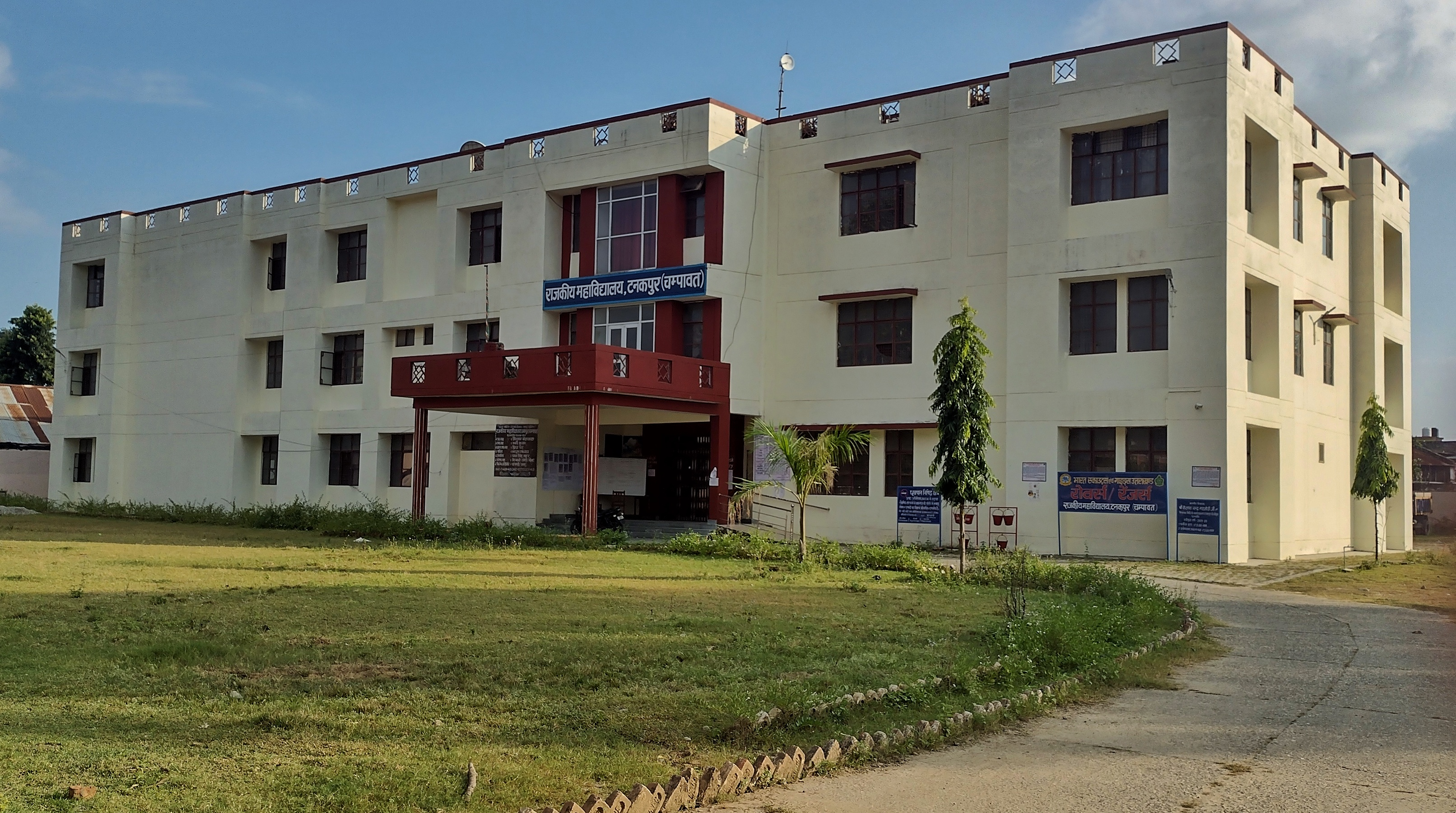
The Govt Degree College, Tanakpur is affiliated to the SSJ University, Almora

As of 2011, Tanakpur had a total of 22 Government financed educational institutions imparting primary education. These consist of 11 Primary Schools, 5 middle schools, 3 secondary schools and 3 senior secondary schools. The Government Degree College, Tanakpur was established in the year 2004 by State Government. It is affiliated to the Soban Singh Jeena University, Almora. Tanakpur also houses the Dr. A.P.J. Abdul Kalam Institute of Technology, one of the eight constituent colleges of Veer Madho Singh Bhandari Uttarakhand Technological University.

== Places of interest ==
- Purnagiri Temple: One of the 108 Siddha Peeths, this Devi Temple is 21 km from Tanakpur, Tunyas is 17 km and from there 3 km trek leads to Purnagiri Temple. Tanakpur is linked by direct bus service with Lucknow, Delhi, Agra, Dehradun, Kanpur and other Districts.
  During Navratras, in the Chaitra month of the Indian calendar, devotees in large number come here to have their wishes fulfilled. After worshipping Mata Purnagiri, people also pay their tributes to her loyal devotee Bada Sidth Nath at Brahmadev and Mahendra Nagar in Nepal.
- Shri Adya Shakti Peeth (Boom Temple): A spiritual place near on the way to Purnagiri, famous for its white sand beach/river bank where pilgrims take a holy dip in river Sharda. Adhya Shakti Peeth (Boom Temple), enshrined by Guru Maa is just near to this place. Rafting and camping is available in Boom, managed under government adventure program.
- Barrage Road Tanakpur Power Station, NHPC: At the shore of Tanakpur, local people regularly visit here for evening and morning walks and to observe the sunrise and sunset.
- Shyamlatal: Shyamlatal is a natural lake located in a beautiful hamlet at 30 km from Tanakpur town. As the name indicates, the lake is known by the word Shyaam which means little dark complex color used to describe Lord Krishna in Hindu religion. The blackish color of the lake is due to its muddy water and surrounded by hills.
  Situated 1,500 meters above the sea level, the lake Shyamala Tal is located at 22.6 km from Tanakpur main market and about 56 km from Champawat Bus station. Shyamlatal Lake covers an area of more than 1.5 km^{2} area. There is a famous Swami Vivekananda Ashram located on the banks of lake visited by many people around the year.
- 8Mile: Famous place amongst local people for its seasonal waterfall and sightseeing views of Sharda valley.
- Nandhaur Wildlife Sanctuary: Nandhaur Wildlife Sanctuary is a wildlife sanctuary in Uttarakhand, India that was created in 2012. The sanctuary is part of the Terai Arc Landscape (TAL), a forest zone that stretches from Uttarakhand in India and extends into Nepal. A new gateway to enter this sanctuary was inaugurated in the year 2017. Tour-guides and Gypsys are available for hire at Tanakpur office to lead visitors in sightseeing, birdwatching, camping and jungle safari.

== Gallery ==
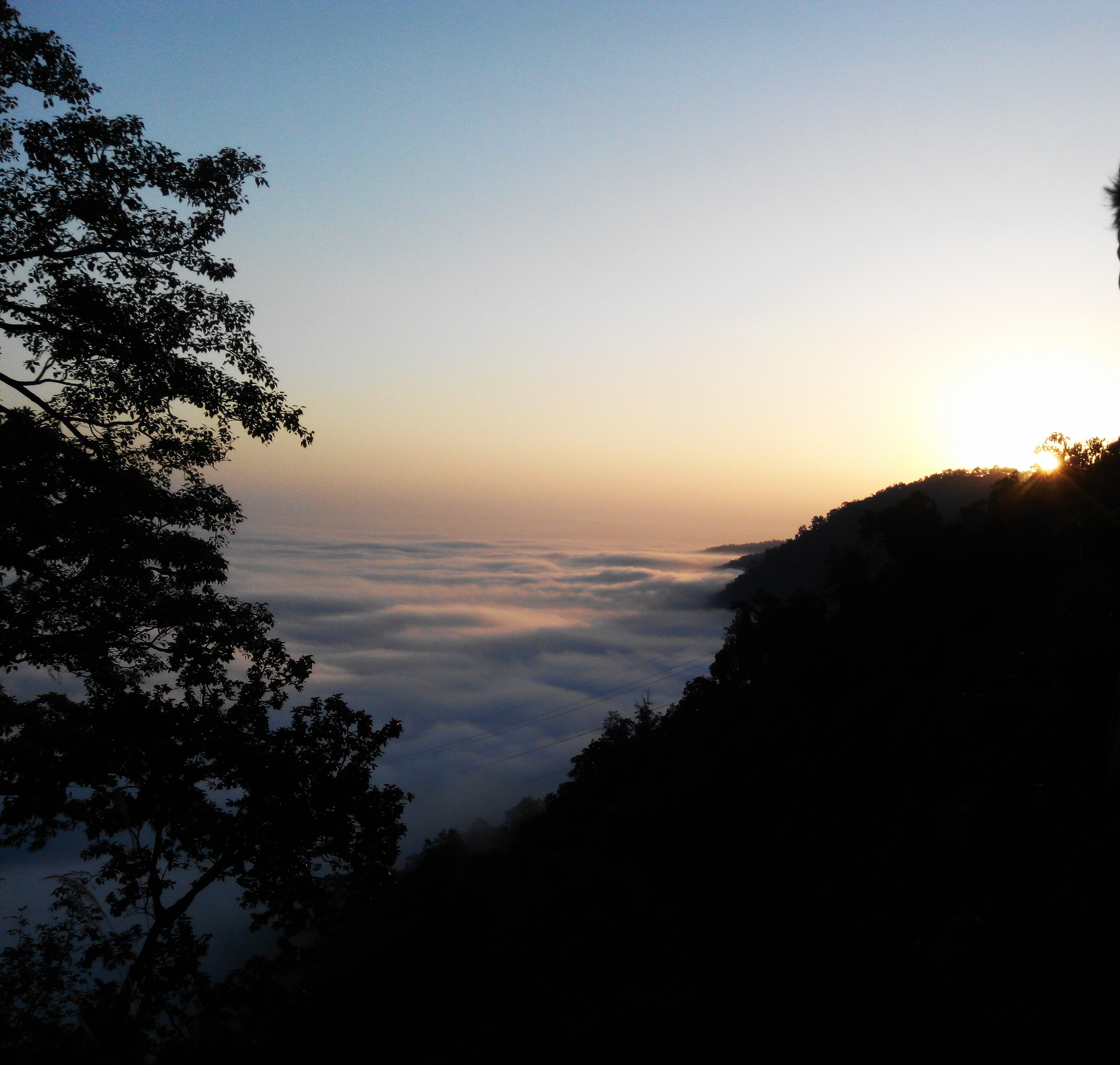
Sunset from 8Mile

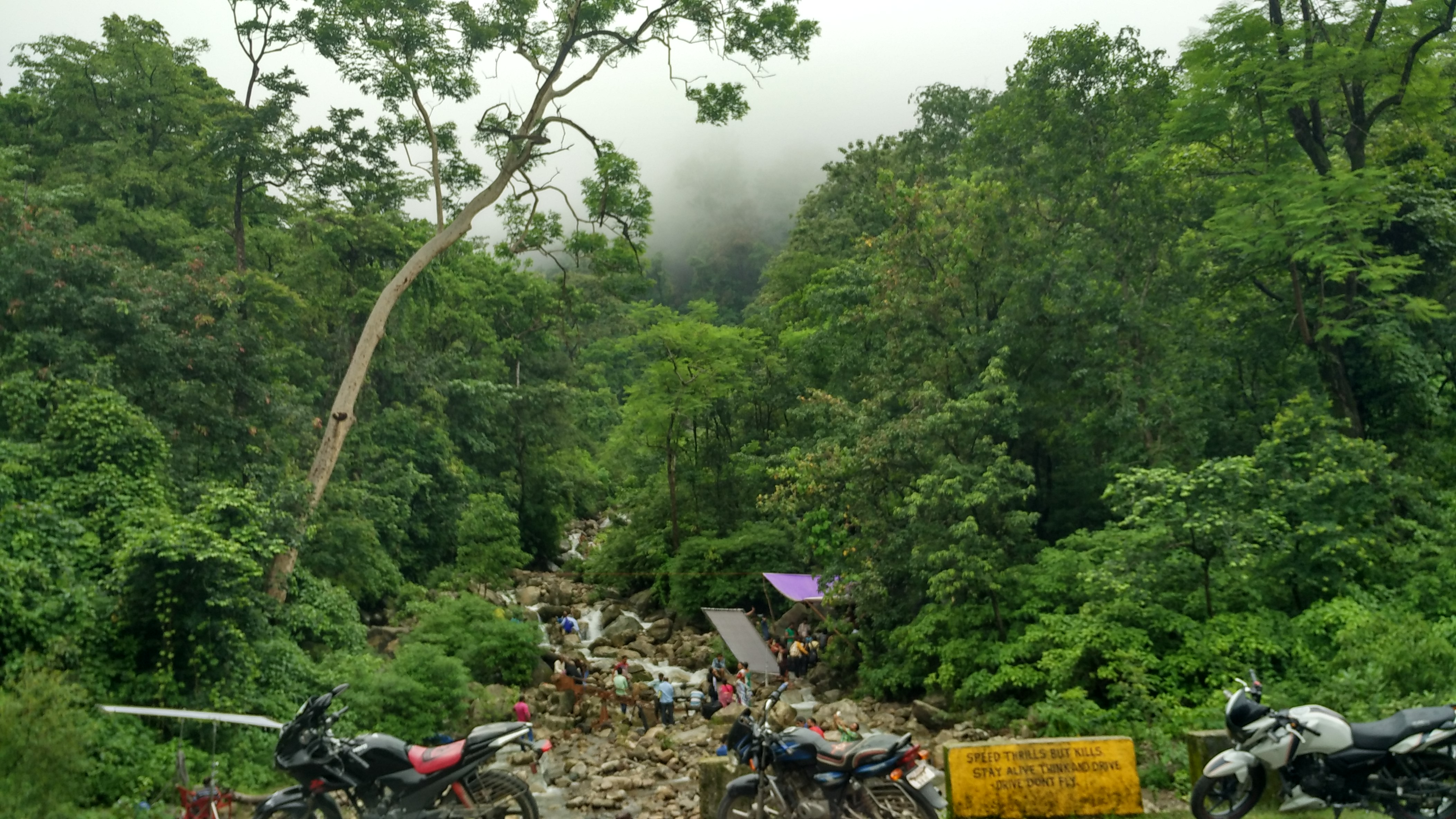
A movie shooting near 8Mile

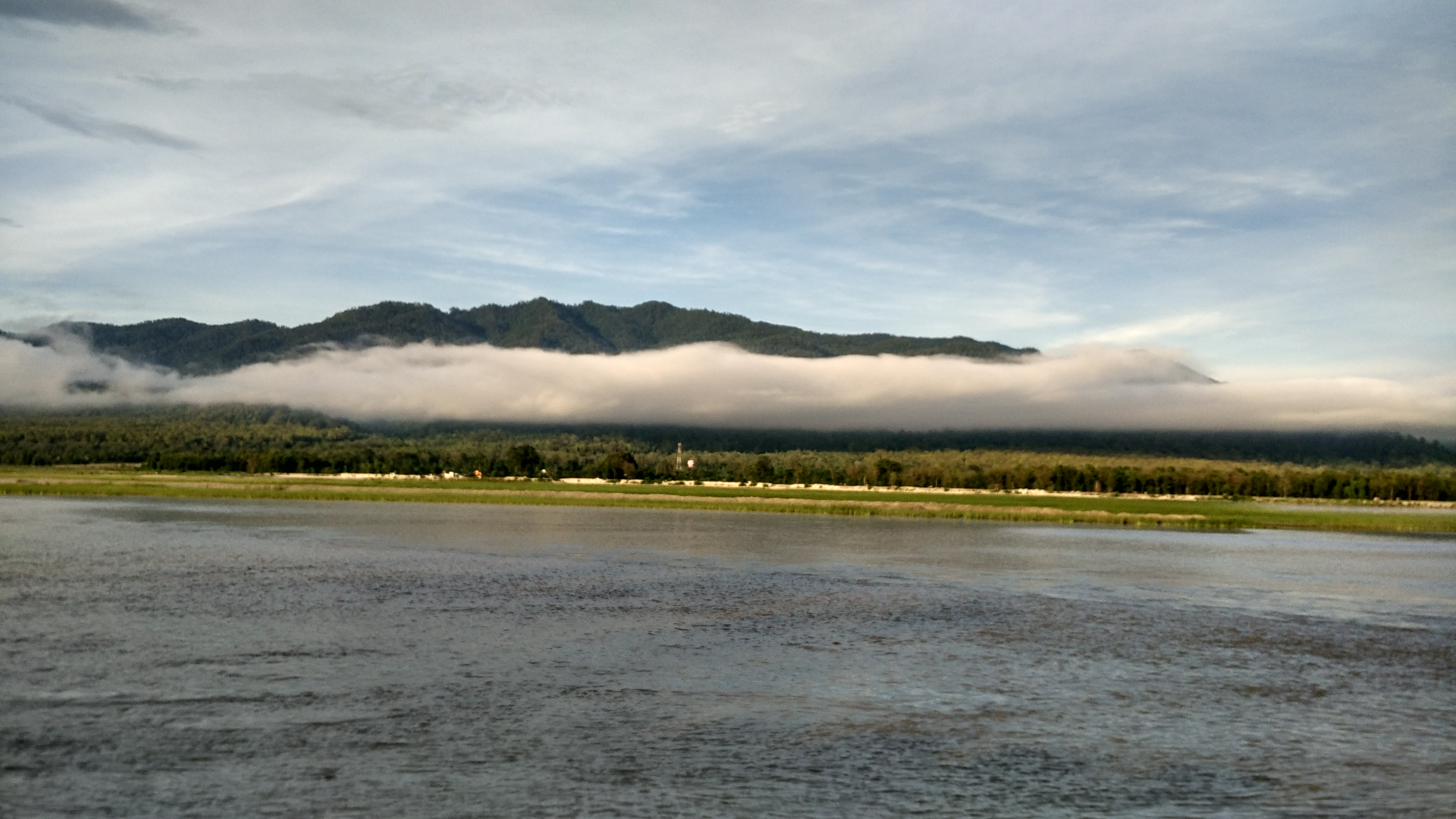
Eastside Tanakpur (Near river Sharda)
