= Dangaura Tharu =

One of the Indo Aryan Tharu languages spoken by the Tharu people of Nepal

- Native to: Nepal, India
- Ethnicity: Tharu
- Native speakers: 670,000 (2003–2007)
- Language family: Indo-European: Indo-Iranian; Indo-Aryan; Eastern; Bihari; Tharu; Dangaura Tharu
- Dialects: Dangaha
- Writing system: Devanagari

Official status
- Official language in: Tharuban of Nepal

Language codes
- ISO 639-3: thl
- Glottolog: dang1260

Danguara Tharu also known as Dangauli Tharu, Dangora Tharu, or Dangura Tharu is one of the Tharu languages spoken by the Tharu people in the Dang, Kapilvastu, Banke, and Bardiya districts of the Lumbini Province and in Kailali and Kanchanpur district of Sudurpaschim Province of Nepal, primarily in the Western Terai Region as well as in Bahraich, Gorakhpur, and Lakhimpur Kheri districts of Uttar Pradesh in India.

Dangaura Tharu exhibits several distinctive features. Its sentence structure follows the Subject-Object-Verb (SOV) order, where the subject precedes the object, and the verb typically comes last. Postpositions are used to indicate spatial relationships, appearing after nouns. The language adopts a noun head initial structure, with genitives positioned after noun heads. Adjectives and numerals precede the noun they modify, contributing to the overall word order. Interrogative pronouns or content question words remain in situ within sentences. Case markings play a crucial role in indicating various constituents within clauses. Verbal affixation is employed to convey information about person, number, and occasionally gender.

Dangaura Tharu features a system of tense and aspect marking, enabling speakers to convey nuanced temporal information. Additionally, Danguara Tharu incorporates passive constructions and voice distinctions. Notably, it lacks tonal characteristics. Phonologically, it comprises 34 consonant and 6 vowel phonemes, including nasal variations.

Dangaura Tharu is characterized by an SOV (Subject-Object-Verb) word order and employs postpositions. The language features noun heads initially, with genitives positioned after them. Adjectives and numerals precede noun heads, and content question words remain in situ. Clause constituents are denoted through case-marking, and verbal affixation is used for indicating person, number, and occasionally gender, along with expressing tense-aspect. The language is non-tonal and encompasses 34 consonant and 6 vowel phonemes, including nasal variations.

Dangaura Tharu exhibits high vitality, although there is a noticeable increase in the incorporation of Nepali loanwords. Intelligibility varies, with percentages ranging from 95% to 97% with Kathoriya and encountering some difficulty with speakers from India, particularly those belonging to the Eastern Hindi Group. Lexical similarities exist with languages such as Deukhuri, Sonha, Rana Tharu, Desauriya, Central Tharu, Kathariya Tharu and Kochila Tharu, reflecting both shared linguistic elements and unique characteristics of Dangaura Tharu within this linguistic landscape.
