= Buksa =

Buksa may refer to:

- Buksa people, an ethnic group of India
- Buksa language, an Indo-Aryan language

== People with the surname ==
- Adam Buksa (born 1996), Polish footballer
- Aleksander Buksa (born 2003), Polish footballer
- Nataliya Buksa (born 1996), Ukrainian chess player
- Sindija Bukša (born 1997), Latvian sprinter

== See also ==
- Buxa, West Bengal, India
- Boksa (disambiguation)
