= Kathariya Tharu =

Indo-Aryan language

- Native to: India, Nepal
- Ethnicity: Tharu
- Native speakers: 110,000 in Nepal (2006)
- Language family: Indo-European: Indo-Iranian; Indo-Aryan; Eastern; Bihari; Tharu; Kathariya Tharu
- Writing system: Devanagari

Official status
- Official language in: Tharuban of Nepal

Language codes
- ISO 639-3: tkt
- Glottolog: kath1250

Kathariya Tharu, also known as Kathoriya Tharu, is one of the Indo Aryan languages spoken by the Tharu people of Nepal and India. It is a language spoken in the Sudurpashchim Province of Nepal, particularly in the Kailali District, including areas like Bardagoriya, Bhajani, Ghodaghodi, Joshipur. Additionally, it is spoken in the Uttar Pradesh state of India, specifically in Bahraich and Lakhimpur Kheri districts near the Nepal border.

There are speech differences between the dialects spoken in Nepal and those in India. The lexical similarity of Kathariya Tharu is around 70%–76% with Dangaura Tharu and Rana Tharu, 66% with Hindi, 66%–69% with Buksa, 63% with Central Tharu, and 51%–59% with Kochila Tharu.

In terms of linguistic characteristics, Kathariya Tharu follows an SOV (Subject-Object-Verb) word order, uses postpositions, and has a tendency for noun head final (unmarked). There has been some language shifting to Hindi, but Kathariya Tharu is still used by all, alongside Hindi and Nepali in the region.
