= Boksa =

Boksa may mean

- Bokša (Hungarian: Boksa), a village in Slovakia, now city part of Stropkov
- Milan Bokša (born 1951), Czech football manager
- Boksa people, an ethnic group of India
- Boksa language, a language of India

== See also ==
- Buksa (disambiguation)
- Boxa
