= Dhikpur =

Dhikpur ढीकपुर
- Village Development Committee
- Location in Nepal
- Coordinates: 28.04°N 82.37°E
- Country: Nepal
- Province: Lumbini Province
- District: Dang Deokhuri District

Population (1991)
  - Total: 8,085
- Time zone: UTC+5:45 (Nepal Time)

Dhikpur is a town and Village Development Committee in Dang Deokhuri District in Lumbini Province of south-western Nepal. At the time of the 1991 Nepal census it had a population of 8,085 persons living in 1,112 households. It had nine villages. The Village Development Committee office was located in the village of Dhikpur. At the present, the Village Development Committee has been merged with the sub-metropolitan city of Ghorahi.
