= Padmodaya Public Model Secondary School =

- पद्मोदय पब्लिक नमुना माध्यमिक विद्यालय
- Ghorahi, Dang; Nepal

Information
- Type: Public
- Established: 1947; 79 years ago
- Principal: Lok Bahadur Basnet
- Nickname: P.P.M.S.S
- Website: www.ppmss.edu.np

Padmodaya Public Model Secondary School (PPMSS; Nepali: पद्मोदय पब्लिक नमुना माध्यमिक विद्यालय) is an English and Nepali medium co-educational school established in 2004 BS. The school has been declared a model public secondary school with a well-managed teaching and learning environment in 2062 BS.

It runs from Nursery to Grade 12, including the CTEVT Annex Program from 2059 BS. It focuses on both foundation and college-level students with quality education. Understanding the importance of the English language, it offers both English and Nepali as mediums of instruction. The school offers a Diploma in Automobile Engineering with affiliation from CTEVT."

== Courses Offered ==
- General Education
- Science Faculty
- Management Faculty
- Education Faculty
- Computer Stream/Trade

=== CTEVT ===
- Diploma in Electronic
- Junior Computer Technician
- Diploma in Electrical Sub-overseas
- TSLC
- Social Mobilization

== Award ==
Padmodaya Public Model Secondary School has been awarded with international school award 2015-2018 by British Council, Nepal. The school was qualified for embedding international dimension in the curriculum and enhancing 21st Century Core skills among the students.

Year	Category	Outcome	Ref.
2019	District Level Interschool Cricket Tournament	WINNER	
2020	12th President Running Shield Ghorahi	WINNER	
2021	Dangali Interschool Cricket Cup	WINNER	
2022	Second Laxman Dangi Memorial Cup-2078 Interschool Football Tournament	WINNER	
