= Bhoksa people =

Boksa or Buksa
Regions with significant populations
- Uttarakhand: 46,771
- Uttar Pradesh: 4,367

Languages
- Buksa language, Tharu languages regional languages

Religion
- Hinduism, traditional beliefs

Related ethnic groups
- Chhetri · Khas · Pokhariya · Banrawats · Kumaoni people · Rana Tharu

Bhoksa, also known as Buksa/Bukhasiya, are indigenous peoples living mainly in the Indian states of Uttarakhand and Uttar Pradesh. They are mostly concentrated in Dehradun and Nainital districts of Uttrakhand in the foothills of the outer Himalayas. They are also found in the Bijnor district of Uttar Pradesh. Both communities have been granted Scheduled Tribe status.

== History ==
The Bhoksa speak the Buksa language.

The language is spoken in Uttarakhand, mainly in southwestern Nainital district, along a diagonal from Ramnagar to Dineshpur. It is spoken in around 130 villages in Kichha and Kashipur tehsils, some in Bijnor and Pauri Garhwal district.

== Present circumstances ==
As of 2001, the Bhoksa of Uttarakhand were classified as a Scheduled Tribe under the Indian government's reservation program of affirmative action. As Buksa, they are similarly classified in Uttar Pradesh.

== See also ==
- List of Scheduled Tribes in Uttar Pradesh
