= Sonha language =

Indo-Aryan language

Sonha
- Sunha
- Native to: Nepal
- Region: Lumbini, Sudurpashchim
- Ethnicity: Sonha
- Native speakers: 20,000 (2020)
- Language family: Indo-European: Indo-Iranian; Indo-Aryan; Central Zone; Western Hindi; Sonha
- Writing system: Unwritten

Language codes
- ISO 639-3: soi
- Glottolog: sonh1238
- ELP: Sonha

The Sonha language also known as Sonaha, Sunha, or Sunah is an Indo-Aryan language spoken by the Sonha people in Lumbini Province, specifically in Bardiya District, covering Geruwa and Rajapur municipalities. It is also spoken in Sudurpashchim Province, particularly in Kanchanpur District and Bhimdatta of Nepal. Sonha exhibits linguistic similarities with Awadhi, with reported lexical similarities of 69% with Rana Tharu, 73% with Kathariya Tharu, and 72% with Dangaura Tharu. Notably, Sonha and Kathoriya serve as a lexical bridge connecting Rana and Dangaura varieties of Tharu.

The linguistic features of Sonha include a SOV (Subject-Object-Verb) word order, postpositions, noun head final structure, content question words in situ, case-marking for indicating clause constituents, verbal affixation marking number, split ergativity, and the presence of passives and voice. The language is non-tonal.

Sonha speakers engage in mixed-use activities, involving interactions related to friends, religion, and work. The community comprises both young people and adults, with "Sonha" representing an occupational caste, particularly associated with gold panning. The religious affiliations within the Sonha community includes Hinduism, Christianity, and traditional beliefs.

The language is considered threatened due to losing speakers and no monolingual speakers of the language.
