= Lampucchwa Tharu people =

Morangiya Tharu मोरङिया थारू
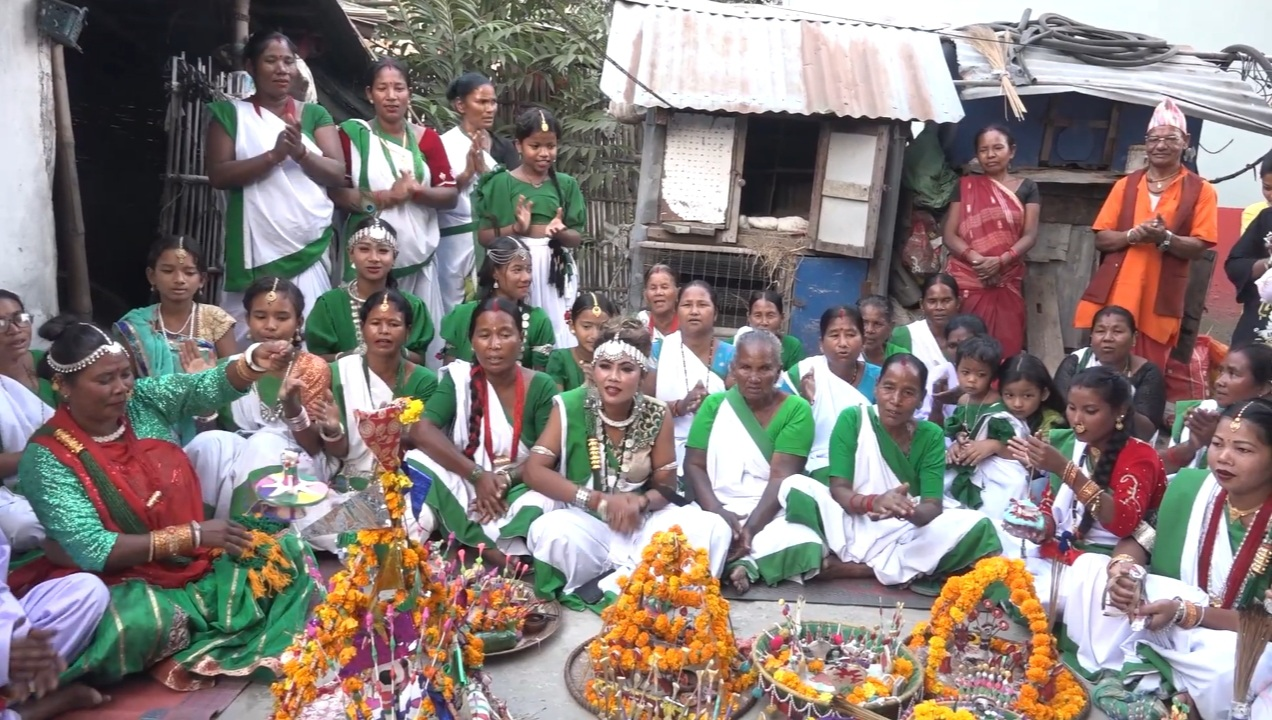
- Morangiya Tharu women of Eastern Terai

Regions with significant populations
- Nepal: Sunsari, Morang

Languages
- Kochila Tharu, Tharu languages, Nepali

Religion
- Hinduism, traditional beliefs (Dhami)

Related ethnic groups
- Dhimal, Rajbanshi people, various endogamous subgroups of Tharu people

Lampucchwa Tharu or Morangiya Tharu is one of the endogamous subgroups of Tharu people which are an ethnic group indigenous to the Terai, the southern foothills of the Himalayas in Nepal and India. Likewise Morangiya Tharu dwells in the Eastern plain or Terai of Nepal. They can be found mainly in the districts of Morang and Sunsari. Though found in two districts, they are called by Morangiya Tharu as those two districts were one district before 1962. Within the group, they refer to themselves as Morangiya Tharu, but people from other regions would call them Lampucchwa (as the women have tail-like structures on their dress).

== Distribution ==
The Lampucchwa Tharu people are distributed in Morang and Sunsari districts of Koshi province Nepal.

== Culture ==
=== Food ===
They plant rice, mustard, corn and lentils, but also collect forest products such as wild fruits, vegetables, medicinal plants and materials to build their houses. They hunt deer, rabbit and wild boar, and go fishing in the rivers and oxbow lakes. They keep domestics animals like cows, goats, pigs and water buffalo, and birds like pigeons, chickens and ducks. They live close to nature. A group of Tharu people who do not eat pig are said Thokra, and these people have a belief that if they consume such meat their kul devi becomes angry and can cause disease in their family. However, others do not have this belief.

=== Dress ===
Achra Khadki is the name of a traditional attire worn by women. Khadki is a hand-woven piece of cloth that is only made by the Dhimal community. Achra is fine cotton or any other special fabric which has beautiful handmade paintings. Generally, it is white in color but different colors are worn for different occasions. The Achra has a tail-like structure which is called Puccha.

=== Language ===
A traditional healer describing medicinal properties of local plants in Eastern (Saptariya) Tharu

Morangiya Tharus speak Kochila or Morangiya Tharu language which differs from other Tharu sub-groups. There are estimated to be around 160,000 speakers of Morangiya Tharu in Eastern Nepal.

=== Religion ===
The spiritual beliefs and moral values of the Tharu people are closely linked to the natural environment. The pantheon of their gods comprises a large number of deities that live in the forest, which the Tharu people ask for support before entering the forest. The Tharu can also be found following Hinduism and Christianity nowadays, although some still have traditional beliefs on kul deuta.

=== Marriage system ===
They practice arranged marriage as well as love marriage. In order to arrange marriage (maagi biwaha) the elder members from the family and relatives arrive to girl's house to see the bride that is termed as Dekhasunni. Likewise the elder members of bride and relatives go to groom's house to offer blessings and gifts that is termed as Sakati. The marriage ceremony lasts for 5 days, which includes Kasakiti Kumaran, Chumana, and Manga Mani. Morangiya Tharu do not follow dowry system but a few localities offer gifts or lands to their son in law and daughters.
