= Pindeshwor Vidyapeeth =

Campus of Nepal Sanskrit University

Coordinates: 26.815478°N 87.295643°E

- Type: Public Coeducational
- Established: 12 December 1951 (74 years ago)
- Parent institution: Nepal Sanskrit University
- Principal: Kashinath Paudel
- Academic staff: Sanskrit
- Location: Dharan, Nepal
- Campus: 31.2404 acars

Pindeshwor Vidyapeeth is one of the affiliated government Sanskrit colleges of Nepal Sanskrit University at Dharan Sub-Municipality in Sunsari District of Nepal. This campus offers Uttarmadhyama (Intermediate) as well as Shastri (Bachelor) levels of study.
