= Rana Tharu people =

Ethnic group in Nepal

Rana Tharu
राना थारू
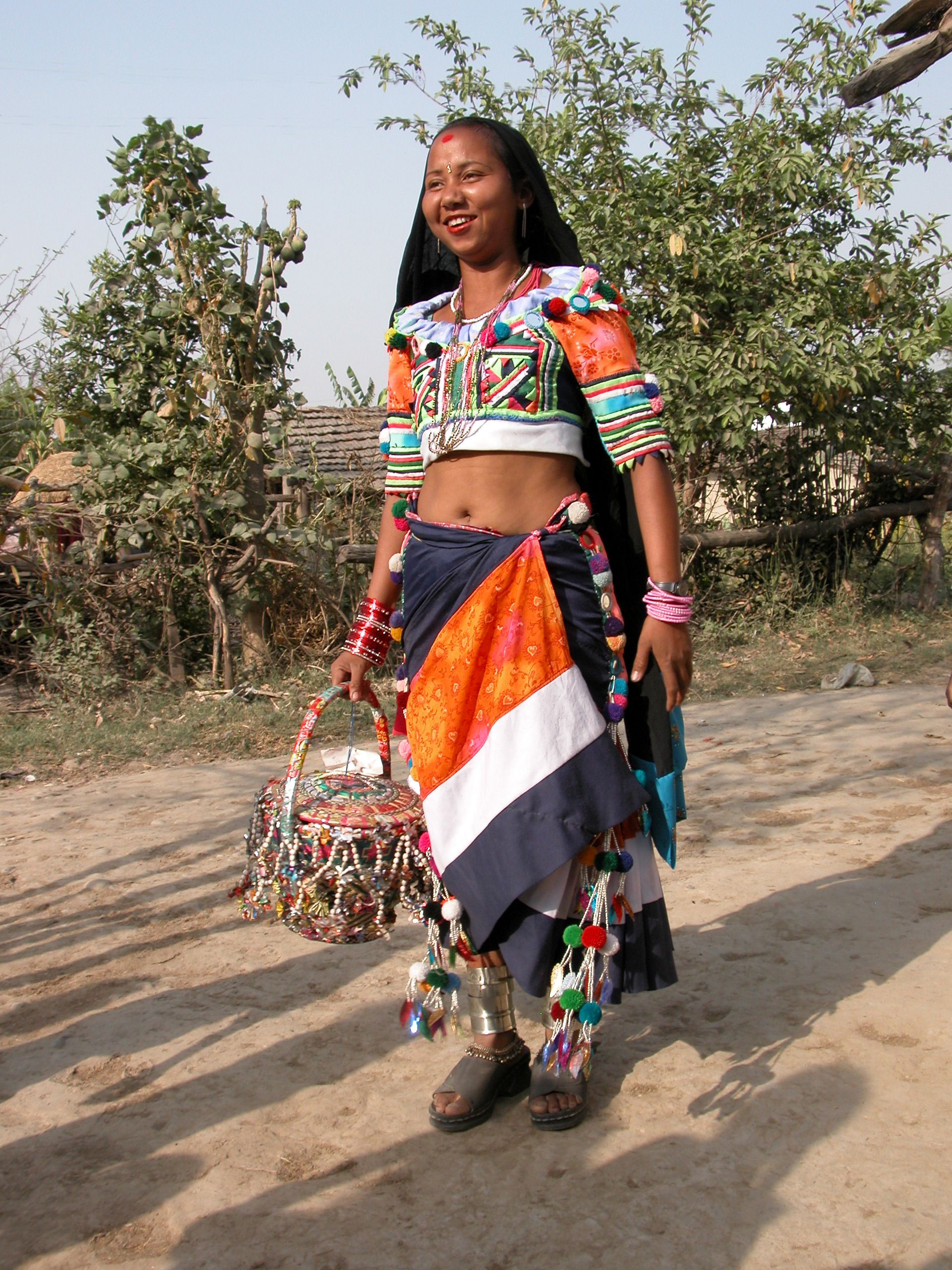
- Rana Tharu woman

Regions with significant populations
- Nepal: 83,308
- India: 91,342

Languages
- Rana Tharu, Nepali, Hindi

Religion
- Hinduism

Related ethnic groups
- Bhoksa people; Tharu people

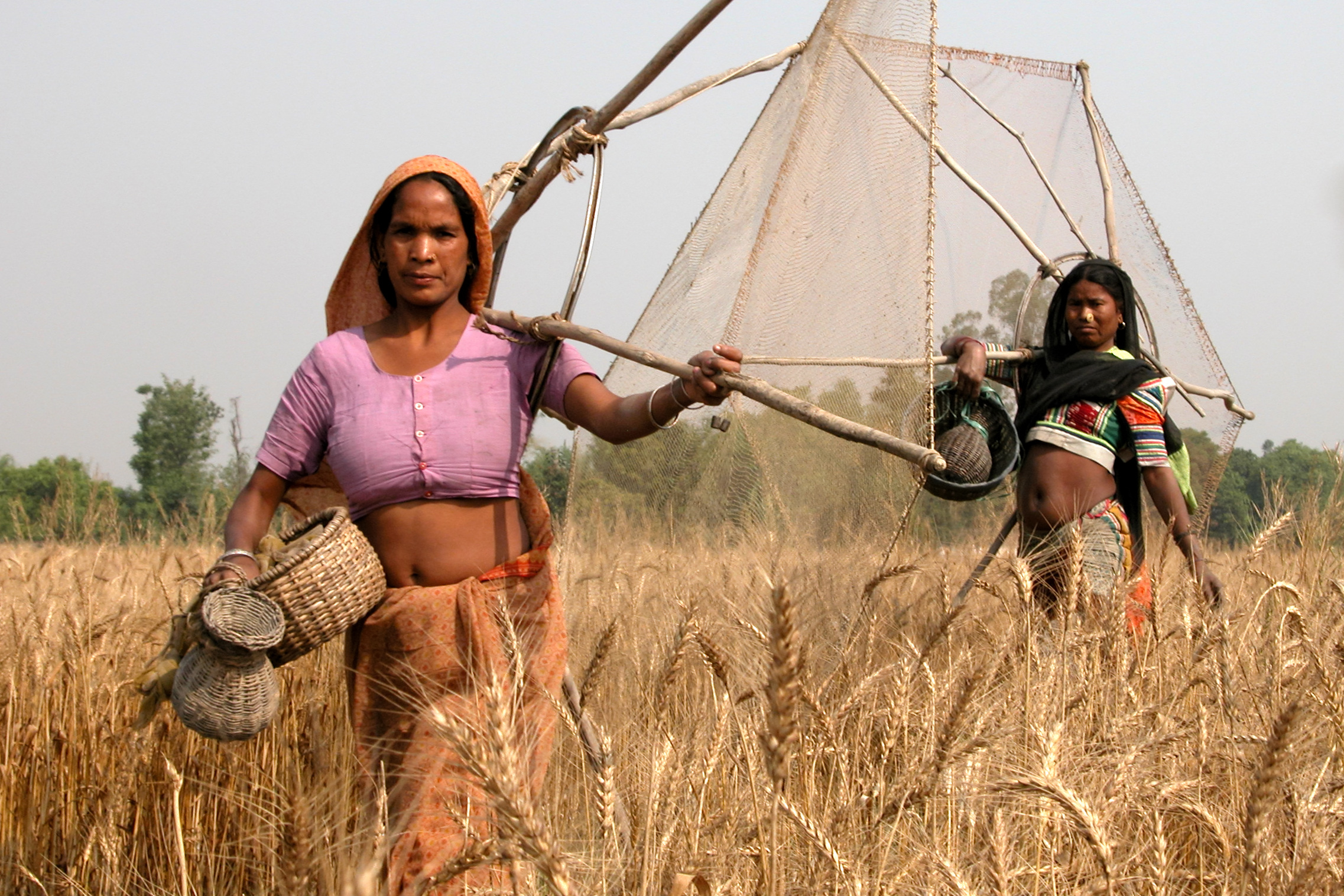
Two Rana Tharu women preparing to fish.

Rana Tharu is an ethnic group generally classified as part of the Tharu people of Nepal and India. They are living in Kailali and Kanchanpur Districts of the far western Nepali Terai and also in India, in Udham Singh Nagar district, Uttarakhand and Kheri district of Uttar Pradesh. As of 2001, Rana Tharu people were the largest of five scheduled tribes in Uttarakhand, with a population of 256,129 accounting for 33.4% of all scheduled tribes.

The Rana Tharu community of Kailali and Kanchanpur districts have long demanded an identity separate from other Tharus. The Nepal Charter dated 18 May 2020 lists Rana Tharus as a distinct ethnic group; this listing was celebrated by Rana Tharus across Kaliali and Kanchanpur.

== Origin ==
The Rana Tharus in western Nepal claim to be of Rajput origin and to have migrated from the Thar Desert in Rajasthan to Nepal's Far Western Terai region after the defeat of Maharana Pratap against a Mughal emperor in the 16th century. Most scholars refute this claim. The Rana Tharu version of the origin myth as that of Indian origin is long-standing and locally shared by all Tharus in Nepal’s far west, a version that has been reported by anthropologists and travelers from the time of the British East India Company up to the present.

== Marriage system ==
Traditionally, Rana Tharus practice arranged marriages, which parents often arrange already during the couple's childhood. The wedding ceremony is held when the bride and groom reach marriable age. The ceremony lasts several days, involving all the relatives of the two families. Among the Rana Tharus in Bardiya District, it is also custom to arrange marriage of a daughter in exchange for getting a bride for a son or vice versa. Parents give particular attention to the working capacity of the groom and bride, rather than the economic situation of the in-law family. Polygamous marriages are also customary among Tharu people, with rich land holders marrying between two and five women.

== Language ==
The language of the recognized indigenous nationality of Rana Tharu is ‘Rana Tharu’. Under the umbrella of the Nepal Rana Tharu Samaj, a protest was held demanding the Rana Tharu language be made one of the official languages of Sudurpaschim Pradesh. In Kanchanpur, mother-tongue education is provided in the Rana Tharu language up to grade three. The Language Commission of Nepal has recommended Rana Tharu as official language in Sudurpashchim Province. Rana Tharu is also spoken in specific areas of Uttar Pradesh, India including the Lakhimpur Kheri district, particularly in Palia Kalan and Chandan Chauki block, situated on the India–Nepal border. Additionally, it is spoken in the Udham Singh Nagar district of Uttarakhand state.

The language has linguistic distinctions with dialects in India and shows lexical similarities with Awadhi as well. Additionally Buksa language, is largely mutually intelligible with Rana Tharu.

Rana Tharu is used in various aspects of life, including at home, with friends, and in religious contexts. It is actively spoken outside the home such as in the workplace and education. The language is widely utilized by all members of the community and coexists with the use of Hindi and Nepali.
