= Nepal Sanskrit University =

Public university in Tulsipur, Dang, Nepal

- नेपाल संस्कृत विश्वविद्यालय
- Former name: Mahendra Sanskrit University
- Type: Public university
- Established: 1986 (40 years ago)
- Budget: Rs. 1.31 billion (US$8.8 million) (2025–26)
- Chancellor: Prime Minister of Nepal
- Vice-Chancellor: Prof. Dr. Bhim Prasad Khatiwada
- Students: 2,100
- Location: Tulsipur, Lumbini, Nepal; 28.09°N 82.35°E
- Campus: 2,530.66 acres (1,024.12 ha); Midsize city
- Website: nsu.edu.np

Nepal Sanskrit University (Nepali: नेपाल संस्कृत विश्वविद्यालय) a university in Nepal. It was established in December 1986 and has its central office at Tulsipur in Dang district of Lumbini Province, Nepal. The university is 13 km away from the city of Ghorahi.

== Academics ==
The university offers Bachelor (Shastri), Bachelor of Education, Masters (Acharya) and Doctoral courses in classical and modern subjects. It offers Bachelors of Ayurvedic Medicine and Surgery (BAMS), and going to start Institute of Sthapatya (IOS) also condensed courses for Ayurvedacharya.

The university has 12 constituent and 13 affiliated Vidhyapeetha (Campuses) around the country.

Inspired by the long unbroken tradition of Sanskrit in Nepal, the university was established for the following purposes:

- To fulfill the need for an autonomous institution for teaching/learning activities and research of Sanskrit at many levels.
- To systematize Sanskrit education up to the highest level in the country.
- To preserve and promote Sanskrit education in sectors of Nepalese society.
- To develop Nepal into a center for learning through Sanskrit education.

NSU offers facilities for degree and non-degree research works based on Sanskrit. It organizes training programs on Vedic and Buddhist teaching and Yoga training.

== Administration ==
The Prime Minister is the chancellor of Nepal Sanskrit University. The pro-chancellor is the Minister for Education. The vice-chancellor is the chief administrator. On 12 May 2002, a fire broke out in the university which caused 27.5 million rupees worth of damage.

== Constituent campuses ==
Currently, there are 14 constituent campuses of Nepal Sanskrit University.

- Pindeshwor Vidyapeeth, Dharan, Sunsari
- BP Koirala Sanskrit Vidyapeeth, Solukhumbu
- Janakhajari Vidyapeeth, Janakpur, Dhanusha
- Yjnayavalkya Lakshminarayan Vidyapeeth, Matihani, Mahottari
- Balmiki Vidyapeeth, Kathmandu
- Bhanu Sanskrit Vidyapeeth, Tanahun
- Kalika Sanskrit Vidyapeeth, Nawalpur
- Binduwasini Vidyapeeth, Kaski
- Central Ayurveda Vidyapith, Beljhundi, Dang
- Patanjali Ayurveda Medical College and Research Centre, Dhulikhel
- Janata Vidyapith, Dang
- Bishow Bidhalaya Vidyapith, Beljhundi, Dang
- Harihar Sanskrit Vidyapith, Argakhanchi
- Sharada Vidyapith, Mahandranagar, Kanchanpur
- RuRu Sanskrit Vidyapith, Gulmi
- Radhadamodar Sanskrit Vidyapith, Syangja
