= Ambikeshwori Temple =

Hindu temple in Nepal

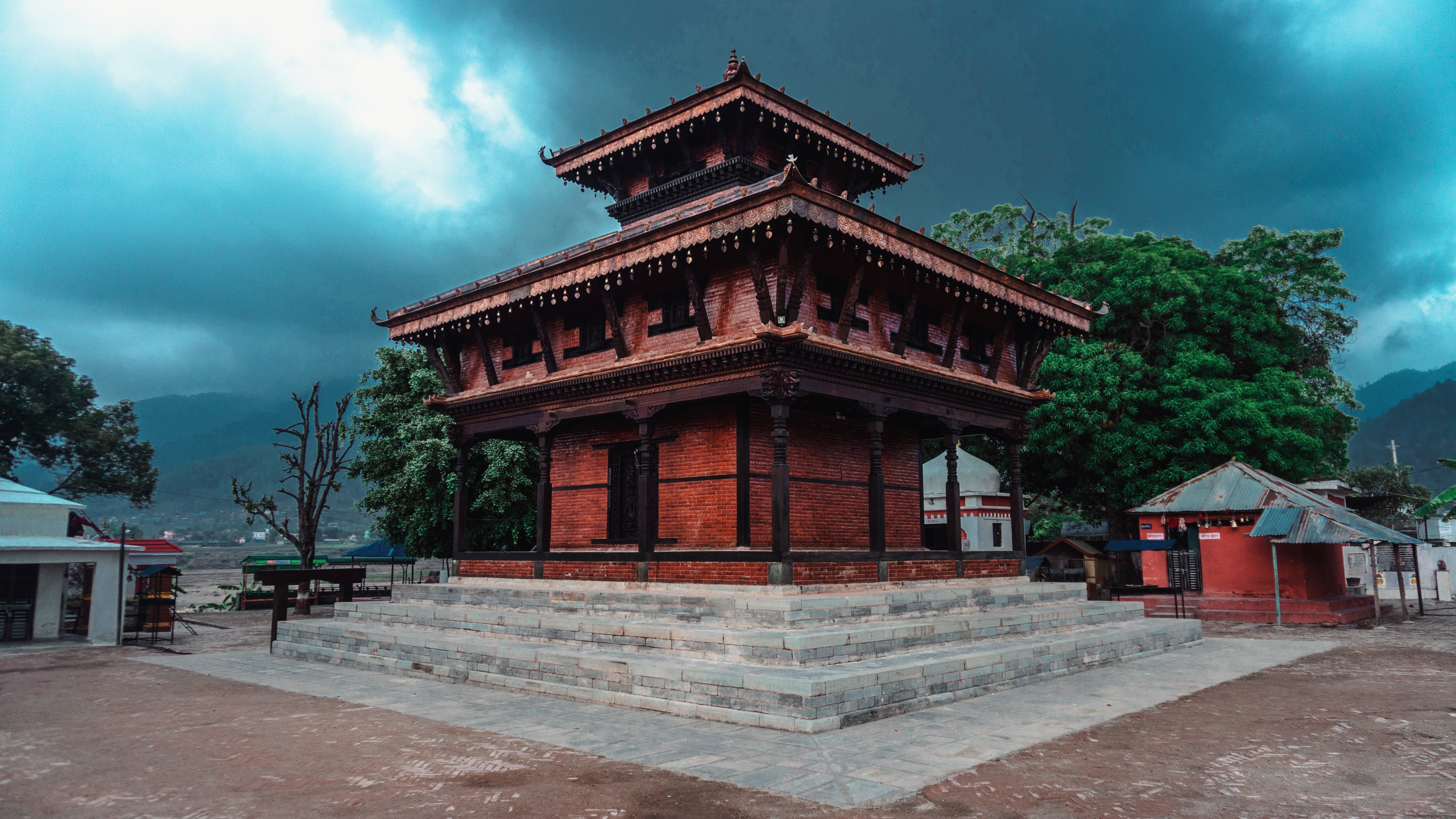
- A view of Ambikeshwori Temple

- Location in Nepal

Religion
- Affiliation: Hinduism
- District: DANG
- Deity: Shiva; Sati Devi
- Festivals: Shivaratri, Teej, Balachaturdasi, Fulpati, Sarawati Puja

Location
- Location: Ghorahi
- Country: Nepal
- Coordinates: 28°2′42″N 82°29′16″E

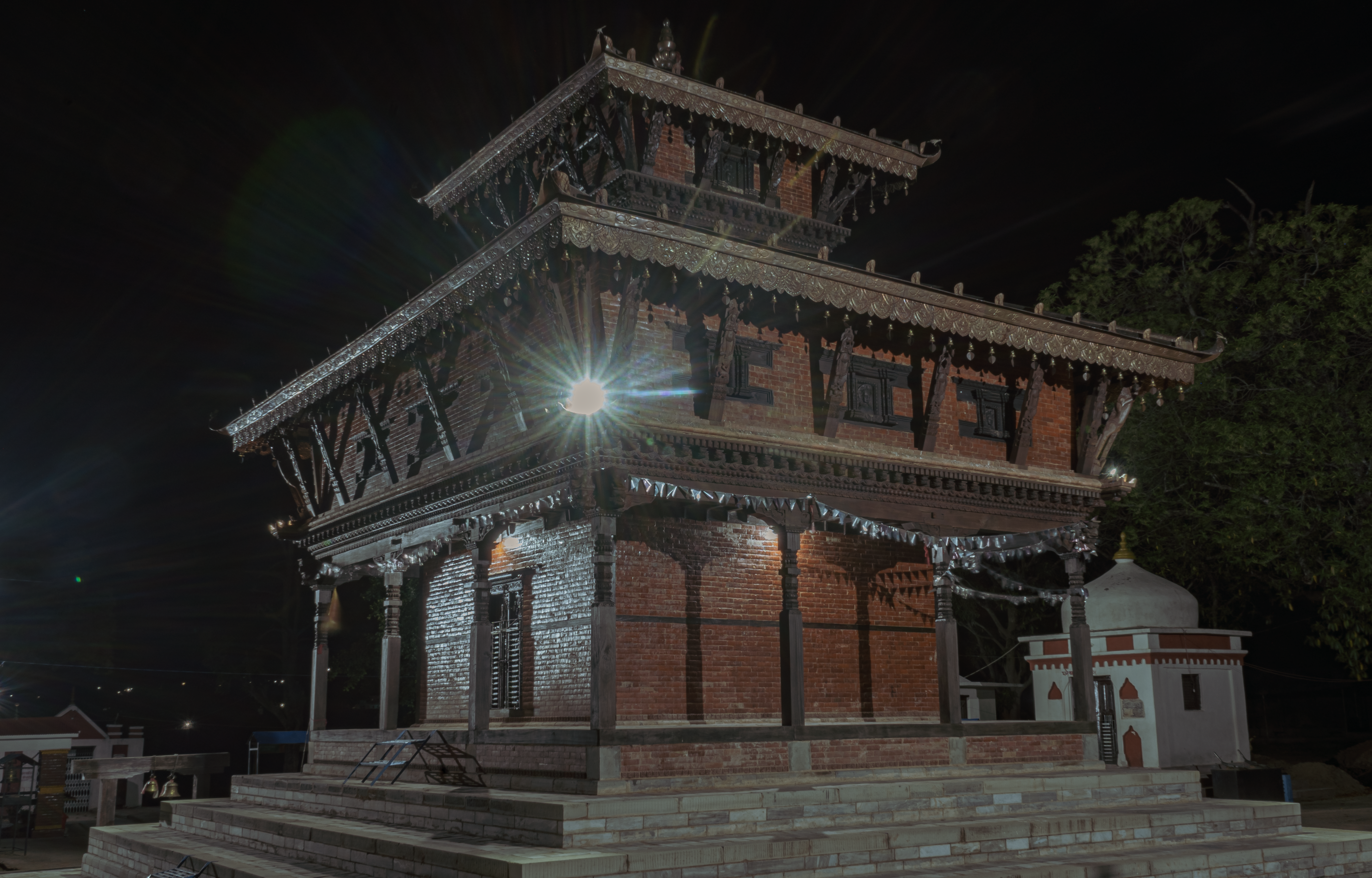

Ambikeshwori Temple (Nepali: अम्बिकेश्वरी मन्दिर) is the highly religious centre of the attraction of people in the Mid-Western Region of Nepal, South Asia. This temple lies in the lap of largest valley of South-Asia, Dang Valley. Lying just at the eighteen ward of Ghorahi sub-metropolitan city of Dang district, it is accessible to many of the pilgrims. The temple also known as ‘Maiko Than’ (Mother's Place) is situated to the north of Ghorahi one and half kilometers away on bank of Katuwa Khola. This Shakta pitha is supposed to have emerged due to the falling of right ear of Satidevi according to the Swasthani Purana. This temple is the most popular Shakta pitha of Dang.

Every year a great number of people gather during Dashain, "Phulpati"and "Kalratri". The temple is one of the famous temples of Western Nepal. Its history is mentioned in the famous Hindu religious book Swosthani.

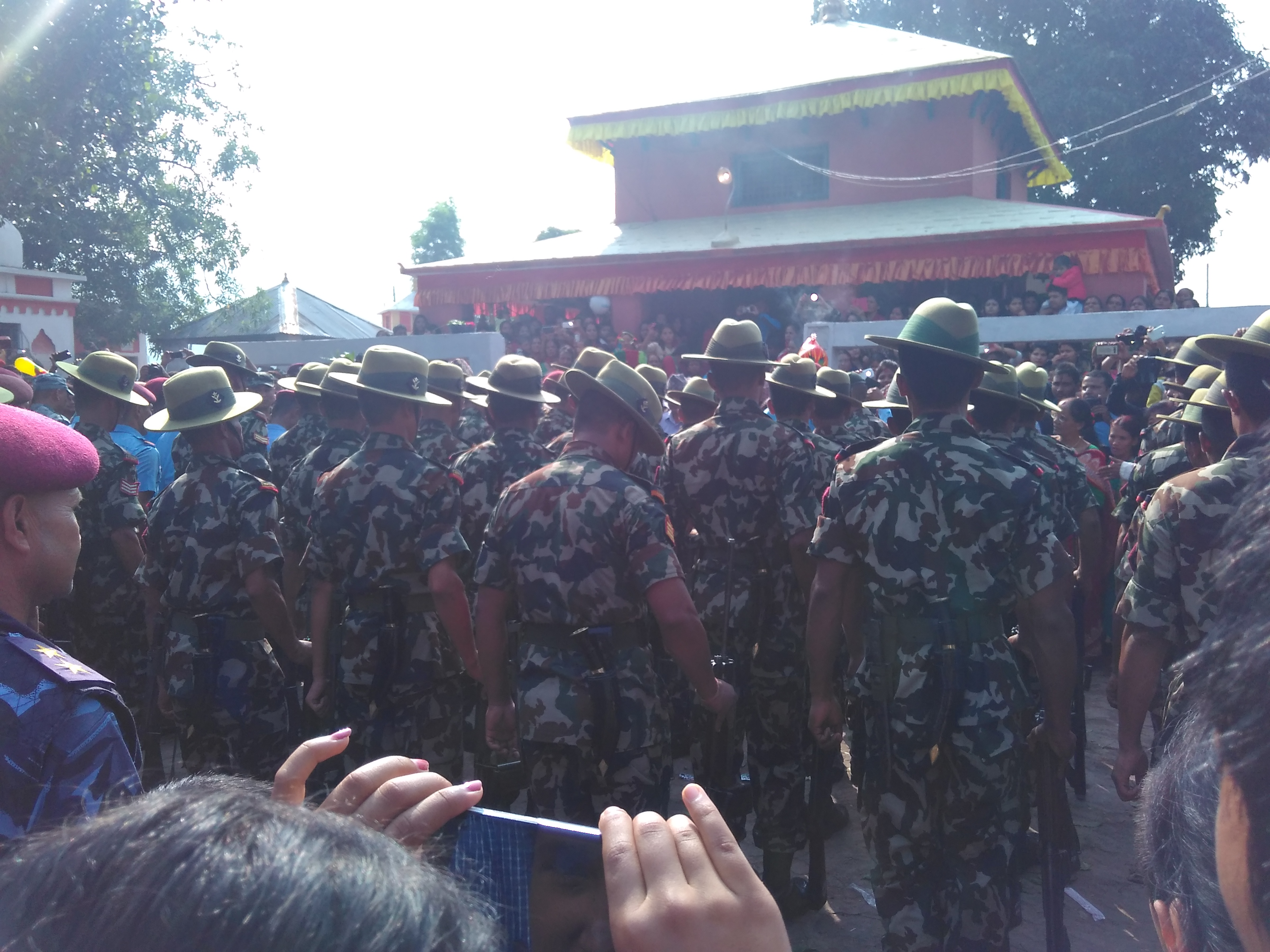
Nepal Army devoting Fulpati in Ambikeshori Temple Area during Dashain
