= Purnagiri Temple =

Hindu temple and Shakti Peetha in Uttarakhand, India

- Idol of Maa Purnagiri

- Location in Uttarakhand, India Purnagiri (India)

Religion
- Affiliation: Hinduism (Shaktism)
- District: Champawat
- Deity: Maa Purnagiri (Sati / Annapurna)
- Governing body: Purnagiri Mandir Samiti; Zila Panchayat Champawat

Location
- Location: Annapurna peak near Tanakpur
- State: Uttarakhand
- Country: India
- Coordinates: 29.4073°N 80.0759°E

Architecture
- Established: 1632
- Elevation: 3,000 ft (914 m)

Website
- champawat.nic.in/tourist-place/purnagiri/

Purnagiri Temple is a Hindu temple and one of the Shakti Peethas located atop the Annapurna peak near Tanakpur in the Champawat district of Uttarakhand, India. The shrine is also known as Maa Purnagiri Temple, Purnagiri Dham and Punyagiri, and is counted among the 108 Siddha Peethas. Situated on a steep ridge along the right bank of the Sharda River near the India–Nepal border, it serves as a major Shakta pilgrimage centre in northern India. Daily temple rituals are managed by the local priesthood and the Purnagiri Mandir Samiti, while annual fair arrangements are overseen by the Zila Panchayat of Champawat. Together, the annual Purnagiri Mela and Navaratri festivals attract over 3 million pilgrims each year.

== Religious significance ==
=== Shakti Peetha and Tantric tradition ===
In Shaktism Purnagiri is considered a Shakti Peetha and a temple dedicated to Mahakali who is worshipped locally as Purneshwari. Early texts such as the Kalika Purana and the Hevajra Tantra list Purnagiri among the four primary seats of worship known as Adi Peethas alongside Kamarupa, Jalandhara and Oddiyana. In local Himalayan tradition it is also counted among the four Giri or hill shrines located in the four directions along with Mallika Giri, Kalika Giri and Hamla Giri.

=== Legends ===
According to Hindu mythology Daksha Prajapati organized a yagna without inviting his daughter Sati and her husband Shiva. Sati attended the ceremony anyway and entered the sacrificial fire after Daksha insulted Shiva. In grief Shiva carried her body and began the Tandava dance. To stop him Vishnu used his Sudarshana Chakra to cut Sati's body into 51 parts. Local belief holds that her navel fell on the Annapurna peak and made the site a Shakti Peetha. Another local story mentions three demons named Tunna, Shumbha and Nishumbha who troubled the region. When the gods prayed for help the Goddess took the form of Mahakali and killed Tunna on this mountain.

=== Scholarly accounts ===
In his book The Śākta Pīṭhas historian Dineshchandra Sircar wrote that early Tantric texts list Purnagiri as one of the four oldest centres of Shakti worship representing the four directions. In his 19th-century Himalayan gazetteer British administrator Edwin T. Atkinson recorded the shrine as Punyagiri. He described it as an important pilgrimage centre in Kumaon along the old trade routes near the Kali River.

== History ==
=== Scriptural traditions ===
In Puranic literature The shrine is associated with the Kumaon Himalayas and the Annapurna peak also called Punya Parvat. Both the Kalika Purana and the Devi Bhagavata Purana associate the hill with the legend of Sati's navel falling at the site. The regional pilgrimage traditions of Punyagiri are also recorded in the Manaskhand section of the Skanda Purana.

=== Historical establishment and literary accounts ===
According to local historical accounts a Brahmin named Shrichand Tiwari from Gujarat sought refuge at the court of Chand ruler Gyan Chand in Champawat during the Mughal period. After receiving a command from Maa Purnagiri in a dream Tiwari established regular worship at the hilltop shrine in 1632. In the early 20th century hunter-naturalist Jim Corbett wrote about the shrine in his book The Temple Tiger and More Man-Eaters of Kumaon. In the chapter titled "The Talla Des Man-Eater" Corbett described the pilgrimage rituals at the lower and upper shrines, the steep cliff face leading to the sanctum and local accounts of mysterious votive lights appearing on the mountain at night.

=== Modern developments ===
In September 2015 the state disaster management department initiated a geological study and slope-stabilisation project to treat rock cracks and reduce landslide risks on the Purnagiri hillside. The Uttarakhand Disaster Recovery Project subsequently selected the Greek consultant firm Gndestru along with Indus and Omikaron to prepare a detailed project report and stabilize the leaning mountain slope. In March 2023 the Uttarakhand government included Purnagiri Temple among more than 60 temples of Kumaon under the Manaskhand Mandir Mala Mission for infrastructure upgrades and road expansion. In March 2025 the state government approved plans to develop permanent facilities at the shrine to support year-round pilgrimage alongside expanding multi-level parking facilities in Champawat and constructing an inter-state bus terminal in Tanakpur. Between October 2025 and February 2026 the state government launched the first phase of the Sharda River Corridor project across nearly 200 km^{2} (77 sq mi) of Champawat district. Managed by the Uttarakhand Infrastructure and Industrial Development Board the corridor connects Purnagiri and Mata Rankochi across revenue areas including Danda and Chuka and encompasses the redevelopment of Sharda Ghat, multi-storey parking facilities and a helipad at Chuka. Additional permanent infrastructure projects were initiated in March 2026 and the renovated temple complex was formally inaugurated on 16 November 2026.

== Sanctum and pilgrimage traditions ==
=== Sanctum and rituals ===
The main sanctum sits on a narrow rocky ledge high on the Annapurna peak overlooking the Sharda River valley. Devotees visit the temple throughout the year often tying a sacred thread known as raksha sutra on the premises and returning to untie it once their wishes are fulfilled. Animal sacrifice was historically practiced at the shrine until administrative intervention prohibited the custom after which devotees shifted to offering coconuts as a symbolic sacrifice. During the fair season groups of pilgrims travel on foot carrying ceremonial palanquins called dolas while singing devotional hymns. Families also perform the mundan first head-shaving ceremony for children in the fair complex.

=== Associated shrines ===
- Baba Bhairavnath Temple: Before ascending to the main sanctum pilgrims stop at the shrine of Baba Bhairavnath revered as the guardian deity who grants permission to enter the upper shrine.
- Jhootha Mandir: Located along the trek route this shrine is linked to the legend of a merchant who promised a golden temple upon the fulfillment of his wish but offered a gold-plated copper structure instead which reportedly became immovable at the spot.
- Kali Temple: Situated along the upper ascent toward the main temple Kalika Mandir serves as a halt for pilgrims and marks the upper terminal point of the under-construction Purnagiri ropeway.
- Siddhanath Temple: Following regional tradition devotees cross the Sharda River into neighbouring Nepal to worship at the Siddhanath Temple in Brahmadev and visit nearby Mahendranagar to conclude their pilgrimage.

== Festivals and fairs ==
=== Purnagiri Mela ===
The annual Purnagiri Mela begins the day after Holi and continues until June, lasting between 89 and 109 days. The 2025 edition ran for 93 days. After a two-year suspension in 2020 and 2021 due to the COVID-19 pandemic, the fair resumed in 2022 and recorded roughly 3.5 million visitors. The shrine receives the highest pilgrim footfall in Uttarakhand after the Kumbh and Kanwar Yatra with around 3 million devotees attending the annual fair. Opening celebrations include the traditional Kumaoni Chholiya sword dance and over 100,000 devotees visited on the first day of the 2019 fair. The fair also hosts Kumaoni folk dances, devotional music programmes and stalls selling local handicrafts and textiles.

=== Navaratri celebrations ===
Both Chaitra Navaratri in March–April and Sharada Navaratri attract devotees from Uttar Pradesh, Madhya Pradesh, Delhi, Haryana, Rajasthan, Himachal Pradesh and Nepal. Opening with ceremonial lamp lighting and Vedic chanting, the nine-day Chaitra Navaratri festival alone draws between 300,000 and 400,000 pilgrims.

== Administration ==
=== Priesthood and temple committee ===
Following the establishment of regular worship by Shrichand Tiwari in 1632, hereditary priests from the Tiwari lineage have conducted daily rituals at the shrine. Day-to-day religious ceremonies, sanctum darshan queues and pilgrim coordination are managed by the local priesthood alongside the Purnagiri Mandir Samiti.

=== Mela governance and regional impact ===
During the annual fair season, civil administration is handled by the Zila Panchayat of Champawat in coordination with the district administration and the Purnagiri Mandir Samiti. The Sub-Divisional Magistrate of Purnagiri and Tanakpur serves as the Mela Magistrate, while the Additional Chief Officer of the Zila Panchayat acts as the Mela Officer. Authorities set up temporary medical camps, ambulance services, drinking-water stations, pathway lighting from Kakarali Gate to the main shrine, and sanitation blocks at Thuligad and Boom. Security deployments during the fair include Provincial Armed Constabulary units and State Disaster Response Force teams stationed along the route and at the Sharda and Boom ghats. To manage large crowds and support year-round pilgrimage, the state government initiated a CCTV surveillance control room at Thuligad, a multipurpose administrative building at Selagad, and pumping water schemes at Ladigad and Thuligad–Babligad. In April 2025, the Uttarakhand High Court ordered the installation of CCTV cameras along the Purnagiri pilgrimage route. Following the Haridwar stampede in July 2025, the state government formed a high-level committee to assess carrying capacity and encroachments, alongside introducing mandatory pilgrim registration and phased darshan at major shrines including Purnagiri. The annual influx of out-of-state and Nepali pilgrims supports the local hospitality and transport economy of Tanakpur and sustains cross-border religious ties with Brahmadev in Nepal.

== Geography and access ==
=== Location and topography ===
According to Champawat district records the temple is located at an elevation of 3,000 ft (910 m) above sea level. (Note: Official Champawat district records list the shrine elevation at 3,000 feet (910 m) while some regional news reports mention heights up to 5,500 feet (1,700 m) for the upper ridge of the Annapurna peak.) It is about 20 km (12 mi) from Tanakpur and 92 km (57 mi) from Champawat town. Pithoragarh is around 171 km (106 mi) away. The Kali River flows down from the mountains into the plains near the foothills where it is called the Sharda River. Visitors can see the Sharda River islands and Tanakpur town along with nearby Nepali villages from the top. The historic Buram Deo Mandi site lies close to the base of the hill.

=== Pilgrimage route ===
Pilgrims travel by road from Tanakpur to Thuligad. During the peak fair season shuttle taxis also run up to the Bhairav temple area. From the roadhead a 3 km (1.9 mi) uphill footpath climbs through Bans ki Charhai to Awalakhan or Hanuman Chatti. The path then passes Tanki and Tunyas to reach the main sanctum. Trekking trails along the Kali River also connect this area toward Tamli and Jhulaghat.

Key stages along the Purnagiri pilgrimage route
Stage	Location / elevation	Significance
Tanakpur	20 km (12 mi) from shrine	Base town and nearest railway station
Thuligad	Base roadhead	Main entry point with sanitation facilities and CCTV control centre
Hanuman Chatti or Awalakhan	Mid-route ascent	Viewpoint of Punya Parvat and lower terminal of the Purnagiri ropeway
Baba Bhairavnath Temple	Upper approach	Guardian shrine visited before the final climb
Main Sanctum at Annapurna Peak	3,000 ft (910 m) elevation	Main Shakti Peetha shrine above the Sharda valley
Siddhanath Temple at Brahmadev	Across Sharda River in Nepal	Final shrine visited after Purnagiri darshan

=== Ropeway ===
A ropeway is being built between Hanuman Chatti and the Kali Temple to help elderly and disabled pilgrims. The contract for this project was first awarded in October 2012. Delays in construction led the Uttarakhand Tourism Development Board to issue a contract termination notice in March 2025. Around 25 percent of the work was completed by February 2026. The ropeway is 950 m (3,120 ft) long and climbs a height of 250 m (820 ft). It will have two cabins that carry 65 passengers each and take seven minutes per trip. Once operational it will carry over 800 pilgrims every hour and save about 6 km (3.7 mi) of road travel and uphill walking.

== Transport connectivity ==
- Rail: Tanakpur railway station is the nearest railhead with train services to Delhi, Dehradun, Pilibhit and Bareilly. On 26 February 2021 Railway Minister Piyush Goyal flagged off the daily Purnagiri Jan Shatabdi Express between Tanakpur and Old Delhi. In March 2024 the Tanakpur–Dehradun Weekly Express was launched as the first express train between Tanakpur and Dehradun since independence. It runs through Banbasa, Khatima, Pilibhit, Bareilly, Chandausi, Moradabad, Najibabad, Laksar and Haridwar.
- Air: Pantnagar Airport in Udham Singh Nagar district is the nearest domestic airport. Naini Saini Airport in Pithoragarh is about 168 km (104 mi) away.

== Incidents ==
- 18 May 2018: Eleven pilgrims from Bareilly district walking in a procession with palanquins toward the temple were killed and 19 were injured when a speeding dumper truck hit them at Bichai near Tanakpur on National Highway 125.
- 17 March 2021: The Purnagiri Jan Shatabdi Express ran backwards for over 20 km (12 mi) on the Khatima–Tanakpur section after hitting cattle and stopped safely without injuries. The loco pilot and guard were subsequently suspended.
- 18–19 October 2021: Following heavy rainfall and landslides across Champawat district, police rescued around 200 pilgrims stranded on the temple route and authorities temporarily suspended trekking.
- 24 March 2023: Five devotees died when a bus ran over pilgrims waiting at a stop in Thuligad during the Navaratri rush.
- 26 May 2024: Eleven devotees from Sitapur district travelling to Purnagiri were killed and ten were injured when a ballast-loaded truck overturned onto their parked bus at a dhaba in Khutar in Shahjahanpur district of Uttar Pradesh.
- 9 August 2024: Two devotees were killed and five were injured after an SUV carrying pilgrims to Purnagiri Dham was swept away in the flooded Kirauda stream during heavy rains.

== See also ==
- Shakti Peetha
- Hindu temples in Uttarakhand
- Champawat district

== Bibliography ==
- Atkinson, Edwin T. (1884). The Himalayan Districts of the North-Western Provinces of India. Vol. II. Allahabad: North-Western Provinces and Oudh Government Press.
- Corbett, Jim (1954). The Temple Tiger and More Man-Eaters of Kumaon. Oxford University Press.
- Farrow, G. W.; Menon, I. (1992). The Concealed Essence of the Hevajra Tantra with the Commentary Yogaratnamala. Motilal Banarsidass.
- Pande, Badri Datt (1993) [1937]. History of Kumaun: English Version of "Kumaun Ka Itihas". Vol. 2. Almora: Shyam Prakashan. ISBN 978-81-85865-01-0.
- Sircar, Dineshchandra (1998) [1948]. The Śākta Pīṭhas (2nd ed.). Delhi: Motilal Banarsidass. ISBN 978-81-208-0879-9.
