= Tharu languages =

Indo-Aryan language group of Nepal and India

Tharu
- थारु, थरुवा, थरुहट
- A Tharu traditional healer describing local medicinal plants in Saptariya, a Tharu language
- Pronunciation: (pronounced [tʰaru])(Tharu)
- Native to: Nepal, India
- Region: Terai
- Ethnicity: Tharu
- Native speakers: 1.7 million in Nepal (2021 census); 370,000 or more in India (1997–2007)
- Language family: Indo-European: Indo-Iranian; Indo-Aryan; Eastern; Bihari; (Unclassified); Tharu
- Dialects: Rana Tharu; Sonha Tharu; Kochila Tharu; Kathariya Tharu; Dangaura Tharu; Chitwania Tharu
- Writing system: Devanagari

Official status
- Official language in: Nepal: Lumbini Province; Sudurpashchim
- Recognised minority language in: India: Uttarakhand; Uttar Pradesh

Language codes
- ISO 639-3: Variously: thl – Dangaura Tharu tkt – Kathariya Tharu thr – Rana Tharu the – Chitwania Tharu thq – Kochila Tharu tkb – Buksa soi – Sonha
- Glottolog: thar1284
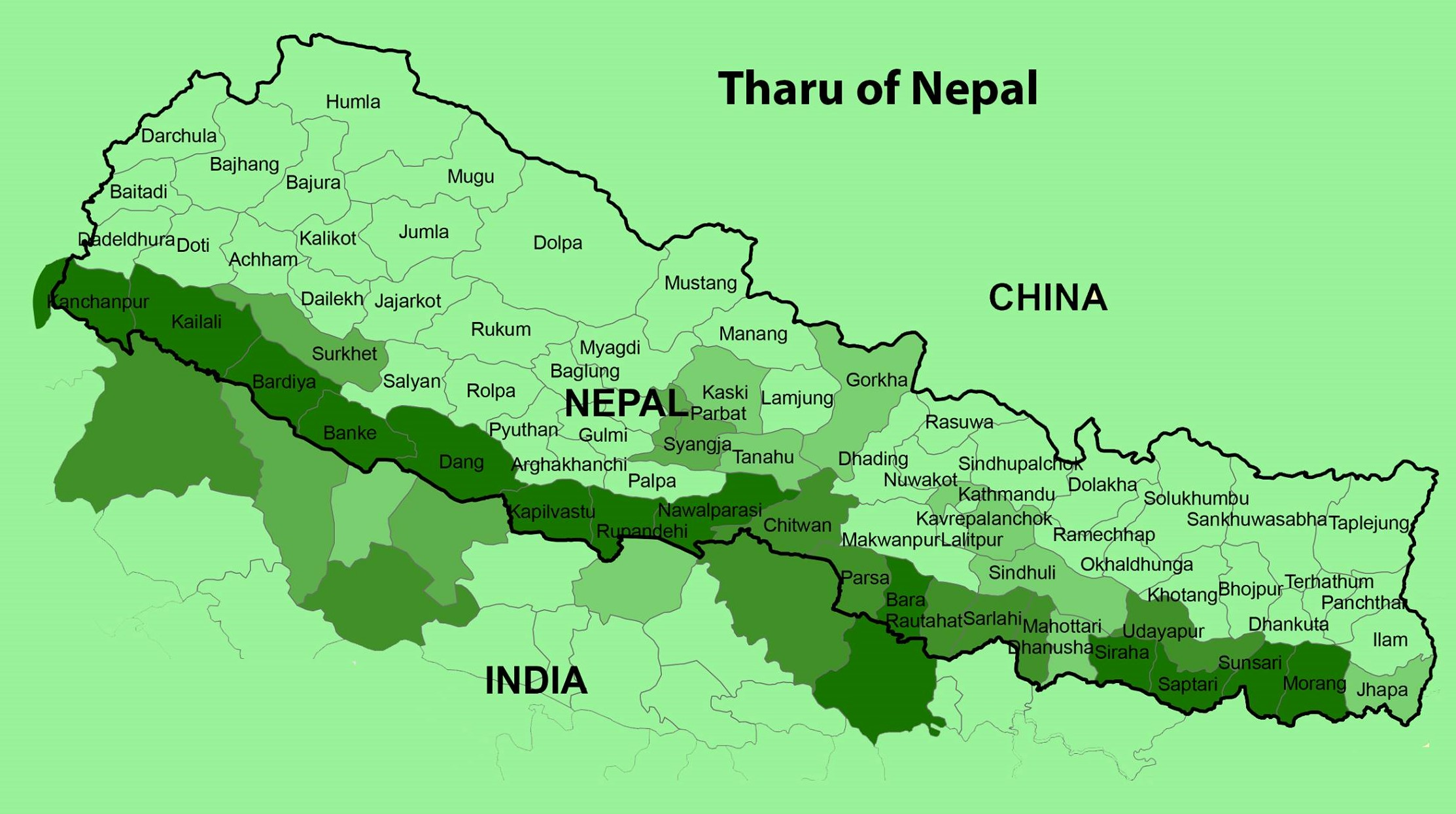
- Regions in Nepal and India with significant Tharu population

The Tharu (Tharu: थारु, (pronounced [tʰaru]), Hindi: थरुवा) or Tharuhat (Nepali: थरुहट) languages are any of the Indo-Aryan languages spoken by the Tharu people of the Terai region in Nepal, and neighboring regions of Uttarakhand, Uttar Pradesh and Bihar in India.

Tharu languages are spoken in the Tharu community. These languages are similar to other neighboring languages. Tharu language is one of the major languages spoken in Nepal.

Although their own precise classification within Indo-Aryan remains uncertain, Tharu languages have superficial similarities with neighbouring languages such as Kumaoni, Awadhi, Maithili, Bengali, Rajbanshi and Bhojpuri. The lexicon of certain Tharu households is indicative of an archaic, 'indigenous' substratum, potentially predating both Sino-Tibetan or Indo-Aryan settlement. Tharu languages appear to be transitional within the context of Indo-Aryan.

== Languages and dialects ==
Tharu communities in different parts of Nepal and India do not share the same language like the other ethnic groups as it varies between the eastern, central and western Terai. There are various Tharu languages spoken by the several endogamous subgroups of Tharu that are scattered over most of the Terai region. Lexical similarity between various Tharu languages varies between 81% and 51% depending upon the Tharu language.

=== Western Tharu languages ===
Dangaura and Kathariya Tharu are mutually-intelligible Tharu variants spoken west of the Gandaki River, by approximately 1.3 million people. Furthermore, an additional variant of Tharu, known as Sonha, is largely mutually intelligible with Dangaura.

Rana Tharu and Buksa are mutually-intelligible Tharu variants spoken by approximately 250,000 people west of Karnali river and in the Indian states of Uttrakahand and Uttar Pradesh. It sounds similar to Western Hindi and Awadhi. The Nepal Charter dated 18 May 2020 lists Rana Tharus as a distinct ethnic group and their language as a distinct language.

=== Central Tharu languages ===
Chitwania Tharu also known as Lalpuriya Tharu, Madhya Ksetriya Tharu or Central Tharu is spoken by approximately 250,000 speakers east of the Gandaki River, in and around the Chitwan Valley. Certain Chitwania variants appear to have considerable lexical similarities with Manchad, a Sino-Tibetan language.

=== Eastern Tharu languages ===
A riddle in Eastern Tharu language.

Kochila Tharu also called Morangiya, Saptariya Tharu, Madhya-Purbiya Tharu or Mid-Eastern Tharu is a diverse Tharu variant, spoken by approximately 250,000 people, in regions of eastern and central Nepal. Kochila Tharu communities are not found in isolation, but live in districts intermixed with speakers of other languages. “In contrast with western Terai where the Tharus are the only and dominant ethnic minority, the eastern – especially the far eastern – Terai is inhabited by several ethnic groups with very different linguistic affiliation”. Kochila has three main dialects spoken throughout mid-central and eastern Nepal which are Western Kochila, Saptariya Kochila and Morangiya Kochila on the basis of their intelligibility.

Bhuti Devi from Hasanpur Village in Sunsari District shares her experiences inking tattoos

== Official Status ==
Tharu language is the fourth most commonly spoken language of Nepal accounting for 5.88% of total population of Nepal as per the 2021 census. According to The Constitution of Nepal 2015 (2072 B.S.) all native languages spoken in Nepal are National languages of Nepal including Tharu. The Language Commission of Nepal has recommended Tharu be made an official administrative language in Lumbini and Sudurpaschim Province. The commission has also recommended Tharu be made the additional official language in all the provinces of Nepal i.e Bagmati, Koshi, Madhesh, Gandaki and Karnali province for specific regions and purposes in the province. At local level, Tharu has official status in Ghorahi sub-metropolitan city of Dang district.

== Geographical distribution ==
=== Nepal ===
In Nepal Tharu languages are spoken throughout the Terai region from Mechi river in the east to Mahakali river in the west in following districts:

- Koshi Province: Jhapa District, Morang District, Sunsari District and Udayapur District
- Madhesh Province: Parsa District, Bara District, Rautahat District, Sarlahi District, Mahottari District, Siraha District and Saptari District
- Bagmati Province: Chitwan District, Makwanpur District, Sindhuli District and a sizeable population in Kathmandu (Kathmandu District, Bhaktapur District and Lalitpur District)
- Gandaki Province: Nawalpur District and a sizeable population in Kaski District (Pokhara)
- Lumbini Province: Banke District, Bardiya District, Dang District, Kapilvastu District, Parasi District and Rupandehi District
- Karnali Province: Surkhet District
- Sudurpaschim Province: Kailali District and Kanchanpur District

With an increase in internal migrants and international emigration Tharu-speaking people have emerged in every district of Nepal and various countries such as the US, Japan, Qatar, UAE and Australia.

=== India ===
In India Tharu language is spoken in border side areas of Nepal. In the state of Uttrakhand it is spoken in the district of Udham Singh Nagar. In Bihar it is spoken in East Champaran and West Champaran districts. In Uttar Pradesh it is spoken in Lakhimpur Kheri, Balrampur, Shravasti, Gorakhpur, Basti, Bahraich and Gonda districts.

== Phonology ==
The following consists mostly of the Daungara and Rana dialects:

=== Consonants ===
		Labial	Dental/ Alveolar	Retroflex	Post-alv./ Palatal	Velar	Glottal
Stop/ Affricate	voiceless	p	t	ʈ	tʃ	k	
Stop/ Affricate	aspirated	pʰ	tʰ	ʈʰ	tʃʰ	kʰ	
Stop/ Affricate	voiced	b	d	ɖ	dʒ	ɡ	
Stop/ Affricate	breathy	bʱ	dʱ	ɖʱ	dʒʱ	ɡʱ	
Nasal	voiced	m	n		(ɲ)	ŋ	
Nasal	breathy	m̤	n̤			ŋ̈	
Fricative			s				h
Tap	voiced		ɾ				
Tap	breathy		ɾ̤				
Trill	voiced		(r)				
Trill	breathy		(r̤)				
Lateral	voiced		l				
Lateral	breathy		l̤				
Approximant		w			j		

- /n/ can be heard as a palatal [ɲ] when preceding a palatal affricate.
- /ɾ, ɾ̤/ may be in free variation with trill sounds [r, r̤] in the Rana dialect.
- Palato-alveolar affricate sounds /tʃ, tʃʰ, dʒ, dʒʱ/ are heard as alveolar affricate sounds [ts, tsʰ, dz, dzʱ] in the Rana dialect.

=== Vowels ===
	Front	Central	Back
High	i		u
Mid	e	ə	o
Low		a	
Diphthong	əi		əu

- Nasalization also occurs as /ĩ, ũ, ẽ, ə̃, õ, ã/.
- Vowels /i, u, e, a/ are heard as [ɪ, ʊ, ɛ, ɑ] when in lax form.
- /ə/ is heard as [ɐ] when preceding or following velar or glottal consonants.
- /a/ can be heard as [æ] when following /j/ or as [ɒ] when following /w/.
