= Pokhariya =

Pokhariya or Pokharia is a clan of Rajputs in the Uttarakhand state of India. It is an old Rajput (Thakur) clan living in the Garkha region of Pithoragarh district in the Kanalichhina developmental block of Didihat Tehsil. They ruled the region from pithoragarh to Kanalichhina. The Bhandari clan and bisht clan were their soldiers who were benefitted a lot under Pokhariya rulers. Their history traces back to the medieval period. They were primarily from the area now called Pokharan (District Jaisalmer) in modern Rajasthan and belong to the mighty 'Champawat' clan of Rathore dynasty. Pokhariyas have settlements in Mautgoo, Khwankot, Dangti, Dungara, Bijjouri Dokuna, some reside in Nainital district . They have settlements in Mau district of Uttar Pradesh where they are identified as Satpokhariya Thakurs . Bhardwaj is the prevalent gotra in the community.

== See also ==
- Kumauni People
