= Ghorahi =

Ghorahi घोराही
- Sub-Metropolitan City
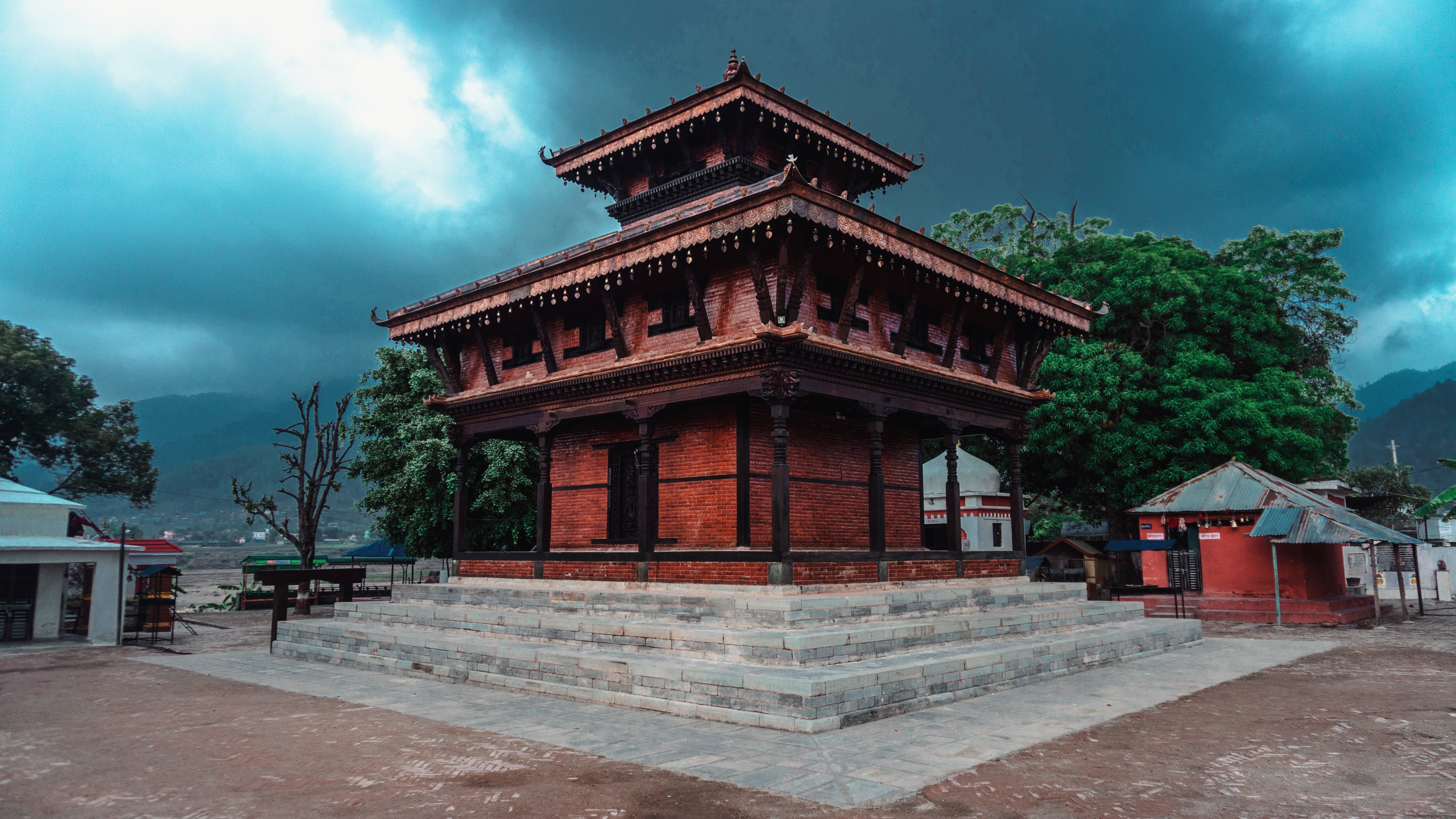
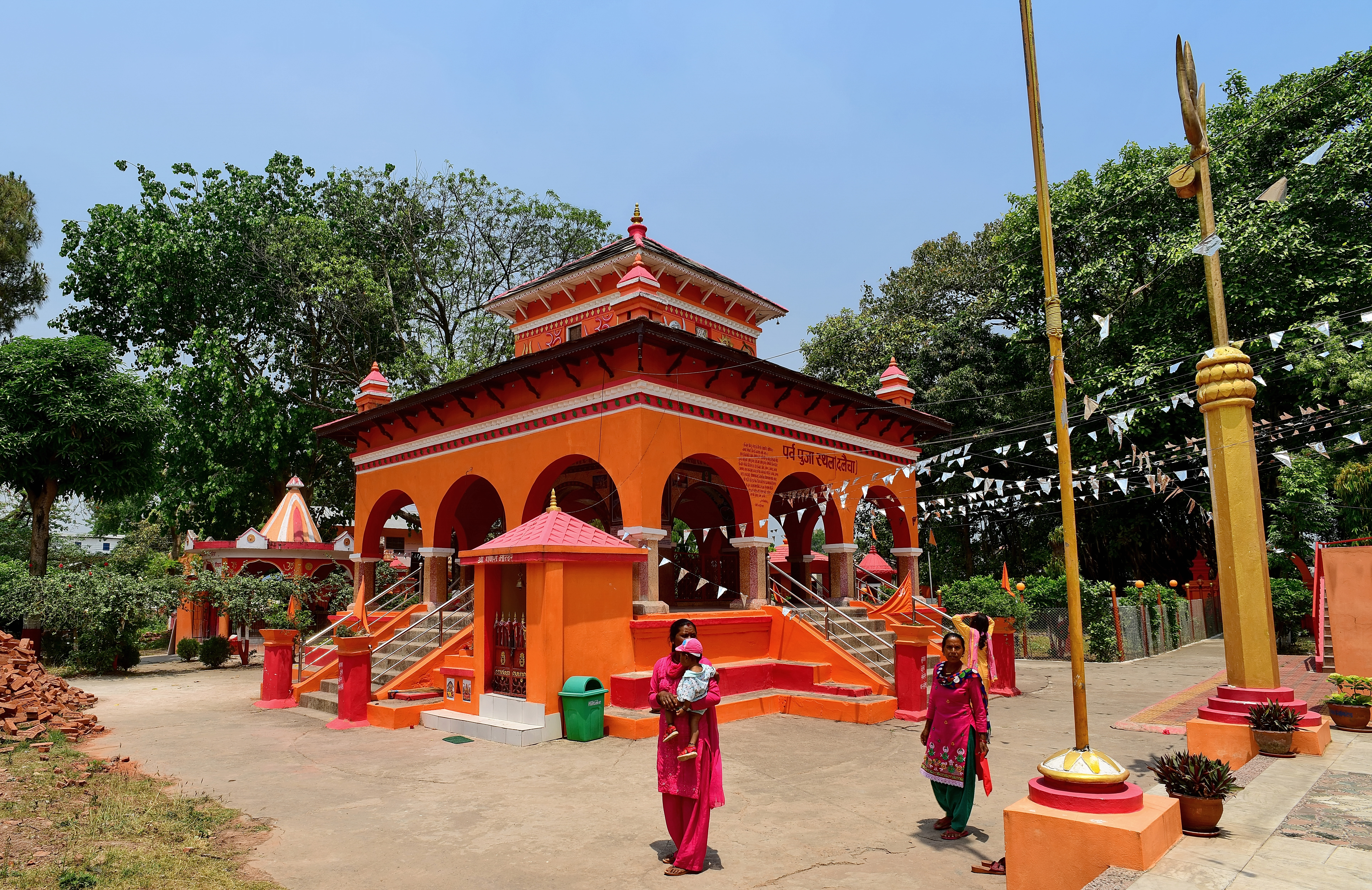
- Ambhikeshwari Mandir Goraksh Mandir
- Nicknames: हरित नगर, महको सहर
- Motto: Clean Green Ghorahi
- Location of Ghorahi in Province Ghorahi (Nepal)
- Coordinates: 28°02′22″N 82°29′09″E
- Country: Nepal
- Province: Lumbini
- District: Dang
- HDI: ▲0.41 Low
- HPI: ▼20.8 Low
- Literacy Rate: ▲73% Medium
- Established: 2034 BS (1977 A.D)

Government
  - Mayor: Naru Lal Chaudhary (NCP)
  - Deputy Mayor: Huma DC (NCP)
  - Executive officer: Rishi Ram Kc

Area of submetropolitan city
  - Total: 522.21 km^{2} (201.63 sq mi)
- Dang District: 2955sq km Dang Valley: 1550 sq km
- Elevation: 600 m (2,000 ft)

Population (2021)
  - Total: 200,530
  - Rank: 7th (Nepal); 1st (Lumbini Province)
  - Density: 384.00/km^{2} (994.56/sq mi)
- Dang District: 548,141; Dang Valley: 351,023

Languages
  - Official: Nepali, Tharu
  - Local: Nepali, Kham Magar, Tharu, Aawadhi
- Time zone: UTC+5:45 (NST)
- Postal Code: 22400 (Ghorahi), 22402, 22407, 22415
- Area code: 082
- Website: www.ghorahimun.gov.np

Ghorahi (Nepali: घोराही उपमहानगरपालिका) is the largest sub-metropolitan city by area and population of Lumbini Province. The city (formerly Tribhuvannagar) lies in Lumbini Province in the Mid-Western part of Nepal. It is the largest city of Dang Deukhuri District of southwest Nepal. Located in the Inner Terai region, it lies 413 kilometres (257 mi) south-west of Nepal's capital, Kathmandu, and is one of the Counter Magnets being developed as an alternative centre of growth to help ease the migration and population explosion in the Kathmandu metropolitan area. It is the largest city of the Rapti Zone and is surrounded by the Sivalik Hills to the south and Mahabharata Range to the north.

Ghorahi is located in the Dang Valley in the foothills of the Himalayas nestled between the Babai River in the east, south, and in the west which ends being the famous Sarayu and Ganges rivers in India. The city is known for its landscape and slightly milder climate and provides a gateway to the surrounding regions of Rolpa, Pyuthan, Salyan and Rukum. It is well-connected and close to tourist destinations such as Bardiya National Park in the west, Surkhet in the north-west, Thawang, Rara Lake, and the Hindu holy lands of Swargadwari and along with the Hindu temples as Pandaveshwor and Ambikeshwori.

It is one of the excellent sub-metropolitan cities based on minimum conditions and performance measurements in the assessment by the local government and financial experts of the commission in the fiscal year 2072/73 V.S. (2015/2016 AD). The city was also the first in the assessment of financial commission by the local body of the Federal Affairs and Local Development Ministry held in the financial year 2067/68 V.S. (2010/11 AD).

It hosts training institutions such as Nepal Sanskrit University, Central Ayurveda College, Rapti Engineering College, Deepjyoti Nursing College, and Mahendra Multiple College. The city population makes a significant contribution to government civil servants. It is home to national factories such as the Ghorahi Cements Ghorahi, Sonapur Cement Factory, Dang Cement Industry. Ghorahi Submetropolitan City Office is locally known as Ghorahi Upa-Mahanagarpalika Karyalaya. Other urban entities involved in civic services and city governance and management include: Tripur Nagar Bikas Samiti, Rampur Gaubikas Samiti, Lakshmipur Gaubikas Samiti, Saudiyar Gaubikas Samiti, and Dharna Gaubikas Samiti. Ghorahi is best known for its high-quality honey and hemp (अल्लो) textiles.

== Geography ==
Ghorahi is the main town of the Rapti Zone and also the headquarters of the Dang district. It is located at an elevation of 2,300 feet (700 m) in the Mahabharat-Chure hill region.

The hills of Dang Valley are part of the Mahabharat and Chure Range.

=== Climate ===
Ghorahi has a dry-winter humid subtropical climate (Köppen Cwa).

Climate data for Ghorahi (Dang District), elevation 663 m (2,175 ft), (1991–2020 normals, extremes 1989–2017)
Month	Jan	Feb	Mar	Apr	May	Jun	Jul	Aug	Sep	Oct	Nov	Dec	Year
Record high °C (°F)	27.5 (81.5)	33.2 (91.8)	36.4 (97.5)	39.5 (103.1)	41.9 (107.4)	41.0 (105.8)	35.3 (95.5)	34.7 (94.5)	34.0 (93.2)	34.0 (93.2)	30.2 (86.4)	29.7 (85.5)	41.9 (107.4)
Mean daily maximum °C (°F)	20.7 (69.3)	23.6 (74.5)	28.7 (83.7)	33.2 (91.8)	33.9 (93.0)	32.7 (90.9)	30.4 (86.7)	30.5 (86.9)	30.2 (86.4)	29.1 (84.4)	25.8 (78.4)	22.3 (72.1)	28.4 (83.1)
Daily mean °C (°F)	13.3 (55.9)	16.2 (61.2)	21.0 (69.8)	25.6 (78.1)	27.5 (81.5)	27.8 (82.0)	26.8 (80.2)	26.7 (80.1)	25.8 (78.4)	22.7 (72.9)	18.4 (65.1)	14.6 (58.3)	22.2 (72.0)
Mean daily minimum °C (°F)	5.8 (42.4)	8.8 (47.8)	13.2 (55.8)	17.9 (64.2)	21.1 (70.0)	22.8 (73.0)	23.1 (73.6)	22.8 (73.0)	21.4 (70.5)	16.3 (61.3)	11.0 (51.8)	6.9 (44.4)	15.9 (60.6)
Record low °C (°F)	−0.1 (31.8)	0.1 (32.2)	4.0 (39.2)	10.5 (50.9)	13.6 (56.5)	16.8 (62.2)	19.5 (67.1)	19.0 (66.2)	15.5 (59.9)	7.0 (44.6)	5.4 (41.7)	0.5 (32.9)	−0.1 (31.8)
Average precipitation mm (inches)	21.6 (0.85)	24.0 (0.94)	20.3 (0.80)	30.0 (1.18)	90.6 (3.57)	249.9 (9.84)	420.9 (16.57)	427.6 (16.83)	233.9 (9.21)	48.4 (1.91)	6.8 (0.27)	6.7 (0.26)	1,580.7 (62.23)
Average precipitation days (≥ 1.0 mm)	2.2	2.4	2.2	2.8	7.2	13.8	21.6	20.7	14.8	3.6	0.3	0.5	92.2
Source 1: Department of Hydrology and Meteorology
Source 2: World Meteorological Organization

== History and prehistory ==
Hand axes and other artifacts dated to early Paleolithic (1.8 million to 100,000 years ago) have been found in alluvial deposits along the Babai River in Dang Valley. Archeologists classify these as Acheulean, i.e. 'second-generation' toolmaking that succeeds the very oldest Olduwan. There are more numerous, less ancient archeological sites dating to the Upper Paleolithic/Late Pleistocene (about 50,000 to 10,000 years ago). These are also along the Babai, as well as in Deukhuri Valley (Rapti River) adjacent and south of Dang Valley.

Throughout historic times, and probably earlier, the Dang and Deukhuri valleys were home to indigenous Tharu people.

The House of Tulsipur ruled one of the largest Taluqs of Oudh, India, which then included the Dang and Deukhuri Valleys. Therefore, it also counted as one of the Baise Rajya (Nepali: बाइसे राज्य; 22 Principalities), a confederation in what became western Nepal. The town shares its name with another Tulsipur in Dang Deukhuri District, Nepal (c. 65 kilometres (40 mi) north); the two towns are linked historically by having the same ruler. About 1760 AD, these kingdoms were annexed by the Shah Dynasty during the reunification of Nepal. Tulsipur lands south of the Siwalik Hills were not taken. Since Dang was somewhat higher, cooler, better-drained and therefore had fewer instances of malaria than most of Inner Terai Valleys of Nepal, it was settled to some extent by Shah and Rana courtiers and other Nepalese. Deukhuri was more of a Tharu enclave until DDT was introduced to control the malaria-bearing Anopheles mosquito in the 1950s.

The municipality was established 29 January 1979 with the amalgamation of Ghorahi VDC and Sewar Bangaun VDC with a combined population of 12,279. It was named Tribhuvannagar Municipality after King Tribhuvan (ruled 1911–1955). After Nepal became a republic in 2008 the name changed back to Ghorahi Municipality.

== Transportation ==
Local transport in Ghorahi city is by bus or private vehicles. Buses ply frequently on the circular road surrounding the city centre. Heavy local transport can be seen between Ghorahi and its major suburbs which include Tulsipur, Lamahi, Dharna, Narayanpur, and Saudiyar. Like any other growing city, Ghorahi is also expanding with new habitats in the vicinity. Transport services in these areas are also expanding rapidly. Tourist taxis are also an option for out-of-town trips. Locals typically traverse the city on foot. Auto rickshaws are also common as in other cities.

=== Road ===
Ghorahi is well-connected by road network to all major cities in Nepal. However, many have been significantly impacted by the rain storms and deteriorated, making travel longer than likely expected. The East West Highway is connected via a spur road to Ghorahi from Lamahi. Rapti Sarbajanik Yatayat, Shikari Yatayat, Ambikeshwori Yatayat and other private bus agencies provide extensive transport around the valley and Rapti region. Government based transport is not available in the city.

Distance between major towns and Ghorahi:

Krishna Sen Icchuk Highway connects Ghorahi to the East West Highway.

Distance between major towns and Ghorahi:

- Lamahi: 35.0 km (21.7 mi)
- Krishnanagar: 106.3 km (66.1 mi)
- Nepalgunj: 152.8 km (94.9 mi)
- Dhangadhi: 298.8 km (185.7 mi)
- Mahendranagar: 334.6 km (207.9 mi)
- Bhairahawa: 162.9 km (101.2 mi)
- Bharatpur: 282.4 km (175.5 mi)
- Kathmandu: 426.6 km (265.1 mi)
- Birgunj: 407.9 km (253.5 mi)
- Dharan: 660.5 km (410.4 mi)
- Biratnagar: 670.7 km (416.8 mi)
- Pashupatinagar: 787.2 km (489.1 mi)
- Jumla: 380.7 km (236.6 mi)
- Pokhara: 308.8 km (191.9 mi)
- Birendranagar: 151.6 km (94.2 mi)
- Janakpur: 518.8 km (322.4 mi)
- Hetauda: 353.8 km (219.8 mi)

=== Air ===
Dang Airport is situated at Tarigaon, 23 kilometres (14 mi) from the city. The airport has infrequent flights to Kathmandu. The nearest major airport is Nepalgunj Airport in Banke District, about 152 kilometres (94 mi) away. A new international level airport construction was proposed by the government in 2010 but it was halted due to political turbulence.

=== Population ===
The submetropolitan city was established with the amalgamation of Ghorahi municipality, Tripur Municipality and surrounding VDCs with a combined population of 156,164. Migration into the city is considered to be very high.

Ward No	Administrative Ward(Previously)	Population (2011 Census)
1	Rampur 5,7,8, 9	5,083
2	Rampur 1,2,3,4,6	7,542
3	Laxmipur 1,2,3,6	6,769
4	Laxmipur 4,5,7,8, 9	9,119
5	Dharna 1 to 9	6,851
6	Saudiyar 1,2,3,4	5,483
7	Saudiyar 5,6,7,8, 9	6,618
8	Tripur 4,11	6,658
9	Tripur 10,12,13	7,434
10	Tripur 1,2,3	10,049
11	Tripur 5.8	7,133
12	Tripur 6.7, 9	999
13	Ghorahi 7.8	7,224
14	Ghorahi 10	11,181
15	Ghorahi 11	19,757
16	Ghorahi 9, 1	6,101
17	Ghorahi 2,3,4	9,300
18	Ghorahi 5,6	9,365
19	Sagha 1 to 9	6,748
Total Population		156,164

== Demographics ==
At the time of the 2021 Nepal census, Ghorahi Submetropolitan City had a population of 200,530. Of these, 72.5% spoke Nepali, 21.2% Tharu, 2.6% Kham, 1.9% Magar, 0.7% Hindi, 0.2% Awadhi, 0.3% Newar, 0.% Urdu and 0.2% Bhojpuri as their first language.

In terms of ethnicity/caste, 22.1% were Tharu, 25.5% Chhetri, 19.4% Magar, 11.4% Hill Brahmin, 7.4% Kami, 3.0% Damai/Dholi, 2.2% Sanyasi/Dasnami, 2.0% Sarki, 1.3% Newar, 1.3% Thakuri, 0.8% Musalman, 0.5% other Dalit, 0.4% Badi, 0.4% Halwai, 0.3% Gurung, 0.2% Gaine, 0.1% Chamar/Harijan/Ram, 0.1% Gharti/Bhujel, 0.1% Kathabaniyan, 0.1% Kori, 0.1% Kumal 0.1% Tamang, 0.1% other Terai, 0.1% Yadav and 0.1% others.

In terms of religion, 95.9% were Hindu, 1.5% Buddhist, 1.5% Christian, 0.8% Muslim, 0.2% Prakriti and 0.1% others.

In terms of literacy, 73.6% could read and write, 1.9% could only read and 24.5% could neither read nor write.

== Education ==
The literacy rate is 73%. Ghorahi is home to Mahendra Multiple College and Nepal's only Sanskrit university Nepal Sanskrit University lies near Beljhundi. The city is being developed as an educational hub for mid-western Nepal.

Recently, The government of Nepal has decided to establish Rapti Academy of Health Sciences, in line with its decision to establish a state-owned medical college in each province. The proposed health academy in Dang will be the fifth one owned by the government after the Institute of Medicine, Patan Academy of Health Sciences, Karnali Academy and BP Koirala Academy. Like in the other four academies for medical education, the prime minister will hold the chancellor's post, while the education minister will be the pro-chancellor.

There is a BBA college established by TU in the premises of Mahendra Multiple Campus. An IOE Engineering campus is under construction.

Some of the notable institutions are

- Dang Valley College.
- Deepjyoti Nursing Campus.
- Deepshikha College.
- Deepshikha Higher Secondary Boarding School.
- Gorkha College.
- Gorkha International Higher Secondary Boarding School.
- Mount View English Boarding School.
- Padmodaya Public Model Higher Secondary School.
- Siddhartha Academy Higher Secondary School.
- Nepal Police School Ghorahi, Dang

== Health ==
A sub-regional level hospital along with a children's hospital, an eye hospital and regional ayurveda hospital serving the people of Ghorag. An important health service the Rapti Academy of Health Sciences has been established and will be operational soon in Ghorahi. Many other private and community level hospitals are providing 24-hour service to the dwellers of Rapti region there. Many private hospitals and nursing homes are also under construction. It also has many clinics with highly experienced and qualified doctors.

Some of the hospitals include:

- Rapti Subregional Hospital
- Umashankarnath Memorial Child Hospital
- Deepjyoti Hospital
- Ghorahi Hospital
- Gorkha Hospital
- Chinari Hospital
- Miteri Hospital
- Dental Clinics
- Buddha Hospital

== Drinking water ==
More than six different local water management committees are active for the seamless supply of water in the region. An equal number of private water suppliers are also supplying deepwater to selected households in different regions. Recently, water industries are also supplying packaged mineral water in the city. Gorkha Hardware a prominent drinking water and irrigation specific hardware through its various works has been playing important roles for the development of drinking water in Ghorahi.

== Sanitation and landfill site ==
Ghorahi Sub-Metropolitan city has won the title of "Most clean and sanitated city" of Nepal many times. It has managed its sanitation project with a landfill site in its 9th ward; Karautee Danda, with the total area of 95 ha (230 acres). Karaute Danda Sanitary Landfill site, owned by the municipal government and located on the western side of the municipality at a distance of 5.4 km (3.4 mi) from the city centre. Karaute Danda Sanitary Landfill Site – Ghorahi.

The LFS is situated in the vicinity of Ghorahi municipality. Specifically, the LFS is in ward 9, approximately 1 km (0.62 mi) outside the urban area of Ghorahi. The total area of the LFS is 20 ha (49 acres) of which 1 ha (2.5 acres) is used for MSW management and the remaining area is reserved for plantations of various trees and other vegetation. The area used for final disposal has recently been increased within the property. The old site for final disposal now serves as an area for plantation. Moreover, on the property, there is a sorting platform on which a unit of nine employees sorts the MSW into paper and plastics. There is also a storage house where these are stored before further distribution (Khanal et al. 2009). A total of 10 t (9.8 long tons; 11 short tons) of waste is produced in the city on a daily basis. Waste produced in the city is collected through one compactor, one tipper, and some rickshaws. A total of thirty people are involved in sanitary field work. It is one of the five municipalities that have managed their Dumping and Sanitary site in Nepal.

== Industrial development ==
Ghorahi has its proposed industrial site in its number 3 and 5 wards with a possibility of industrial development. Dang Industry Commerce Association has started initiating the industrial development in the district. The Industry Commerce Association has said that there is a consensus for making an industrial zone through continuous discussion with the locals and concerned authorities. The land which will be industrialized lies in numbers 3 and 5 wards of the Sub-Metropolitan city. The area of the land to be industrialized is about 500 bighas. Many cement industries are already in operation. This has minimized quantity of cement imported from India. The cement industries like Ghorahi cement industry and Sonapur cement industry have started their production; a few others are under construction. Ghorahi cement industry is supposed to be the largest cement industry in Nepal. Poultry and Ostrich Farms are also operating in the city. Many small scale and medium scale industries related to poultry are running in this region.

== Food and cuisine ==
Dal Bhat is a popular cuisine among most of the people in the city. It is eaten twice a day: once after breakfast and at night.

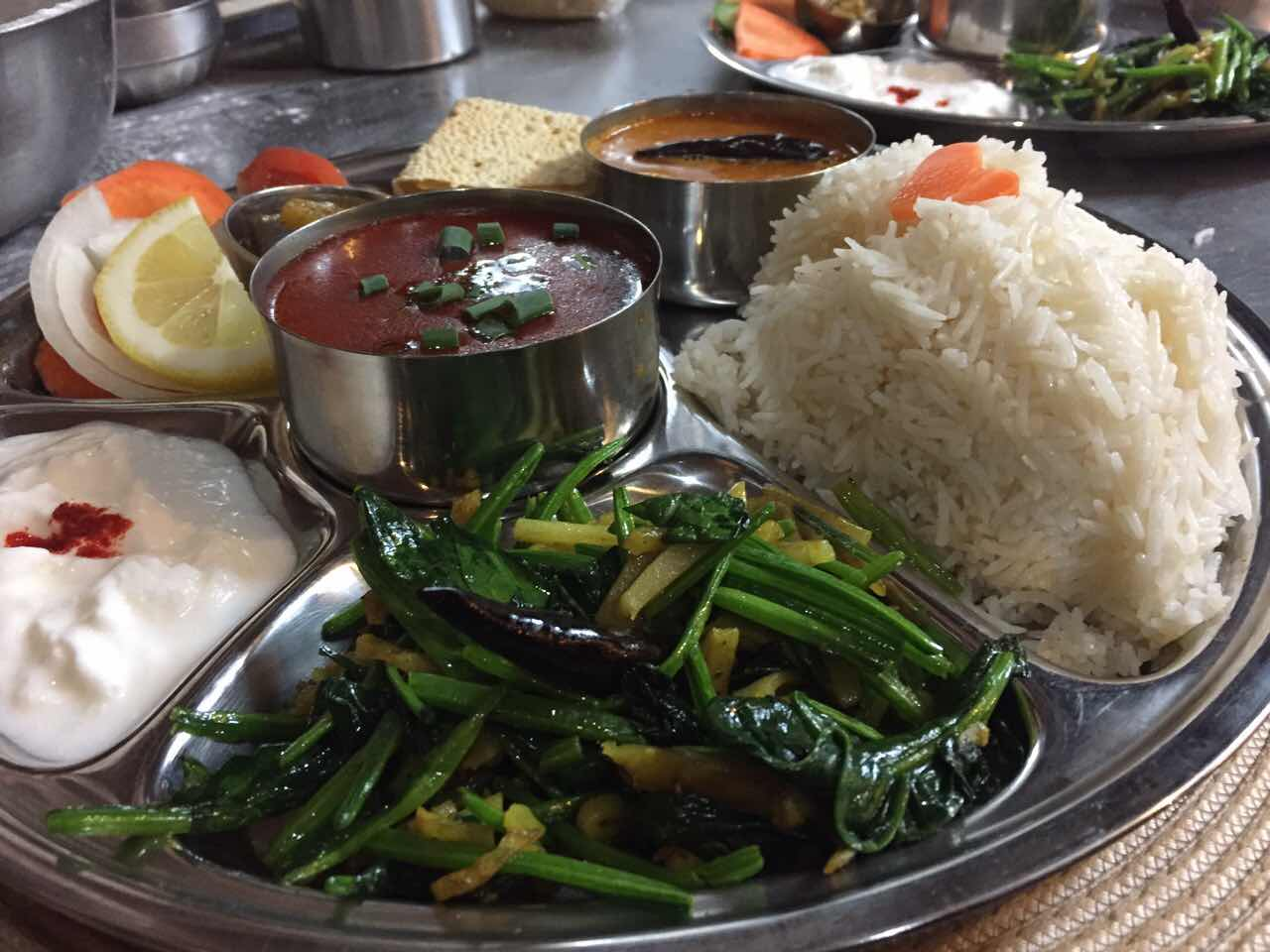
Dal Bhat served in a local restaurant in Ghorahi

Momo, Chowmein, Samosas, and Chaat are famous in the city.

== Media ==
- Newspapers: the people of Ghorahi are served by several daily local newspapers and national newspapers. There are 13 local newspapers in total. Among these are New Yougbodh Daily, Ganatantra Daily, Rapti Post Daily and Gorakshya Daily. National newspapers are also provided to the people on a daily basis. Some of the National newspapers are The Kathmandu Post, Kantipur, Annapurna Post, and the Himalayan Times among others. Several monthly neighborhood papers serve the town.
- Radio: the state-owned Radio Nepal is broadcast on the 98Mhz frequency in the city. Similarly, six private local FM stations are available. They are: Madhyapaschim FM 91.4 MHz; Indreni FM 92.4 MHz; Jharana FM 88 MHz; Radio Pathshala FM 105.8 MHz; Radio Ganatantra Rapti FM 95.1 MHz; Radio Swargadwari FM 102.8 MHz
- Television: Nepal's state-owned television broadcaster, Nepal Television relay station is present near its border, which provides only one free-to-air terrestrial channels. Besides that, a mix of Nepali, Hindi, English, and other international channels are accessible via cable subscription and direct-broadcast satellite services. Ambikeshwori TV and RC Television are local television channels that cover events in the city.
- Internet: Internet facilities are provided by Nepal Telecom, BroadLink, Lumbininet, WorldLink, and Subisu. Nepal Telecom is the leading internet facilities provider. Wi-Fi connectivity is available at many cafes.

== Places of interest ==
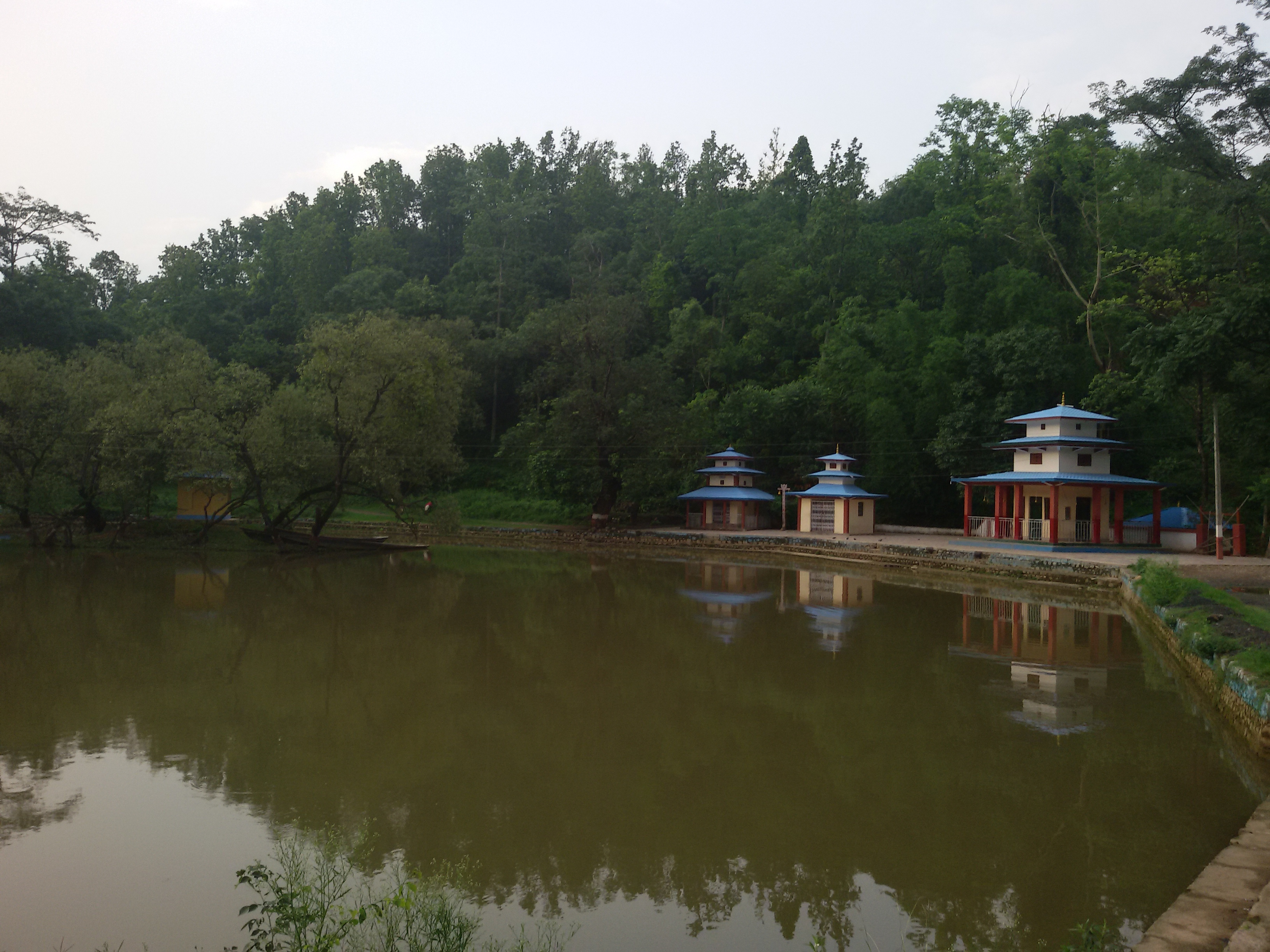
Baraha Temple Area in Dang

- Ambikeshwori Temple: It is one of the famous temples of Western Nepal. Its history is mentioned in the famous Hindu religious book Swosthani.
- Ratnanath Mandir: It lies in the 4th ward of the municipality and is known as Gorakshya Siddha Ratna Nath Mandir. It is one of the historic places of Nepal.
- Barhakune Daha and Baraha Temple: It lies in the 7th ward of the municipality. There is a pond that has twelve corners (angles); hence its name barha kune daha. The Temple of God Bishnu, barah is also an important place for pilgrims in that area, and several temples of Ganesh and Shiva are there. A special fair is organised here during Maghe Sankranti. It is also a tourist spot.
- Pandaveshwor Temple: The management committee of Pandaveshwor temple at Dharpani, Dharna-1, has installed a 41 ft (12 m)-long trishula that weighs 6 T (60,000 G). It is considered to be the largest in the world. It is related to the Pandavas of the famous epic Mahabharata. A special fair is organised during Maha Shiv Ratri. A total of a thousand trees were also planted in the region.
- Panaura Tharu Cultural Museum
- Martyr Lakhan Thapa Magar Memorial Park : It lies in the centre of the city.
- Netralal Abaghi Memorial Park Gulariya
- Jhigaura Sports Stadium

== Dang International Cricket Stadium ==
Dang International Cricket Stadium
- Ghorahi Cricket Ground
- Interactive map of Dang International Cricket Stadium

Ground information
- Location: Ghorahi, Dang, Nepal
- Coordinates: 28.0213°N 82.4703°E
- Establishment: 2018; 8 years ago
- Capacity: 30,000
- Owner: National Sports Council (Nepal)
- Operator: Cricket Association of Nepal
- Tenants: Nepal national cricket team Nepal A cricket team Nepal national under-19 cricket team Lumbini Province cricket team
- End names
- N/A; N/A

International information

Team information
Nepal cricket team
Lumbini Lions
- As of 28 February 2025; Source: espn Cricinfo

Dang International Cricket Stadium (Nepali: दाङ अन्तर्राष्ट्रिय क्रीकेट मैदान), also known as Ghorahi International Cricket Ground, is a proposed international cricket stadium located in Ghorahi. This stadium will be one of the biggest cricket stadiums in Nepal. The capacity of the stadium will have over 30,000 spectators. It is the home ground of Lumbini Lions in Nepal Premier League. Additionally, this stadium is also the home ground of Lumbini Province cricket team and Lumbini Province women's cricket team.

Ghorahi Cricket Ground has been hosting under-16 and under-19 provincial-level tournaments. It has also hosted the Dang Cricket League twice and the Sagarmatha T20 League one time. The Ghorahi Cricket Stadium does not have as much infrastructure as the stadium in Lamahi, but Ghorahi has a good ground capable of hosting big national tournaments.

== See also ==
- Dang International Cricket Stadium
