= Kochila Tharu =

Indo-Aryan language of Nepal

- A traditional healer describing medicinal properties of local plants in Saptariya Tharu
- Pronunciation: pronounced [purbia-tʰaru-bʰasa] (Kochila Tharu)
- Native to: Nepal
- Ethnicity: Lampucchwa Tharu
- Native speakers: 258,000 in Nepal (2003)
- Language family: Indo-European: Indo-Iranian; Indo-Aryan; Eastern; Tharu; Kochila Tharu
- Dialects: Western Kochila; Saptari; Morangia; Sunsari
- Writing system: Devanagari

Official status
- Official language in: Tharuwan of Nepal

Language codes
- ISO 639-3: thq
- Glottolog: koch1247

Kochila Tharu also called Morangiya, Saptari or Saptariya Tharu, Madhya-Purbiya Tharu, (मध्य-पूर्विया थारू) or Purbiya Tharu (pronounced [purbia-tʰaru-bʰasa]) , is a diverse group of language varieties within the Tharu group of the Indo-Aryan languages. The several names of the varieties refer to the regions where they dominate. It is one of the largest subgroupings of Tharu. It is spoken mainly in Nepal with approximately 250,000 speakers as of 2003. In addition to language, cultural markers around attire and customs connect individuals into the ethnic identity Kochila. The Dutch linguist, George van Driem, described Kochila Tharu, as a dialect of the Maithili language and stated that its speakers have been heavily influenced by the culture of Mithila.

Heavily concentrated in the Eastern Terai of Nepal, speakers of Kochila Tharu live in linguistically diverse regions and are generally multilingual (except some elderly female speakers). The language is widely utilized by all members of the community and coexists with the use of Nepali.

Kochila Tharu communities are not found in isolation, but live in districts intermixed with speakers of other languages. Kochila Tharu have superficial similarities with neighbouring languages such as Bhojpuri, Maithili, Bengali and Rajbanshi due to their proximity with these various ethnicities depending upon the districts that they are present.

A 2013 survey by SIL International found that the language was being taught to children as their first language and used conversationally between multiple generations of speakers, characteristics of a "vigorous" language as defined by Ethnologue Expanded Graded Intergenerational Disruption Scale (EGIDS).

Tharu Bhasa Sahitya Kendra is a group dedicated to promoting Kochila Tharu language.

== Dialects and distributions ==
There are 3 main dialects of Kochila Tharu spoken throughout mid-central and eastern Nepal which are into the following varieties due to their intelligibility:

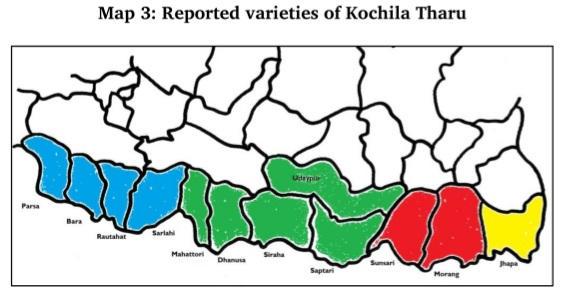
Variant of Kochila Tharu language in Eastern Terai

Western Kochila: 65,000 speakers in Mid eastern Nepal

- Madhesh Province: Bara district, Parsa district, Rautahat district and Sarlahi district

Central Kochila (Saptari or Saptariya Tharu): 140,000 speakers in Eastern Nepal

- Madhesh Province: Saptari district, Siraha district, Mahottari district
- Koshi Province: Udayapur district

Eastern Kochila (Morangiya Tharu): 160,000 speakers in Eastern Nepal

- Koshi Province: Sunsari district, Morang district and Jhapa district

The lexical similarity percentages among the three Kochila Tharu varieties show that the lexical similarity percentages vary from 65% to 73%. Lexical similarity follows a geographic pattern of the central variety having similar results for the eastern and western varieties, while the similarity percentage between the eastern and western varieties is slightly lower.

== See also ==
- Tharu People
