= Rana Tharu language =

Indo Aryan language

Rana Tharu
- राना थारू
- Native to: India, Nepal
- Ethnicity: Rana Tharu
- Native speakers: 230,000 (2003–2021)
- Language family: Indo-European: Indo-Iranian; Indo-Aryan; Eastern; Bihari; Tharu; Rana Tharu
- Writing system: Devanagari

Official status
- Official language in: Tharuban of Nepal

Language codes
- ISO 639-3: thr
- Glottolog: rana1246

Rana Tharu is an Indo-Aryan language spoken by the Rana Tharu people who are part of the Tharu ethnic group in the Sudurpashchim Province of Nepal, specifically in the Kanchanpur district's southern municipalities and Dhangadhi in the Kailali district. Rana Tharu is also spoken in specific areas of Uttar Pradesh, India including the Lakhimpur Kheri district, particularly in Palia Kalan and Chandan Chauki block, situated on the India–Nepal border. Additionally, it is spoken in the Udham Singh Nagar district of Uttarakhand state. It exhibits high intelligibility among its dialects, with reported percentages ranging from 96% to 99%. The language has linguistic distinctions with dialects in India and shows lexical similarities with Awadhi and Buksa as well.

In terms of linguistic features, Rana Tharu follows the SOV (Subject-Object-Verb) word order, uses postpositions, and has noun head final structure. It has two genders, employs content question words in situ, and involves a combination of prefixes and suffixes in its morphology. The language demonstrates ergativity, marking tense with four categories (past, present, imminent future, irrealis future). Additionally, it features passives and voice, lacks tonality, and possesses a phonetic inventory of 28 consonant and 11 vowel phonemes.

Rana Tharu is used in various aspects of life, including at home, with friends, and in religious contexts. It is actively spoken outside the home such as in the workplace and education. The language is widely utilized by all members of the community and coexists with the use of Hindi and Nepali.
