= Buksa language =

Indo-Aryan language of Uttar Pradesh

Buksa
- Bhoksa
- Native to: India
- Region: Uttarakhand
- Ethnicity: Bhoksa people
- Native speakers: 59,000 (2011 census)
- Language family: Indo-European: Indo-Iranian; Indo-Aryan; Eastern; Bihari; Tharu; Rana Tharu; Buksa
- Writing system: Devanagari

Language codes
- ISO 639-3: tkb
- Glottolog: buks1238

Buksa, also known as Buksari and Bhoksa, is an Indo-Aryan language spoken by the Buksa people in parts of Uttarakhand and Uttar Pradesh, India.

Within Uttarakhand, most speakers of Buksa are found in several dozen villages in Udham Singh Nagar district in the south-east of state, mainly in the development blocks of Bajpur and Gadarpur. There are also speakers in a number of villages in the Ramnagar area of Nainital district, as well as in the urban centres of Dehradun, Haridwar and Pauri.

Buksa has no written literature, but there is an oral tradition of folktales and folk songs.

== Bibliography ==
- Pant, Jagdish (2015). "Buksa/Buksari". In Devy, Ganesh; Bhatt, Uma; Pathak, Shekhar (eds.). The Languages of Uttarakhand. People's Linguistic Survey of India. Vol. 30. Hyderabad: Orient Blackswan. pp. 3–26. ISBN 9788125056263.
