= List of Nepalese dishes =

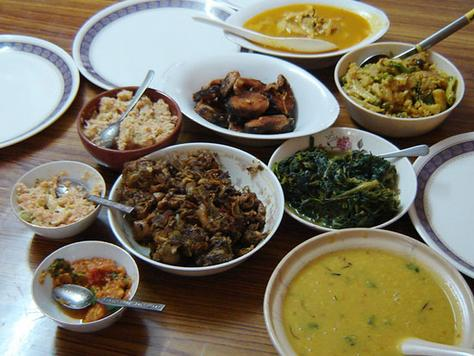
An elaborate Newa meal in Kathmandu

Nepali/Nepalese cuisine refers to the food eaten in Nepal. The country's cultural and geographic diversity provides ample space for a variety of cuisines based on ethnicity and on soil and climate. Nevertheless, dal-bhat-tarkari (Nepali: दाल भात तरकारी) is eaten throughout the country. Dal is a soup made of lentils and spices. This is served over boiled grain, bhat—usually rice with vegetable stew, tarkari. Condiments are usually small amounts of extremely spicy chutney (चटनी) or pickle (achaar, अचार) which can be fresh or fermented. The variety of these is said to number in the thousands. Other accompaniments may be sliced lemon (kagati) with fresh green chili (hariyo khursani). Dhindo is a traditional food of Nepal. It also has a high influence of west and central Asian cuisine.

== Nepali/Nepalese dishes ==
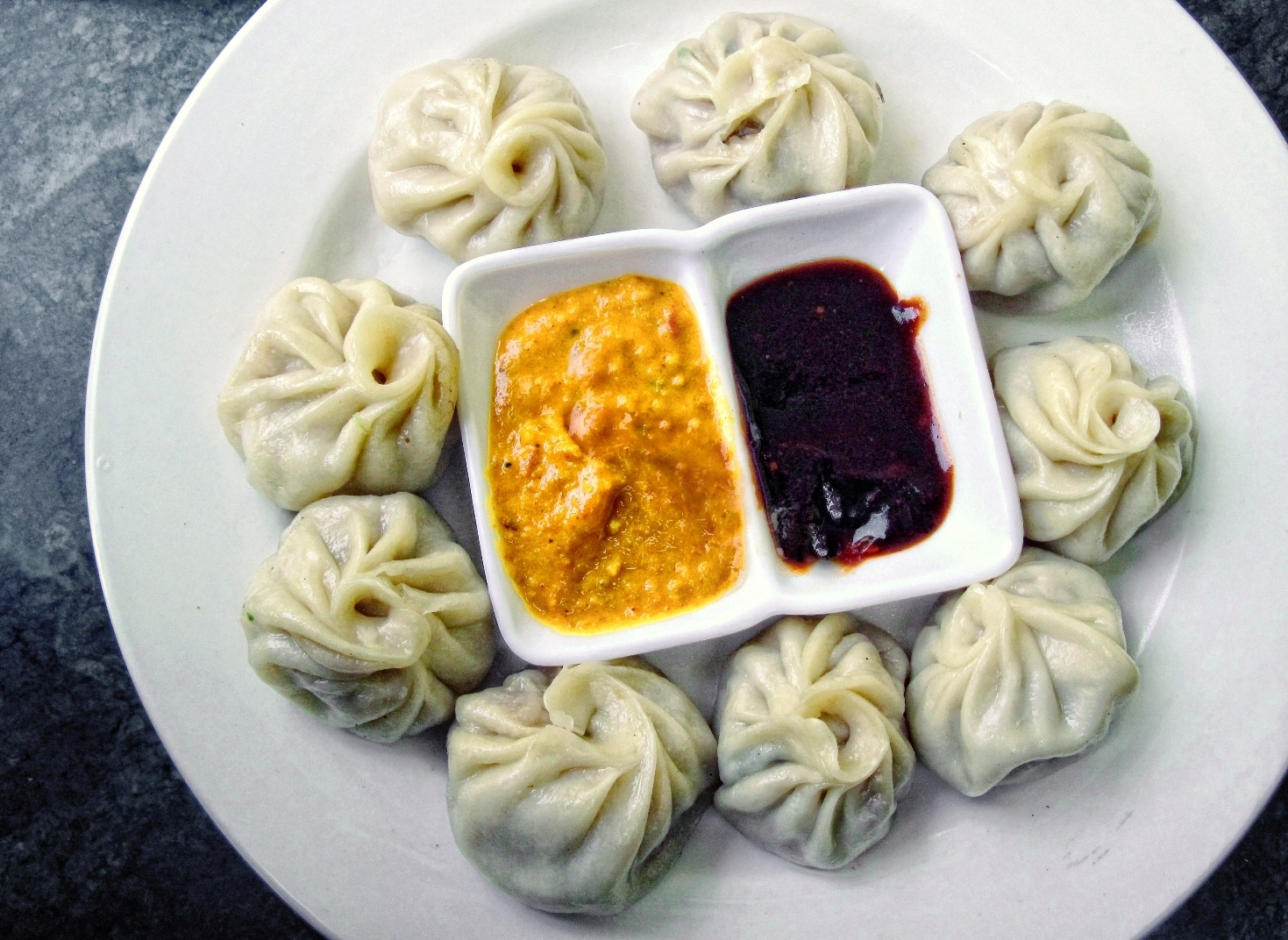
A serving of momo with sesame yellow and red garlic chili sauce in Nepal

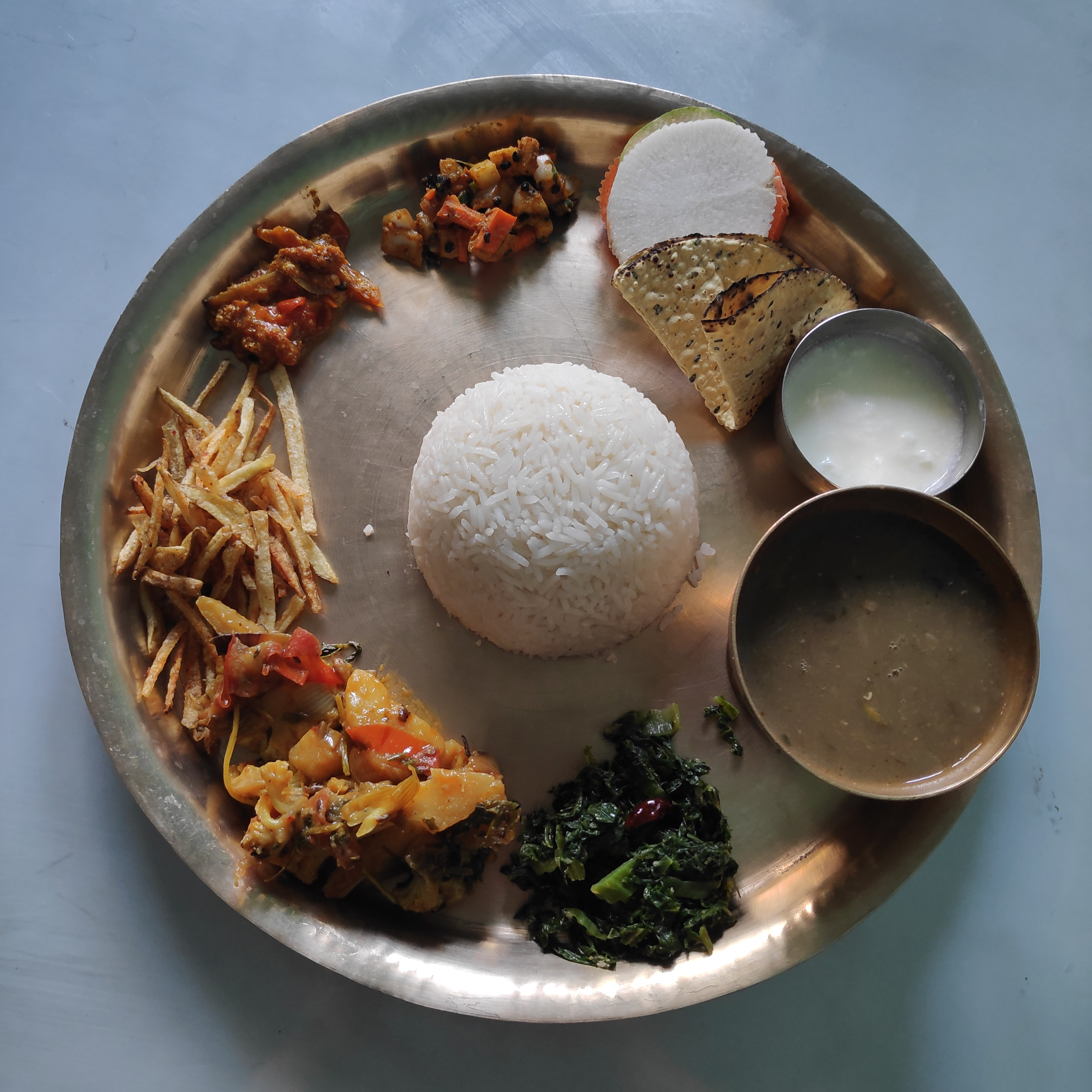
Nepali khana - dal bhat

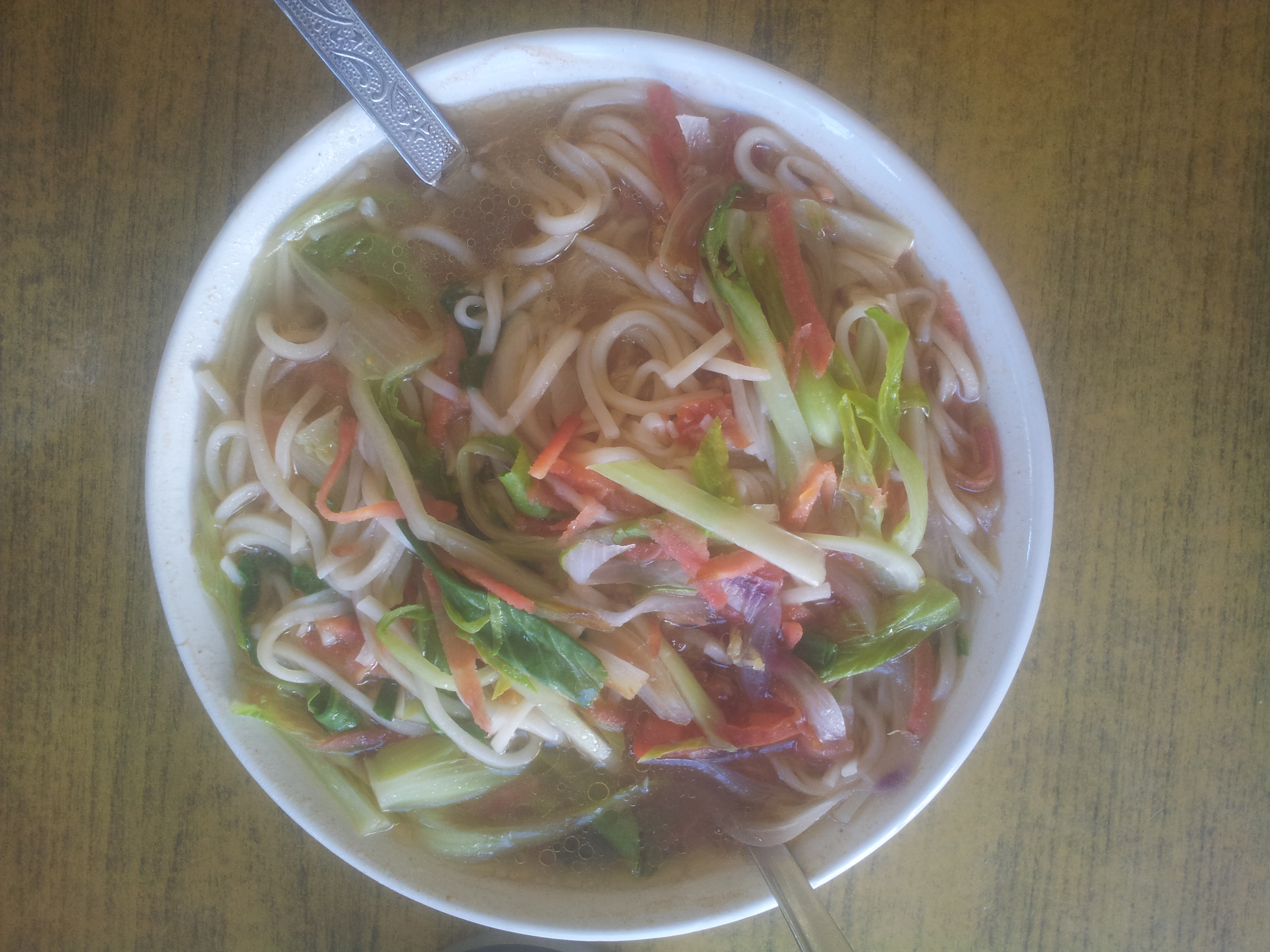
Thukpa

- Aato – made from crushed corn
- Achaar
- Anarsa - Sweet rice fried cookie
- Alu chop - deep-fried smashed potato
- Chiura – flattened rice
- Bambaisan - dessert/sweet made out of milk in Ilam district
- Bara
- Batuk - Fried black lentil doughnut
- Bhatmaas – Nepali name for fried black soybeans
- Buffalo curd – curd dairy product prepared from buffalo milk
- Bhakkha
- Bhatmas sadheko - snacks/salsa made from soybean
- Bhogate sadheko - Pomelo salad
- Bhuja or murai - Puffed rice
- Bagiya - made of rice flour with different kinds of salty or sweet fillings, cooked in boiling water
- Bhuswa - a spherical sweet flour laddoo made during the Chhath festival in Terai region
- Bigauti - sweet made out from cow's colostrum milk
- Bunga ko achar - Salad made from banana flower
- Chauka - flax seed curry
- Chaat
- Chaku
- Chatamari
- Chhurpi
- Chicken curry
- Choila
- Chow mein
- Chuuk - thickened lemon/lime juice by cooking
- Chukauni - yoghurt and potato
- Chunlā
- Chutney
- Curry
- Dal
- Dal bhat
- Dhindo
- Dhikri
- Dhakane
- Daal puri - a traditional snack in Terai region like paratha, made of rice and wheat flour filled with gram pulses
- Fini roti
- Fried cauliflower
- Fulaura - Fried black lentil balls
- Ghiu/Ghee
- Ghonghi
- Gilo roti
- Gundruk
- Haluwa
- Jaaulo
- Kassar - laddu/sweet made from rice flour
- Khalpi - ripened/matured cucumber pickle (fermented)
- Khatte (roasted rice)
- Khajuri - oil-fried cookies
- Kheer
- Khichdi
- Khoa (kurauni)
- Kinema - fermented soybean
- Kodo ko roti
- Kwati
- Khajuriya - like a cookie, dough is fried in oils made during Chhath festival in Terai region.
- Lai - sesame seeds or puffed rice mixed with jaggery syrup and shaped as spherical small balls mainly celebrated on maghe sankranti festival (during February).
- Laping
- Makai ko roti
- Masyaura
- Momo (dumpling)
- Mula ko Achar (Fermented)
- Noodle soup
- Phapar ko roti
- Pokhemma
- Press cake
- Pukala
- Pustakari
- Puwa/chamal ko puwa - made from coarsely ground rice
- Qeema
- Raita
- Rikikur - Sherpa potato pancake
- Rildhuk/Rildok - mashed and pounded potato Sherpa soup
- Roti
- Saag
- Saatu
- Samay baji
- Sapu mhicha
- Sekuwa
- Sel roti
- Sidra - small dried fish
- Sikarni - Dessert made from strained yoghurt, fruits and dried nuts
- Sinki
- Sittan - snacks accompanying alcoholic drinks
- Sukkha roti (comparable to tortilla)
- Sukuti
- Swan puka
- Tama - bamboo shoots
- Taas
- Tarasari
- Taruwa - made of vegetables dipped in a gram flour batter and fried.
- Thali
- Thukpa - soup noodles
- Thakuwa - cookies made during Chhath festival in Terai region.
- Wachipa

=== Curries ===
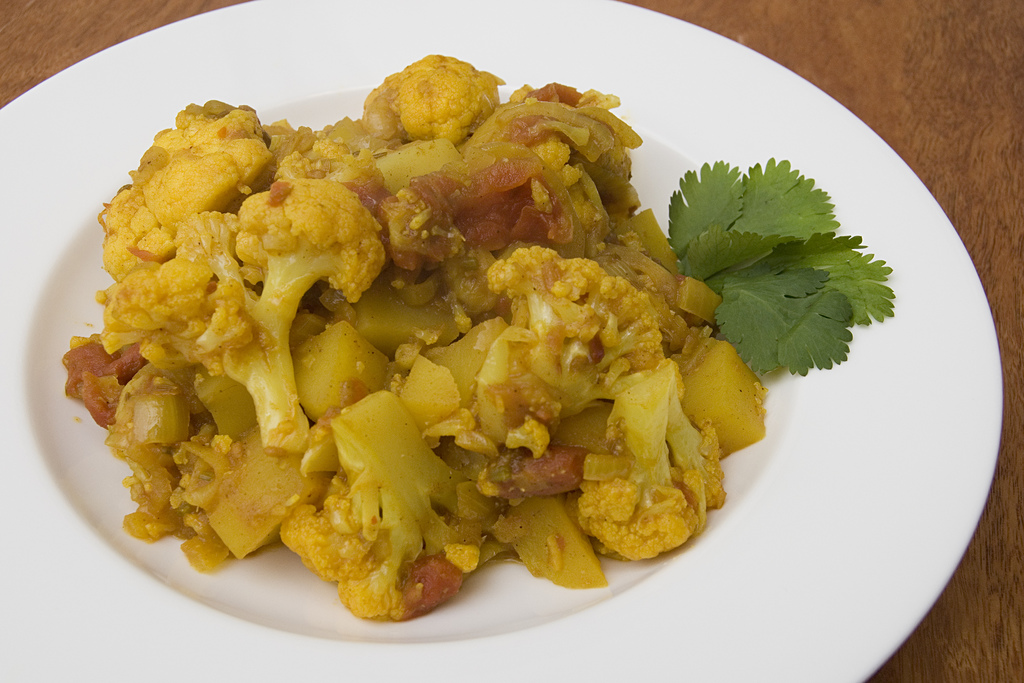
Aloo kauli/gobi is prepared with potato, cauliflower and spices.

- Aloo kauli
- Kukhurako masu – Chicken spiced stew
- Goat stew
- Gundruk
- Tama
- Vegetable tarkari
- Pork stew
- Mixed Veg Tarkari
- Masyaura
- Dal
- Saag
- Aloo Tama (potatoes with bamboo shoots)
- Gundruk ko Jhol
- Aloo Kerau

=== Newa cuisine ===
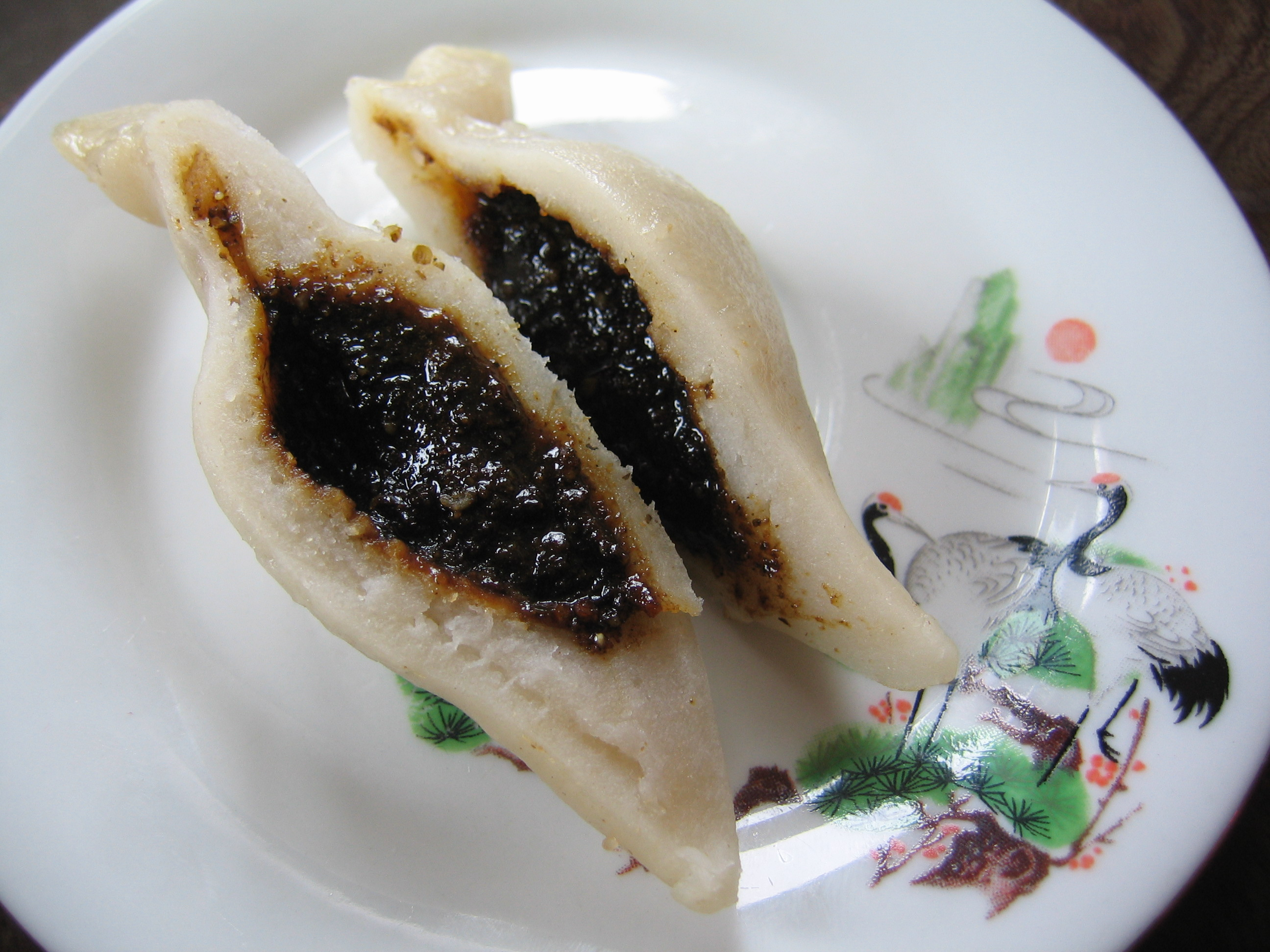
Sliced yomari

- Aalu achar
- Bodi ko Achar
- Chataamari
- Dhau
- Gwaramari
- Kachilaa
- Lakhamari
- Sanyaa
- Sanyaakhunya
- Thwon
- Yomari
- Alu tama
- Choila
- Pau kwa
- Sapu Mhicha

=== Rajbanshi cuisine ===
- Bhakkha
- Pitha bhaja

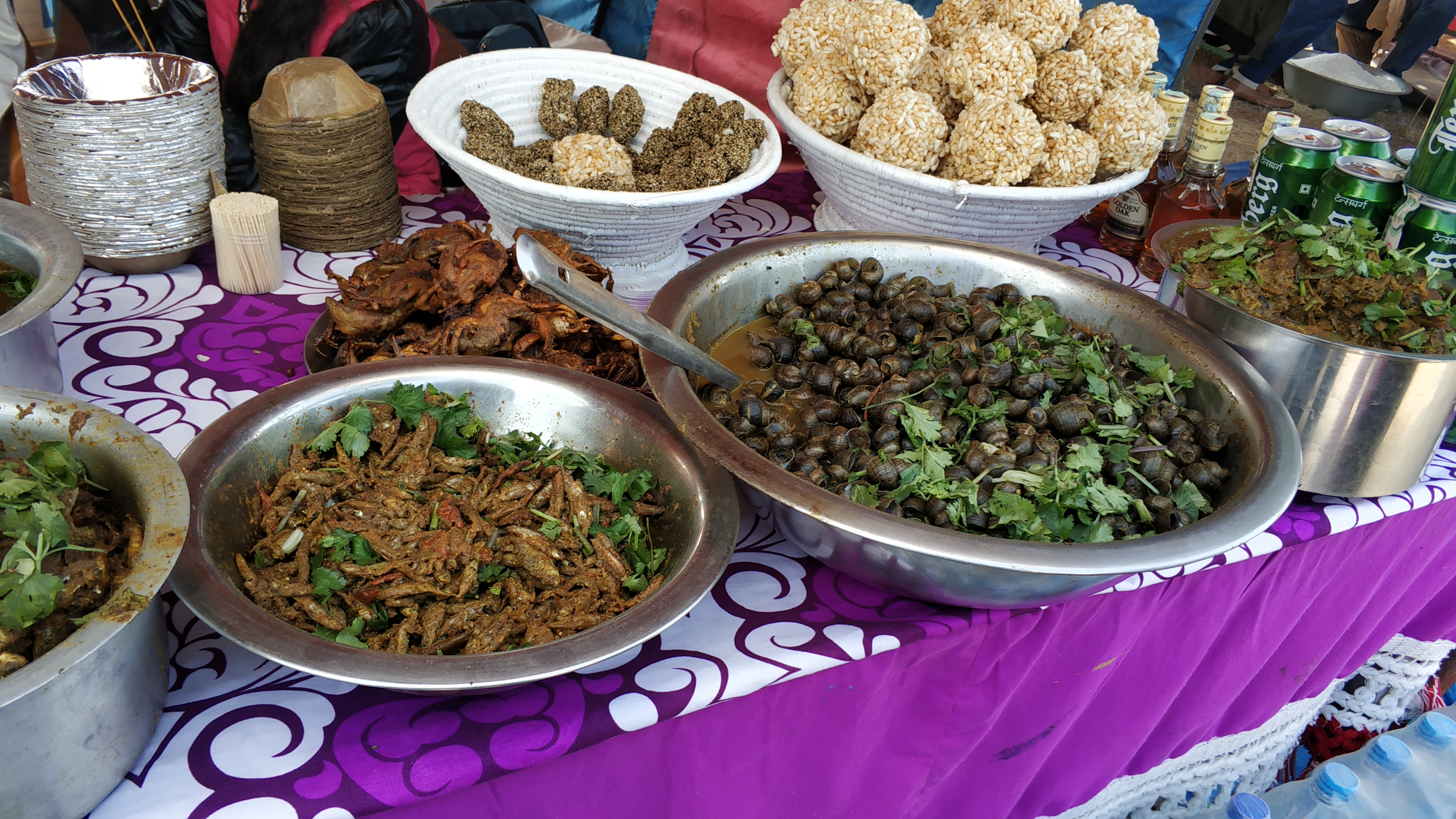
Tharu food

=== Madheshi cuisine ===
- Ghonghi
- Dhikri
- Bagiya
- Bhakkha
- Katiya
- Pitthi
- Dal pitthi
- Chhachharuwa
- Dal puri
- Khajuri
- Thekuwa
- Ghongha
- Kasaar
- Maluwa
- Padukiya
- Puwa
- Dudh puwa
- Sohjan Chokha
- Maslaar
- Jhinga fry
- Siddhri
- Rice roti
- Chiura dahi
- Bhatmas
- Channa
- Bari
- Kari
- Taruwa
- launglatti
- gajjaa
- Khuwa
- Khaja mithai
- Methauri
- Sukuti (kobhi, mula, bhanta)
- Tilauri
- Danauri
- Saag ke pithuri
- Kadam ke chatni/tarkari
- Ol ke tarkari/chatni/chap
- Pumpkin’s leaves taruwa
- Bhathuwa sukuti
- Daal ke tarkari
- Lahari daal
- Bathuwa saag (most famous in Madheshi culture thy is consumed in winter)
- Achaar (Aalo, Bhindi, mango, lemon, Mula, aura, Kathal, Chilli, Paror, kobhi, lasun)
- Bharuwa (Paror, Karaila, bhanta)
- Lemon’s nimkee
- Satuwa
- Makai bhuja
- Makai roti
- Maruwa roti
- khowa padukiya
- Kasaar
- Malbhog
- Suji halwa
- sabardana kheer
- Sebai kheer
- Mohi
- Kobta ( Kathal, bhanta, Paror, Kera)
- Khurma
- Fofi
- Bangla daal
- Khesari saag
- Teesi
- Gahu oraha
- Dhhan lawa
- Aluwa

=== Beverages ===
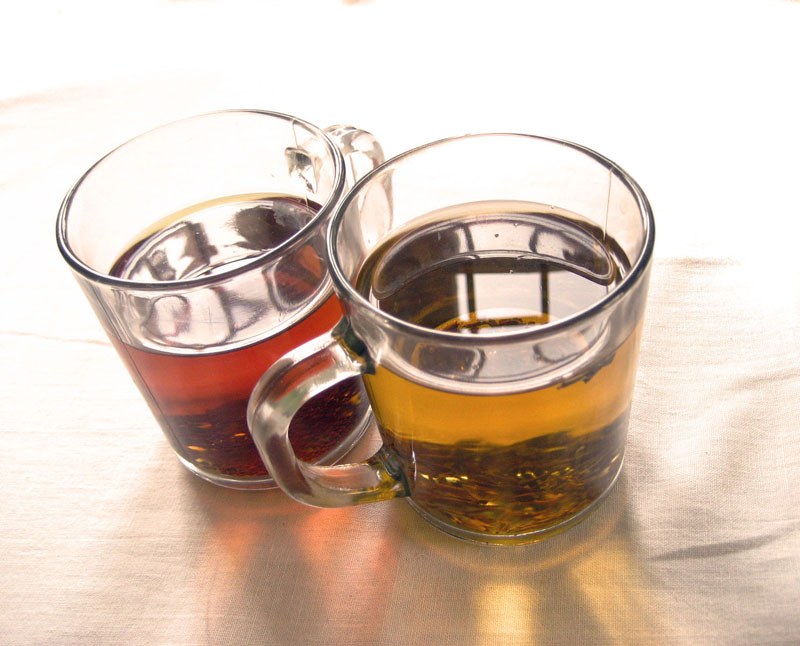
Nepali tea

- Aila (liquor)
- Taadi
- Sattu
- Lassi
- Mahi
- Butter tea
- Chhaang
- Masala chiya/chai
- Mohi - buttermilk
- Nepali tea/Nepali chiya – a beverage from the leaves of tea plants produced in Nepal
- Raksi {Senteyrem (in Kalimpong)} (local liquor)
- Rakura chiya/tea
- Tongba
- Khukuri/khukri rum
- Nigar
- Sharbat

== Gallery ==
Newari Foods of Nepal's Newar Community

== See also ==
- Nepal Food Corporation
- Nepalese cuisine
