= Samay baji =

Newar dish of Nepal

Samay baji (Nepal Bhasa: समय् बजि) is an authentic traditional dish of the Newar community in Nepal. In recent years, it has become one of the main attractions of Nepalese cuisine. It is considered a typical dish of the Newar community and has been passed down through generations, remaining highly appreciated by the people.

There are no specific seasons for serving Samay Baji, but it is most commonly served during auspicious occasions, family gatherings, and Newar festivals. It is eaten as a starter during every festival, religious activity, and puja, and is also served during Sharada (death anniversary rituals). Due to its simplicity, it is enjoyed throughout the year, as it is easy to make and can be stored for a long time.

Samay Baji is also served during major festivals in Nepal, such as Indra Jatra, Dashain, and Tihar (including Laxmi Puja and Bhai Tika). This dish is served in almost all of the activities of the Newar community.

== Recipe ==
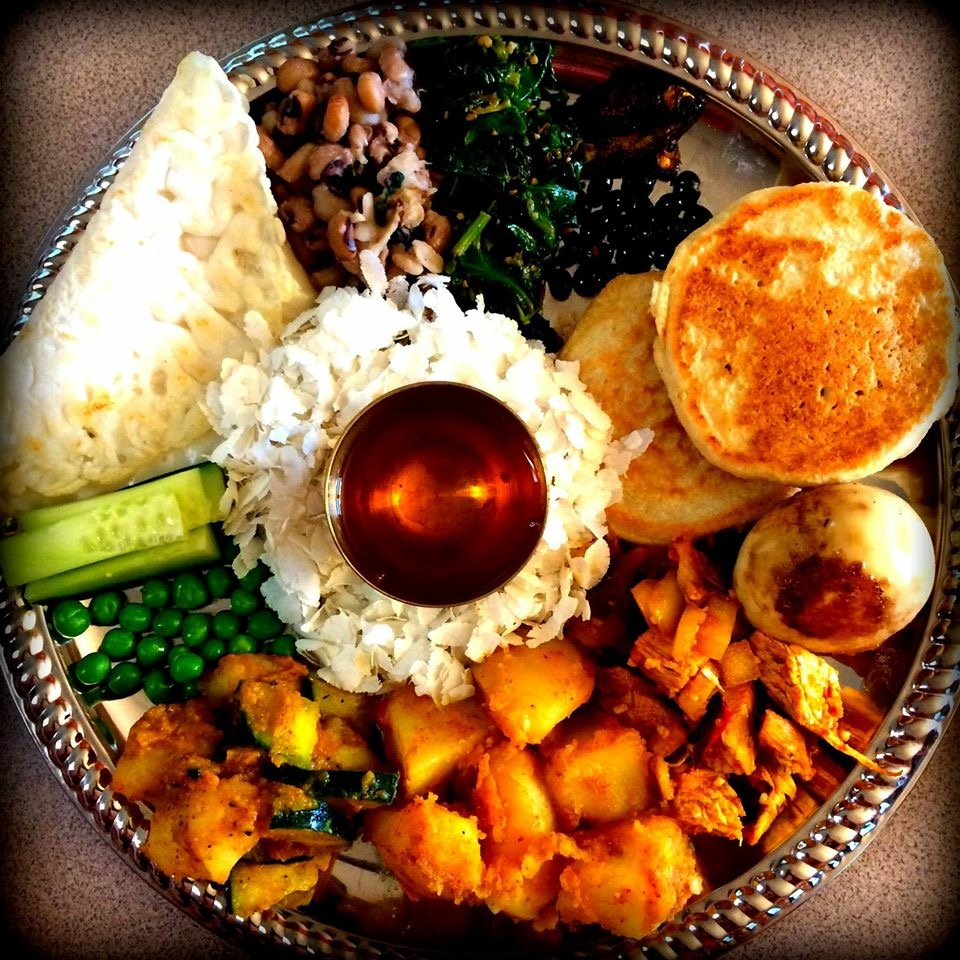
Image of a Newa cuisine "Samaybaji"

Samay Baji consists of various items served on a single plate. The main components include flattened rice (chiura), fried black soybeans (bhatmas), lentil pancakes (bara), rice pancakes (chatamari), buffalo meat (chhwela), finely chopped ginger (palu), fried boiled egg (khen), fried fish (sanyaa), pickled boiled beans (bodi ko achar), spicy potato salad (Aalu-Wala), greens (saag), and Newar wine (Ayla).

Samay Baji also features achar, a tangy and spicy medley of different vegetables, typically including radish, carrot, onion, potatoes, and peas. These are combined with a unique Nepalese berry called lapsi. Recipes vary from household to household and may include ingredients such as asafoetida, Sichuan pepper, black salt, Himalayan pink salt, mustard, mustard oil, and a satay of fenugreek seeds with turmeric powder.

== Origin ==
Among the Newar people, there were merchants, priests, goldsmiths, blacksmiths, and others. However, a significant portion of the population were farmers in earlier times. They followed the four seasons of the year, which influenced their habits and lifestyle. At that time, there was no electricity or gas as there is today, so the primary source of fire was logs of wood. Burning wood was a tedious and time-consuming task, which meant that cooking was done twice a day: once in the morning and once in the evening.

As a result, all the family members would have their meal in the morning, right after sunrise, before heading out to work on their farms. The concept of breakfast had not yet existed in Nepal. Since the Newar people lived in close-knit communities, their houses or huts were built next to each other. However, their farms were located quite far from their homes, requiring them to walk an hour each day just to reach them. There were no significant structures along the way, except for small shelters offering some shade from the sun or protection from the rain.

Since they ate their main meal early in the morning, they took snacks to eat during the midday. These snacks were designed so that they did not need to be reheated or recooked. This is why foods like chiura, chhwela, bhatmas, palu, saag, and others were made. These snacks were not only prepared for their taste but also for their nutritional benefits. For example, palu is good for acidity and gas problems, bhatmas helps reduce the risk of heart diseases, mustard oil used in making chhwela aids in killing germs, and saag is a good source of vitamins.

== See also ==
- Newa cuisine
- Nepalese cuisine
- Baji (food)
- Flattened rice
- Newa Festival
