= List of Jatras in Nepal =

Street festival by the Newars

Jatra (Newar: 𑐖𑐵𑐟𑑂𑐬𑐵, Nepali: जात्रा) refers to the types of Newa Festivals involving street festival or carnival.

== List of Jatras ==
- Janadya Jatra: Celebrated in central Kathmandu
- Yenya (Indra Jatra): Celebrated in central Kathmandu
- Bungdya Jatra: Celebrated in Patan
- Bisak Jatra: Celebrated in Major parts of Bhaktapur
- Bisket Jatra: Celebrated in Bhaktapur, Dhapasi, Madhyapur Thimi, Tokha and other places in Nepal
- Bhoto Jatra: Celebrated in Patan
- Gai Jatra: Celebrated in the Kathmandu Valley
- Ghode Jatra: Celebrated in Tundikhel, Kathmandu
- HaadiGaun Jatra: Celebrated in Hadigaun in Kathmandu
- Khame Jatra: Celebrated on the Bhaktapur on the ninth day of Dasain
- Shikali Jatra: Celebrated in Khokana, Lalitpur
- Dolkhala Jatra: Celebrated in Dolkha
- Dharmasthali Jatra: Celebrated in Dharmasthali in Kathmandu
- Indrayani Jatra:Celebrated in Kathmandu
- Navadurga Jatra:Celebrated in Bhaktapur

== See also ==
- Newar
- Newa Festival
