= Newar cuisine =

Type of Nepalese cuisine

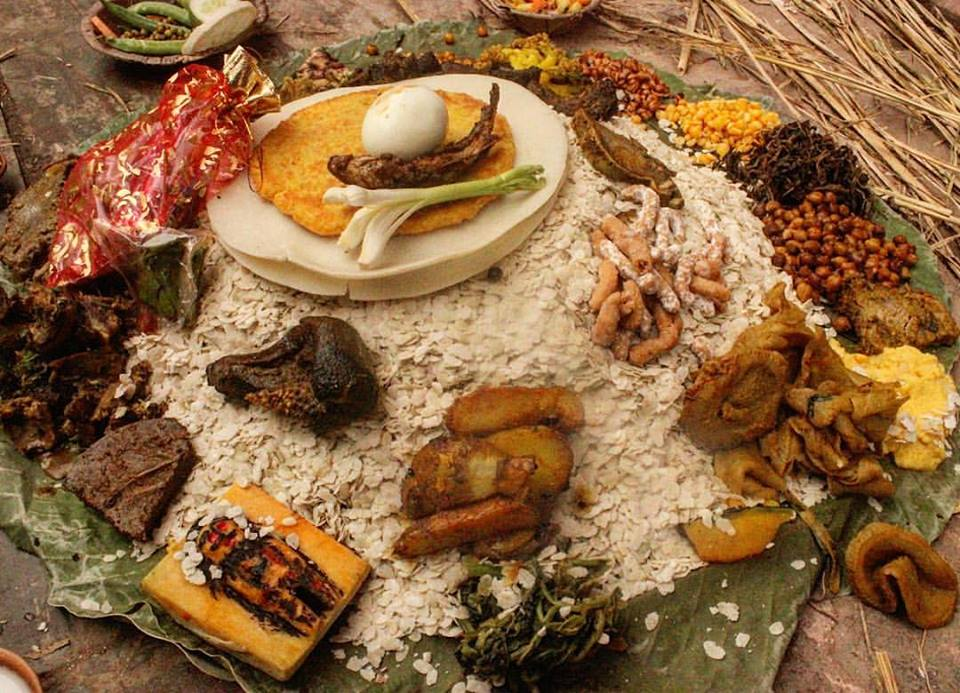
Lapte Bhwe; Newar cuisine

Newar cuisine (Newar: 𑐣𑐾𑐰𑐵𑑅 𑐣𑐳𑐵), also referred to as Newari cuisine, is a subset of Nepalese cuisine that has developed over centuries among the Newars of the Nepal Mandala region in Nepal. Newa cuisine is more elaborate than most Nepalese cuisines because the Kathmandu Valley has exceptionally fertile alluvial soil and enough wealthy households to make growing produce more profitable than cultivating rice and other staples.

Food is an integral part of the Newar culture. Dishes served during feasts and festivals have symbolic significance.

Newa cuisine is recognized as one of the oldest food cultures in South Asia. Daily meals in Newa cuisine are commonly referred to as "Jā Neu/जा नेउ" or "Newa Thali" (also known as "Newa Jā Bhu/जा भु"). These meals typically consist of Taichin rice, lentil soup, a variety of green vegetables, assorted vegetable dishes, and meat items, accompanied by pickles. Traditionally, he morning meal is known as "Jyaana/ज्या:न," the afternoon meal is called "Baji/ बजी," and the evening meal is referred to as "Beli/बेली."

== Lunch and dinner ==
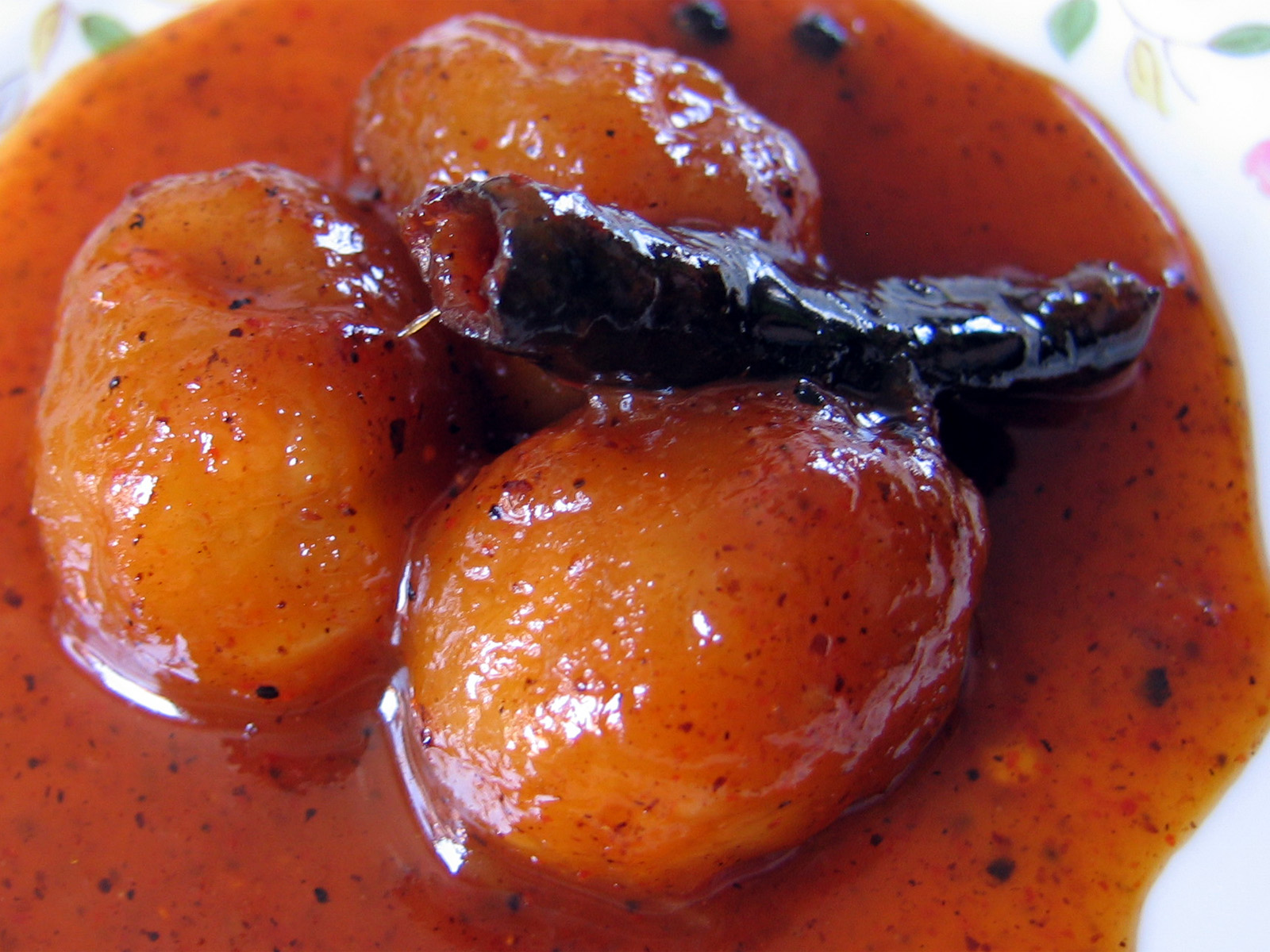
Āmli achār, relish made of Himalayan hog plum

- Jā (boiled rice)

=== Meat dishes ===
- Choila (ground buffalo meat)
- Pālulā (buffalo meat and ginger curry)
- Senlāmu (raw ground buffalo liver seasoned with spices)

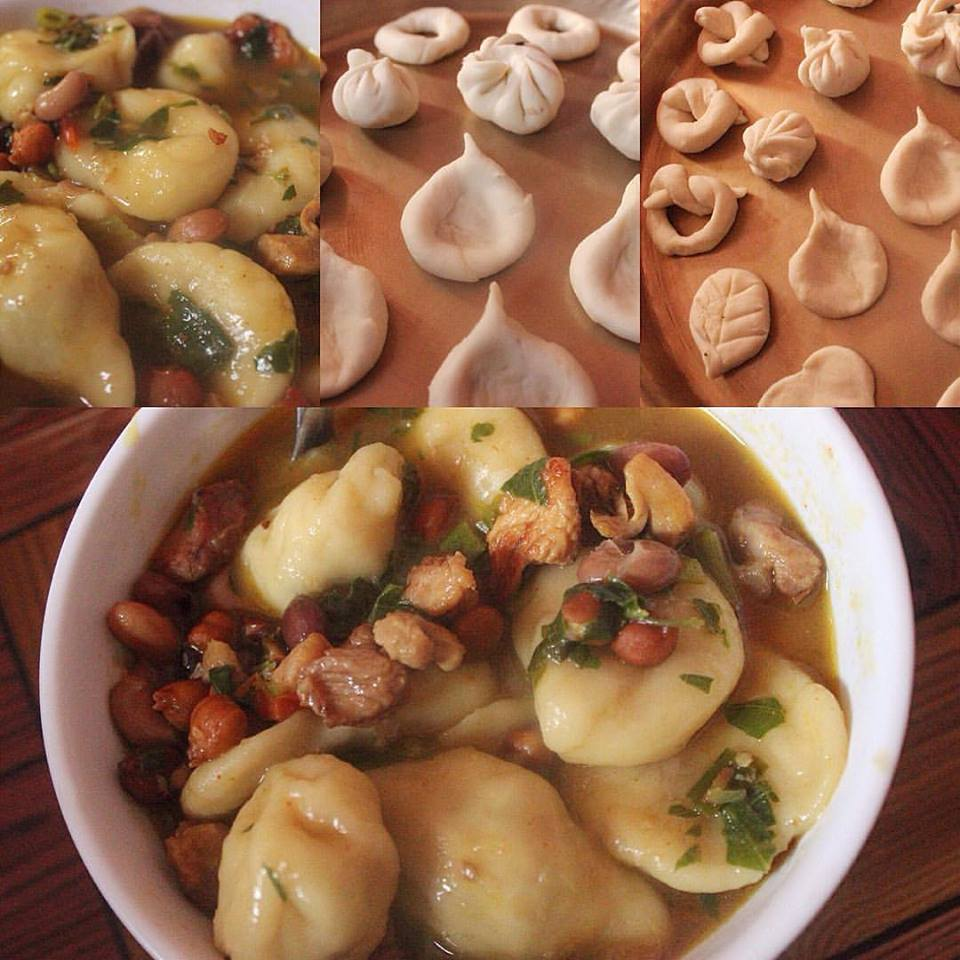
Gwarcha; Newa cuisine

=== Vegetable dishes ===
- Tarkāri (vegetable curry)
- Wāunchā (green vegetables)
- Tukan:chā
- Palācha
- Shākechā
- Chōlechā

=== Soups ===
- Keń (lentil soup)
- Simi (beans)
- Mi (fenugreek)
- Aaila (leftover rice after preparing rice beer)
- Chwahon (tama in Nepali) (bamboo shoot)

=== Relishes ===
- losa (relish)

== Lunch ==
- Baji (beaten rice)
- Chatānmari (rice flour crepe)
- Chhusyā (parched wheat)
- Gophuki (puffed rice)
- Gwaramari (deep-fried dough)
- Hājā (steamed rice)
- Jākimari (rice flour pancake)
- Kani (popcorn)
- anda fri (fried egg)
- Musyā (roasted soybean)
- Sukulā (dried meat)
- Wo (fried lentil cake)
- Bara (fried lentil cake with a hole like a donut)

== Feast foods ==
=== Meat dishes ===
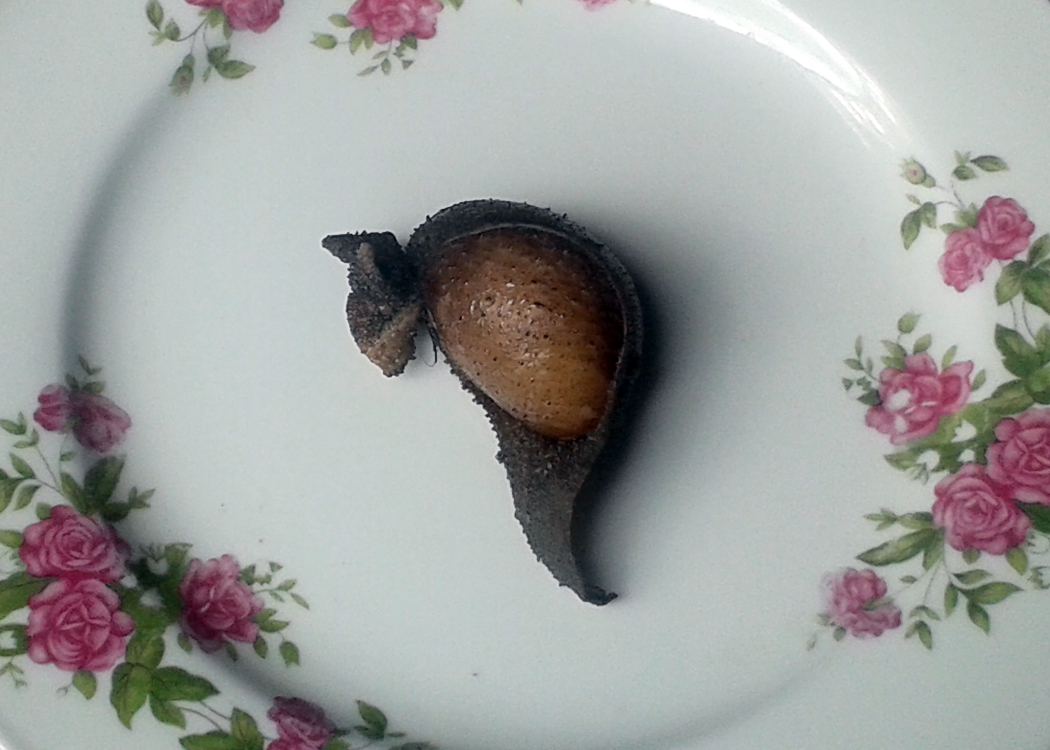
Sapu mhichā, leaf tripe bag stuffed with bone marrow

- Dāyekālā (buffalo meat curry)
- Dugulā (goat meat curry)
- Heynlā (duck curry)
- Bandella (wild boar meat)
- Changrala (mountain goat meat)
- Khasilā (gelded goat meat)
- Nyā (fish curry)
- Sanya (small fish)
- Chohi (steamed buffalo blood)
- Janlā (marinated diced with skin raw meat)
- Kachilā (marinated raw minced buffalo meat)
- Khāyālā (chicken curry)
- Me (buffalo tongue boiled, sliced and fried)
- Pangra
- Nhyapu (brains boiled, sliced and fried)
- Nyāpukā (fried fish)
- Pukālā (fried meat intestine, e.g. liver, heart etc.)
- Sanyā-khunā (spicy jellied fish soup)
- Sapu mhichā (leaf tripe bag stuffed with bone marrow)
- Swan pukā (goat lungs filled with batter and boiled, sliced and fried)
- Takhā (jellied buffalo meat curry)

=== Vegetable dishes ===
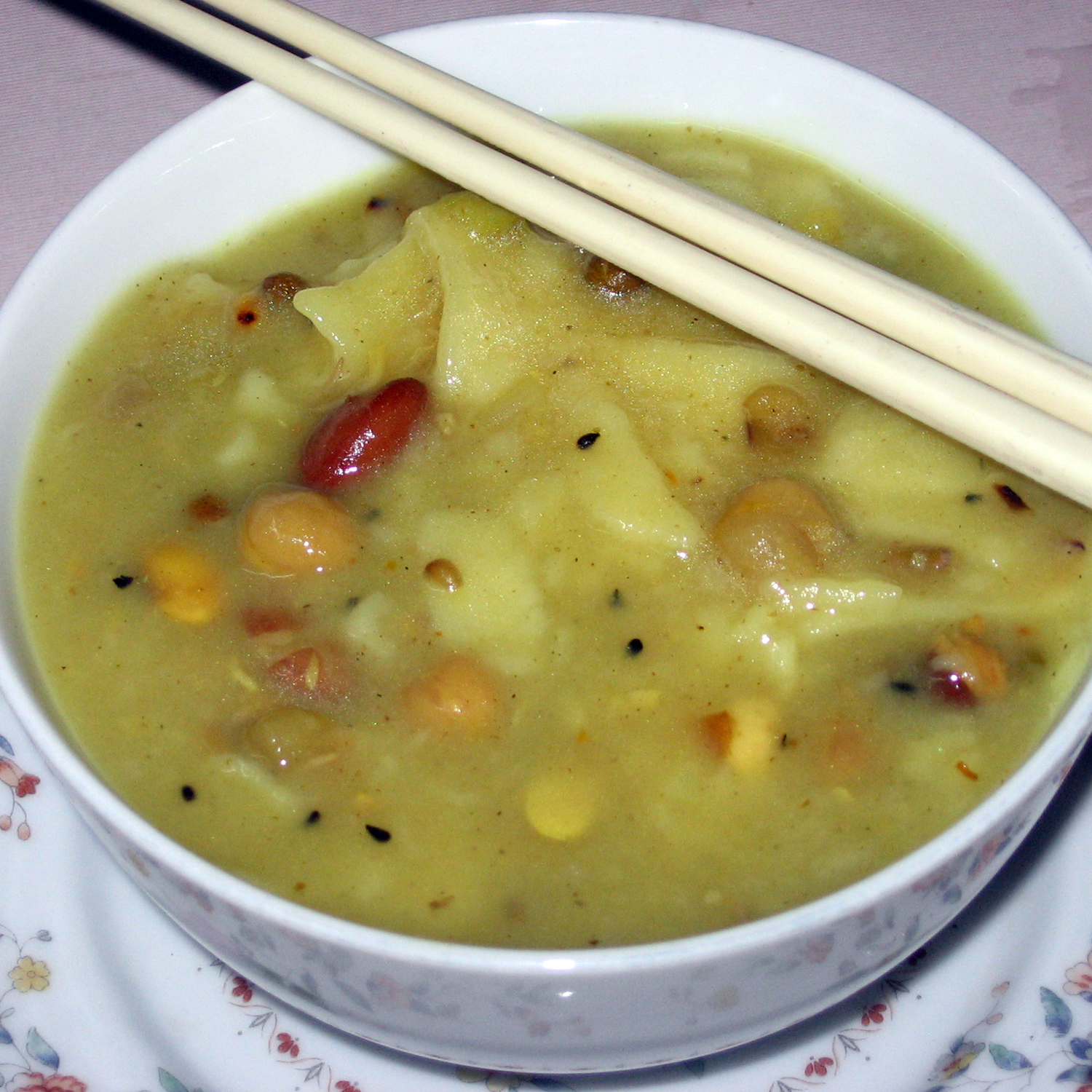
Kwati mixed beans soup

- Buba kwā (beans curry)
- Chhon kwā (curry of bamboo shoots and potato)
- Kwāti (soup made of nine types of sprouted beans)
- Mee kwā (curry of fenugreek seeds)
- Pancha kwā (mixed vegetable curry of bamboo shoots, potato, dried mushroom, dried radish and blackeyed pea)

=== Soups ===
- Bullā or ka kwā (soup made of the dregs of rice beer, diced spleen and other meats, bone marrow and bone)
- Chhyāllā (soup made of shredded pickled radish and diced variety meats)
- Pāun kwā (sour soup of Himalayan hog plum)

== Festival foods ==
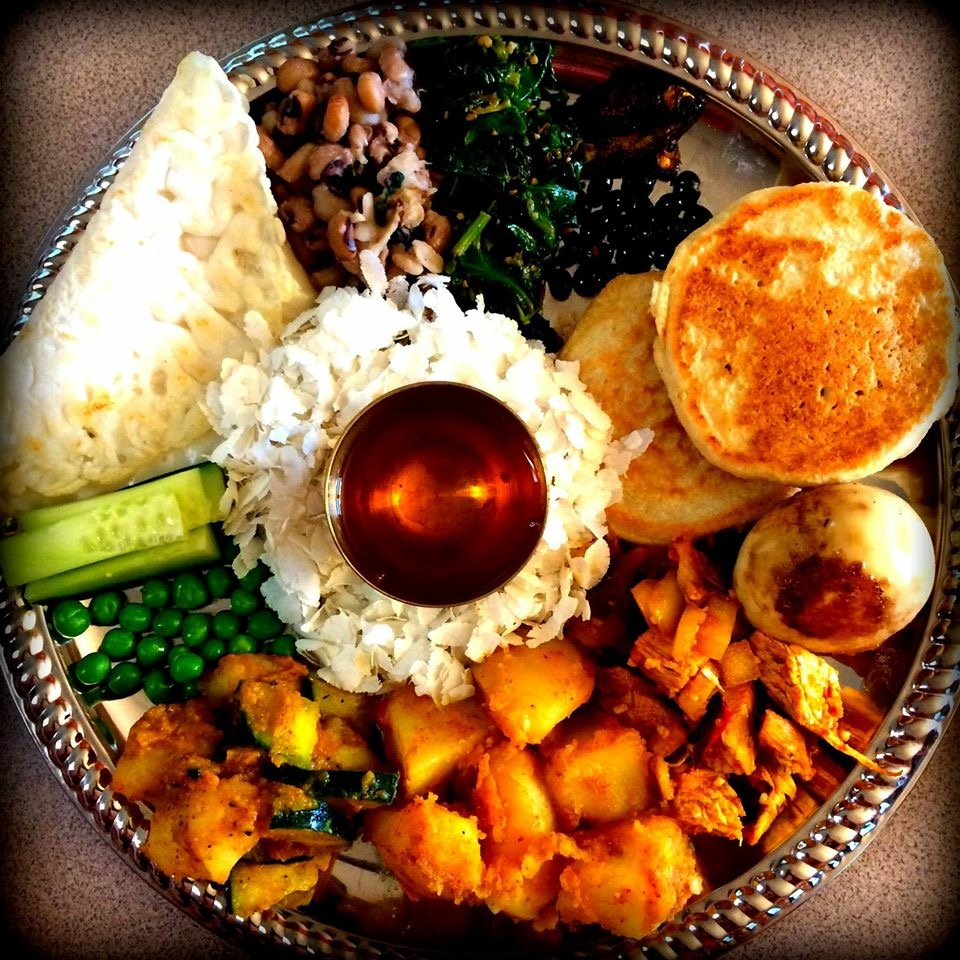
Image of a Newa cuisine "Samaybaji"

- Samaybaji (set of beaten rice, roasted meat, vegetables, cowpea, soybean and ginger)
- Syābaji (parched rice)

=== Meat dishes ===
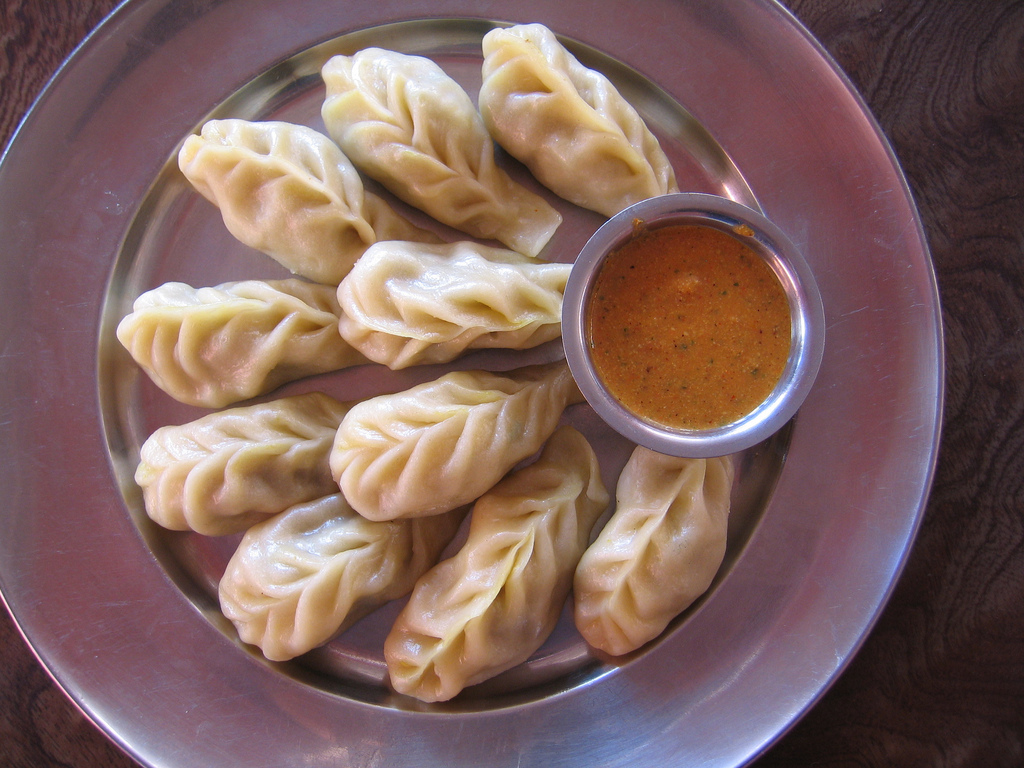
A plate of momo

- Chhoylā (either boiled or smoked, sliced and marinated buffalo meat)
- Ghalmal (mixed curry of diced lentil cake, green vegetables and leftover meat seasoned with Nepal pepper)
- Hāku Chhoylā (roasted, diced and marinated buffalo meat)
- Momochā (dumplings filled with minced buffalo or chicken meat)*
- Kunyā (smoked fish)

=== Vegetable dishes ===
- Chākuhi (boiled sweet potato)
- Hāku Musyā (roasted black soybean mixed with oil and salt)
- Lābhā (chopped garlic greens mixed with spices)
- Pālu (diced raw ginger)

== Salads ==
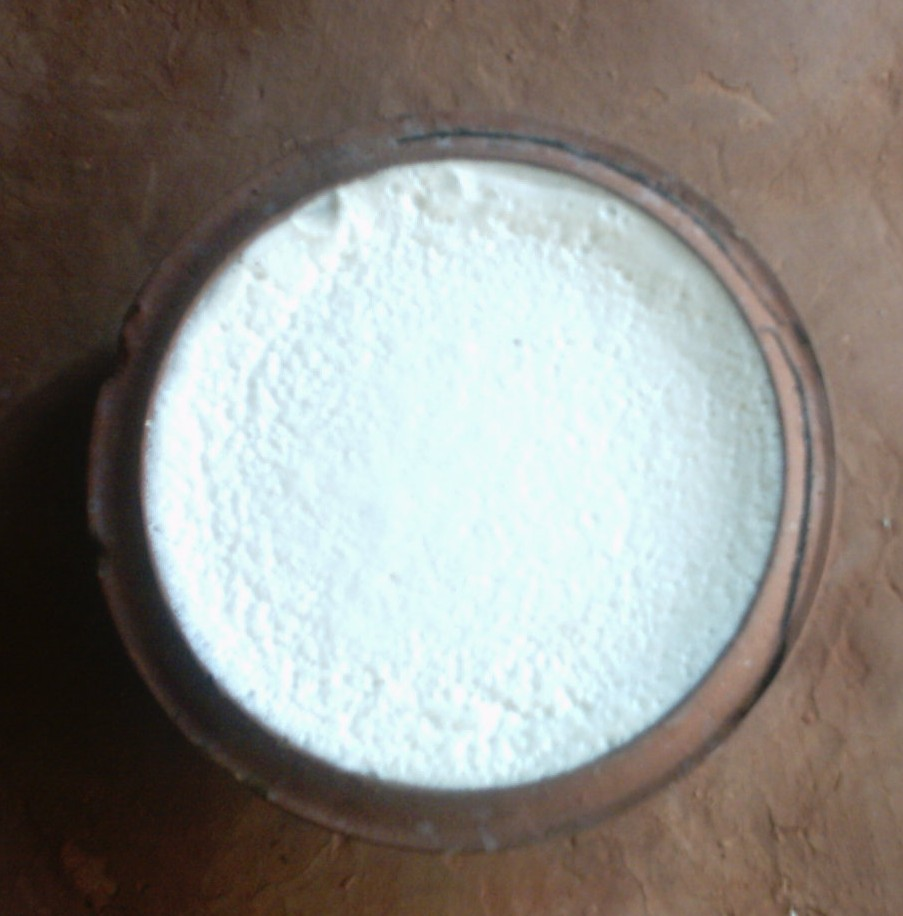
Dhau (yogurt) in an earthen bowl

- Kaywu (soaked field pea and garden pea)
- Lain (sliced radish)
- Tusi (sliced cucumber)
- laaie (sliced radish )

== Dessert ==
- Dhau (yogurt)
- Juju Dhau (yogurt/curd originated from Bhaktapur)
- Marichari (may include anything sweet from soft milk based pastries to fried bread dipped in caramel)
- Laakhamari (made from flour and sugar, cooked in hot oil)
- Guulmari (made from flour and sugar, cooked in hot oil)
- Baalbara
- Yomari (made from chaku and floor and steamed like momo)
- Anarsha
- Ainthe-Mari
- Khajuri
- Roowth
- Fini roti
- Nimki
- Lakshmimari
- Swaari
- Malpha
- Jeeri
- Gud-Paak
- Chimti
- Aiti Mari

== Drinks ==
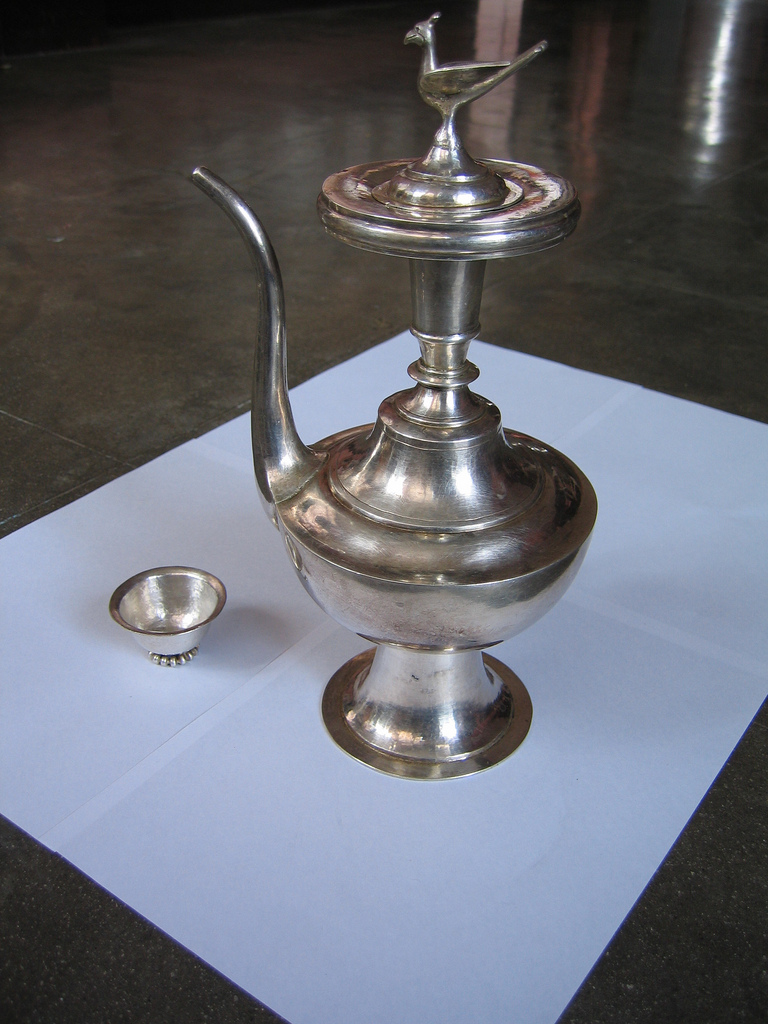
Anti (a type of vessel) liquor jar and bowl

- Aylā (liquor)
- Arak (rice beer)
- kaar-Thwon (brown beer)
- hyāun-Thwon (red beer)

== Utensils ==
Newars cook, store and serve food and beverages in containers and utensils made of gold, silver, copper, brass, iron, clay pottery, dried rice stalks, corn leaves and leaves of certain trees sewn together with toothpicks to make plates and bowls. Food is eaten with bare hands. It is customary to wash hands before and after a meal.

- Anti (alcohol jar)
- Bātā (basin)
- Chupi (knife)
- Dhampo (water pot)
- Hāsā (round winnowing tray)
- Karuwā (water jug)
- Kholā (bowl)
- Sali (small clay bowl)
- Somā (earthen wine pitcher)

== Gallery ==
Newari Foods of Nepal's Newar Community

== See also ==
- List of Nepalese dishes
