= Chunla =

Nepalese meat dish

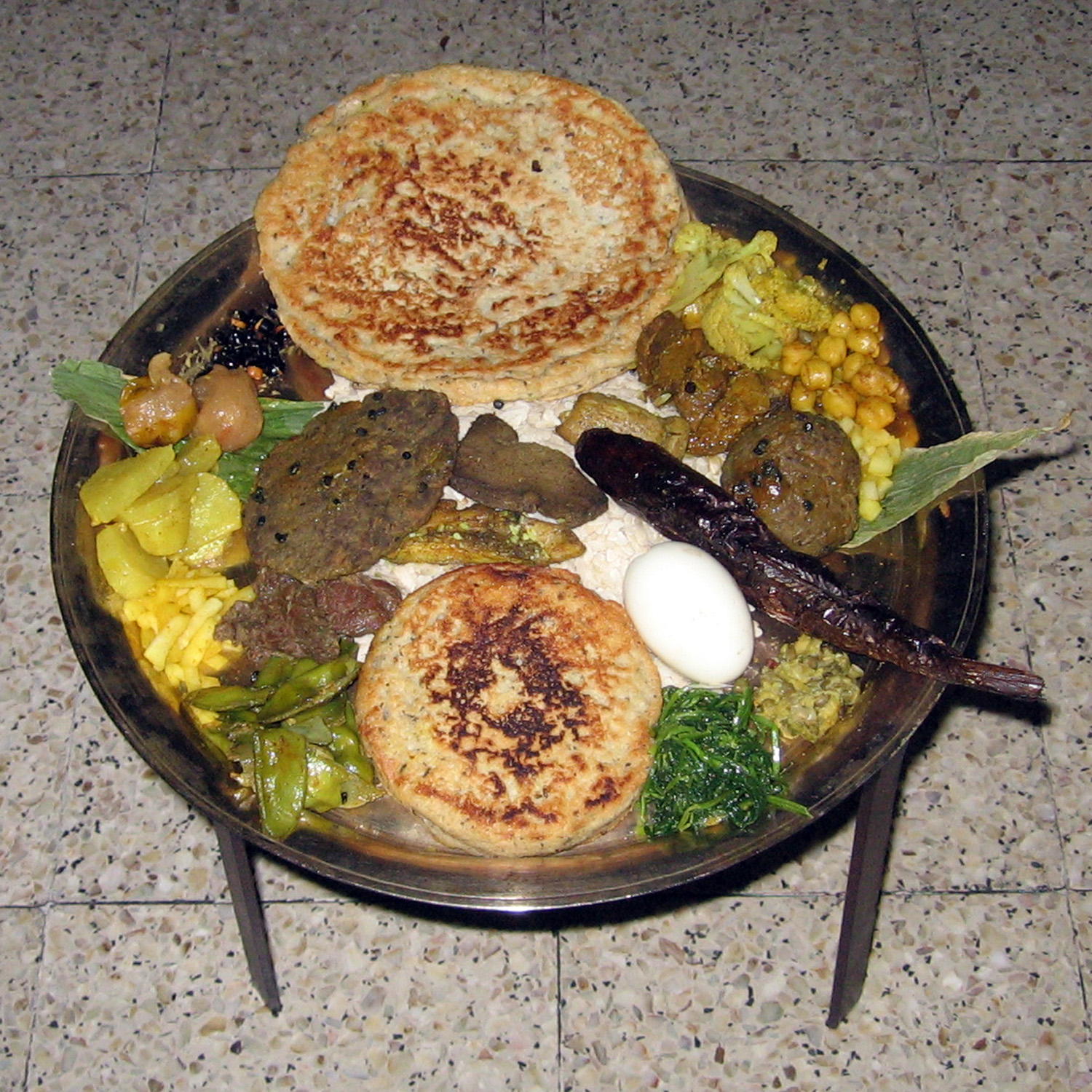
- "Lāgwa" meatball (center right) and "lāpi" meat patty (center left) on a large ceremonial plate.
- Place of origin: Nepal

Chunlā (Newar: चुंला, "ground meat") is a traditional meat dish of the Kathmandu Valley in Nepal. It is meat finely chopped by a chopping knife or meat grinder. Chunlā is a popular dish in Newar cuisine and is similar to Qeema found in other parts of South Asia.

== Production ==
Chunlā is made by grinding water buffalo meat and kneading spices into it. The meat is fried lightly in a pan and then simmered in water. In the last step, fenugreek seeds are bloomed in oil and poured over the meat.

Chunlā is also made into "lāgwa" (लाग्वः) meatball and "lāpi" (लापी) patty. The meat is rolled into a ball to make lāgwa or formed into a round shape to make lāpi before being fried and simmered in water. Lāgwa and lāpi are required food items during certain ceremonies.

Chunlā is also used without first cooking it as topping for "chatānmari" rice flour crepe and "wo" lentil patties, and as filling for momos.

== See also ==
- List of Nepalese dishes
