= Gwaramari =

Nepalese bread

- Type: Bread
- Course: Breakfast
- Place of origin: Nepal
- Region or state: Kathmandu Valley
- Created by: Newa cuisine
- Serving temperature: Hot
- Main ingredients: Flour, water, baking powder, spices
- Ingredients generally used: Cumin or other traditional seasonings

Gwaramari is a type of traditional bread from Newa cuisine in Nepal. The name derives from the Newa words gwara, meaning "round," and mari, meaning "bread". The bread is especially associated with the Kathmandu Valley, where it is commonly eaten as a breakfast food. It is typically served with milk tea and may form part of a simple morning meal.

== Preparation ==
Gwaramari is made from a dough prepared by combining flour, baking powder, water, and spices such as cumin or other seasonings used in Newa cooking. The mixture is shaped into small portions and deep-fried until the exterior becomes crisp and golden while retaining a soft interior.

== See also ==
- Nepal Mandala
