= Sapu mhicha =

Nepalese dish of the Newa community

Sapu Mhichā
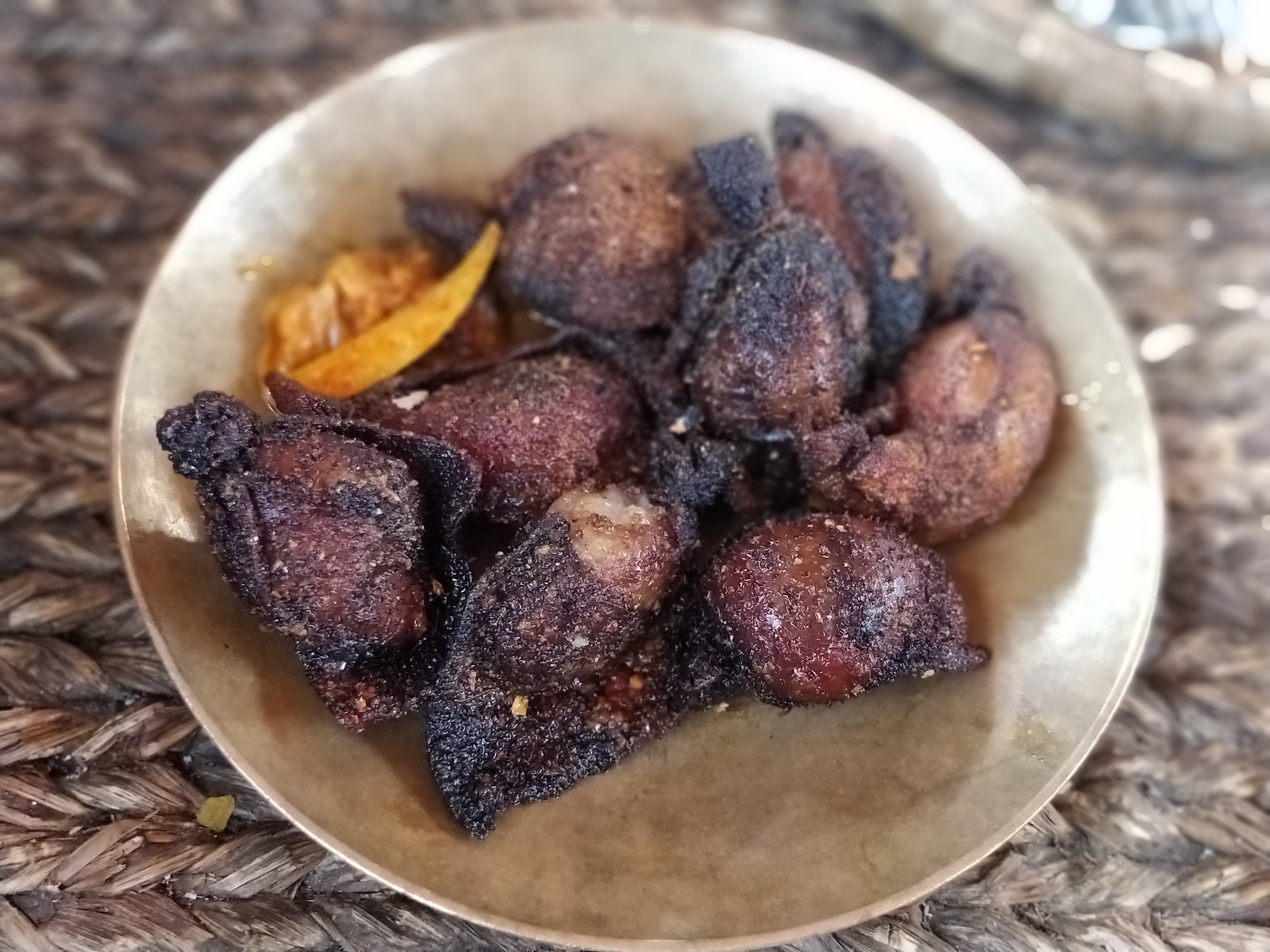
- Sapu Mhichā served in a traditional brass plate
- Place of origin: Nepal
- Region or state: Kathmandu Valley
- Main ingredients: Buffalo leaf tripe, bone marrow

Sapu Mhichā (Newar: सपू म्हिचा, lit. 'tripe bag') is a Nepalese dish of the Newa community, made up of buffalo leaf tripe stuffed with bone marrow. Sapu Mhichā is a special delicacy of the Newa cuisine of the Kathmandu Valley and is usually prepared during special occasions.

The delicacy is one of the dishes served to honor a man when he goes to the home of his wife's parents for festival dinners. It is served after the main course and before dessert.

== Preparation ==
Water buffalo leaf tripe is cut into small pieces and the layers separated to form bags. Diced bone marrow is stuffed into the bags. The opening is gathered and tied with a piece of thread to close it. The bags are then boiled and fried.

The eater puts the whole Sapu Mhichā in the mouth and bites it off, leaving the tied end between the forefinger and thumb. This way the melted bone marrow remains inside the mouth when it gushes out as the bag is ripped.

== See also ==
- List of Nepalese dishes
- List of stuffed dishes
