= Ghonghi =

Nepalese freshwater snail dish

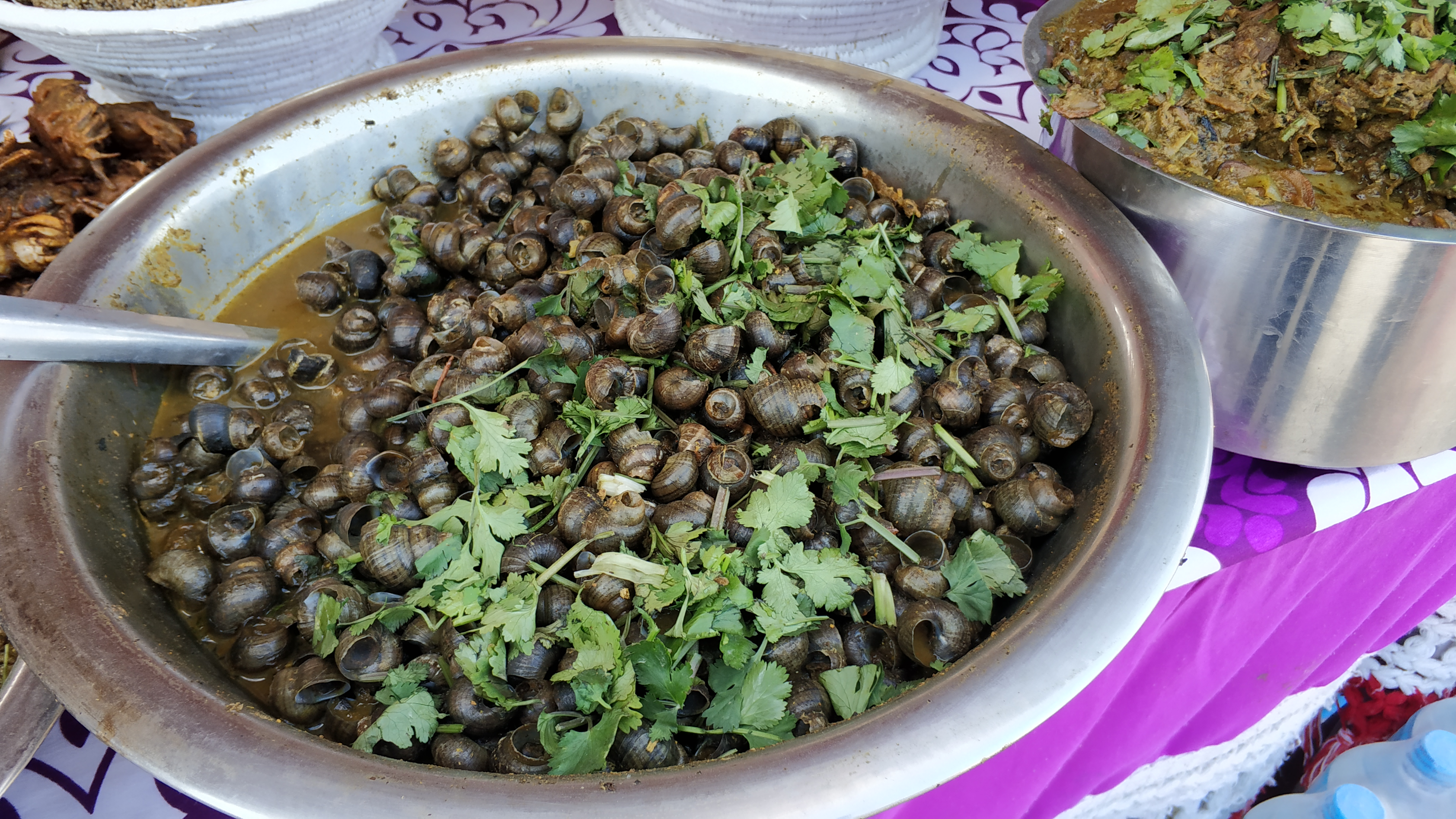
- Ghonghi, fresh water snails popularly made in Terai-Madhesh
- Alternative names: घोंगी
- Region or state: Terai
- Associated cuisine: Nepalese cuisine
- Serving temperature: Hot
- Main ingredients: Freshwater snail and Flaxseed

Ghonghi (Nepali: घोंगी) is a Nepalese freshwater snail dish prepared by the Tharu and Madheshi people of southern Nepal. It is eaten by sucking the snail from its shell and is found throughout the Madhesh Province and Terai districts of other states. It is also popular among Rajbanshi, Dhimals, Santhal and Danuwar people of Terai.

Ghonghi is eaten during the paddy season, when rice is planted and there is abundant amount of snails present in the rivers and paddy fields. The collected snails are then cleaned, and the tails are cut to make it easier to extract the meat when cooked. The snails are then boiled and cooked similarly like other curries, with a crucial addition of flaxseed which not only gives the dish a consistency but also enhances its flavor. Ghongis are served with rice and have been a staple food of the indigenous people of Terai for ages.

== See also ==
- Dhikri
- Bagiya
- Bhakkha
- Katiya
