= Navadurga Jatra =

Festival in Lalitpur, Nepal

Navadurga Jatra is a festival celebrated every 12 years in the Thecho and Sunakothi regions of the Lalitpur district, Nepal. During the Jatra, masked dancers posing as deities perform a ritual dance at Mulchowk in Patan Durbar Square.

A tantric ritual is performed at the start of the Jatra at Bal Kumari Temple in Sunakothi on the seventh day of Dashain (Fulpati). Worship is performed until midnight, when an animal is sacrificed. The Jatra is composed of 28 festivals that are celebrated throughout the year. The main feast called Deyh Bhavay is the main highlight of the Jatra. A devotee dressed as god Bhairav serves the food. Seven types of dance rituals are performed by dancers dressed as 11 types of gods and goddesses. During the dance ritual period, weddings, feasts during death rituals, and bratabhanda are prohibited. The dance ritual was added in the Licchavi period.

The Jatra is managed by the Navadurga Guthi. All households in Thecho and Sunakothi attend the Jatra.

== Navadurga Jatra of Bhaktapur ==
A festival with the same name is also celebrated in Bhaktapur. 13 masked deities perform the Navadurga dance at various location in Bhaktapur. These deities are Bhairav, Mahakali, Barahi, Brahmayani, Maheshwari, Kumari, Vaishnavi, Indrayani, Ganesh, Mahadev, Shwet Bhairav and Nandi-Bhringi. This Jatra was started by King Bhuvan Malla to avoid famine and increase prosperity.

== See also ==
- List of Jatras in Nepal
