= Dhakane =

Nepalese rice dish

Dhakane (Nepali: ढकने), is a type of sweet Pulao, a dish made from rice, originating from Nepal. It is widely popular in all parts of Nepal, quite more in eastern Nepal and it is known with different names according to places. Although it is a sweet cuisine, it cannot be served as a dessert, because it is a heavy dish. It is usually served as dinner or lunch during festivals or special occasions. It is often associated and served along with or alternative of Kheer.

== Origin ==
It is originated in Eastern Nepal and it is claimed to be originated by Dhakal caste in Nepal. It is still widely popular among Dhakals of Nepal.

== See also ==
- Kheer
- List of Nepalese dishes
- Momo
