= Pustakari =

Nepali candy

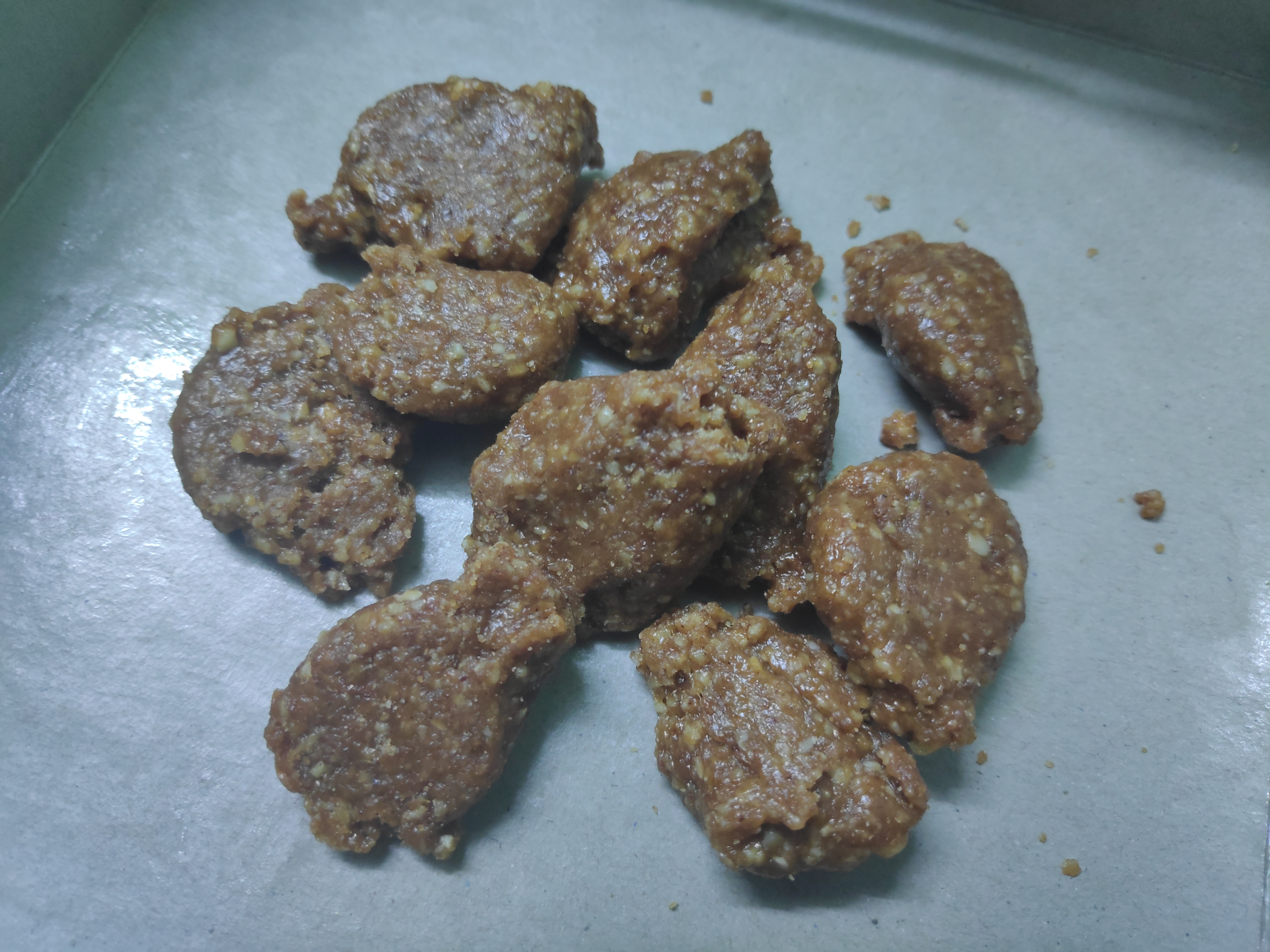
Pustakari

Pustakari (Nepali: पुष्टकारी pronounced [ˈpusʈʌkaɾi]) is a Nepali candy, made from molasses, cooked with ghee and milk, and topped with coconut, dates or nuts. In the Kathmandu Valley, where the Newar confectioners have refined the art of preparing it, it is known in Nepal Bhasa as 'postikan'.

== See also ==
- List of Nepalese dishes
- Sweets from the Indian subcontinent
