= Wachipa =

Nepalese dish

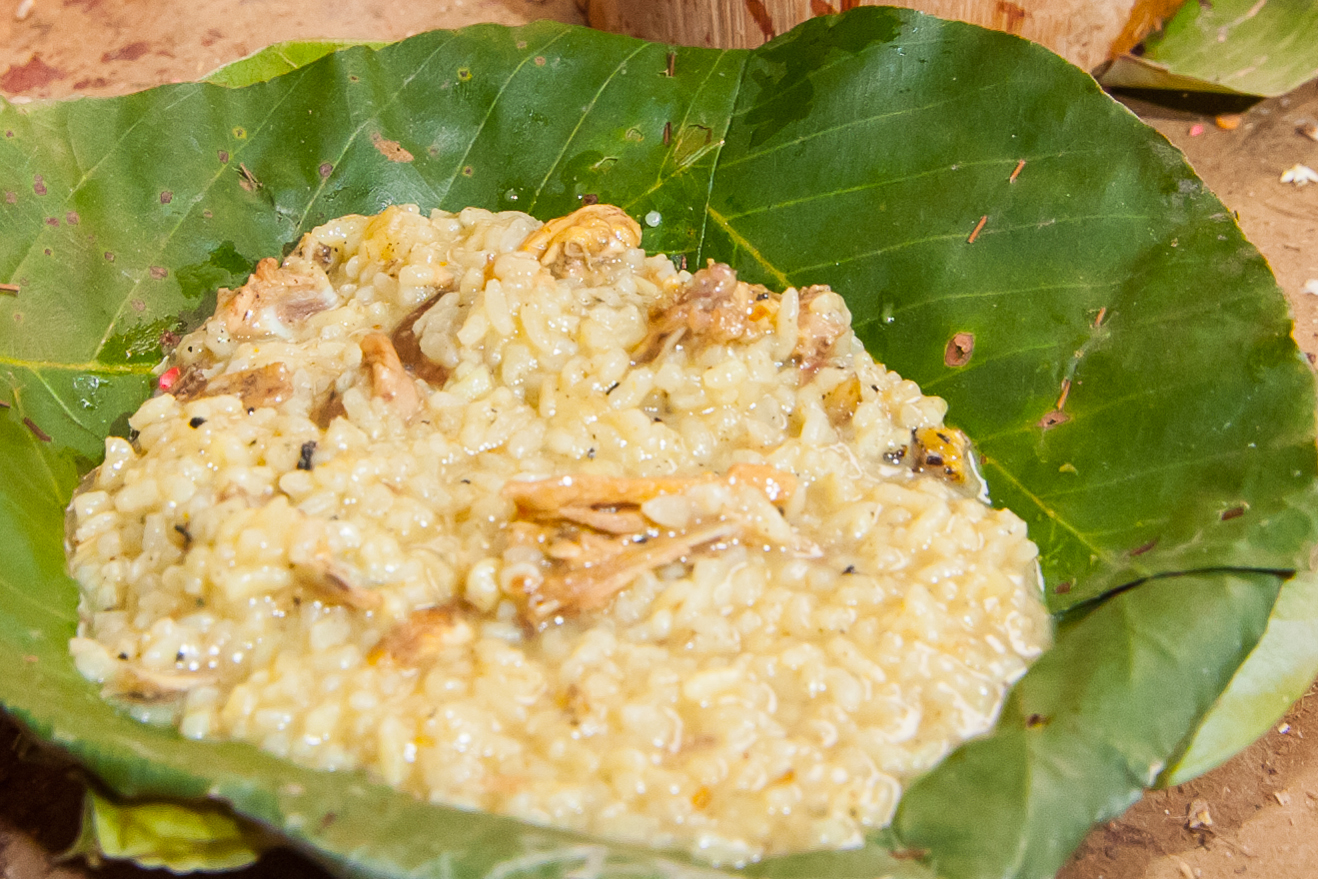
- A typical serving of wachipa.
- Course: Meal
- Place of origin: Nepal
- Region or state: Eastern Nepal, Sikkim, Darjeeling
- Created by: Rai people,
- Main ingredients: rice, chicken, burnt feathers, Damlapa flower

Wachipa (Nepali वाचिपा)is a typical Kirat Rai dish made with rice, minced chicken, and powder made out of burnt feathers of a chicken. The powder gives a unique bitter taste. Vegetarian wachipa is made by replacing meat with leaves or flowers of a plant called Damlapa, which is also bitter. It is eaten on special occasions. It is believed that consumption of wachipa cures body aches. It is called Wamik in Lohorung.

== See also ==
- List of Nepalese dishes
