= Kachilaa =

Newari marinated raw minced meat from Nepal

Kachilaa (Newari/Nepali:कचिला) is a special meat delicacy of Newars, consisting of marinated raw minced meat. Generally water buffalo meat is used, however lamb meat can also be used to make kachilaa.

It is made by mixing minced meat with various spices such as garlic, coriander leaves, red chilli, salt and chilli powder. After mixing the ingredients, hot oil containing fenugreek seed is poured over it. Some turmeric powder is also added and the mixed again until it becomes tender.

== See also ==
- Newa cuisine
- List of meat dishes
