= Indrayani Jatra =

Festival in Kathmandu, Nepal

Indrayani Jatra is an annual festival celebrated in Kathmandu, Nepal. The festival is held for eight days every year, starting on Marga Krishna Ekadashi (late November). The festival is celebrated by both Buddhist and Hindu communities together. The origin of the Jatra is unknown, but it is believed to have been started by the Licchavi.

== Mythology ==
According to the mythology, Indrayaini was one of the eight daughter of goddess Vatsala Maju (Bhuvaneshwori) of the Kathmandu valley, however she was poor and ignored by the family. Once Vatsala Maju invited all her daughters for a feast on the 29th day of Chilla (Paha Charhe), which occurs on the fifth lunar month of Nepal Era calendar. Seven of the daughters were served well on golden plates, but Indrayani and her children were ignored and given hard millet bread on leaf plates. She was harassed and ignored for being poor. This behaviour made her sad, and she left without eating the food. While going back home, her kids cried for being hungry. Indrayani could not handle the children's cries. So, she even could not remember where she left her children. By the time she reached her home, she was alone. An old woman saw her and gave her a pumpkin. Indrayani took the pumpkin and put it on the fire to cook. But she could not concentrate on cooking and cried for the whole night and slept. The next morning, there was smoke in the kitchen, so she rushed to check. However, instead of finding fire, she found a pot full of gold. The pumpkin had turned into the gold. But she was not felt greedy while seeing the gold. She took some piece of the gold and kept the remaining in the Bishnumati River for others to find. Because she had gold now, she was named Luti Ajima (Lu meaning gold in Newari). Her mother also started to treat her well. But she had not forgotten the mistreatment in the feast. So instead of joining the feast, she removed her jewellery and start feeding food to the gold jewelleriser and shouts out that they loved her wealth but not her. She went back to her home and decided to make a feast without inviting her mother or sisters. The Jatra is celebrated to mark the same feast.

== Festival procession ==
The Maharjans, Dongols, Mahanthas, Thaku Jujus, Kasais, Manandhars take part in the Jatra. The festival starts on Trayodashi day. An idol of Indrayani is brought from Tyauda to the Dhalko temple on a palanquin. A special snake-offering oblation (Sarpahuti Yagya) is performed on the temple premises. In this ritual, a pair of snakes, two fishes, sparrows and grasshoppers are offered to the flame. During the puja, men stand as guard at the temple's doors called Paa Pi Wonegu. During the festival, a 48 feet tall wooden pole called Yansi is raised inside the Indrayani Temple at Dhalko. The Bajracharyas of Thahity, Kathmandu bring their ancestral gods called Aju and Aji in the Indrayani Temple.

The next day, the idol of Indrayani is carried to Thahity on the palanquin to meets her children Swan Chhapu Ganesh, Bhudi Ganesh, Shova Bhagwati, Mankhacha and Jwalamai. All her children except Mankhacha and Jwalamai.

On the new moon day, the palanquin of Indrayani is carried around the city, including Swet Bhairav at Chhetrapati. In the past, Swet Bhairav was accompanied by Indrayani around the city, but this practice was stopped about 70 years ago.

== Indrayani Jatra of Kirtipur ==
A festival with similar name and same timing is also celebrated in Kirtipur, another city in the Kathmandu Valley. A procession of chariot, along with musical band, is done throughout the day to various locations. The goddess and her chariot is brought back to the main temple on the third day near the Bagh Bhairab Temple.
