= Bhakkha =

Nepalese and Indian rice cake

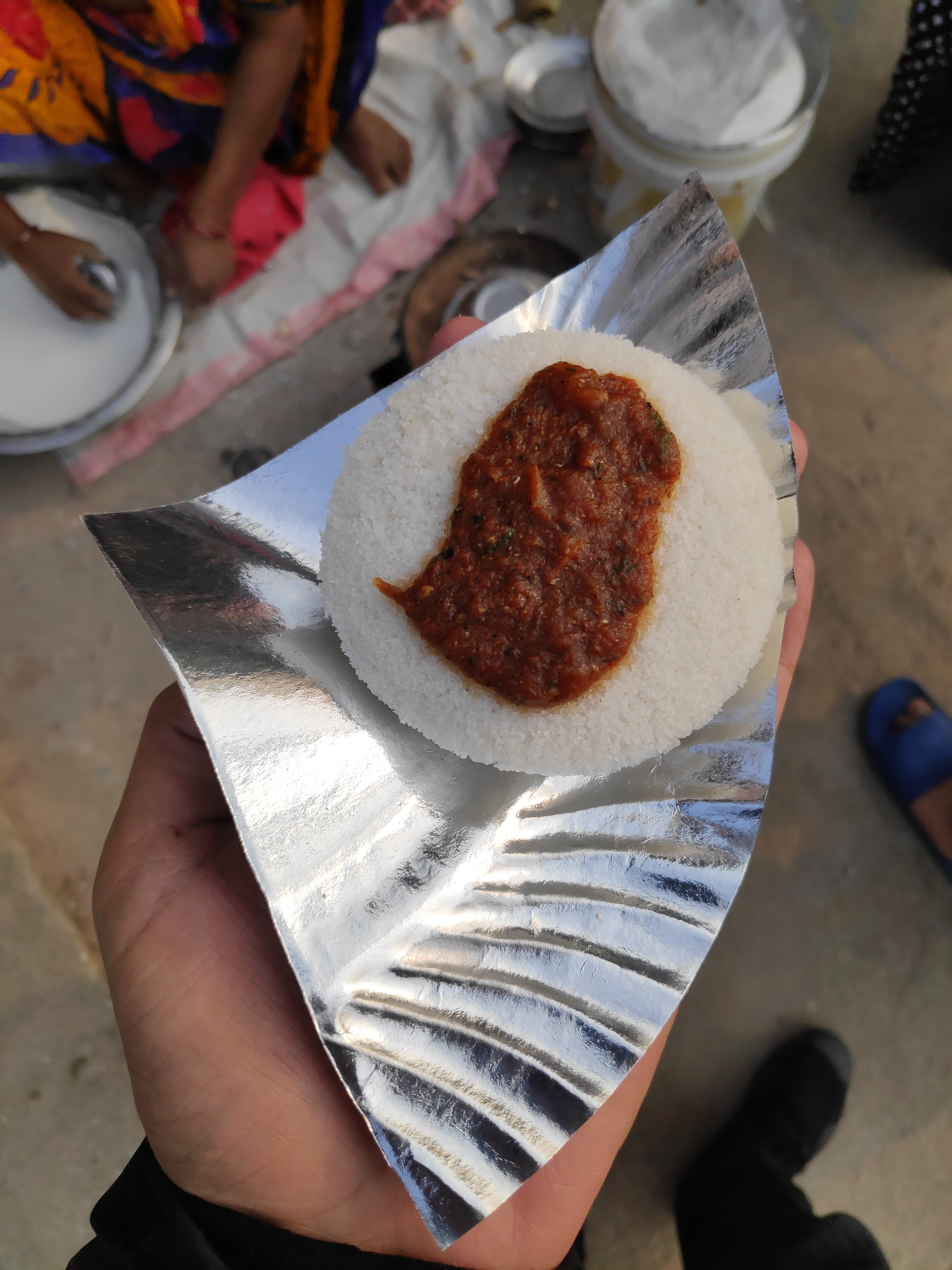
- Bhakkha, a steam rice dish, popularly made in Rajbanshi and Tharu community
- Type: cake
- Region or state: West Bengal, Bihar and Terai region of Southeastern Nepal
- Serving temperature: Hot
- Main ingredients: Rice flour

Bhakkha is a traditional food of the Rajbanshi and Tharu people from West Bengal, Seemanchal and South eastern Nepal. It is a fluffy rice cake.

Bhakkha is prepared by lightly soaking milled rice in water and massaging with palms. It is then sieved to separate sand grain sized pieces. The sieved rice grains is lightly compacted in a bowl and steamed. Traditionally, the steaming is done in a clay pot for 30 seconds or a minute depending upon the temperature of the water. It is served in breakfast or as a snack with freshly prepared tomato pickle.

== See also ==
- Idli
- Nepalese cuisine
- List of Nepalese dishes
