= Sanyaa =

Dish in Newar cuisine

Sanya Khuna is a traditional Newari dish from Nepal, made using dried fish. It is a unique type of curry, notable for its gelatinous texture after preparation. This dish is a hallmark of Newar cuisine, particularly originating from the Newar community of the Kathmandu Valley (also known as Nepal Valley).

The preparation begins by soaking dried fish in cold water to rehydrate it. The fish is then cooked with mustard oil, spices, and water in the traditional Newari style. Once the cooking process is complete, the soup-based curry is poured into small bowls and left to cool. It is then stored in a cold place or refrigerated for at least 12 hours. During this time, the soup sets into a jelly-like consistency, which is characteristic of Sanya Khuna.

This dish holds cultural significance and is highly popular within Newar communities, often served during festivals and special occasions.

== See also ==
- List of dried foods
