= Fini roti =

Nepalese bread

- Place of origin: Nepal

Fini roti (फिनी रोटी) (literal meaning: deep-fried multi-layered flatbread) is a traditional crispy bread delicacy from Nepal, popular among the Newar community and it is usually served with curries, dal bhat, or other Nepali dishes and is also a popular snack food served in restaurants and hotels. According to Himalayan Wiki, "fini" in Newari means "thin" or "delicate" which describes the layered, flaky nature of the bread; "roti" is more generic meaning "bread" in many South Asian languages, so "fini roti" means "thin delicate bread".

Fini Roti is also made for special events like weddings and to be offered to goddess Laxmi during the festival of Tihar. It is a layered roti made with mainly flour and ghee, then deep-fried and sometimes coated with powdered sugar.

As a Newar food, Fini Roti contributes to the intangible cultural heritage of places like Lalitpur inside the Kathmandu Valley. In a government intangible heritage report, traditional breads and festival foods are documented as heritage.

== Origins ==
Fini roti originates form the Newar community, an ethnic group in the Kathmandu Valley known for having a rich culinary tradition when it comes to festival foods, sweets, breads, and ritual dishes.

== Production ==
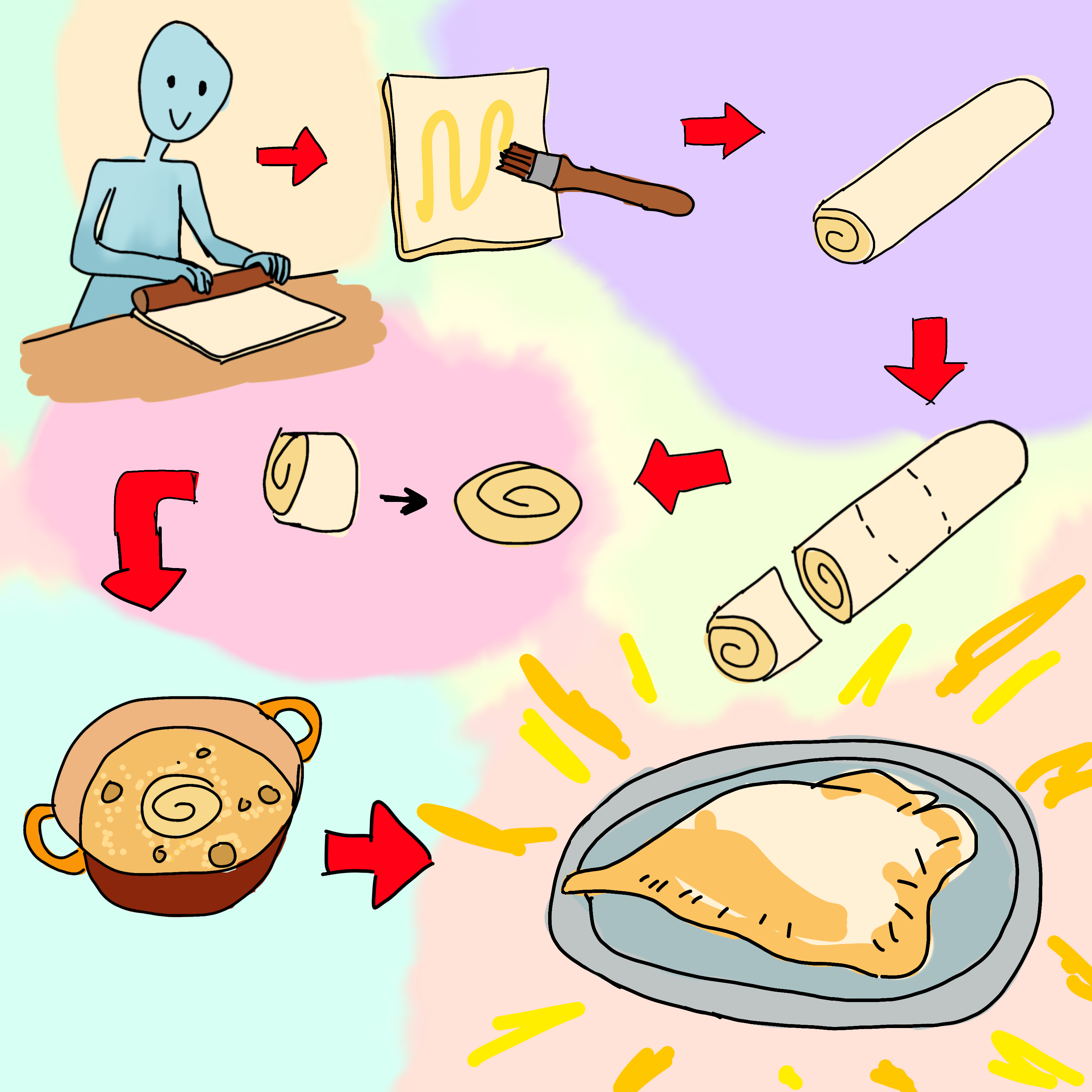
An illustration of the preparation process of fini roti

Fini roti is produced through a lamination process that gives its characteristic flaky texture. The dough is prepared from basic ingredients such as all-purpose flour, rice flour, ghee, and water, while the inner crispy layer is created by a paste (known as sat) that is made by combining rice flour and ghee. During preparation, the dough is flattened and the paste is spread on and rolled to form a log and sliced into smaller portions. When placed in oil, the dough layers separates and puffs up, producing a crisp, multi-layer structure. Some regional variations sprinkle powdered sugar on top for a sweet finish while others keep it neutral so that it can pair with savoury foods.

== Texture & Taste ==
The layering gives Fini Roti a flaky, crisp outer texture and a tender, slightly puffy interior. When fried correctly, it is very light and not overly oily if drained well. A savory/"plain" version is often served with curries, dal, or achaar (pickles) while a sweet version with powdered sugar sprinkled on top include sugar in the dough or a light syrup. Some variant recipes include cardamom for extra fragrance (Sewapoint).
