= Bhuswa =

Special dish of Mithila during Chhath Puja

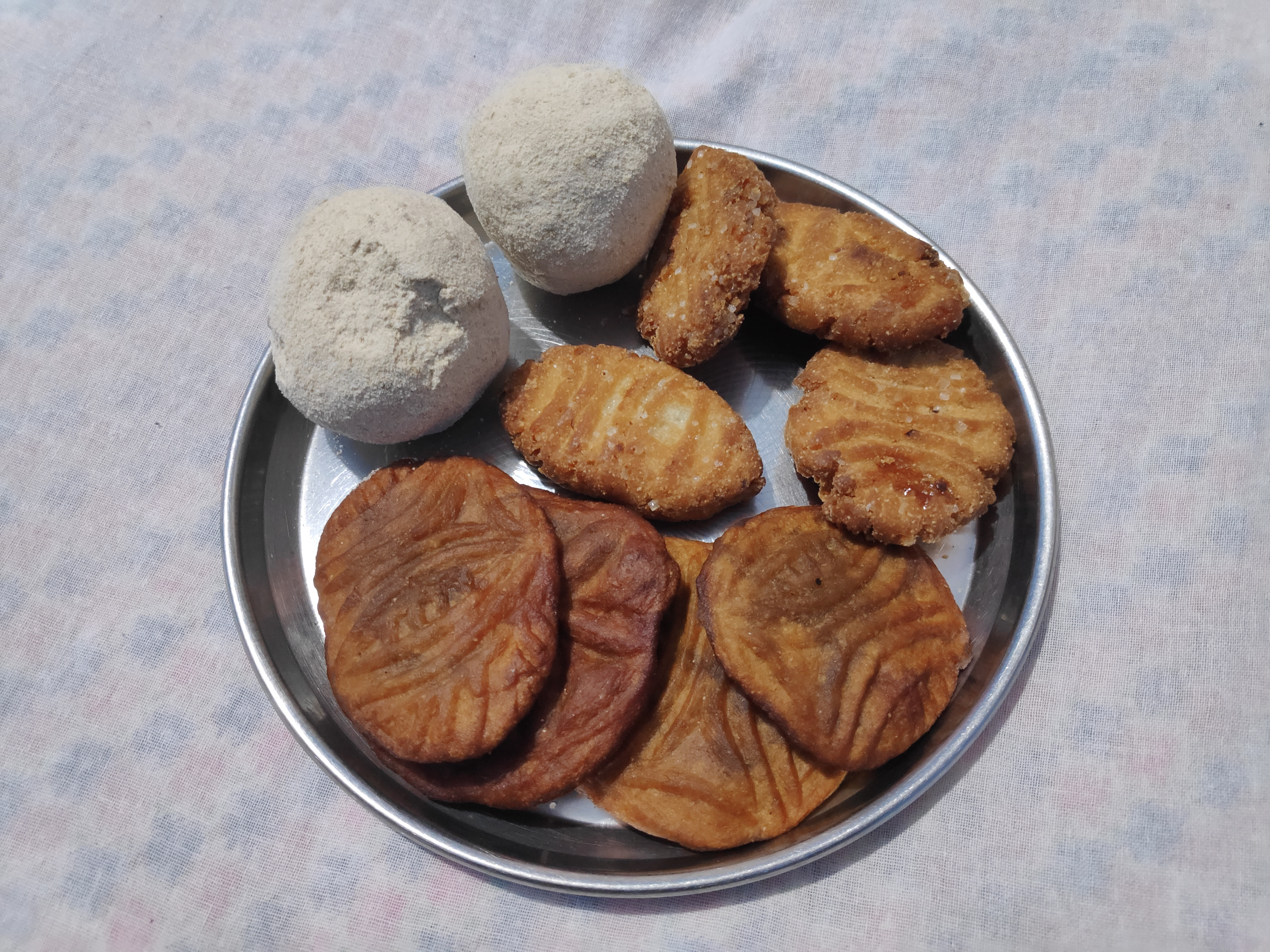
- The white round balls in the plate are Bhuswa.
- Alternative names: Bhusba
- Type: Laddu
- Course: Prasad
- Region or state: Mithila region
- Main ingredients: Ground rice

Bhuswa, (Maithili: भूसबा) also called as Bhusba, is a rice laddu in the Mithila region of the Indian subcontinent. It is generally prepared as prasad (an offering) to Lord Suryanarayana and Chhathi Maiya during the festival of Chhath Puja. After the festival rituals, the bhuswas are consumed by family and devotees.

Image of a single Bhuswa prepared by a Maithil woman on the occasion of the Chhaith Puja.

Bhuswa is made by soaking rice, which is then dried in sunlight. The dried rice is fried in ghee and ground to a powder. Jaggery powder (a type of cane sugar) and ghee are then combined to the flour to form spheres. Cardamom and dry fruits are sometimes added for flavour.
