= Khame Jatra =

Festival in Bhaktapur, Nepal

Khame Jatra or Kha Me Jatra is a festival celebrated in Bhaktapur, Nepal. It occurs on the ninth day of Dashain. It is mainly celebrated by the Newar people. A similar procession is also practised in Panauti, but it is in the form of Puja rather than a Jatra.

== Preparation ==
Kha Me means a pure male buffalo which does not have any physical wounds or defects. It must have seven chakras and its hair in the front and the middle parts should lean towards the front and the hair in back should lean towards the back. This buffalo is specially reared for the festival in the name of Bramhayani goddess by Banamala clan, a sub-group of Newar community. In case such buffalo cannot be found, a rope is tied as a symbol of Kha Me in the temple pillar.

== Main activity ==
In Dasain, the buffalo is brought to Gathemung (Dattatreya square) near the temple of goddess Durga. On the evening of the ninth day of Dasain, it is taken to the open street and chased from the Durga temple towards Bramhayani temple which lies about a kilometer away on the bank of Hanumante river. Before the chasing starts, it is made drunk by feeding alcohol.

After chasing, the buffalo is cleaned in the holy water of Hanumante river. Pilgrims also bath in the same river. A tantric ritual is performed by sprinkling holy water, rice and flowers on the body of buffalo and some tantric mantra is whispered in its ear. The buffalo is then slain as a symbol of demon Mahisasura.

The head is displayed as the demon king Mahisasura while the body is distributed as prasada. It is believed that the if the holy prasad keep the evils away from the family. The prasad is stored and burnt in the fire as incense in the Lakshmi Puja.
