= Mimosa Sugar Balls =

Sweet used as religious offering in South Asia

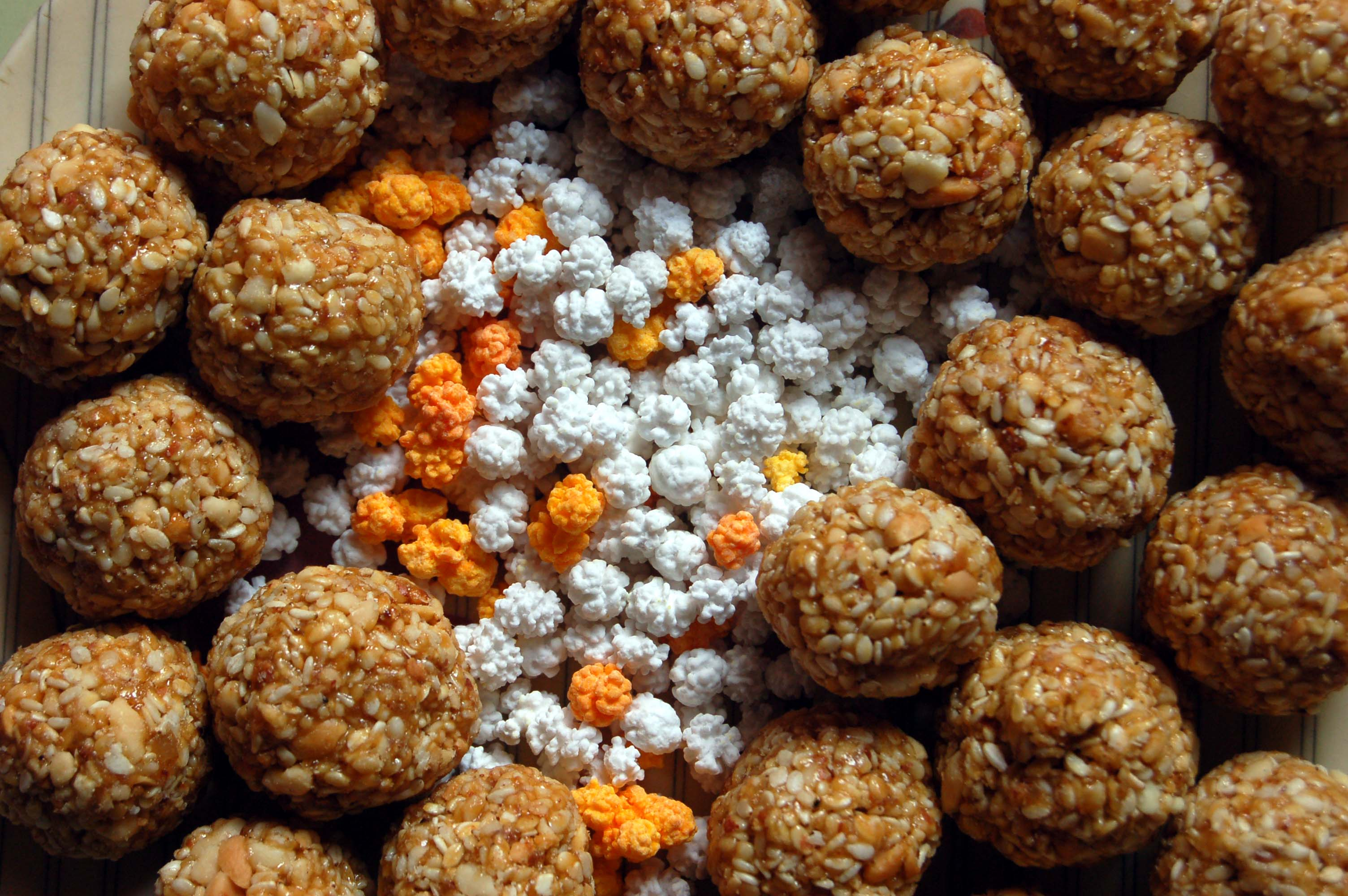
- Packet of Mimosa Sugar Balls
- Alternative names: Tarasari
- Course: Prasad
- Place of origin: India and Nepal
- Region or state: South Asia
- Main ingredients: Sugar

Mimosa Sugar Balls, also known as Prasad Dana, Gol Dana, Nakul Dana, Makaiya Laddu or Tarasari, is a small pea–sized sweet food made up of sugar. It is believed to have originated around the 1860s at the Bhairavsthan Temple in Palpa, Nepal. It is especially used in Hinduism religious ritual as an offering for the deities. It is popularly used as an offering in temples in Nepal and India.

It is generally sold in small packets. It is firstly offered to the deities alongside other worshipping materials such as Sindoor, coconut, sweets, etc. and then afterwards given to the devotees. Since, it is easily transportable and storable, it is hugely popular in most places. Its demand increases during festivals such as Durga Puja, Maha Shivaratri, etc.

== Composition ==
Mimosa Sugar Balls is made up of sugar. It is very sweet in nature. Primarily, it is white in colour but sometimes edible food colouring is added.

== See also ==
- Konpeitō, a similar but more colourful confection
