= Shikali Jatra =

Festival in Khokana, Nepal

Sikali Jatra is a religious festival of Newar people in Khokana of the Kathmandu Valley. The jatra is performed in Dashain by the people who do not celebrate the Dashain festival.

The Jatra is five-day festival dedicated to Sikali (also called Ajima), one of the deities in Hundism. Sikali is one of the sisters of goddess in Dakshinkali. Sikali's temple is located in Khokana.

In Khokana there are three major communities namely Tagu, Salagu and Jagu. On the day of Jatra, four virgin boys each from Tagu and Salagu are selected to worship Sikali. The locals wears masks to represent 14 Hindu deities. Masked dances is performed following tantric rituals. The dancers wears colourful attires. A wooden chariot of goddess Rudrayani is carried on the streets and finally set at the Sikali temple. The procession is led by a Newar priest wearing white robe.
