= Nepal Food Corporation =

Nepalese government agency

Agency overview
- Formed: 1974
- Preceding agency: Agriculture Purchase and Sales Corporation
- Jurisdiction: Government of Nepal
- Parent agency: Government of Nepal
- Website: http://www.nfc.com.np

Nepal Food Corporation (NFC) is a government-owned agency in Nepal responsible for managing the national food market and overseeing the import of essential food commodities.

== History ==
The agency was established in 1974 following a reorganization of the previous Agriculture Purchase and Sales Corporation. The restructuring split the original corporation into two separate entities: the Agriculture Input Corporation, which handles agricultural inputs, and the Nepal Food Corporation, which manages food procurement, distribution, and imports.

== Functions and operations ==
Nepal Food Corporation's primary functions include:

- Procuring essential food grains, including rice and wheat, from domestic and international sources.
- Distributing food stocks across the country, particularly in times of need or national festivals.
- Monitoring food availability and prices to maintain market stability
