= Choila =

Newari grilled buffalo dish

Chhoyela
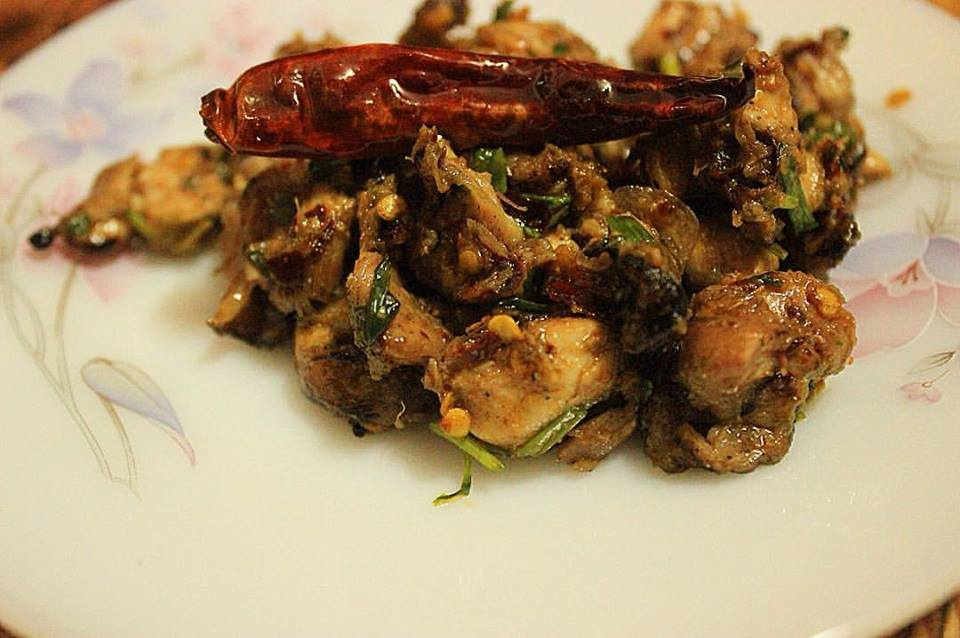
- Chicken Meat Chhoyela; Newari Cuisine
- Type: meat dish
- Place of origin: Nepal
- Region or state: Nepal Mandal
- Created by: Newar

Choila, sometimes Chhwela or Chhoyela (Nepali: छोयला) is a typical Newari dish that consists of spiced grilled buffalo meat. Though the dish is traditionally made with water buffalo meat, mutton, chicken, duck meat, and mushroom are also used in contemporary versions.There are two primary styles of preparation: Haku Choila, which is traditionally charred over a straw fire, and Mana Choila, where the meat is boiled before being spiced Usually eaten with rice flakes (chiura), this dish is typically very spicy.

It is considered a necessary part of the diet in festivals among the Newar community along with several other ingredients. It is also an important ingredient of Samay Baji.
