= Phapar ko roti =

Nepali pancake

Phapar Ko Roti
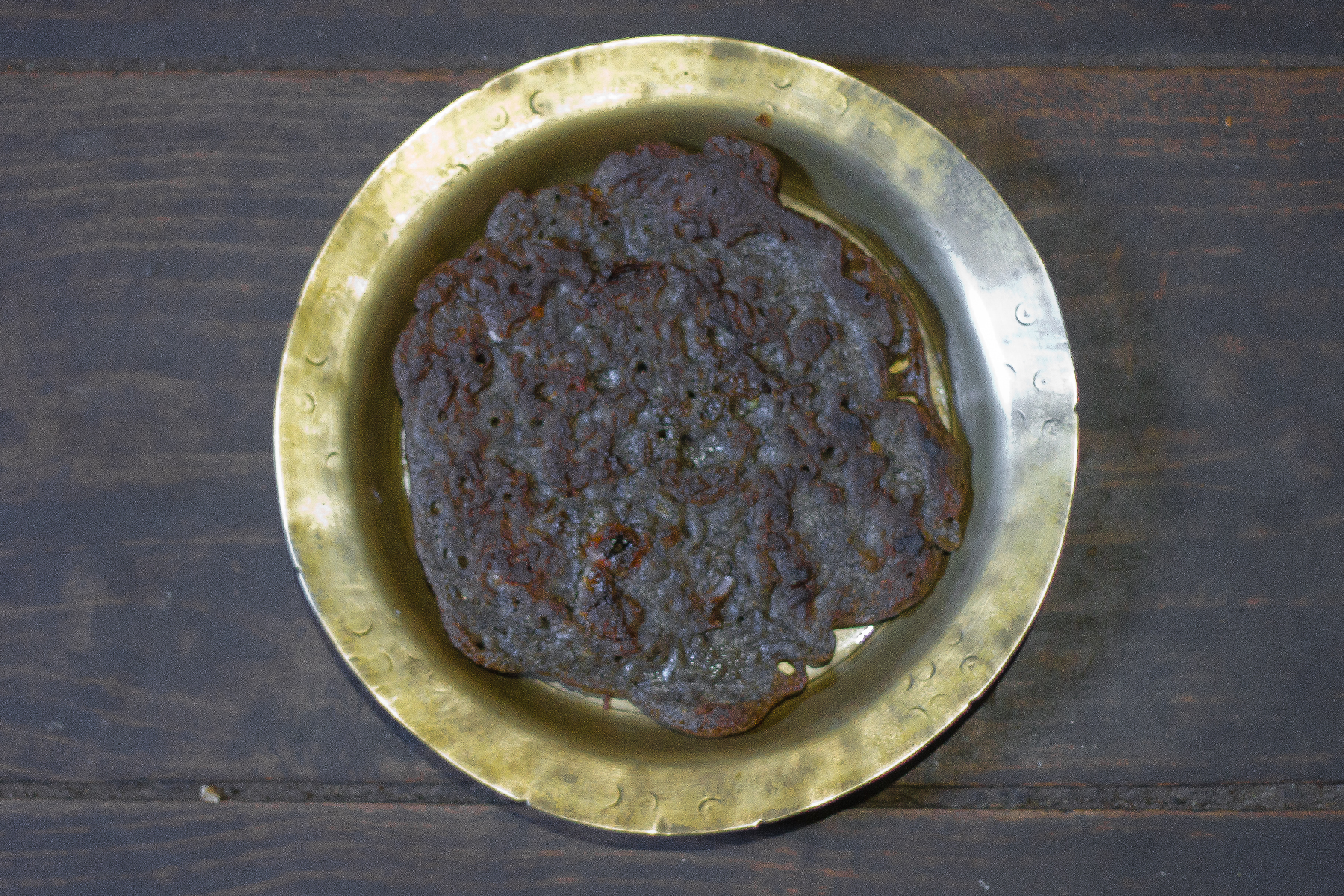
- Phapar ko Roti
- Type: Bread
- Place of origin: South Asia
- Region or state: South Asia
- Associated cuisine: Nepal, Sikkim
- Main ingredients: Buckwheat, water, sugar, butter

Phapar ko roti (Nepali: फापर को रोटि) is a traditional Nepali pancake, which Nepalis typically consume with achar (pickle) of various kinds.

== Preparation and ingredients ==
A dough of buckwheat flour with a little rice flour and ingredients including chopped vegetables, egg white, milk, and water is poured on hot ghee on a flat pan and browned in both sides.

== See also ==
- List of pancakes
- List of fried dough varieties
