= Newar festivals =

The Newas are well known for their lavish festivals. The word jatra is used for carnivals. Based on the Nepalese calendar, Nepal Sambat, the different festivals are:

- Swanti
- Sakimila Punhi
- Yoma
- Yomari Punhi
- Ghayh
- Swasthani
- Shree Panchami
- Sila Chahre
- Holi Punhi
- Pahan Charhe
- Bisket Jatra
- Jana Baha Dyah Jatra
- Bungdya Jatra
- Bhoto Jatra
- Swanya Punhi
- Sithi Nakhah
- Gathan Mugah
- Gunla
- Gunhu Punhi
- Kuchhi bhoyey
- Pancha Dan
- Yenya
- Mohani
- Mataya (Lalitpur)
