= Rakura tea =

Nepalese tea brand

Rakura is a tea brand from Himal Tea Industries, founded in 1973, a company from Nepal that launched Rakura in 2012. "Drink Health" is the company's tagline, which refers to tea as a health beneficiary drink. It provides its product in an eco-friendly way such as its decomposable tea bag.

Himal Tea Industries Pvt Ltd is one of the oldest manufacturers of Nepali tea.

== History ==
The tea estate of was founded by Ram Kumar Rathi in the late 1970s. The brand has been formed from his name Ra-Ku-Ra.
