= Pukala =

Nepalese water buffalo dish

Pukālā (Nepali: पुकाला, lit. 'fried meat') is a traditional dish of boiled and fried variety meats of the water buffalo. The dish is a delicacy in the Newar cuisine of the Kathmandu Valley in Nepal and is enjoyed during wedding and festival feasts. It is served after the main course and before dessert.

Food is an important element in Newar ritual and religious life, and specific food preparations are required for ceremonies and feasts. Pukālā is a mandatory item during festivals. Today the dish is also served as an appetizer or snack in restaurants.

== Production ==
Pukālā is made by boiling variety meats like small intestines, liver, kidney, tripe, pancreas and spleen. The meat is then sliced into 1-inch pieces and pan fried.

== See also ==
- List of Nepalese dishes
