= Aila (liquor) =

Nepalese liquor

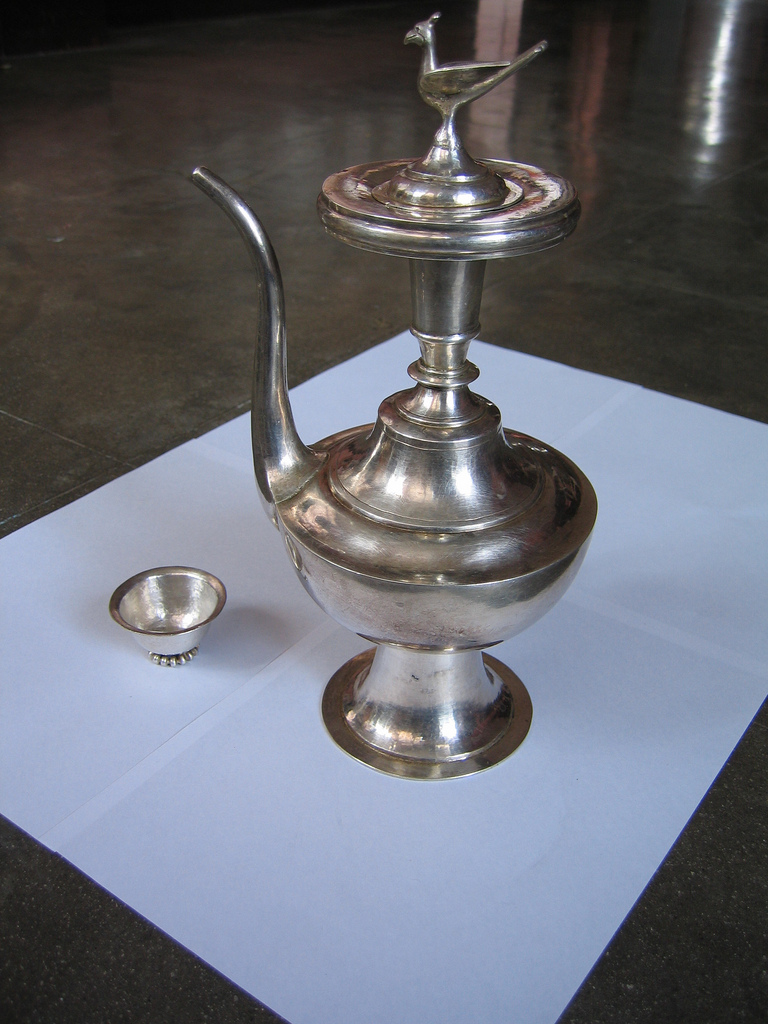
- Traditional container and cup used to serve Aila
- Course: liquor
- Place of origin: Nepal
- Main ingredients: rice, grains and millet

Aylā (Nepal Bhasa: अयला:) is a Newari beverage prepared by distillation of fermented ingredients such as rice, grains and millet. Apart from casual drinking, Aila is an important part of festivals in Nepal. This liquor is usually homemade and prepared by traditional methods. Its preparation is not yet commercial in Nepal, however it is sold in restaurants that serve Newa cuisine. It can be bought in local Newari restaurants . CNN has noted it as being one of the "50 most delicious drinks in the world".

== Preparation ==
Aila is usually prepared by Newari people before any festival or socio-cultural event. Rice along with many other ingredients is mixed with Marcha, a local organic fermenting compound, and fermented at least four to five days to ensure the preparation of a good quality Aila. Millet is used instead of rice for an even stronger flavor. The final product is obtained after distillation. This is done by using traditional clay and copper vessel designed specifically for this purpose. The raw fermented mixture is cooked over a wood fire stove. Temperature of flame and cooling water are the two factors controlling the quality of this beverage during distillation.

== Religious significance ==
Consumption of alcohol is not just allowed but generally encouraged in Newari culture. This is a religious practice promoted by Tantric traditions. According to the Tantric practices, foods are divided into three groups: mamsa (meat), matsya (fish) and madya (alcoholic beverages). It is believed that offering alcohol would satisfy the Tantric gods who in turn grant followers good luck. Aila is first offered to the gods before every religious festival and cultural activities, and then it is served. One such famous Newari festival is Yenya.

== See also ==
- Patan, Nepal
- Kathmandu Valley
- Nepal Bhasa
- Newa cuisine
- Yenya
