= Sanyaakhunya =

Newar dish

Sanyakhuna (Newari: सन्याखुना) is a special type of jelly-like food prepared and consumed primarily by the Newars of Nepal.

Buffalo stew is made with bones for extra flavor (taken out afterward) and gelatinous skin with meat attached is preferred. A good ratio of water (soup) is preferred. Spices are added. Some of the soup is taken out and juice of a local citric fruit (jhamsi in newari) which taste like lemon but with a flavor of mandarin is added for more flavor. Finally smoked dry freshwater fish is fried and added. It is cooled down to make a meat aspic jelly which is called sanyakhuna.

Sanya means dried fish and khuna means broth.
