= Swan puka =

Nepalese dish of goat's lungs

Swan pukā (Newari language: स्वँपुका, "lung fried") is a delicacy in the Newar cuisine of the Kathmandu Valley in Nepal. Swan pukā is goat's lungs filled with spicy batter and boiled, sliced and fried.

The dish is traditionally served at special dinners and feasts. It is served after the main course and before dessert. Today, swan pukā is a specialty on the menu at local eateries and more formal restaurants.

== Production ==
Goat's lungs are filled with spicy batter through the windpipe. The batter is forced into the lungs by means of a pump or by squeezing a small plastic bag filled with the liquid mixture into the opening. The lungs are patted to facilitate filling.

After the lungs are completely filled and no more batter can be pumped in, the end of the windpipe is folded and tied with a piece of string to prevent the contents from spilling out. The lungs are then boiled, sliced and pan fried.

== See also ==
- List of goat dishes
