= Chataamari =

Newar dish

Chatānmari
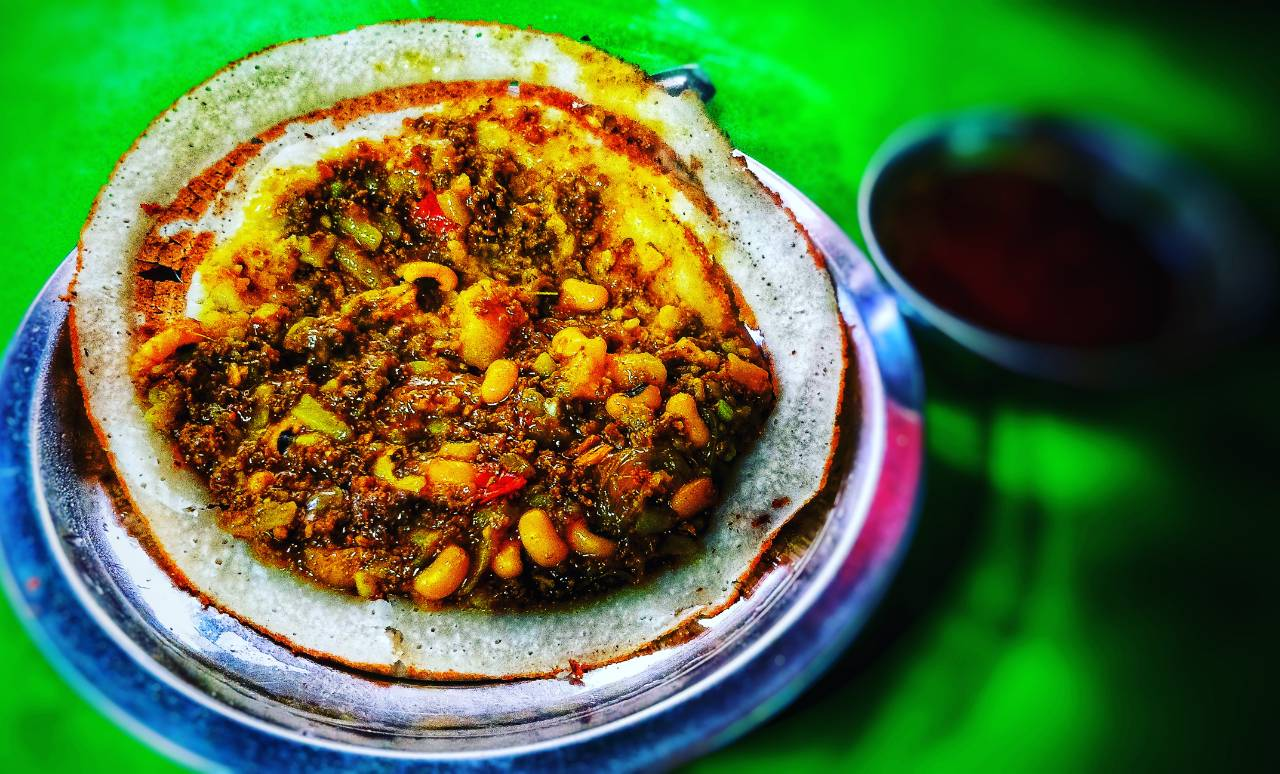
- A chatanmari topped with meat
- Alternative names: Rice pancake, Nepali pizza
- Type: Crepe
- Course: Main course
- Place of origin: Nepal
- Region or state: Kathmandu Valley
- Main ingredients: Rice flour batter
- Ingredients generally used: onions, eggs, grounded meat, spices

Chatānmari (Nepali: चतांमरि, romanized: catā̃mari, Nepal Bhasa: चतांमरि) is a Nepalese rice crepe, which is a part of Newa cuisine of the Kathmandu Valley in Nepal. It is generally eaten during festivals and other special occasions.

== See also ==
- List of pancakes
