= Diwali =

Hindu festival

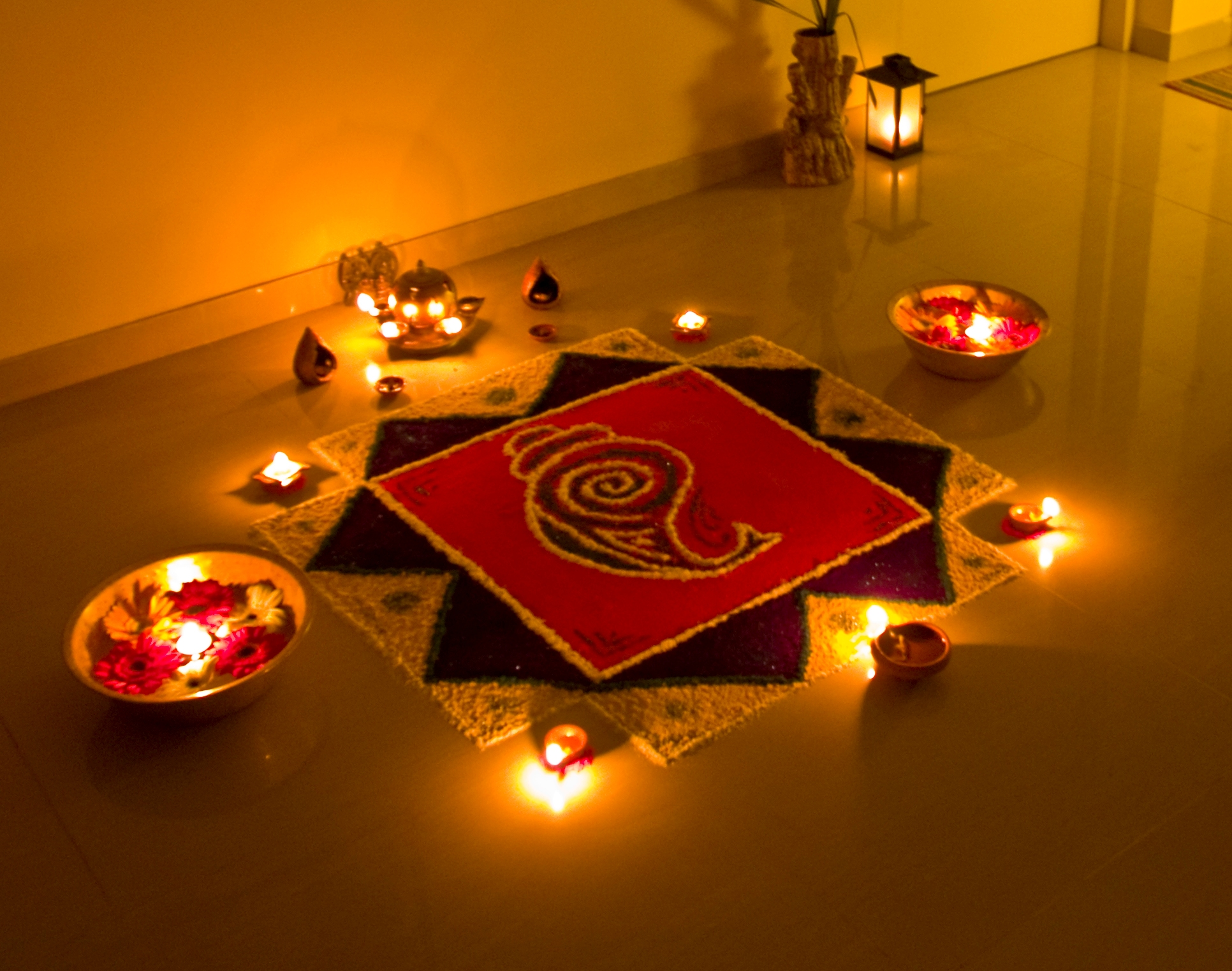
- Rangoli decorations, made using coloured fine powder or sand, are popular during Diwali.
- Official name: Dīpāvalī
- Also called: Deepavali, Deepawali
- Observed by: Hindus, Jains, Sikhs, some Buddhists (notably Newar Buddhists)
- Type: Religious, cultural, seasonal
- Significance: See below
- Celebrations: Diya lighting; puja (worship and prayer); Hukka Paati in Mithila region; havan (fire offering); vrat (fasting); dāna (charity); melā (fairs/shows); home cleansing and decoration; fireworks; gifts; and partaking in a feast and sweets
- Begins: Ashwayuja 27 or Ashwayuja 28 (amanta tradition); Kartika 12 or Kartika 13 (purnimanta tradition)
- Ends: Kartika 2 (amanta tradition); Kartika 17 (purnimanta tradition)
- Date: Ashvin Krishna Trayodashi, Ashvin Krishna Chaturdashi, Ashvin Amavasya, Kartik Shukla Pratipada, Kartik Shukla Dwitiya
- 2026 date: November: 6 (Dhanteras/Yama Deepam/Kwah Puja/Kaag Tihar); 7 (Naraka Chaturdashi/Kali Chaudas/Hanuman Puja/Chhoti Diwali/Khicha Puja/Kukur Tihar); 8 (Lakshmi Puja/Kali Puja/Sharda Puja/Kedar Gauri Vrat/Sa Puja/Gai Tihar); 9 (Govardhan Puja/Balipratipada/Mha Puja/Goru Puja); 10 (Bhai Dooj/Vishwakarma Puja/Gujarati New Year/Kija Puja)
- 2027 date: 29 October 2027
- 2028 date: 17 October 2028
- Duration: 5 or 6 days (regional variations)
- Frequency: Annual
- Related to: Diwali (Jainism), Bandi Chhor Divas, Tihar, Swanti, Sohrai, Bandna

Deepavali
- UNESCO Intangible Cultural Heritage
- Country: India
- Reference: 02312
- Region: Asia and the Pacific

Inscription history
- Inscription: 2025 (20th session)
- List: Representative

Explanatory note on Hindu festival dates
- The Hindu calendar is lunisolar but most festival dates are specified using the lunar portion of the calendar. A lunar day is uniquely identified by three calendar elements: māsa (lunar month), pakṣa (lunar fortnight) and tithi (lunar day). Furthermore, when specifying the masa, one of two traditions are applicable, viz. amānta / pūrṇimānta. If a festival falls in the waning phase of the moon, these two traditions identify the same lunar day as falling in two different (but successive) masa. A lunar year is shorter than a solar year by about eleven days. As a result, most Hindu festivals occur on different days in successive years on the Gregorian calendar.

Dipavali (IAST: Dīpāvalī), (Note: Also spelled as Dipawali, Deepavali, or Deepawali.) commonly known as Diwali (/dɪˈwɑːliː/), is the Hindu festival of lights, with variations celebrated in other Indian religions such as Jainism and Sikhism. (Note: Related to Jain Diwali, Bandi Chhor Divas, Tihar, Swanti, Sohrai and Bandna) It is associated with the spiritual victory or triumph of Dharma over Adharma, light over darkness, good over evil, and knowledge over ignorance. Diwali is celebrated during the Hindu lunisolar months of Ashvin (according to the amanta tradition) and Kārtika – between around mid-October and mid-November. The celebrations generally last five or six days.

Diwali is connected to various religious events, deities, and personalities, such as being the day Rama returned to his kingdom in Ayodhya with his wife Sita and his brother Lakshmana after defeating the demon king Ravana. It is also widely associated with Lakshmi, the goddess of prosperity, and Ganesha, the god of wisdom and the remover of obstacles. Other regional traditions connect the holiday to Vishnu, Krishna, Durga, Shiva, Kali, Hanuman, Kubera, Yama, Yami, Dhanvantari, or Vishvakarman.

Primarily a Hindu festival, variations of Diwali are also celebrated by adherents of other faiths. The Jains observe their own Diwali which marks the final liberation of Mahavira. The Sikhs celebrate Bandi Chhor Divas to mark the release of Guru Hargobind from a Mughal prison. Newar Buddhists, unlike other Buddhists, celebrate Diwali by worshipping Lakshmi, while the Hindus of Eastern India and Bangladesh generally, celebrate Diwali by worshipping the goddess Kali.

During the festival, celebrants illuminate their homes, temples and workspaces with diyas (oil lamps), candles, and lanterns. Hindus, in particular, have a ritual oil bath at dawn on each day of the festival. Diwali is also marked with fireworks as well as the decoration of floors with rangoli designs and other parts of the house with jhalars. Food is a major focus, with families partaking in feasts and sharing mithai. The festival is an annual homecoming and bonding period not only for families but also for communities and associations, particularly those in urban areas, which organise activities, events, and gatherings. Many towns organise community parades and fairs, as well as music and dance performances in parks. Some Hindus, Jains, and Sikhs send Diwali greeting cards to family members near and far during the festive season, occasionally with boxes of Indian confectionery. Another aspect of the festival is remembering the ancestors.

Diwali is also a major cultural event for the Hindu, Sikh, and Jain diaspora. The main day of the festival of Diwali (the day of Lakshmi Puja) is an official holiday in Fiji, Guyana, India, Malaysia, (Note: except Sarawak) Mauritius, Myanmar, Nepal, Pakistan, Singapore, Sri Lanka, Suriname, and Trinidad and Tobago, and symbolically in the US states of Connecticut, Pennsylvania, and California.

== Etymology ==
Diwali (Note: Also spelled as Divali or Dewali.) comes from Dipavali (Sanskrit: दीपावली, romanized: Dīpāvalī), meaning 'a row or series of lights'. The term is a compound of the Sanskrit words दीप, dīpa, 'lamp, light, lantern, candle, that which glows, shines, illuminates or knowledge' and आवलि, āvali, 'a row, range, continuous line, series'. (Note: The holiday is known as dipawoli in Assamese: দীপাৱলী, dīpabolī or dipali in Bengali: দীপাবলি/দীপালি, dīvāḷi in Gujarati: દિવાળી, divālī in Hindi: दिवाली, dīpavaḷi in Kannada: ದೀಪಾವಳಿ, Konkani: दिवाळी, dīpāvalī in Maithili: दीपावली, Malayalam: ദീപാവലി, Marathi: दिवाळी, dīpābali in Odia: ଦୀପାବଳି, dīvālī in Punjabi: ਦੀਵਾਲੀ, diyārī in Sindhi: दियारी, tīpāvaḷi in Tamil: தீபாவளி, and Telugu: దీపావళి, Galungan in Balinese and Swanti in Nepali: स्वन्ति or tihar in Nepali: तिहार and Thudar Parba in Tulu: ತುಡರ್ ಪರ್ಬ.)

== Dates ==
The five-day celebration is observed every year sometime between the second half of October to the first half of November coinciding with a new moon (amāvasyā) as per the Hindu lunisolar calendar.

The festivities begin two days before amāvasyā, on Dhanteras, and extend two days after, until the second (or 17th) day of the month of Kartik. (According to Indologist Constance Jones, this night ends the lunar month of Ashwin and starts the month of Kartik – but see this note (Note: Historical records appear inconsistent about the name of the lunar month in which Diwali is observed. One of the earliest reports on this variation was by Wilson in 1847. He explained that though the actual Hindu festival day is the same, it is identified differently in regional calendars because there are two traditions in the Hindu calendar. One tradition starts a new month from the new moon, while the other starts it from the full moon.) and Amanta and Purnima systems.) The darkest night is the apex of the celebration.

The festival climax is on the third day, which is called the main Diwali. It is an official holiday in a dozen countries, while the other festive days are regionally observed as either public or optional restricted holidays in India. In Nepal, it is also a multiday festival, although the days and rituals are named differently, with the climax being called the Tihar festival by Hindus and the Swanti festival by Buddhists.

== History ==
The five-day festival originated in the Indian subcontinent and is likely a combination of harvest festivals from ancient India. It is mentioned in early Sanskrit texts, such as the Padma Purana and the Skanda Purana, both of which were composed between the 7th and 10th centuries. The diyas (lamps) are mentioned in Skanda Kishore Purana as symbols of the sun, which is described as the cosmic giver of light and energy to all life and the sun also undergoes seasonal transitions in the Hindu calendar month of Kartik.

Emperor Harsha referred to Deepavali in the 7th-century Sanskrit play Nagananda as Dīpapratipadotsava (dīpa = light, pratipadā = first day, utsava = festival), during this festival, lamps were lit and newly engaged brides and grooms received gifts. Rajasekhara referred to Deepavali as Dipamalika in his 9th-century Kavyamimamsa, wherein he described the tradition of whitewashing and decorating homes, streets, and markets with oil lamps at night.

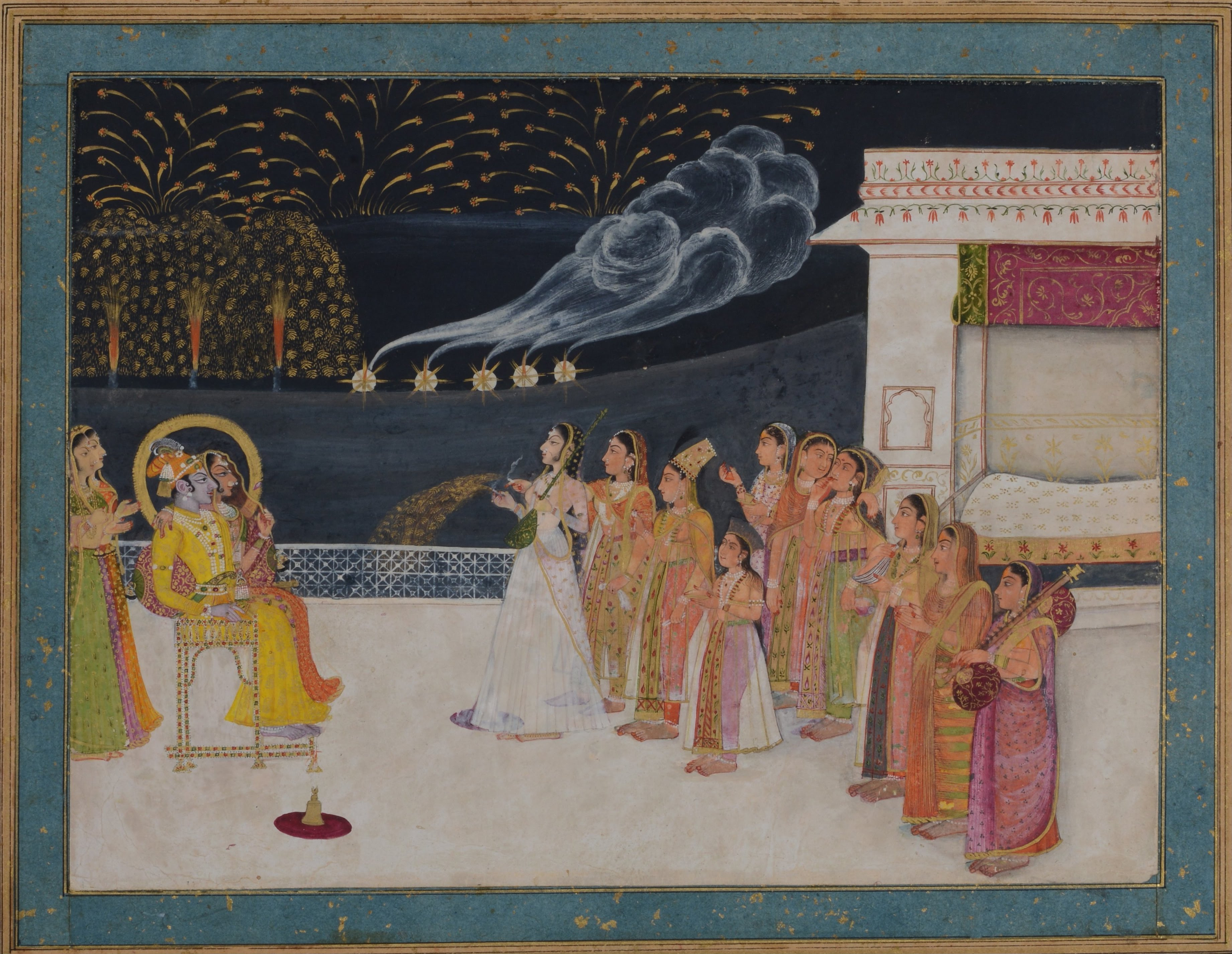
Radha and Krishna celebrating Diwali by Sitaram. Kishangarh, late 18th-century. National Museum, New Delhi

Diwali was also described by several travellers from outside India. In his 11th-century account of India, the Persian traveller and historian Al Biruni wrote that Deepavali was celebrated by Hindus on the day of the new moon in the month of Kartika. The Venetian merchant and traveller Niccolò de' Conti visited India in the early 15th century and wrote about his memoir, "on another of these festivals they fix up within their temples, and on the outside of the roofs, an innumerable number of oil lamps ... which are kept burning day and night" and that the families would gather, "clothe themselves in new garments", sing, dance, and feast. The 16th-century Portuguese traveller Domingo Paes wrote of his visit to the Hindu Vijayanagara Empire, where Dipavali was celebrated in October with householders illuminating their homes, and their temples, with lamps. It is mentioned in the Ramayana that Diwali was celebrated for only 2 years in Ayodhya.

Islamic historians of the Delhi Sultanate and the Mughal Empire eras also mentioned Diwali and other Hindu festivals. A few Mughal rulers, notably emperor Akbar, welcomed and participated in the festivities, whereas others, such as Aurangzeb, banned festivals like Diwali and Holi in 1665. (Note: According to Audrey Truschke, the Sunni Muslim emperor Aurangzeb did limit "public observation" of many religious holidays such as Hindu Diwali and Holi, but also of Shia observance of Muharram and the Persian holiday of Nauruz. According to Truschke, Aurangzeb did so because he found the festivals "distasteful" and also from "concerns with public safety" lurking in the background. According to Stephen Blake, a part of the reason that led Aurangzeb to ban Diwali was the practice of gambling and drunken celebrations. Truschke states that Aurangzeb did not ban private practices altogether and instead "rescinded taxes previously levied on Hindu festivals" by his Mughal predecessors. John Richards disagrees and states Aurangzeb, in his zeal to revive Islam and introduce strict Sharia in his empire, issued a series of edicts against Hindu festivals and shrines. According to Richards, it was Akbar who abolished the discriminatory taxes on Hindu festivals and pilgrims, and it was Aurangzeb who reinstated the Mughal era discriminatory taxes on festivals and increased other religion-based taxes.) (Note: Some Muslims joined the Hindu community in celebrating Diwali in the Mughal era. Illustrative Islamic records, states Stephen Blake, include those of 16th-century Sheikh Ahmad Sirhindi who wrote, "during Diwali.... the ignorant ones amongst Muslims, particularly women, perform the ceremonies... they celebrate it like their own Id and send presents to their daughters and sisters,.... they attach much importance and weight to this season [of Diwali].") During the late Mughal Empire, Diwali was an official state festival celebrated extravagantly in the capital, Delhi (Shahjahanabad), and known as Jashn-e-Chiraghan.

Publications from the time of the British Raj also made mention of Diwali, such as the note on Hindu festivals published in 1799 by Sir William Jones, a philologist known for his early observations on Sanskrit and Indo-European languages. In his paper on The Lunar Year of the Hindus, Jones, then based in Bengal, noted four of the five days of Diwali in the autumn months of Aswina-Cartica [sic] as the following: Bhutachaturdasi Yamaterpanam (2nd day), Lacshmipuja dipanwita (the day of Diwali), Dyuta pratipat Belipuja (4th day), and Bhratri dwitiya (5th day). The Lacshmipuja dipanwita, remarked Jones, was a "great festival at night, in honour of Lakshmi, with illuminations on trees and houses". (Note: Williams Jones stated that the Bhutachaturdasi Yamaterpanam is dedicated to Yama and ancestral spirits, the Lacshmipuja dipanwita to goddess Lakshmi with invocations to Kubera, the Dyuta pratipat Belipuja to Shiva-Parvati and Bali legends, and the Bhratri dwitiya to Yama-Yamuna legend and the Hindus celebrate the brother-sister relationship on this day. Jones also noted that on the Diwali day, the Hindus had a mock cremation ceremony with "torches and flaming brands" called Ulcadanam, where they said goodbye to their colleagues who had died in war or in a foreign country and had never returned home. The ceremony lit the path of the missing to the mansion of Yama.)

=== Epigraphy ===
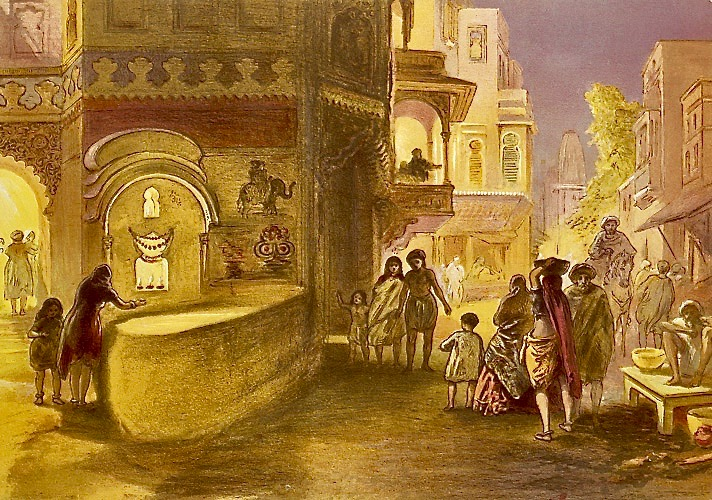
William Simpson labelled his chromolithograph of 1867 as "Dewali, feast of lamps". It showed streets lit up at dusk, with a girl and her mother lighting a street corner lamp.

Sanskrit inscriptions in stone and copper mentioning Diwali, occasionally alongside terms such as Dipotsava, Dipavali, Divali and Divalige, have been discovered at numerous sites across India. (Note: Some inscriptions mention the festival of lights in Prakrit terms such as tipa-malai, sara-vilakku and others.) Examples include a 10th-century Rashtrakuta empire copper plate inscription of Krishna III (939–967 CE) that mentions Dipotsava, and a 12th-century mixed Sanskrit-Kannada Sinda inscription discovered in the Isvara temple of Dharwad in Karnataka where the inscription refers to the festival as a "sacred occasion". According to Lorenz Franz Kielhorn, a German Indologist known for translating many Indic inscriptions, this festival is mentioned as Dipotsavam in verses 6 and 7 of the Ranganatha temple Sanskrit inscription of the 13th-century Venad Hindu king Ravivarman Samgramadhira. Part of the inscription, as translated by Kielhorn, reads:

the auspicious festival of lights which disperses the most profound darkness, which in former days was celebrated by the kings Ila, Kartavirya and Sagara, (...) as Sakra (Indra) is of the gods, the universal monarch who knows the duties by the three Vedas, afterwards celebrated here at Ranga for Vishnu, resplendent with Lakshmi resting on his radiant lap. (Note: The Sanskrit inscription is in the Grantha script. It is well preserved on the north wall of the second prakara in the Ranganatha temple, Srirangam island, Tamil Nadu.)

Jain inscriptions, such as the 10th-century Saundatti inscription about a donation of oil to Jinendra worship for the Diwali rituals, speak of Dipotsava. Another early 13th-century Sanskrit stone inscription, written in the Devanagari script, has been found in the north end of a mosque pillar in Jalore, Rajasthan evidently built using materials from a demolished Jain temple. The inscription states that Ramachandracharya built and dedicated a drama performance hall, with a golden cupola, on Diwali. (Note: The Diwali-related inscription is the 4th inscription and it includes the year Vikrama Era 1268 (c. 1211 CE).)

== Religious significance ==
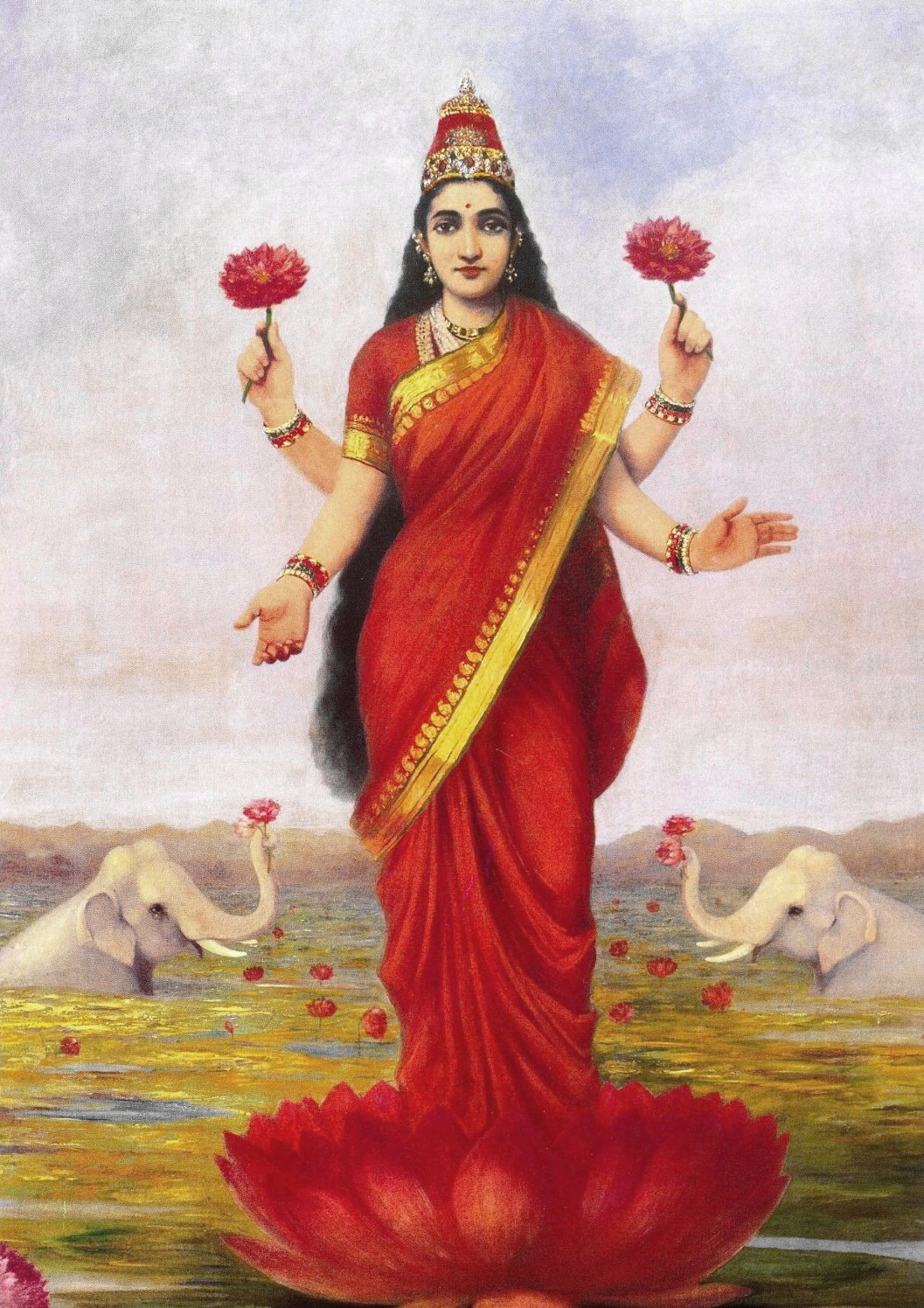
Diwali is commonly celebrated in the honour of Lakshmi, the goddess of wealth.

The religious significance of Diwali varies regionally within India. One tradition links the festival to legends in the Hindu epic Ramayana, where Diwali is the day Rama, Sita, Lakshmana, and Hanuman reached Ayodhya after a period of 14 years in exile, following the defeat of the demon king Ravana and his army.” Throughout the epic, Rama's decisions were always in line with dharma (duty) and the Diwali festival serves as a reminder for followers of Hinduism to maintain their dharma in day-to-day life.

Per another popular tradition, in the Dvapara Yuga period, Krishna, an avatar of Vishnu, killed the demon Narakasura, who was the evil king of Pragjyotishapura, near present-day Assam, and released 16000 girls held captive by Narakasura. Diwali was celebrated as a signifier of triumph of good over evil after Krishna's victory over Narakasura. The day before Diwali is remembered as Naraka Chaturdashi, the day on which Narakasura was killed by Krishna.

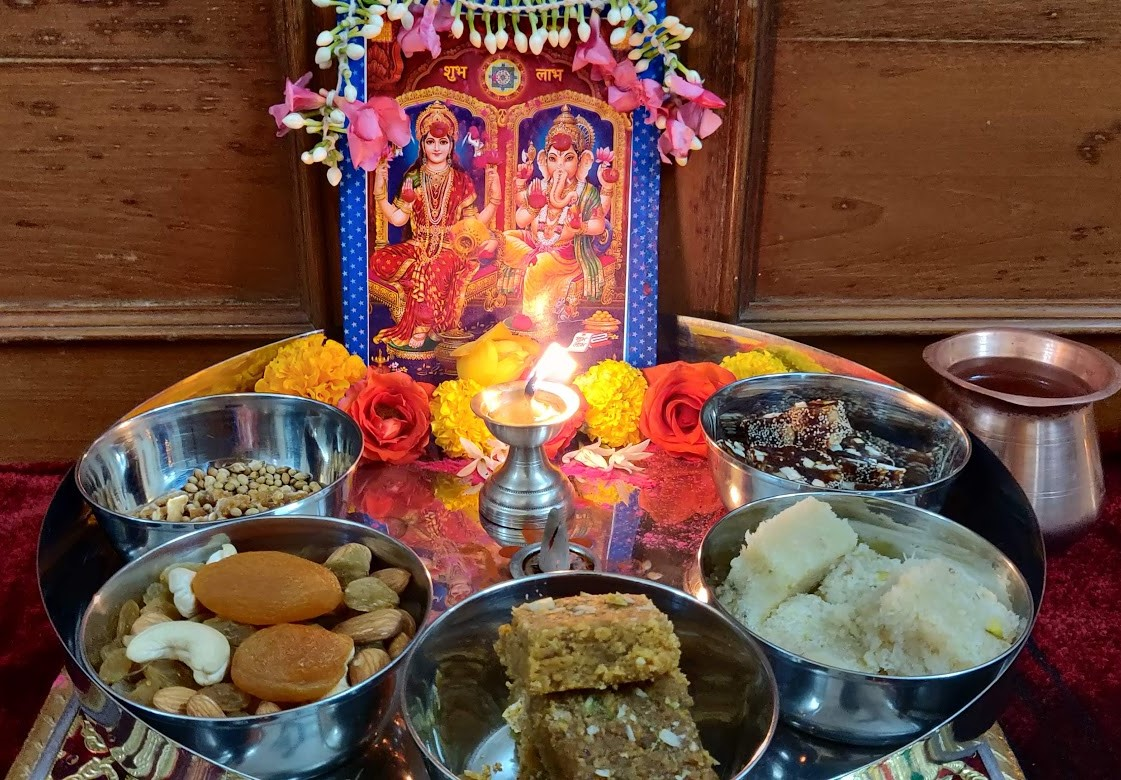
A picture of Lakshmi and Ganesha worship during Diwali

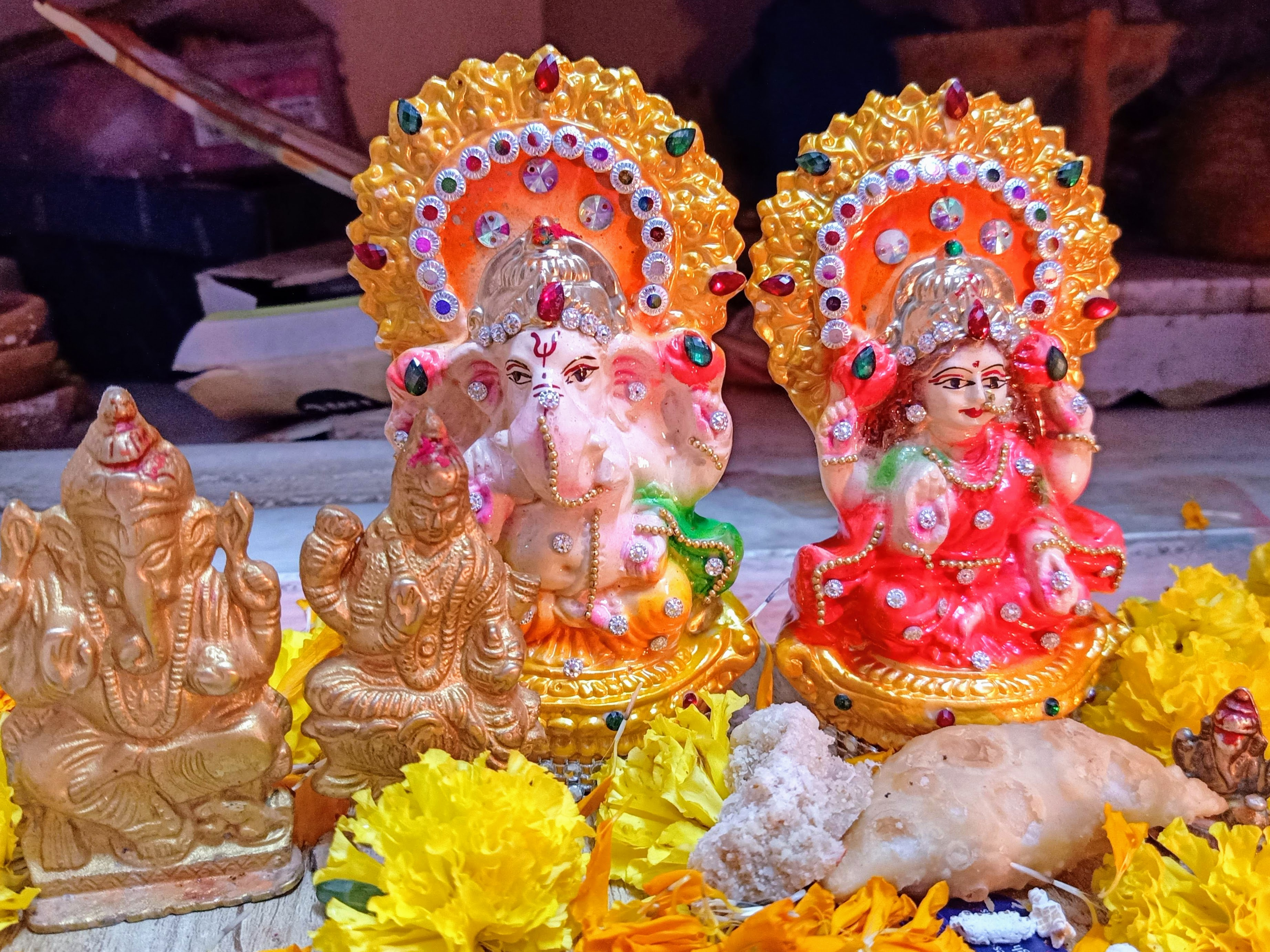
Diwali Ganesh Laxmi Puja

Many Hindus associate the festival with Lakshmi, the goddess of wealth and prosperity and wife of Vishnu. According to Pintchman, the start of the five-day Diwali festival is stated in some popular contemporary sources as the day Lakshmi was born from Samudra Manthana, the churning of the cosmic ocean of milk by the Devas (gods) and the Asuras (demons) – a Vedic legend that is also found in several Puranas such as the Padma Purana, while the night of Diwali is when Lakshmi chose and wed Vishnu. Along with Lakshmi, who is representative of Vaishnavism, Ganesha, the elephant-headed son of Parvati and Shiva of Shaivism tradition, is remembered as one who symbolises ethical beginnings and the remover of obstacles.

Hindus of eastern India associate the festival with the goddess Kali, who symbolises the victory of good over evil. Hindus from the Braj region in northern India, parts of Assam, as well as southern Tamil and Telugu communities view Diwali as the day the god Krishna overcame and destroyed the evil demon king Narakasura, in yet another symbolic victory of knowledge and good over ignorance and evil.

Trade and merchant families and others also offer prayers to Saraswati, who embodies music, literature and learning and Kubera, who symbolises bookkeeping, treasury and wealth management. In western states such as Gujarat, and certain northern Hindu communities of India, the festival of Diwali signifies the start of a new year.

Mythical tales shared on Diwali vary widely depending on region and even within Hindu tradition, yet all share a common focus on righteousness, self-inquiry and the importance of knowledge, which, according to Lindsey Harlan, an Indologist and scholar of religious studies, is the path to overcoming the "darkness of ignorance". The telling of these myths is reminiscent of the Hindu belief that good ultimately triumphs over evil.

=== Other religions ===
Originally a Hindu festival, Diwali has transcended religious lines. Diwali is celebrated by Hindus, Jains, Sikhs, and Newar Buddhists, although for each faith it marks different historical events and stories, but nonetheless the festival represents the same symbolic victory of light over darkness, knowledge over ignorance, and good over evil.

==== Jainism ====
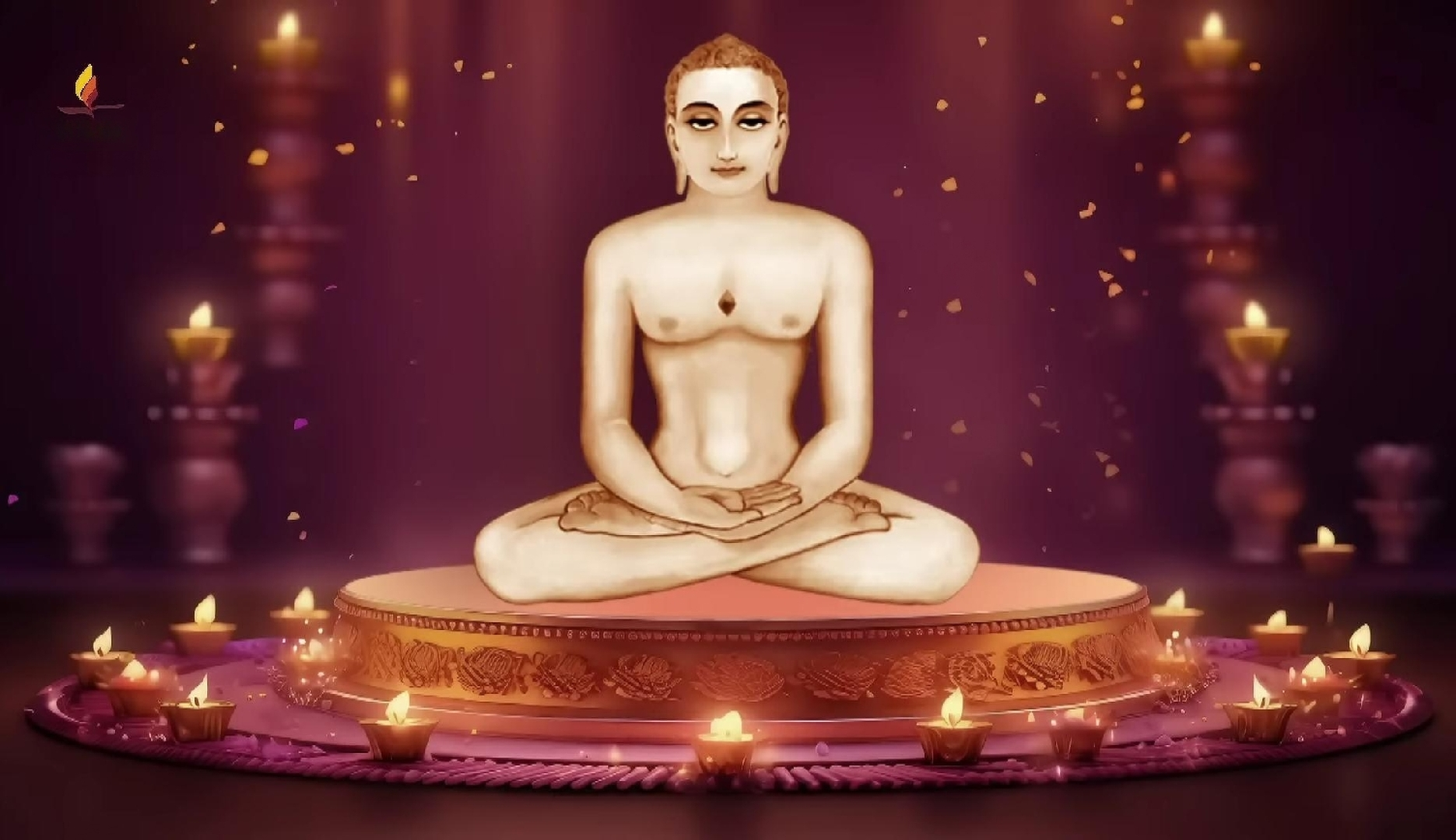
Lord Mahavir in meditation before attaining nirvana, the day is celebrated by Jains as Dipalikaya

In Jain religion, Diwali is celebrated in observance of "Mahavira Nirvana Divas", the physical death and final nirvana of Mahavira, the 24th Tirthankar of current time cycle. Nirvana is considered to be the state of a soul when it escapes from the cycle of birth and death, while experiencing its true nature of boundless bliss and infinite knowledge. The Jain Diwali celebrated in many parts of India has similar practices to the Hindu Diwali, such as the lighting of lamps. However, the focus of the Jain Diwali remains the dedication to Mahavira. According to the Jain tradition, this practice of lighting lamps first began on the day of Mahavira's nirvana in 527 BCE, (Note: Scholars contest the 527 BCE date and consider Mahavira's biographical details as uncertain. Some suggest he lived in the 5th-century BCE contemporaneously with the Buddha.) when 18 kings who had gathered for Mahavira's final teachings issued a proclamation that lamps be lit in remembrance of the "great light, Mahavira". This traditional belief of the origin of Diwali, and its significance to Jains, is reflected in their historic artworks such as paintings.

==== Sikhism ====
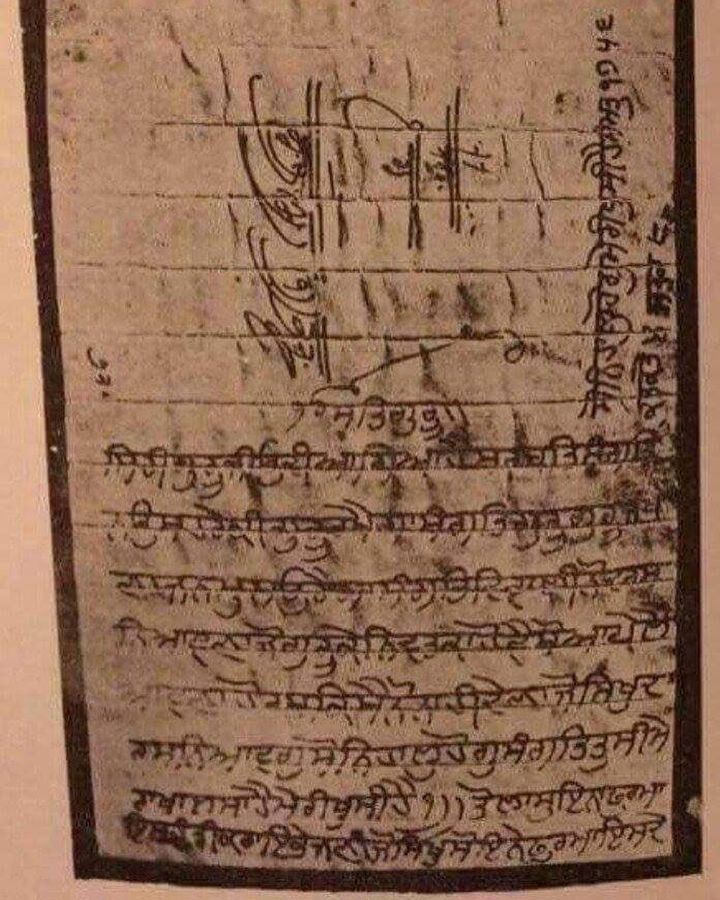
A hukamnama from the tenth Sikh guru, Guru Gobind Singh, requesting all of the Sikh congregation to convene in his presence on the occasion of Diwali

Sikhs celebrate Bandi Chhor Divas in remembrance of the release of Guru Hargobind from the Gwalior Fort prison by the Mughal emperor Jahangir and the day he arrived at the Golden Temple in Amritsar. According to J.S. Grewal, a scholar of Sikhism and Sikh history, Diwali in the Sikh tradition is older than the sixth Guru Hargobind legend. Guru Amar Das, the third Guru of the Sikhs, built a well in Goindwal with eighty-four steps and invited Sikhs to bathe in its sacred waters on Baisakhi and Diwali as a form of community bonding. Over time, these spring and autumn festivals became the most important of Sikh festivals and holy sites such as Amritsar became focal points for annual pilgrimages. The festival of Diwali, according to Ray Colledge, highlights three events in Sikh history: the founding of the city of Amritsar in 1577, the release of Guru Hargobind from the Mughal prison, and the day of Bhai Mani Singh's martyrdom in 1738 as a result of his failure to pay a fine for trying to celebrate Diwali and thereafter refusing to convert to Islam. (Note: Sikhs historically referred to this festival as Diwali. It was in early 20th-century, states Harjot Oberoi, a scholar of Sikh history, when the Khalsa Tract Society triggered by the Singh Sabha Movement sought to establish a Sikh identity distinct from the Hindus and the Muslims. They launched a sustained campaign to discourage Sikhs from participating in Holi and Diwali, renaming the festivals, publishing the seasonal greeting cards in the Gurmukhi language and relinking their religious significance to Sikh historical events. While some of these efforts have had a lasting impact for the Sikh community, the lighting, feasting together, social bonding, sharing and other ritual grammar of Sikh celebrations during the Diwali season are similar to those of the Hindus and Jains.)

==== Buddhism ====
Diwali is not a festival for most Buddhists, with the exception of the Newar people of Nepal who revere various deities in Vajrayana Buddhism and celebrate Diwali by offering prayers to Lakshmi. Newar Buddhists in Nepalese valleys also celebrate the Diwali festival over five days, in much the same way, and on the same days, as the Nepalese Hindu Diwali-Tihar festival. According to some observers, this traditional celebration by Newar Buddhists in Nepal, through the worship of Lakshmi and Vishnu during Diwali, is not syncretism but rather a reflection of the freedom within Mahayana Buddhist tradition to worship any deity for their worldly betterment.

== Celebrations ==
Diwali celebrations
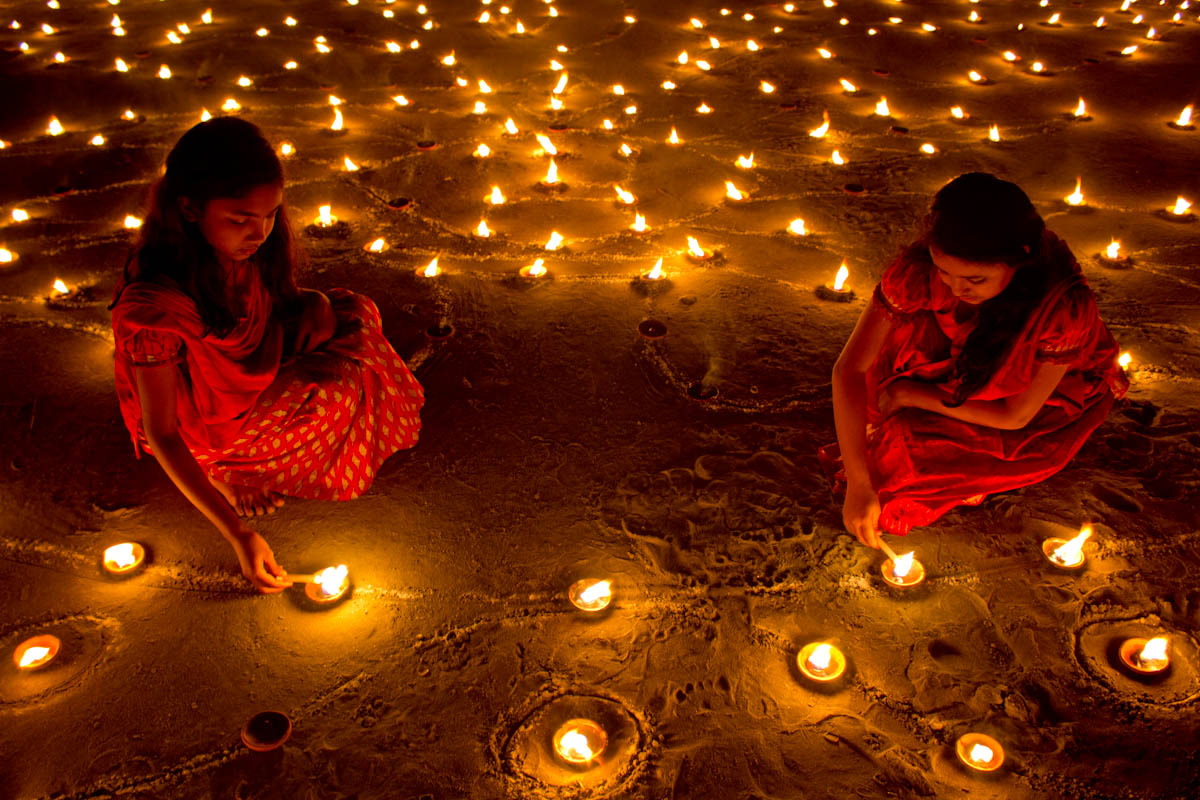
Hindu girls lighting diyas in Bangladesh

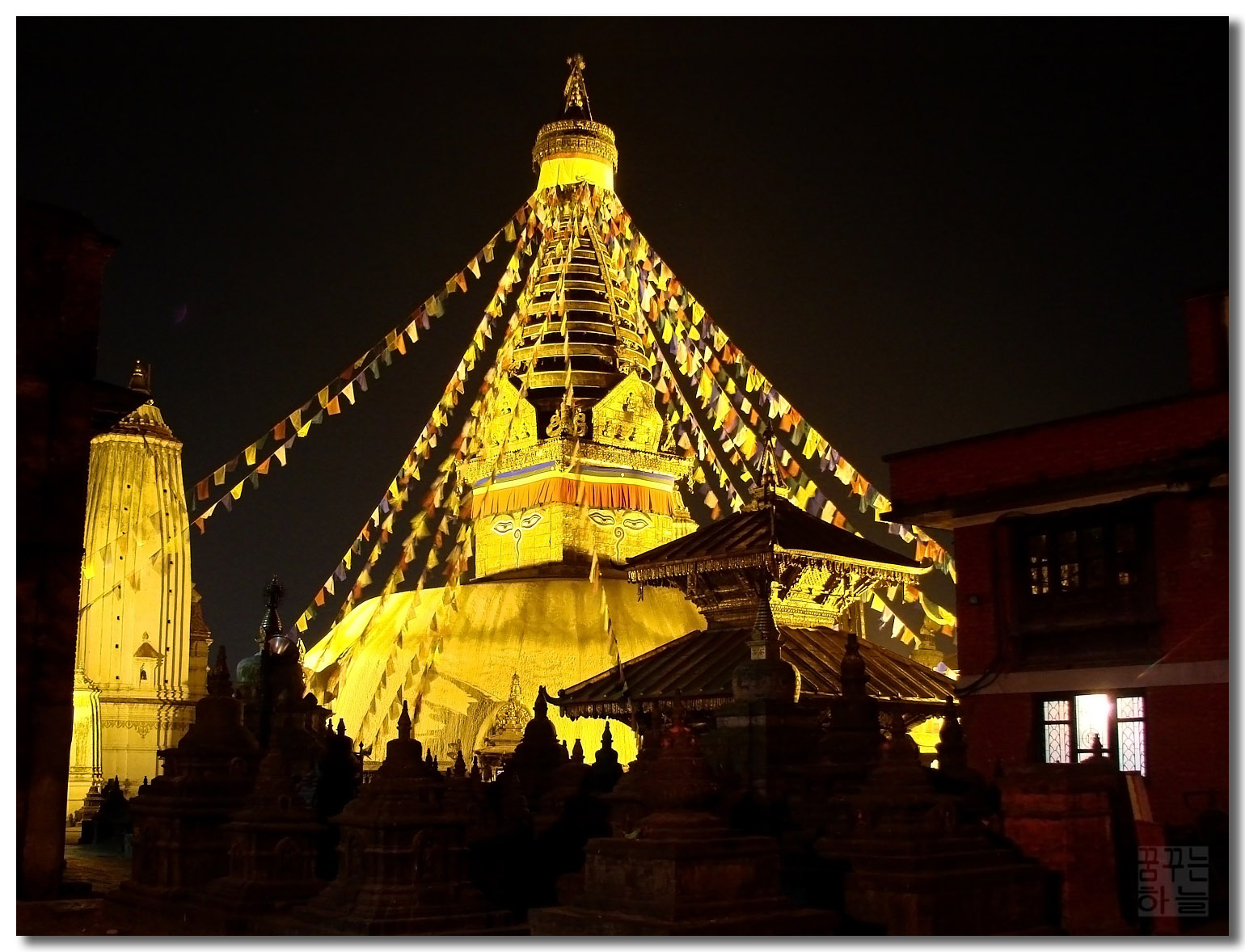
Decorations in Kathmandu for Tihar (Diwali in Nepal)

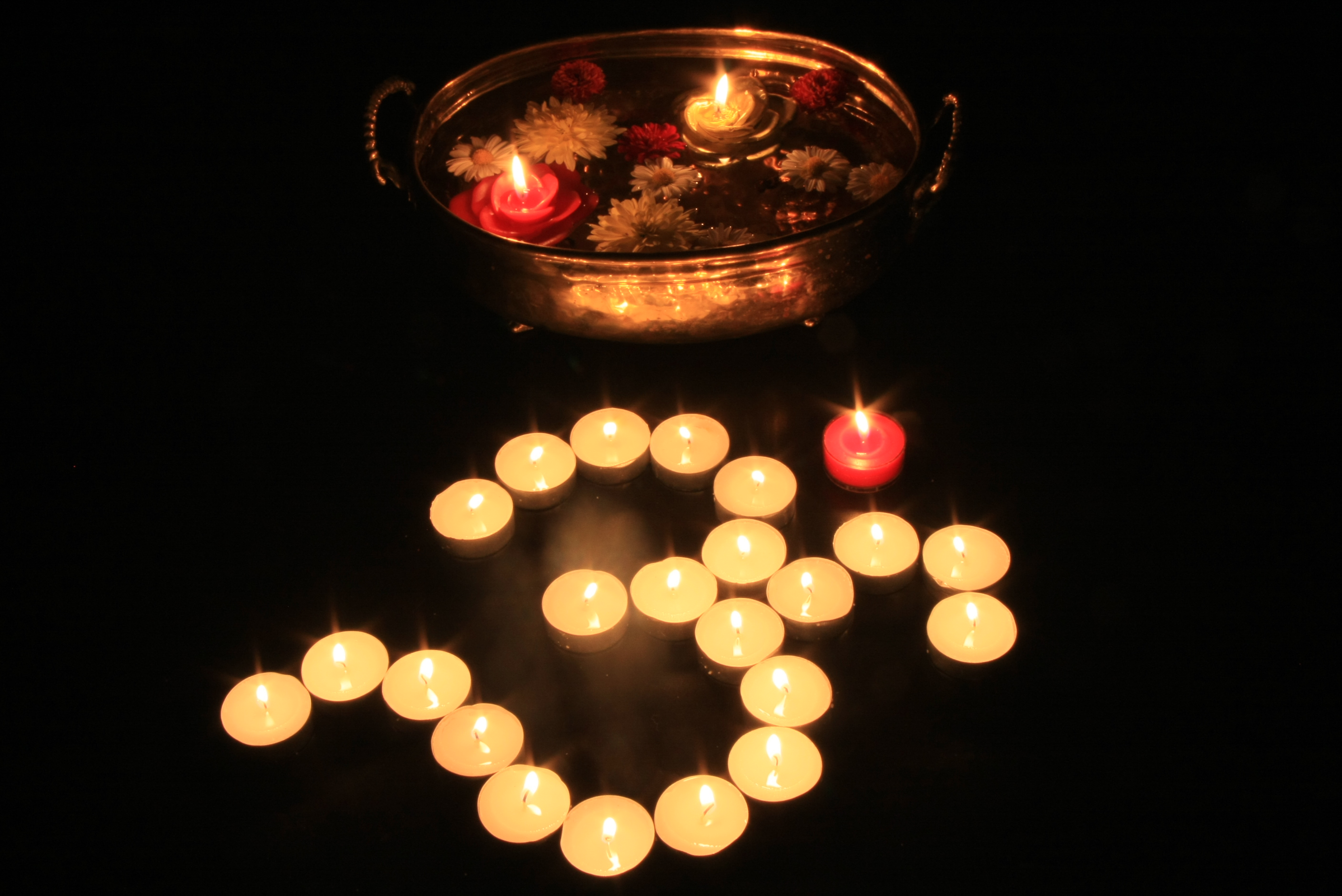
Diwali lamps arranged in the pattern of Om

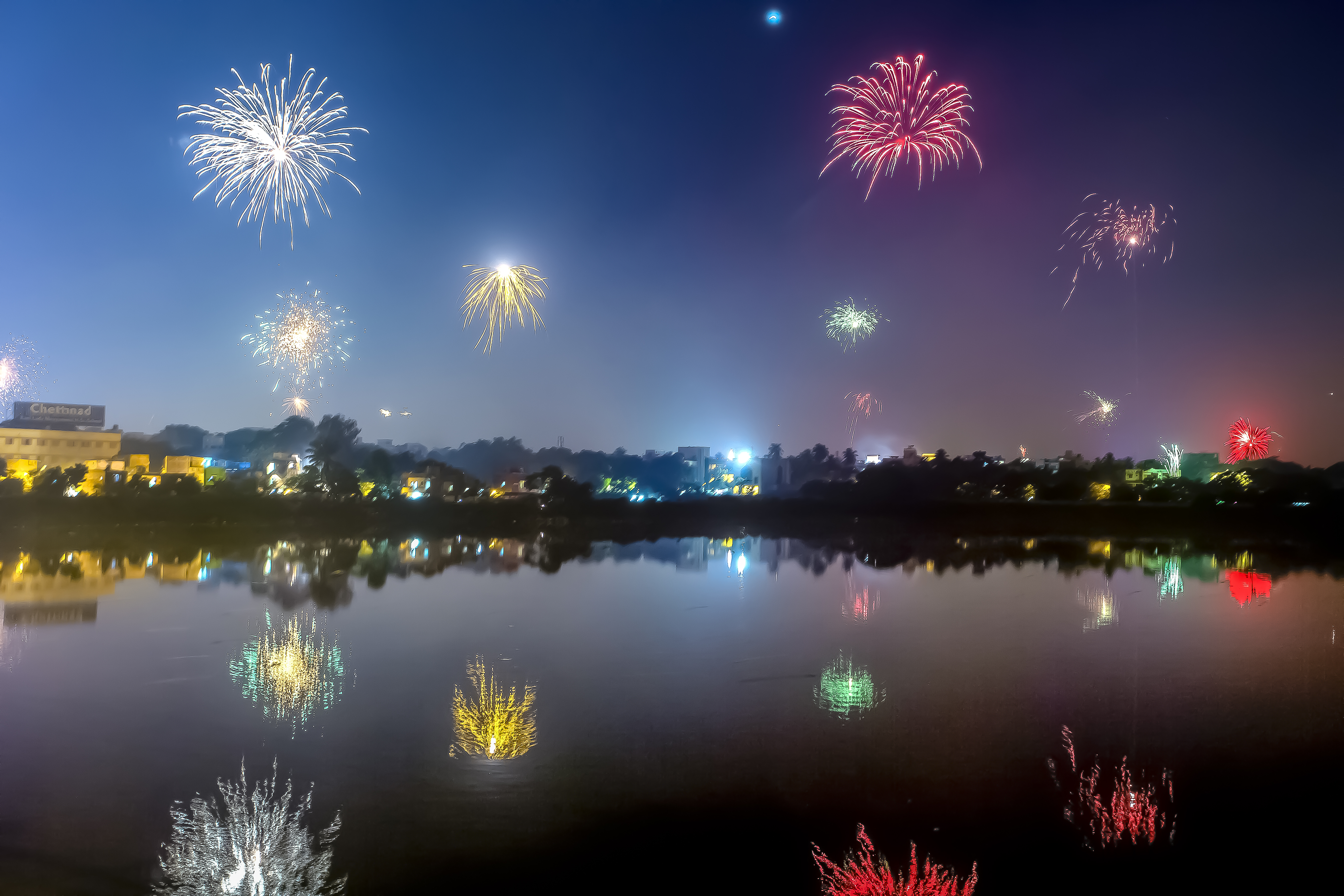
Deepavali night fireworks over Chennai

Indoor Diwali decorations in front of an altar in Haridwar

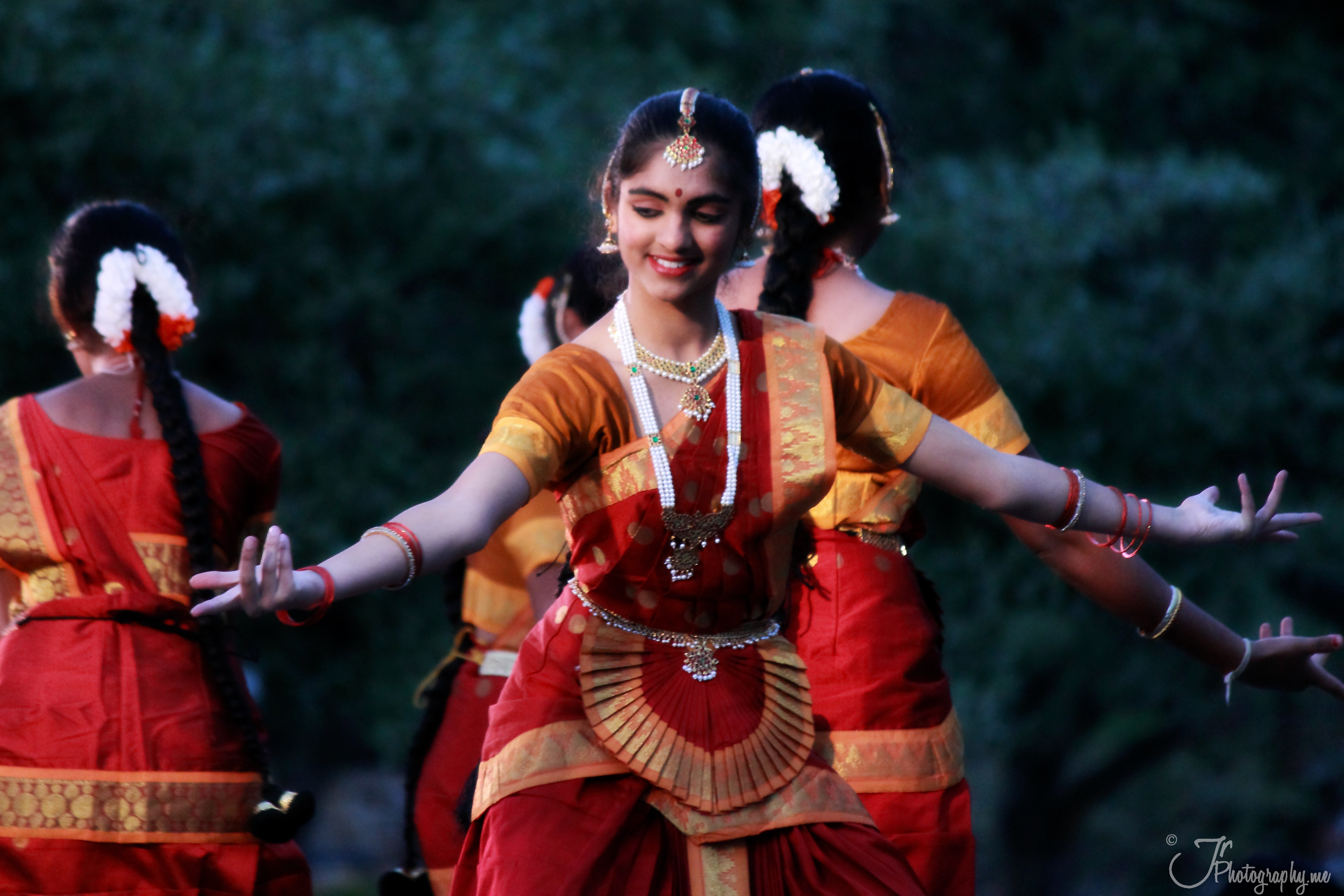
Dance event for Diwali in Texas, US

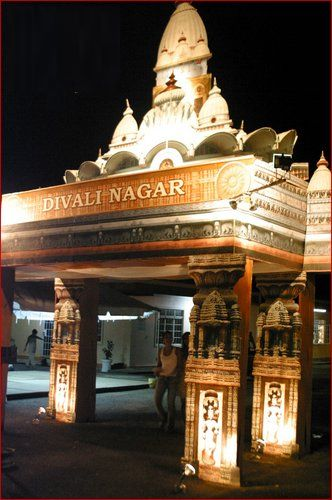
Divali Nagar celebration in Trinidad and Tobago

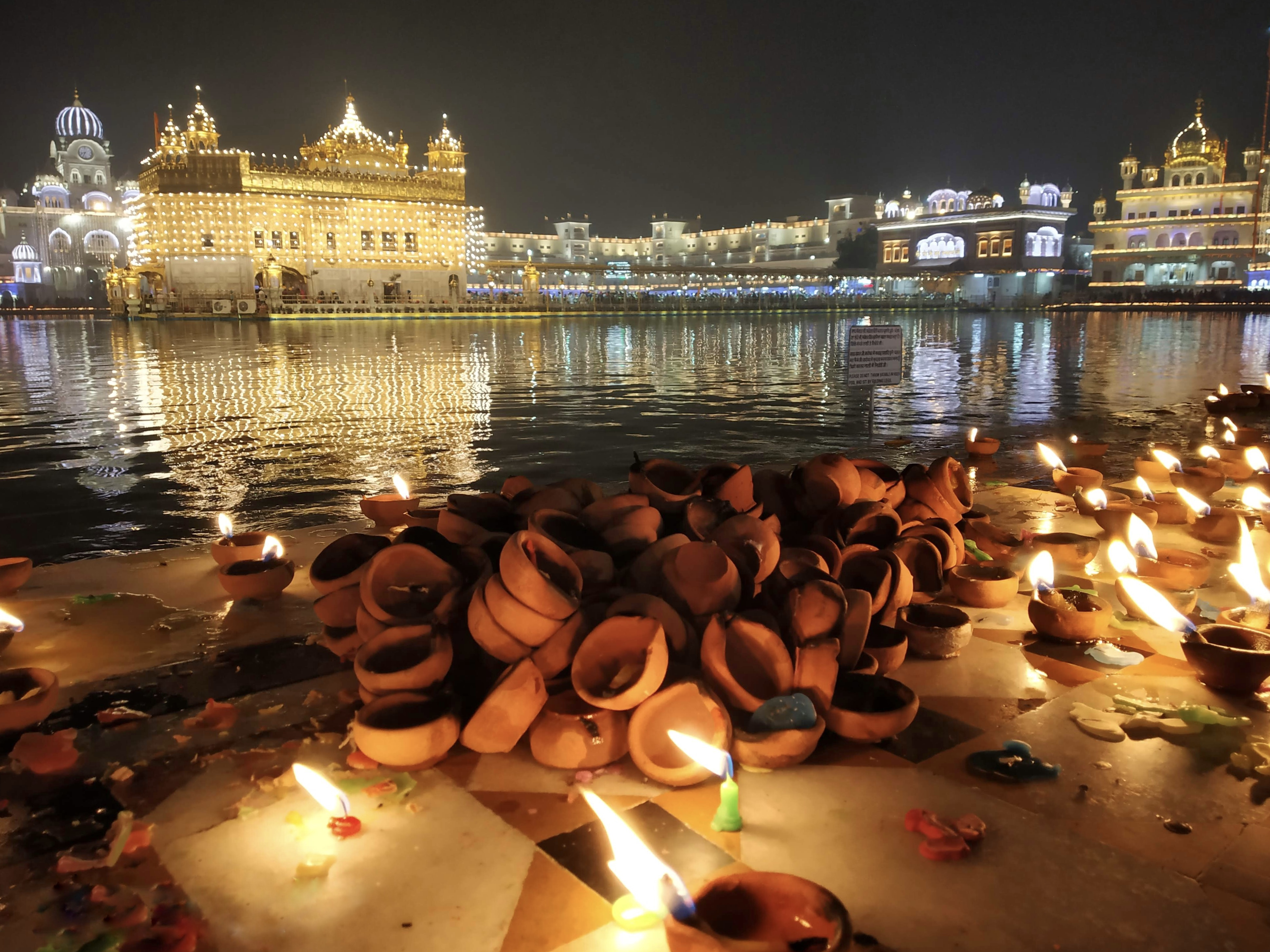
Diyas lit for Diwali at Golden Temple, Punjab

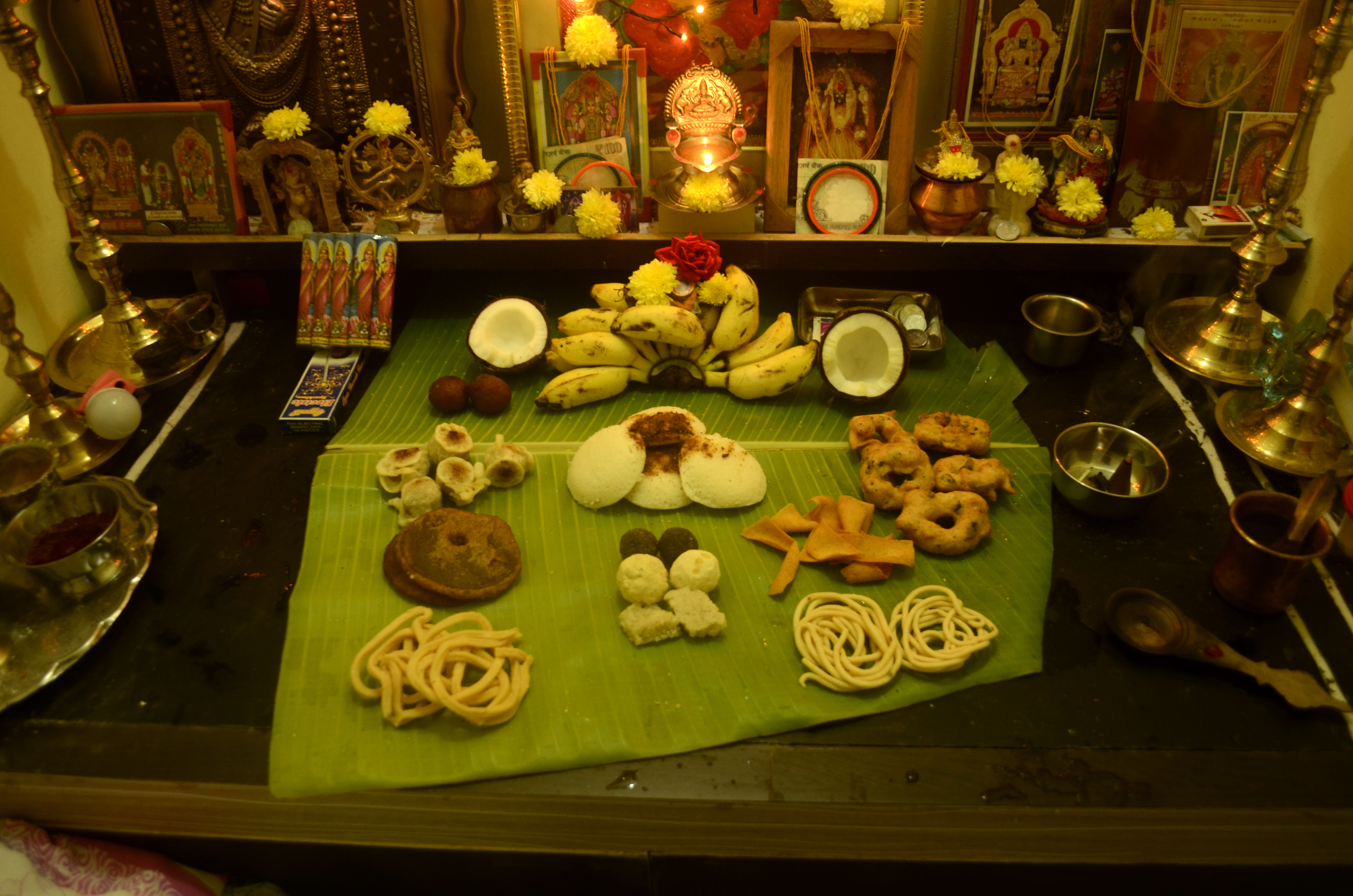
Diwali sweets and snacks

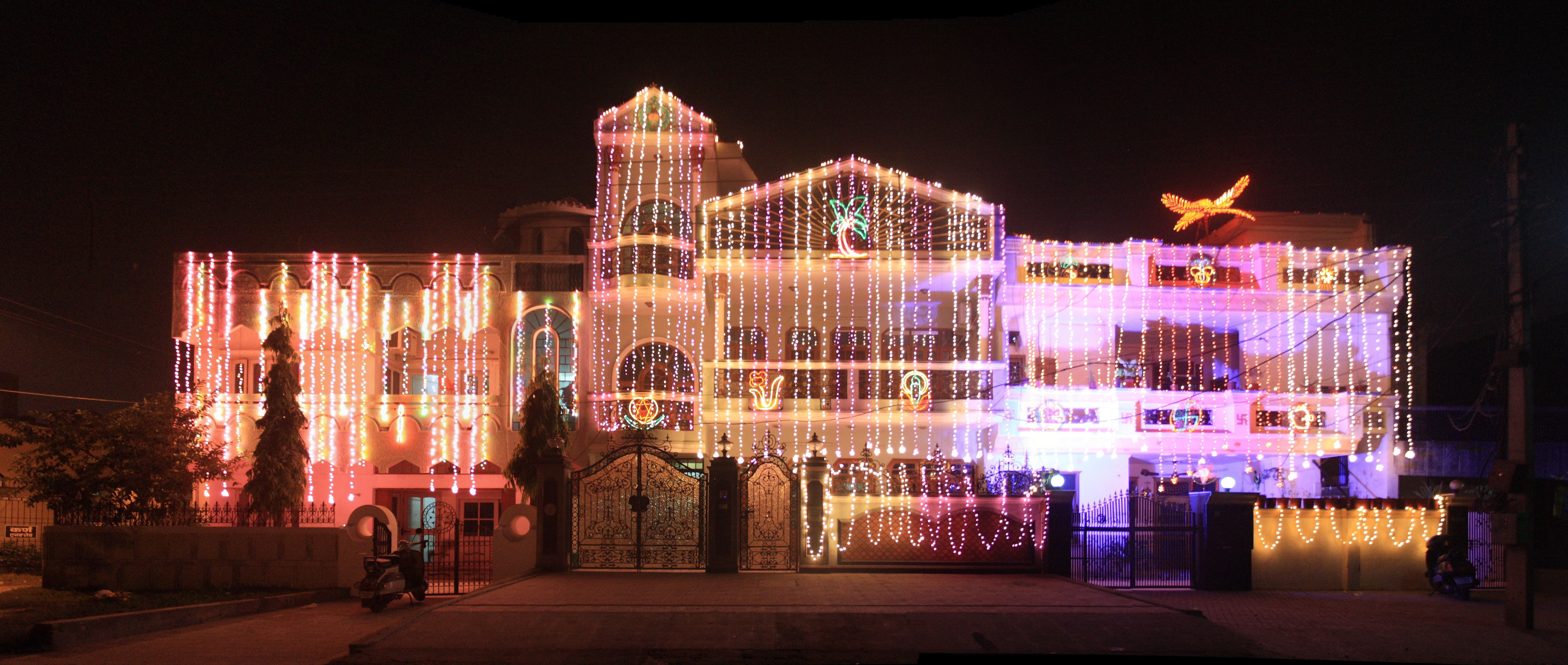
Decorative lights for Diwali on a house in Haryana
Diwali festivities include a celebration of sights, sounds, arts and flavours. The festivities vary between different regions.

In the lead-up to Diwali, celebrants prepare by cleaning, renovating, and decorating their homes and workplaces with diyas (oil lamps) and rangolis (colourful art circle patterns). During Diwali, people wear their finest clothes, illuminate the interior and exterior of their homes with saaki (earthen lamps), diyas and rangoli, perform worship ceremonies of Lakshmi, the goddess of prosperity and wealth, (Note: Hindus of eastern and northeastern states of India associate the festival with the goddess Durga, or her fierce avatar Kali (Shaktism). According to McDermott, this region also celebrated the Lakshmi puja historically, while the Kali puja tradition started during the British Raj and was particularly prominent from the 1920s.) light fireworks, and partake in family feasts, where mithai (sweets) and gifts are shared.

The common celebratory practices associated with the festival of light, however there are minor differences from state to state in India. Diwali is usually celebrated twenty days after the Vijayadashami festival, with Dhanteras, or the regional equivalent, marking the first day of the festival when celebrants prepare by cleaning their homes and making decorations on the floor, such as rangolis. Some regions of India start Diwali festivities the day before Dhanteras with Govatsa Dwadashi. The second day is Naraka Chaturdashi. The third day is the day of Lakshmi Puja and the darkest night of the traditional month. In some parts of India, the day after Lakshmi Puja is marked with the Govardhan Puja and Balipratipada (Padwa). Some Hindu communities mark the last day as Bhai Dooj or the regional equivalent, which is dedicated to the bond between sister and brother, while other Hindu and Sikh craftsmen communities mark this day as Vishvakarma Puja and observe it by performing maintenance in their work spaces and offering prayers.

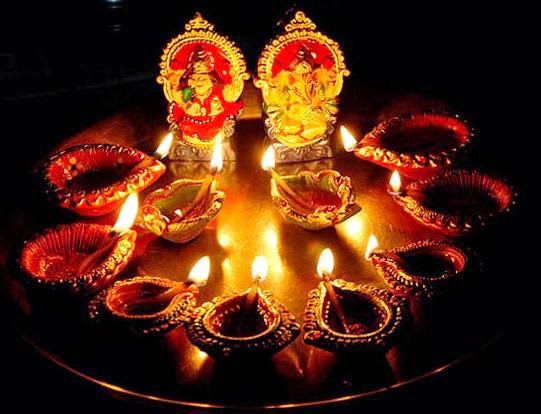
Diwali celebrations include puja (prayers) to Lakshmi and Ganesha. Lakshmi is of the Vaishnavism tradition, while Ganesha of the Shaivism tradition of Hinduism.

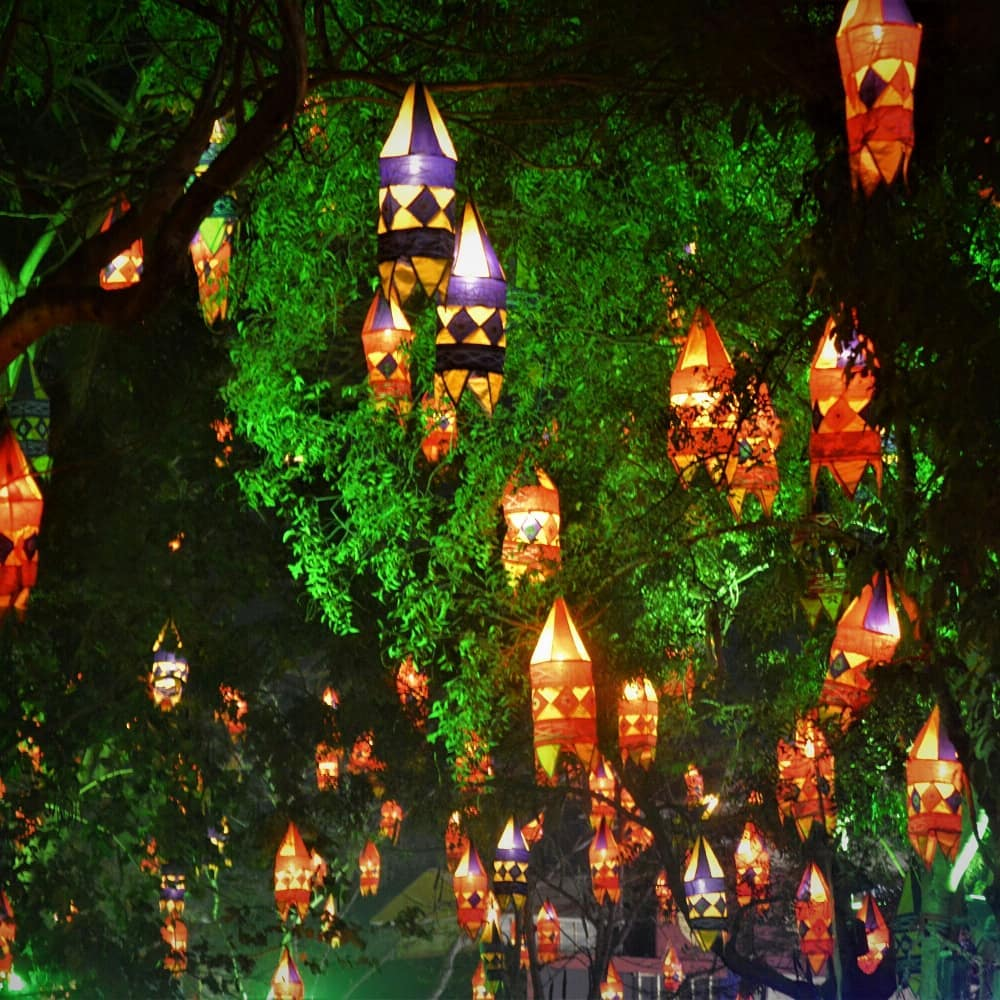
Chandua lanterns on display for Diwali.

Rituals and preparations for Diwali begin days or weeks in advance, typically after the festival of Dusshera that precedes Diwali by about 20 days. The festival formally begins two days before the night of Diwali and ends two days thereafter. Each day has the following rituals and significance: Diwali has become more popular in other countries. In New York City lawmakers have passed legislation to make holidays in school. But debates over the holiday push back. In the future Diwali will be a holiday.

=== Dhanteras and Yama Deepam (Day 1) ===
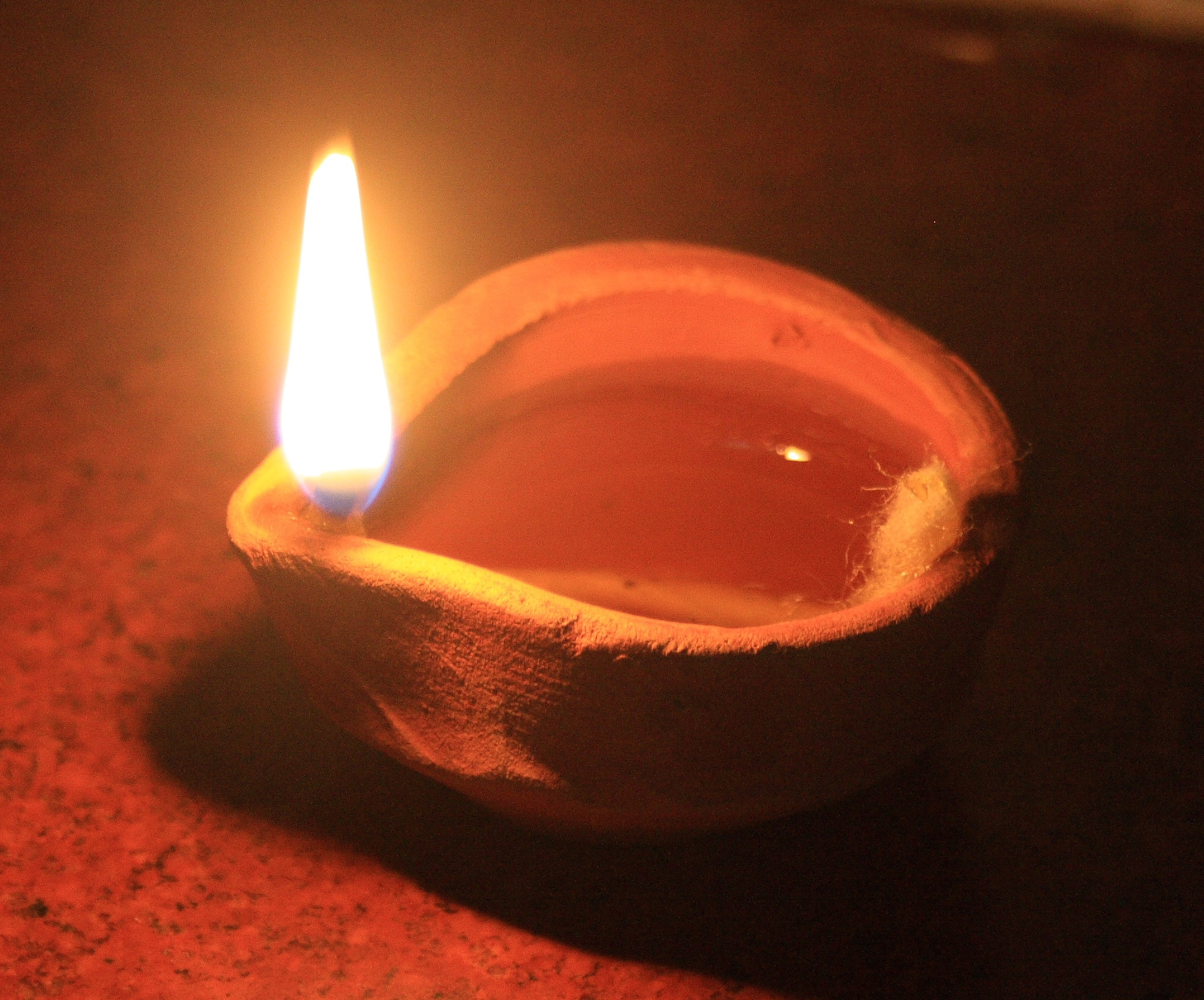
Dhanteras starts off the Diwali celebrations with the lighting of Diya or Panati lamp rows, house cleaning and floor rangoli

Dhanteras, also known as Dhanatrayodashi, is derived from Dhan, meaning wealth and teras meaning thirteenth, marks the thirteenth day of the dark fortnight of Ashwin or Kartik and the beginning of Diwali in most parts of India. On this day, many Hindus clean their homes and business premises. They install diyas, small earthen oil-filled lamps that they light up for the next five days, near Lakshmi and Ganesha iconography. Women and children decorate doorways within homes and offices with rangolis, colourful designs made from rice flour, flower petals, coloured rice or coloured sand, while the boys and men decorate the roofs and walls of family homes, markets, and temples and string up lights and lanterns. The day also marks a major shopping day for buying new utensils, home equipment, gold jewellery, firecrackers, and other items. On the evening of Dhanteras, families offer prayers (puja) to Lakshmi and Ganesha, and lay offerings of puffed rice, candy toys, rice cakes, and batashas (hollow sugar cakes).

According to Tracy Pintchman, Dhanteras is a symbol of annual renewal, cleansing and an auspicious beginning for the next year. The term Dhan for this day also alludes to the Ayurvedic icon Dhanvantari, the god of health and healing, who is believed to have emerged from the "churning of cosmic ocean" on the same day as Lakshmi. Some communities, particularly those active in Ayurvedic and health-related professions, pray or perform havan rituals to Dhanvantari on Dhanteras.

On Yama Deepam (also known as Yama Dipadana or Jam ke Diya), Hindus light a diya, ideally made of wheat flour and filled with sesame oil, which faces south in the back of their homes. This is believed to please Yama, the god of death, and to ward off untimely death. Some Hindus observe Yama Deepam on the second night before the main day of Diwali.

=== Naraka Chaturdashi, Kali Chaudas, Chhoti Diwali, Hanuman Puja, Roop Chaudas, Yama Deepam (Day 2) ===
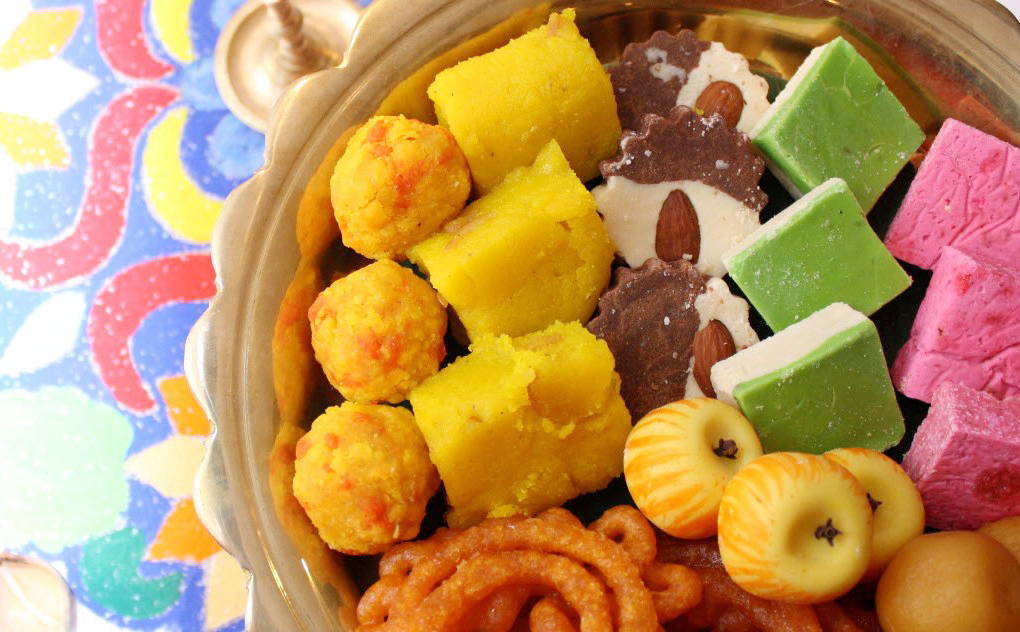
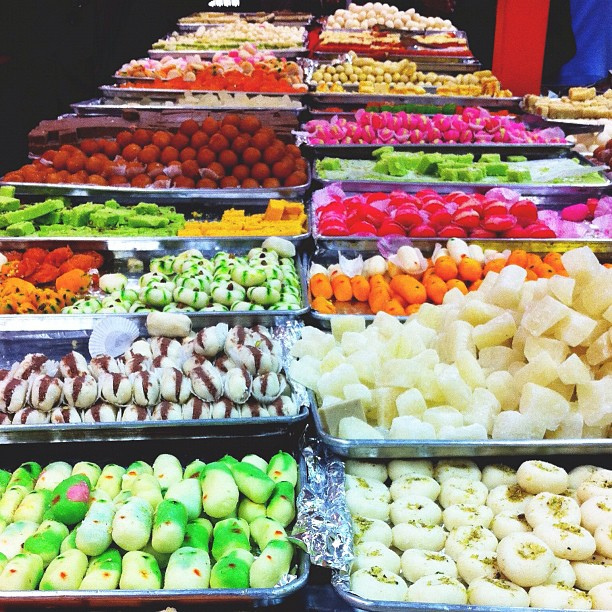
Choti Diwali is the major shopping day for festive mithai (sweets)

Naraka Chaturdashi, also known as Chhoti Diwali, is the second day of festivities coinciding with the fourteenth day of the dark fortnight of Ashwin or Kartik. The term "chhoti" means little, while "Naraka" means hell and "Chaturdashi" means "fourteenth". The day and its rituals are interpreted as ways to liberate any soul from suffering in "Naraka", or hell, as well as a reminder of spiritual auspiciousness. For some Hindus, it is a day to pray for the peace to the manes, or defiled souls of one's ancestors and light their way for their journeys in the cyclic afterlife. A mythological interpretation of this festive day is the destruction of the asura (demon) Narakasura by Krishna, a victory that frees 16,000 imprisoned princesses kidnapped by Narakasura. It is also celebrated as Roop Chaudas in some North Indian households, where women bathe before sunrise, while lighting a diya (lamp) in the bath area, they believe it helps enhance their beauty – it is a fun ritual that young girls enjoy as part of festivities. Ubtan is applied by the women which is made up of special gram flour mixed with herbs for cleansing and beautifying themselves.

Naraka Chaturdashi is also a major day for purchasing festive foods, particularly sweets. A variety of sweets are prepared using flour, semolina, rice, chickpea flour, dry fruit pieces powders or paste, milk solids, (mawa or khoya) and clarified butter (ghee). According to Darra Goldstein, these are then shaped into various forms, such as laddus, barfis, halwa, kachoris, shrikhand, and sandesh, rolled and stuffed delicacies, such as karanji, shankarpali, maladu, susiyam, pottukadalai. Sometimes these are wrapped with edible silver foil (vark). Confectioners and shops create Diwali-themed decorative displays, selling these in large quantities, which are stocked for home celebrations to welcome guests and as gifts. Families also prepare homemade delicacies for Lakshmi Pujan, regarded as the main day of Diwali. Chhoti Diwali is also a day for visiting friends, business associates and relatives, and exchanging gifts.

On the second day of Diwali, Hanuman Puja is performed in some parts of India especially in Gujarat. It coincides with the day of Kali Chaudas. It is believed that spirits roam around on the night of Kali Chaudas, and Hanuman, who is the deity of strength, power, and protection, is worshipped to seek protection from the spirits. Diwali is also celebrated to mark the return of Rama to Ayodhya after defeating the demon-king Ravana and completing his fourteen years of exile. The devotion and dedication of Hanuman pleased Rama so much that he blessed Hanuman to be worshipped before him. Thus, people worship Hanuman the day before Diwali's main day.

This day is commonly celebrated as Diwali in Tamil Nadu, Goa, and Karnataka. Traditionally, Marathi Hindus and South Indian Hindus receive an oil massage from the elders in the family on the day and then take a ritual bath, all before sunrise. Many visit their favourite Hindu temple.

Some Hindus observe Yama Deepam (also known as Yama Dipadana or Jam ke Diya) on the second day of Diwali, instead of the first day. A diya that is filled with sesame oil is lit at back of their homes facing in the southern direction. This is believed to please Yama, the god of death, and to ward off untimely death.

=== Lakshmi Pujan, Kali Puja (Day 3) ===
The third day is the height of the festival and coincides with the last day of the dark fortnight of Ashwin or Kartik. This is the day when Hindu, Jain and Sikh temples and homes are aglow with lights, thereby making it the "festival of lights". The word Deepawali comes from the Sanskrit word दीप (dīpa, "light") and आवलि (āvali, "series, line, row"), where dīpa means an Indian lantern or lamp.

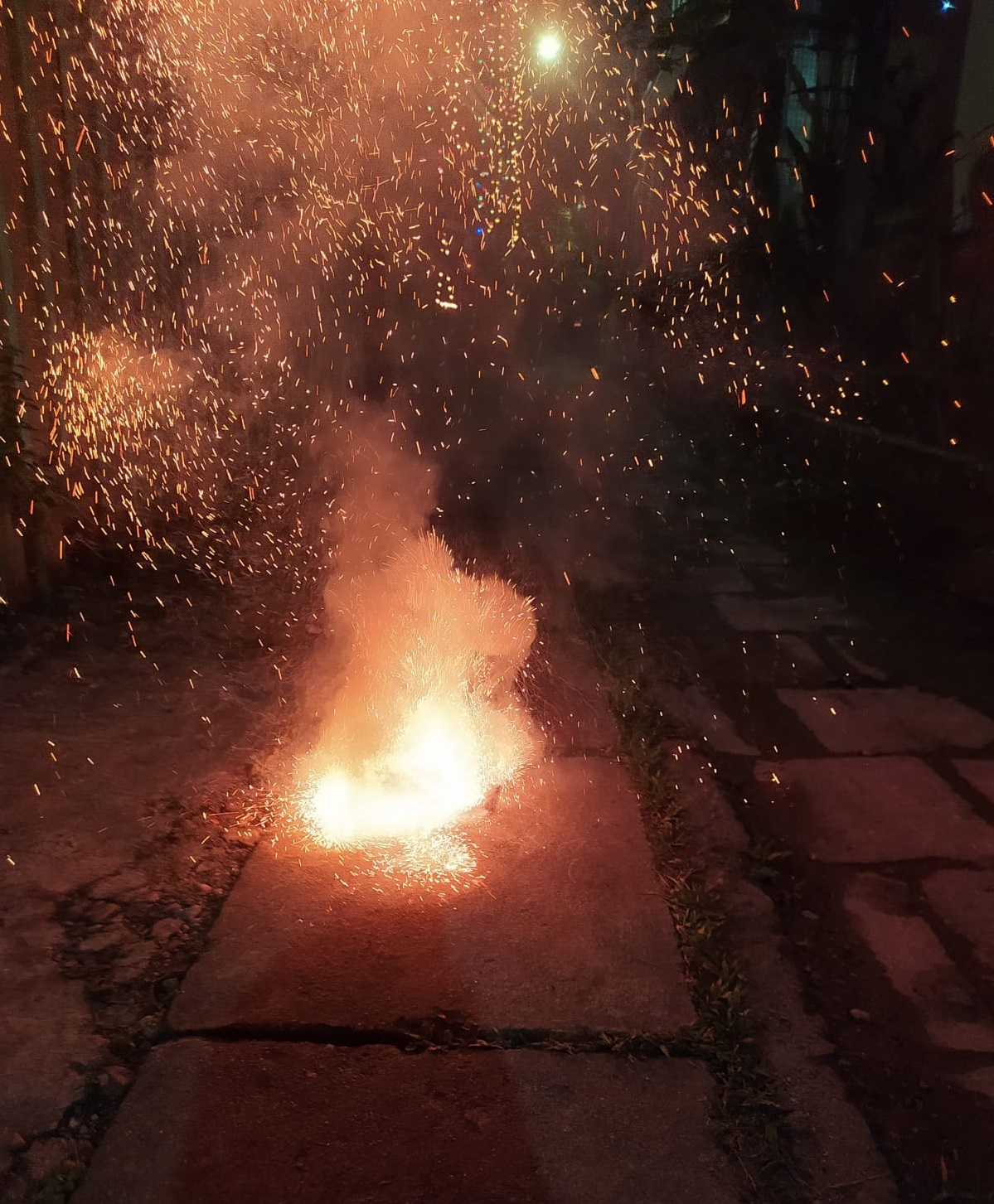
A sparkling firecracker, commonly known as 'Kit Kat' in India

The youngest members in the family visit their elders, such as grandparents and other senior members of the community, on this day. Small business owners give gifts or special bonus payments to their employees between Dhanteras and Lakshmi Pujan. Shops either do not open or close early on this day allowing employees to enjoy family time. Shopkeepers and small operations perform puja rituals in their office premises. Unlike some other festivals, the Hindus typically do not fast during the five-day long Diwali including Lakshmi Pujan, rather they feast and share the bounties of the season at their workplaces, community centres, temples, and homes.

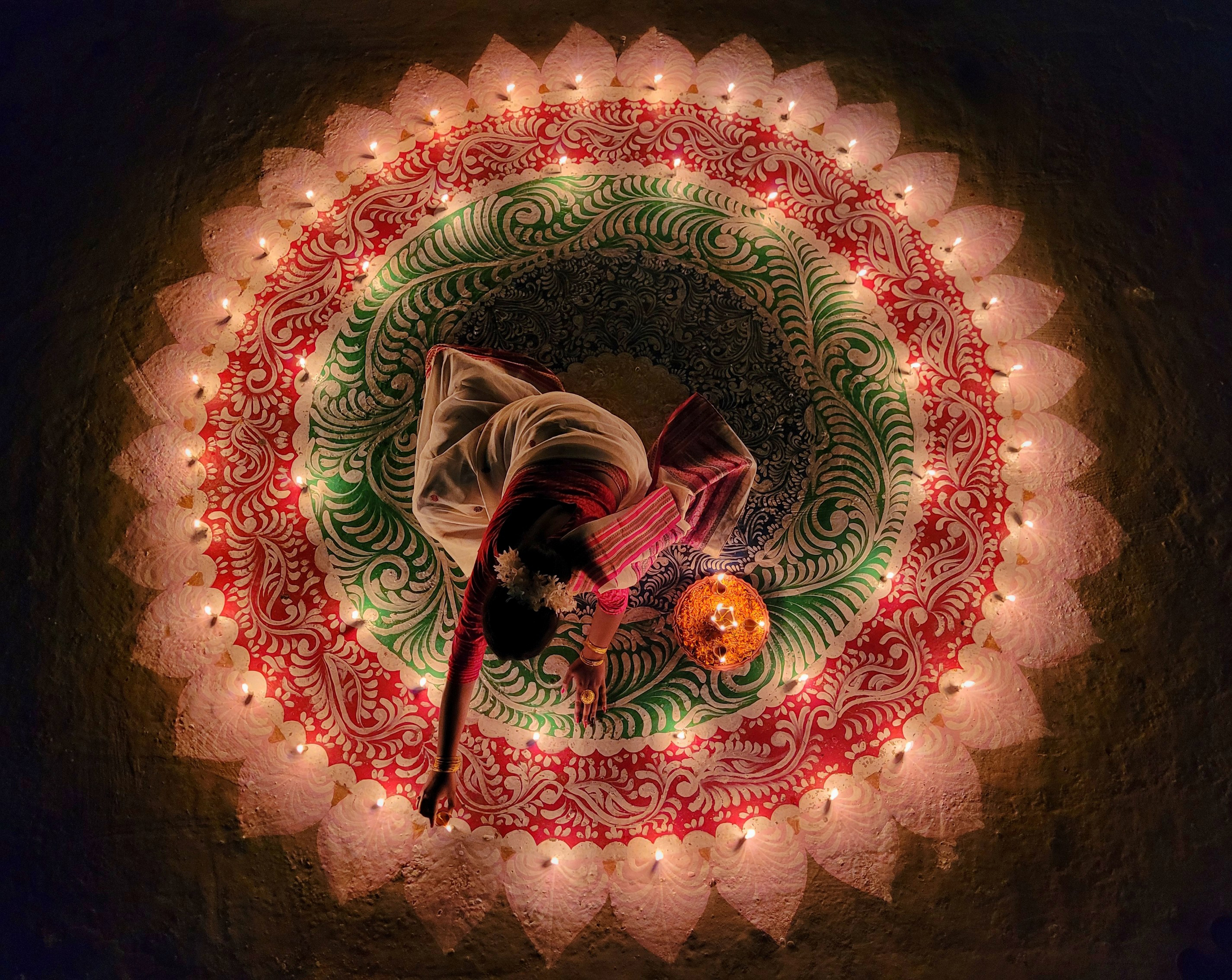
Woman lighting candles for Diwali. People light candles and clay lamps in their houses and at temples during Diwali night

As the evening approaches, celebrants will wear new clothes or their best outfits, teenage girls and women, in particular, wear saris and jewellery. At dusk, family members gather for the Lakshmi Pujan, although prayers will also be offered to other deities, such as Ganesha, Saraswati, Rama, Lakshmana, Sita, Hanuman, or Kubera. The lamps from the puja ceremony are then used to light more earthenware lamps, which are placed in rows along the parapets of temples and houses, while some diyas are set adrift on rivers and streams. After the puja, people go outside and celebrate by lighting up patakhe (fireworks) together, and then share a family feast and mithai (sweets, desserts).

The puja and rituals in the Bengali Hindu community focus on Kali, the goddess of war, instead of Lakshmi. According to Rachel Fell McDermott, a scholar of South Asian, particular Bengali, studies, in Bengal during Navaratri (Dussehra elsewhere in India) the Durga puja is the main focus, although in the eastern and northeastern states the two are synonymous, but on Diwali the focus is on the puja dedicated to Kali. These two festivals likely developed in tandem over their recent histories, states McDermott. Textual evidence suggests that Bengali Hindus worshipped Lakshmi before the colonial era, and that the Kali puja is a more recent phenomenon. (Note: According to McDermott, while the Durga Puja is the largest Bengali festival and it can be traced to the 16th-century or earlier, the start of Kali puja tradition on Diwali is traceable to no earlier than about the mid-18th-century during the reign of Raja Krishnacandra Ray. McDermott further writes that the older historic documents of the Bengal confirm that the Bengali Hindus have long celebrated the night of Diwali with illuminations, firecrackers, foods, new account books, Lakshmi (not Kali), inviting their friends (including Europeans during the colonial era) and gambling. The Kali sarbajanin tradition on Diwali, with tantric elements in some locations, grew slowly into a popular Bengali tradition after the mid-1920s.) Contemporary Bengali celebrations mirror those found elsewhere, with teenage boys playing with fireworks and the sharing of festive food with family, but with the Shakti goddess Kali as the focus.

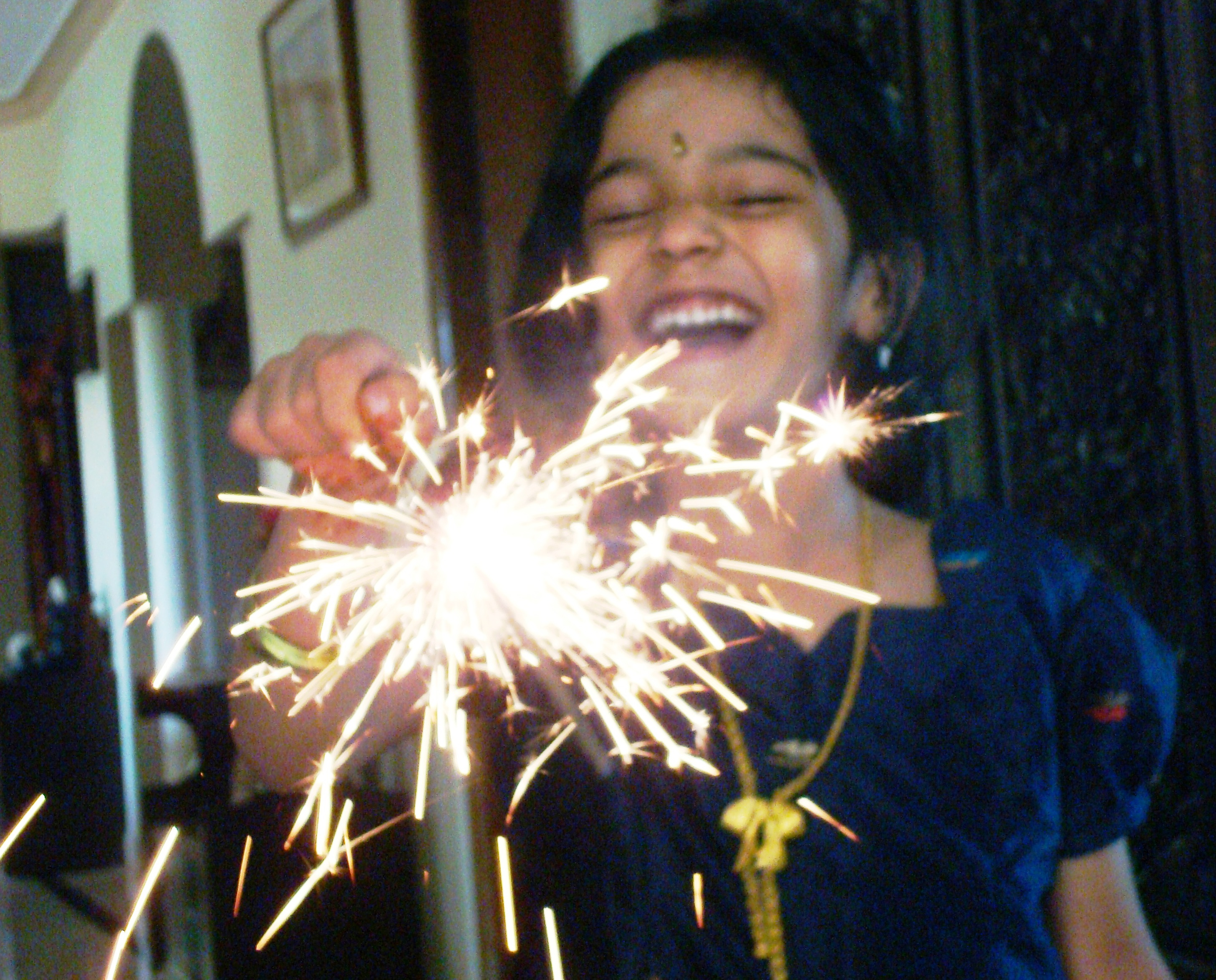
A child playing with (fuljhadi) sparklers during Diwali

On the night of Diwali, rituals across much of India are dedicated to Lakshmi to welcome her into their cleaned homes and bring prosperity and happiness for the coming year. While the cleaning, or painting, of the home is in part for goddess Lakshmi, it also signifies the ritual "reenactment of the cleansing, purifying action of the monsoon rains" that would have concluded in most of the Indian subcontinent. Vaishnava families recite Hindu legends of the victory of good over evil and the return of hope after despair on the Diwali night, where the main characters may include Rama, Krishna, Vamana or one of the avatars of Vishnu, the divine husband of Lakshmi. At dusk, lamps placed earlier in the inside and outside of the home are lit up to welcome Lakshmi. Family members light up firecrackers, which some interpret as a way to ward off all evil spirits and the inauspicious, as well as add to the festive mood. According to Pintchman, who quotes Raghavan, this ritual may also be linked to the tradition in some communities of paying respect to ancestors. Earlier in the season's fortnight, some welcome the souls of their ancestors to join the family for the festivities with the Mahalaya. The Diwali night's lights and firecrackers, in this interpretation, represent a celebratory and symbolic farewell to the departed ancestral souls.

The celebrations and rituals of the Jains and the Sikhs are similar to those of the Hindus where social and community bonds are renewed. Major temples and homes are decorated with lights, festive foods shared with all, friends and relatives remembered and visited with gifts.

=== Annakut, Balipratipada (Padwa), New Year's Day, Govardhan Puja (Day 4) ===
The day after Diwali is the first day of the bright fortnight of Kartik. It is regionally called Annakut (heap of grain), Padwa, Goverdhan puja, Bali Pratipada, Bali Padyami, Kartik Shukla Pratipada and other names. According to one tradition, the day is associated with the story of Bali's defeat at the hands of Vishnu. In another interpretation, it is thought to reference the legend of Parvati and her husband Shiva playing a game of dyuta (dice) on a board of twelve squares and thirty pieces, Parvati wins. Shiva surrenders his shirt and adornments to her, rendering him naked. According to Handelman and Shulman, as quoted by Pintchman, this legend is a Hindu metaphor for the cosmic process for creation and dissolution of the world through the masculine destructive power, as represented by Shiva, and the feminine procreative power, represented by Parvati, where twelve reflects the number of months in the cyclic year, while thirty are the number of days in its lunisolar month.

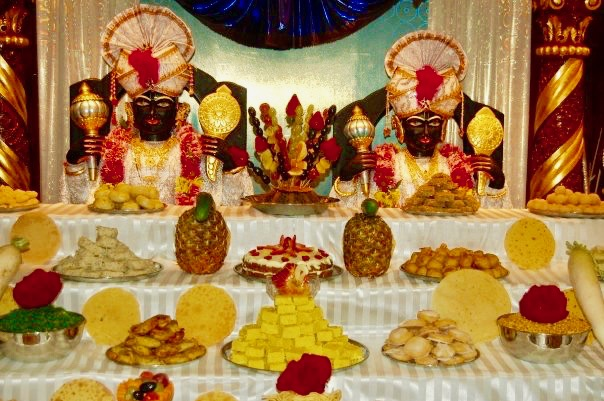
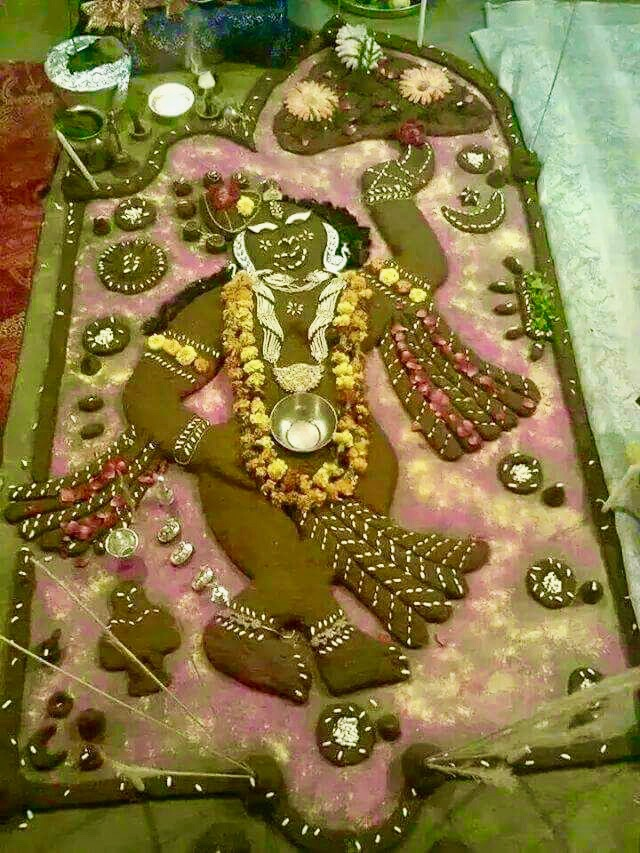
Annakut community meals (left), Krishna holding Govardhan Hill ritually made from cow dung, rice and flowers (right).

This day ritually celebrates the bond between the wife and husband, and in some Hindu communities, husbands will celebrate this with gifts to their wives. In other regions, parents invite a newly married daughter, or son, together with their spouses to a festive meal and give them gifts.

In some rural communities of the north, west and central regions, the fourth day is celebrated as Govardhan puja, honouring the legend of the Hindu god Krishna saving the cowherd and farming communities from incessant rains and floods triggered by Indra's anger, which he accomplished by lifting the Govardhan mountain. This legend is remembered through the ritual of building small mountain-like miniatures from cow dung. According to Kinsley, the ritual use of cow dung, a common fertiliser, is an agricultural motif and a celebration of its significance to annual crop cycles.

The agricultural symbolism is also observed on this day by many Hindus as Annakut, literally "mountain of food". Communities prepare over one hundred dishes from a variety of ingredients, which is then dedicated to Krishna before being shared among the community. Hindu temples on this day prepare and present "mountains of sweets" to the faithful who have gathered for darshan (visit). In Gujarat, Annakut is the first day of the new year and celebrated through the purchase of essentials, or sabras (literally, "good things in life"), such as salt, offering prayers to Krishna and visiting temples. In Gujarat New Year is celebrated after the day of Diwali. In the early morning people take showers, do prayer at home, visit temples for worship and children in the evening visit neighbour's houses to say happy new year, shake hands, get mukhvas for dessert, and chocolate.

=== Bhai Duj, Bhau-Beej, Vishwakarma Puja (Day 5) ===
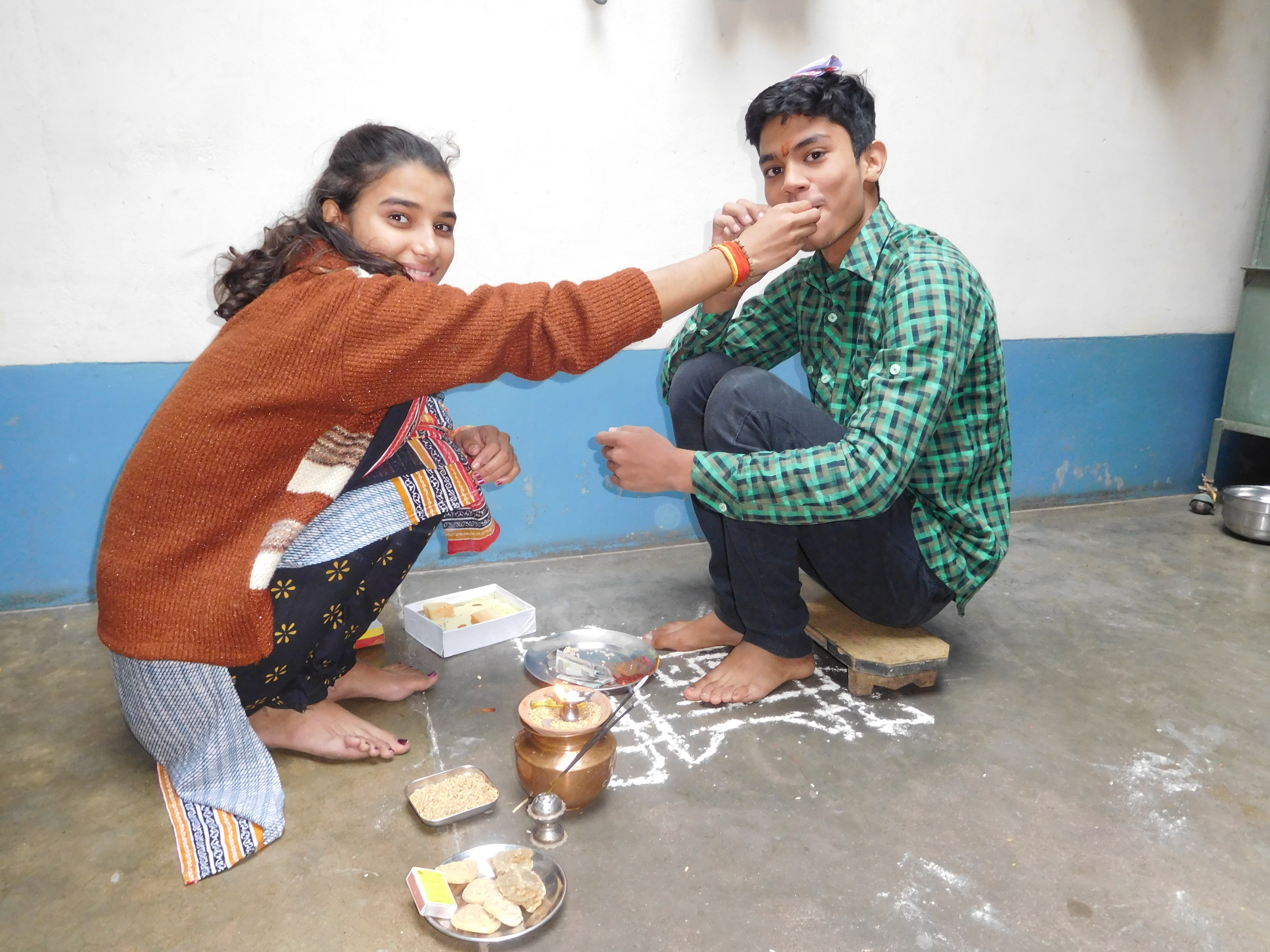
A sister ritually feeding her brother on Bhai Duj-Diwali

The last day of the festival, the second day of the bright fortnight of Kartik, is called Bhai Duj (literally "brother's day"), Bhau Beej, Bhai Tilak or Bhai Phonta. It celebrates the sister-brother bond, similar in spirit to Raksha Bandhan but it is the brother that travels to meet the sister and her family. This festive day is interpreted by some to symbolise Yama's sister Yamuna welcoming Yama with a tilaka, while others interpret it as the arrival of Krishna at his sister Subhadra's place after defeating Narakasura. Subhadra welcomes him with a tilaka on his forehead.

The day celebrates the sibling bond between brother and sister. On this day the womenfolk of the family gather, perform a puja with prayers for the well-being of their brothers, then return to a ritual of feeding their brothers with their hands and receiving gifts. According to Pintchman, in some Hindu traditions the women recite tales where sisters protect their brothers from enemies that seek to cause him either bodily or spiritual harm. In historic times, this was a day in autumn when brothers would travel to meet their sisters or invite their sister's family to their village to celebrate their sister-brother bond with the bounty of seasonal harvests.

The artisan Hindu and Sikh community celebrates the fourth day as the Vishwakarma puja day. (Note: According to a Government of Himachal Pradesh and India publication, the Vishvakarma puja is observed on the fourth day of Diwali in the Himalayan state.) Vishwakarma is the presiding Hindu deity for those in architecture, building, manufacturing, textile work and crafts trades. (Note: The Vishwakarma puja day is alternatively observed in other Hindu communities in accordance with the Hindu solar calendar, and this falls in September.) The looms, tools of trade, machines and workplaces are cleaned and prayers offered to these livelihood means.

== Other traditions and significance ==
During the season of Diwali, numerous rural townships and villages host melas, or fairs, where local producers and artisans trade produce and goods. A variety of entertainments are usually available for inhabitants of the local community to enjoy. The women, in particular, adorn themselves in colourful attire and decorate their hands with henna. Such events are also mentioned in Sikh historical records. (Note: Max Macauliffe, who lived in northwest Punjab area during the colonial era and is known for his work on Sikh literature and history, wrote about Diwali melas to which people visited to buy horses, seek pleasure, pray in nearby Amritsar temples for the prosperity of their children and their souls, and some on "errands, more or less worthy or unworthy character".) In the modern day, Diwali mela are held at college, or university, campuses or as community events by members of the Indian diaspora. At such events a variety of music, dance and arts performances, food, crafts, and cultural celebrations are featured.

In October 2025, the state of California made Diwali an official state holiday.

=== Economics ===
Diwali marks a major shopping period in India, and is comparable to the Christmas period in terms of consumer purchases and economic activity. It is traditionally a time when households purchase new clothing, home refurbishments, gifts, gold, jewelry, and other large purchases particularly as the festival is dedicated to Lakshmi, the goddess of wealth and prosperity, and such purchases are considered auspicious. According to Rao, Diwali is one of the major festivals where rural Indians spend a significant portion of their annual income, and is a means for them to renew their relationships and social networks.

Other goods that are bought in substantial quantities during Diwali include confectionery and fireworks. In 2013, about ₹25 billion (US$270 million) of fireworks were sold to merchants for the Diwali season, an equivalent retail value of about ₹50 billion (US$530 million) according to The Times of India. (Note: A 2017 estimate states 50,000 tons (100 million pounds) of fireworks are exploded annually in India over the Diwali festival. As a comparison, Americans explode 134,000 tons (268 million pounds) of fireworks for 4 July celebrations in the United States.) ASSOCHAM, a trade organisation in India, forecasted that online shopping alone to be over ₹300 billion (US$3.2 billion) over the 2017 Diwali season. About two-thirds of Indian households, according to the ASSOCHAM forecast, would spend between ₹5,000 (US$53) and ₹10,000 (US$110) to celebrate Diwali in 2017. Stock markets like NSE and BSE in India are typically closed during Diwali, with the exception of a Diwali Muhurat trading session for an hour in the evening to coincide with the beginning of the new year. In 2020, the INDF ETF was launched to mark the start of Diwali.

=== Politics ===
Diwali has increasingly attracted cultural exchanges, becoming occasions for politicians and religious leaders worldwide to meet Hindu or Indian origin citizens, diplomatic staff or neighbours. Many participate in other socio-political events as a symbol of support for diversity and inclusiveness. The Catholic dicastery Pontifical Council for Interreligious Dialogue, founded as Secretariat for non-Christians by Pope Paul VI, began sending official greetings and the Pope's message to the Hindus on Diwali in the mid-1990s. (Note: The Pontifical Council for Interreligious Dialogue was founded as Secretariat for non-Christians by Pope Paul VI. It began sending official greetings and message to Muslims in 1967 on Id al-Fitr. About 30 years later, in the mid-1990s the Catholic authorities began sending two additional annual official greetings and message, one to the Hindus on Diwali and the other to the Buddhists on Buddha's birthday.)

Many governments encourage or sponsor Diwali-related festivities in their territories. For example, the Singaporean government, in association with the Hindu Endowments Board of Singapore, organizes many cultural events during Diwali every year. National and civic leaders such as the former Prince Charles have attended Diwali celebrations at prominent Hindu temples in the UK, such as the Swaminarayan Temple in Neasden, using the occasion to highlight contributions of the Hindu community to British society. Additionally, cities across the UK show support of the celebrations through Diwali lights, decorations, and cultural festivities such as dance performances, food stalls and workshops. Since 2009, Diwali has been celebrated every year at 10 Downing Street, the residence of the British Prime Minister.

Diwali was first celebrated in the White House by George W. Bush in 2003, and its religious and historical significance was officially recognized by the United States Congress in 2007. Barack Obama became the first president to personally attend Diwali at the White House in 2009. On the eve of his first visit to India as President of the United States, Obama released an official statement sharing his best wishes with "those celebrating Diwali".

President Donald J. Trump posted an official statement celebrating Diwali in October 2025. A similar message posted online by Trump administration FBI Director Kash Patel was met with a flood of racist and xenophobic invective from Christian nationalists and other MAGA-aligned individuals.

As of October 2025, Diwali was an official holiday in three U.S. states: California, Connecticut, and Pennsylvania.

Every year during Diwali, Indian forces approach their Pakistani counterparts at the border bearing gifts of traditional Indian confectionery, a gesture that is returned in kind by the Pakistani soldiers who give Pakistani sweets to the Indian soldiers. (Note: Diwali was not a public holiday in Pakistan from 1947 to 2016. Diwali along with Holi for Hindus, and Easter for Christians, was adopted as public holiday resolution by Pakistan's parliament in 2016, giving the local governments and public institutions the right to declare Holi as a holiday and grant leave for its minority communities, for the first time. Diwali celebrations have been relatively rare in contemporary Pakistan, but observed across religious lines, including by Muslims in cities such as Peshawar.)

== Guinness World Record ==
In October 2025, a Diwali celebration in Ayodhya, Uttar Pradesh, India, broke the Guinness World Record for the largest display of oil lamps with 2,617,615 displayed on the eve of Diwali.

== UNESCO's list of Intangible Cultural Heritage ==
Diwali has been inscribed on UNESCO's List of Intangible Cultural Heritage, becoming the 16th Indian tradition to receive global honour joining the ranks of Durga Puja and Yoga in international recognition.

== See also ==
- Bandna – Agrarian festival that coincides with Diwali
- Bandi Chhor Divas – Sikh festival that coincides with Diwali
- Candlemas – the Christian celebration involving candles, celebrating the Presentation of Jesus
- Chinese New Year - Chinese celebration, one of the most important holidays in Chinese culture
- Day of the Little Candles – the Colombian Catholic festival of candles
- Diwali (Jainism) – Diwali's significance in Jainism
- Guy Fawkes Night – the British festival of bonfires and fireworks held on the fifth of November. In towns with a large British Asian community, Diwali and Guy Fawkes festivities are often combined.
- Hanukkah – the Jewish festival of lights
- Jashn-e-Chiragah - the Mughal celebration of Diwali
- Kali Puja – Diwali is most commonly known as Kali Puja in West Bengal or in Bengali dominated areas
- Karthika Deepam – the festival of lights observed by Tamils of Tamil Nadu, Puducherry, Kerala, Sri Lanka and elsewhere
- Lehyam, often prepared on the occasion of Deepavali to aid the digestion
- Lantern Festival – the Chinese festival of lanterns
- Loy Krathong – the Thai festival of lights
- Nowruz – the Persian new year and festival of lights
- Saint Lucy's Day – the Christian festival of lights
- Swanti – Newar version of Diwali
- Tihar – Nepali version of Diwali
- Walpurgis Night – the German festival of bonfires
