= Diwali (Jainism) =

Indian religious celebration

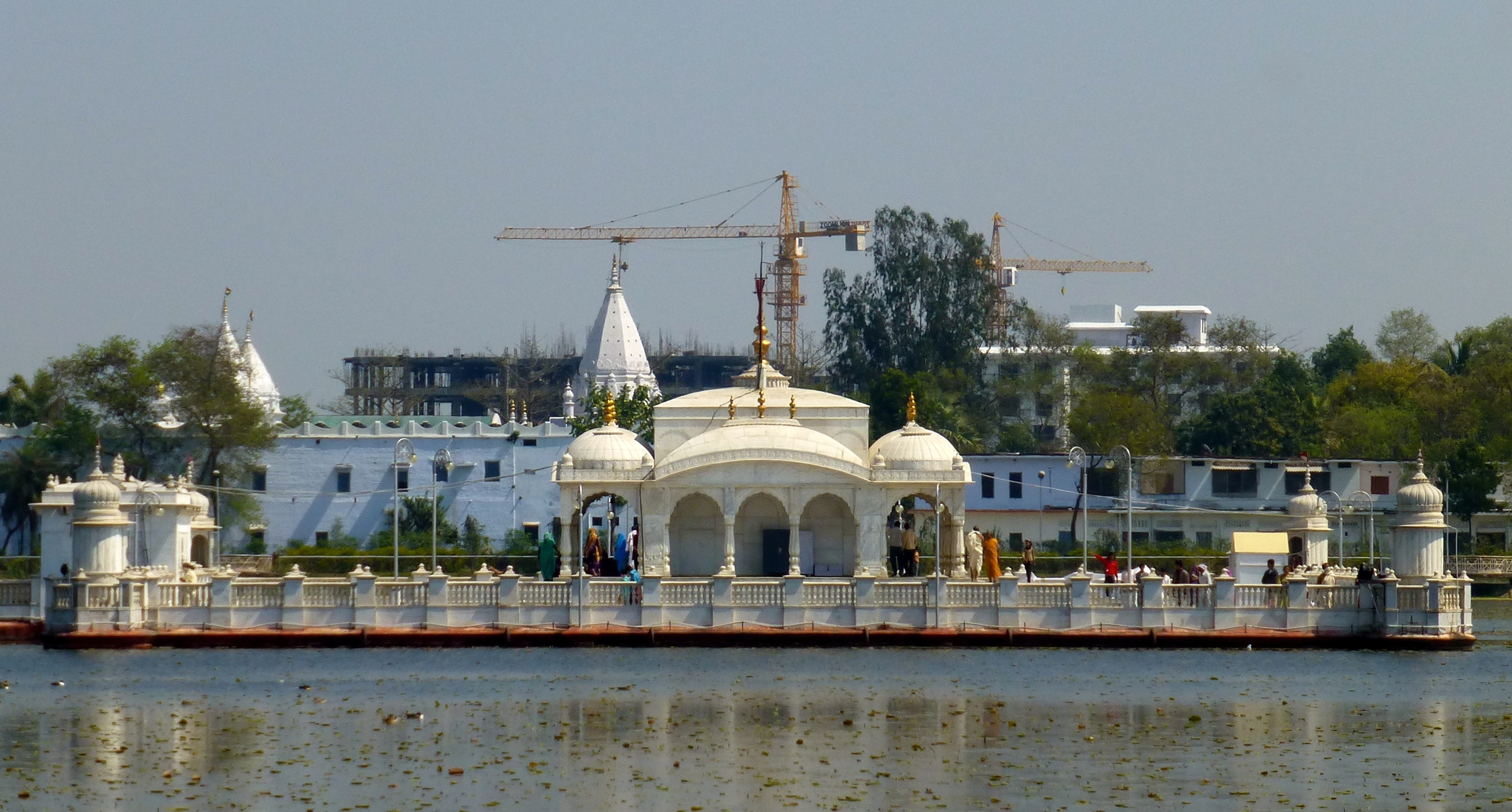
- Pawapuri where Mahavira attained Niravana
- Observed by: Jains
- Type: Religious, India (national holiday)
- Significance: Moksha of Mahaveer Swami
- Celebrations: Going to the Jain Temple
- Observances: Prayers, religious rituals
- Date: Amavasya of Kartika
- Frequency: Annual
- Related to: Diwali, Bandi Chhor Divas, Tihar, Swanti, Sohrai, Bandna

Deepawali in Jainism marks the anniversary of Nirvana (final release) or liberation of Mahavira's soul, the twenty-fourth and last Jain Tirthankara of the present cosmic age. It is celebrated at the same time as the Hindu festival of Diwali. Diwali marks the end of the year for Jains and it likewise commemorates the passing of their twenty-fourth Tirthankara Mahavira and his achievement of moksha.

== History ==
According to Tilyapannatti of Yativrsabha, Mahavira attained Moksha (liberation) on this day at Pawapuri on 15 October 527 BCE, on Chaturdashi of Kartika.

Mahavira, the 24th Tirthankara of this era, revitalised Jain dharma. According to tradition, the chief disciple of Mahavira, Ganadhara Gautam Swami also attained omniscience i.e. absolute or complete knowledge (Kevala Jñāna) on this day, thus making Diwali one of the most important Jain festivals.

Mahavira attained his nirvana at the dawn of the amavasya (new moon). According to the Śvētāmbara text Kalpasutra, many gods were present there, illuminating the darkness. The following night was pitch black without the light of the gods or the moon. To symbolically keep the light of their master's knowledge alive:

16 Gana-kings, 9 Malla and 9 Lichchhavi, of Kasi and Kosal, illuminated their doors. They said: "Since the light of knowledge is gone, we will make light of ordinary matter" ("गये से भवुज्जोये, दव्वुज्जोयं करिस्समो").

Dipavali was mentioned in Jain books as the date of the nirvana of Mahavira. In fact, the oldest reference to Diwali is a related word, dipalikaya, which occurs in Harivamsa Purana, written by Acharya Jinasena and composed in the Shaka Samvat era in the year 705.

ततस्तुः लोकः प्रतिवर्षमादरत् प्रसिद्धदीपलिकयात्र भारते |
समुद्यतः पूजयितुं जिनेश्वरं जिनेन्द्र-निर्वाण विभूति-भक्तिभाक् |२० |
tatastuḥ lokaḥ prativarśam ādarat
prasiddha-dīpalikaya-ātra bhārate
samudyataḥ pūjayituṃ jineśvaraṃ
jinendra-nirvāṇa vibhūti-bhaktibhāk

Translation: The gods illuminated Pavanagari by lamps to mark the occasion. Since that time, the people of Bharat celebrate the famous festival of "Dipalika" to worship the Jinendra (i.e. Lord Mahavira) on the occasion of his nirvana.

Dipalikaya roughly translates as "light leaving the body". Dipalika, which can be roughly translated as "splendiferous light of lamps", is used interchangeably with the word "Diwali".

== Jain New Year ==
The Jain year starts with Pratipada following Diwali. Jain calendar is known as Vira Nirvana Samvat and their year 2501 started with Diwali of year 1974. The Jain business people traditionally start their accounting year from Diwali. The relationship between the Vir and Shaka era is given in Titthogali Painnaya and Dhavalaa by Acharya Virasena:
पंच य मासा पंच य वास छच्चेव होन्ति वाससया|
परिणिव्वुअस्स अरिहितो तो उप्पन्नो सगो राया||

Thus the Nirvana occurred 605 years and 5 months before the Saka era.

== Celebration ==
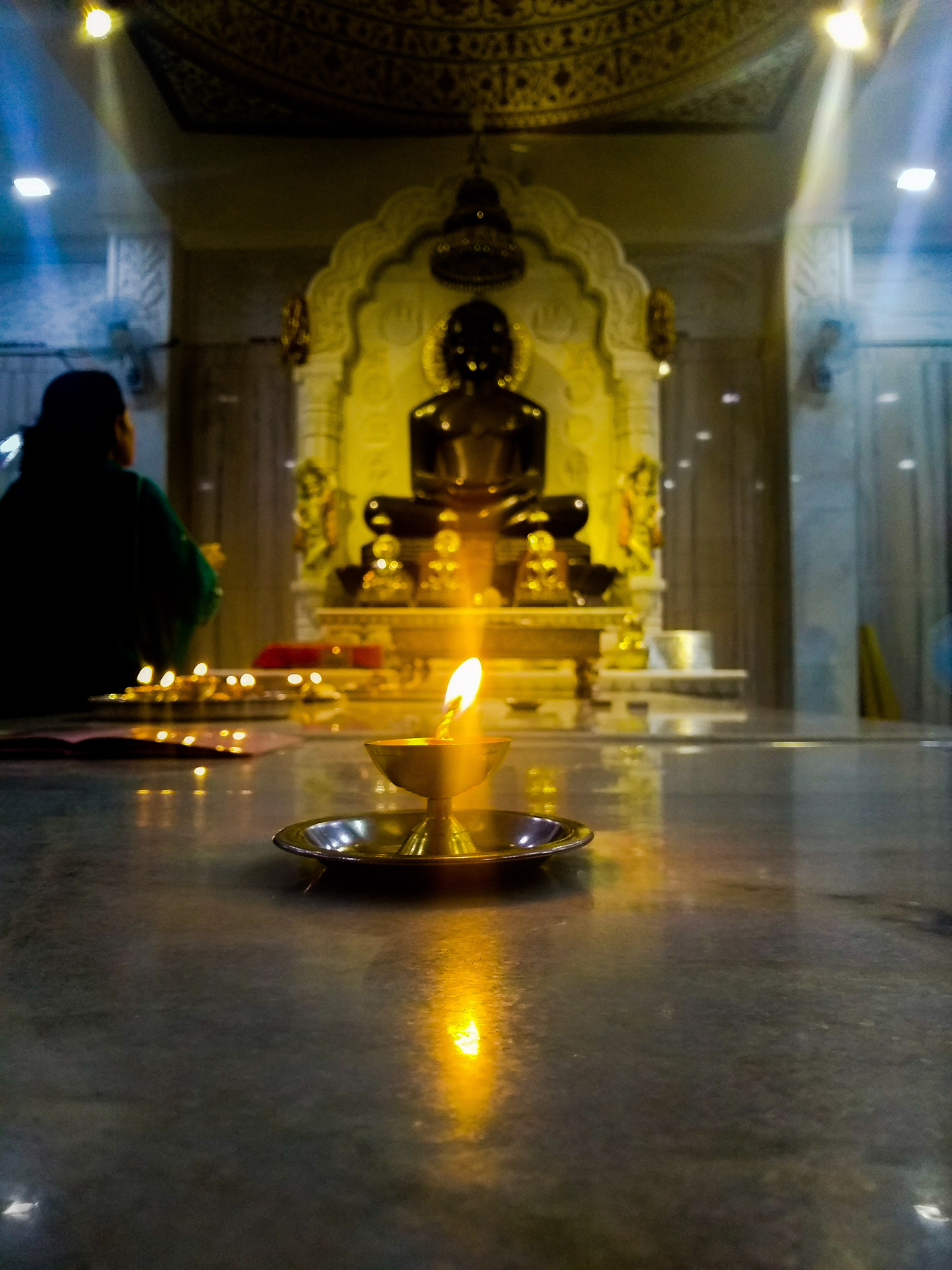
Diya and Tirthankar

On Diwali morning, Nirvan Ladoo is offered after praying to Lord Mahavira in all Jain temples worldwide. The most important principle of Jains is Ahimsa, or non-violence; therefore, most tend to avoid firecrackers during Diwali as they can harm living organisms. Diwali is celebrated in an atmosphere of austerity, simplicity, serenity, equity, calmness, charity, philanthropy, and environmental consciousness. Jain temples, homes, offices, and shops are decorated with lights and diyas. Relatives distribute sweets to each other. The lights symbolize knowledge and the removal of ignorance. Swetambar Jains observe two days of fasting in remembrance of the penance and sacrifice of Mahavira. In temples and homes, devotees sing hymns and chant mantras from Jain religious texts in praise of the Tirthankar, congregating for prayers and reciting verses from the Uttaradhyayan Sutra, which contain the last teachings of Mahavira. Jains also visit Pawapuri and Nalanda in Bihar on this special day to offer their prayers. The Jain year starts with Pratipada, the day after Diwali.

Another longstanding tradition is to purchase new account books or ledgers to bring good luck and prosperity for the new year.

== See also ==
- Diwali
- Imoinu Iratpa
