= Hukka Paati =

Tradition of Diwali in Mithila

हुक्का पाती
- Ukka patti
- Also known: Hookah Patti; Hukka Lolli; Prakash Tarpan; Mithila Deepawali
- Maithils Diwali's ritual; Mithila Diwali Tradition

Performance and play
- Region: Mithila region of India and Nepal
- Occasions: Diwali Puja
- Rituals: Lakshmi Ghar Daridra Bahar
- Hukka Paati: Arwa coloured rice grains, durva grass,

Hukka Paati or hookah patti or ukka patti (Maithili: हुक्का पांती, उक्का-पांती) also known as Mithila Deepawali is a ritualistic tradition and performance played on the occasion of the Diwali Puja in the Mithila region of the Indian subcontinent. The tradition of Hukka Pati symbolizes the invocation of the Goddess Lakshmi in the region. Apart from the symbol of the invocation of the Goddess Lakshmi, it also symbolizes Prakash Tarpan (Offering light) in Hinduism to one's ancestors in the region. It is locally also known as Hukka Lolli.

== Description ==
It is performed on the evening of Diwali Puja, after taking bath and worshipping Goddess Lakshmi and Lord Ganesha. In the performance, all the members of the house light the hookah patti from the diya (lamp) kept in the puja room called Gosaunik Ghar and put it in all the diyas (lamps) of the house. During the performance, they take Arwa rice in one hand and sprinkle it in all rooms of the house and come out from the main gate of the house and gather at the door and play hookah patti together. During the ritualistic process they chant "Lakshmi Ghar Daridra Bahar... Lakshmi Ghar Daridra Bahar" that translates as "Goddess Lakshmi come in the house and poverty go out". At last they take five Sanathis from the remaining part of their hookah patti and keep it in their God's house and pay obeisance to the God, as per the tradition, there is a custom of paying obeisance to the elders in the entire village. After playing Hukka Patti, the elderly woman of the house performs Chumavan to everyone in the family and blesses them, then feeds them sweets. After this, people from every family in the society go to each other's houses to meet and seek blessings. It helps in maintaining social harmony in the society.

After Hukka Paati performance, another nearly similar performance of Hukka Lolli is also performed. In the region, the term Hukka Lolli refers to a ball made from old and torn clothes in the house. It is tied by a metallic strong wire to revolve it around own self by the performer. The hukka lolli ball is prepared a day before the Diwali Puja and is kept immersed in kerosene oil overnight. On the Diwali Puja night it is tied to a long metallic string and then the ball is burn by fire and played rotational performance of the fire ball around own self. It is spun around own self in different circulation paths. It is called as hookah loli.

== Legend ==
According to legend in Mithila region, it is believed that the Maithil people follow this tradition since ancient period. In the tradition, the people of Mithila wish happiness and prosperity of the family, relatives and friends. The Maithils people offer Prakash Tarpan to their ancestors on this evening. On the occasion of Diwali Puja in Mithila, the ancestors of the family are also remembered. In the tradition of Maithil Diwali, a Ulka Bhraman is performed to bid farewell to the ancestors with the lighting of lamps and diyas.
