= Jhalar =

Indian decorative fabric strip

A jhalar (Hindi: झालर, Punjabi: ਝਾਲਰ) is a long thin strip of colorful fabric used for decoration, mostly in India. On festivals such as Diwali and New Year and special occasions such as birthdays or anniversaries, jhalars are used as the main decorating material.

== Description ==
Jhalars come in a variety of colors and shapes, although the main shape is similar to a ribbon. Until some years ago, they were created with paper, but now plastic jhalars are becoming more popular. Plastic jhalars are long-lasting and give a shiny effect due to the material used in their construction.

== Uses ==
Jhalars can be used in a number of ways:

- hanging them on walls in a curvy pattern
- using them to decorate the ceiling
- hanging on bottom of ceiling fans or other objects
