= Bandna =

Traditional festival of East India

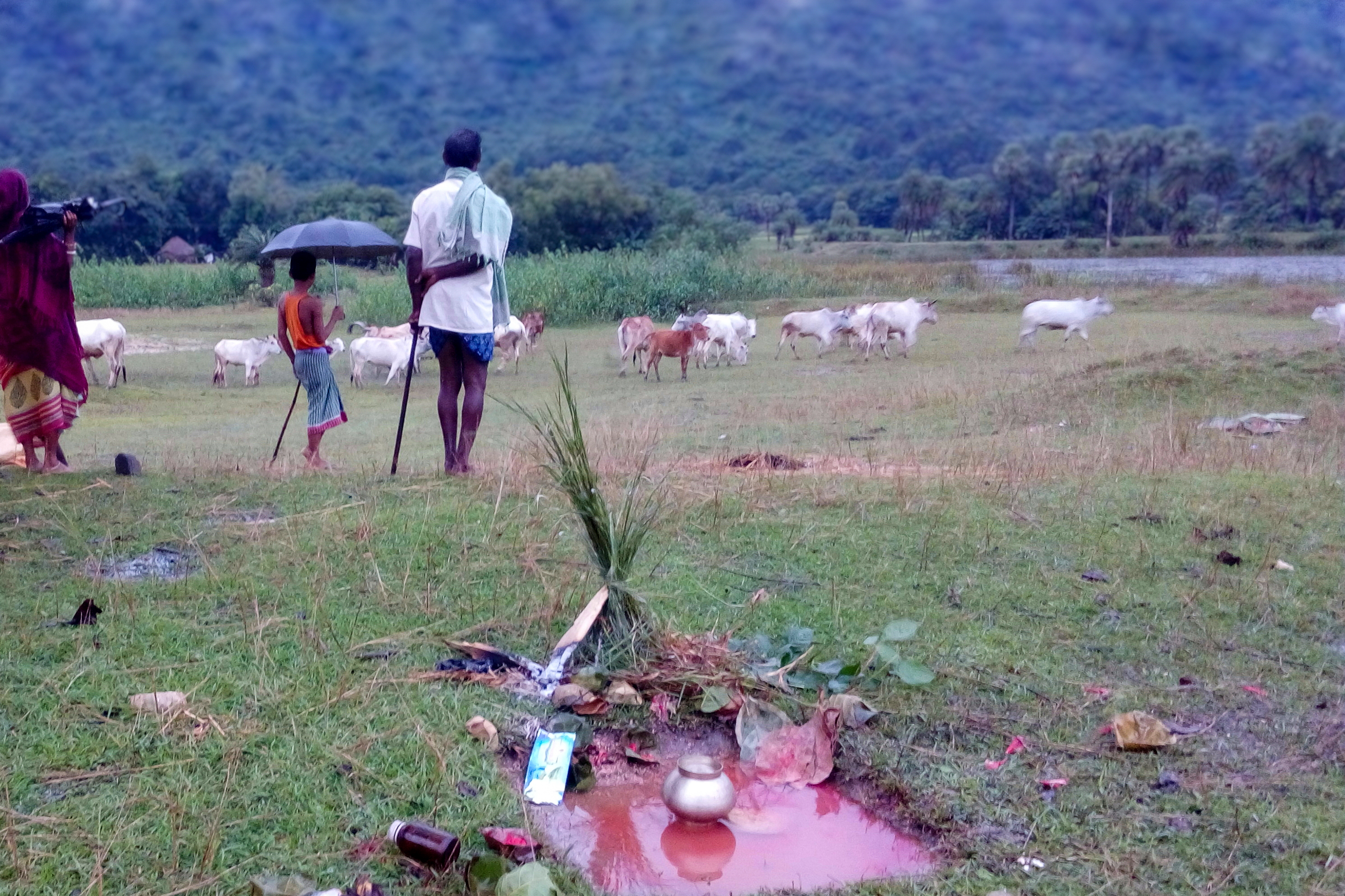
- Bagal with their cattle in the place shrine for Goth puja.
- Observed by: Tribal agriculturist
- Type: Cultural, seasonal
- Significance: Worship of domestic cattle
- Celebrations: performing religious rituals and feast
- Observances: Jagran; Goth puja; Gohail puja; Goru Khunta; Budhi Bandna
- Begins: October
- Ends: November
- Date: Amavasya of Kartik
- Duration: 1 week
- Frequency: Annual

Bandna (spelt as Bāndnā, Hindi: बांदना) is an agriculture-oriented festival in which domestic cattle and agriculture appliances are worshiped. The festival mostly observed in the state of Jharkhand, West Bengal, Odisha and Assam, and celebrated annually as per Hindu calendar in the month of Amavashya of Kartik.

== Overview ==
Bandna is a celebration of the paddy seeds that are sown by the region's agrarian communities. This festival is celebrated by the Kudmi Mahato tribes of East India. It is one of many Indian festivals during which cattle are worshiped.

== Celebration ==
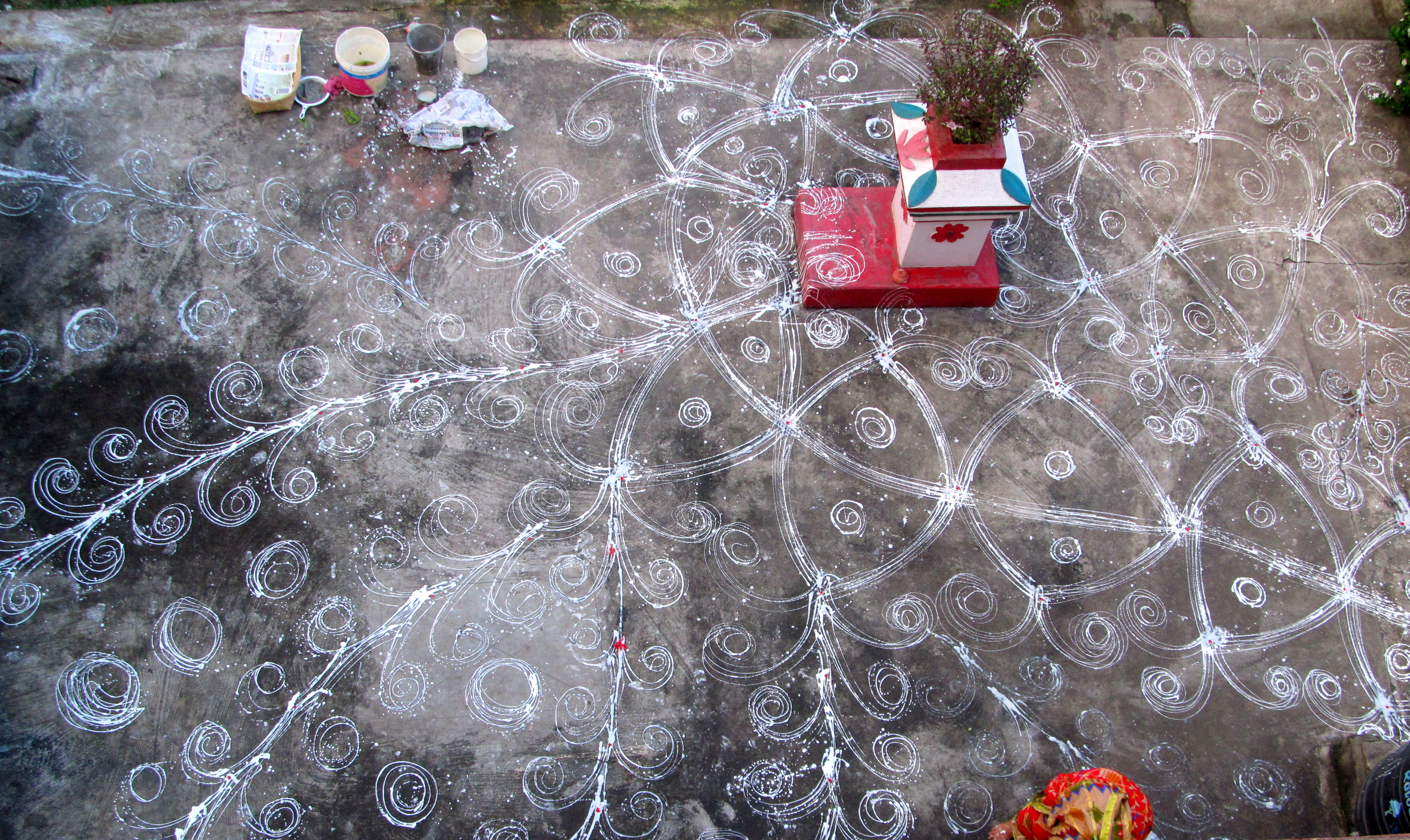
Floor painting during Bandna parab

Bandna is a seven-day festival: the first three days are Chumaan; the fourth day is Goth Puja; the fifth day is Goriyaa Puja; the sixth day is Borod Khuntaan; and the seventh day is Budhi Bandna. The rituals of the first three days are sometimes extended to five days prior to Goth Puja.

== Myth ==
Lord Shiva (Burha Baba) created humans; he provided them with food. In due course, they multiplied into a sizeable population. Shiva advised them to produce their own food by cultivating the land. However, without agricultural implements and technology, farmers had many problems. They beseeched the lord for a solution. Shiva took pity on them and provided them with cattle. Initially, the relationship between the people and the cattle was cordial, but over time, it worsened and the cattle were abused. The cattle complained to Shiva. The complaint encompassed strenuous work, extended work hours, inadequate food, unhygienic shelters, beatings, lack of recreation and ingratitude towards their contribution. The lord assured them that he would inspect secretly on the night of Kartik Amavasya. The people became aware of the complaints, so the people cleaned their houses and cowsheds, and on the day of Amavasya, the cattle were properly washed while their horns and foreheads were smeared with oil and vermilion. The cattle were provided with fodder and the Gohal (cowshed) was illuminated with Diyas (earthen lamps). Bundles of grass were put along with Diyas on both sides of the entrance of the cowshed. Sohrai grass was placed on the roof to signify the availability of food for the cattle. On the second day, Shiva found the people worshiping Garaiya with special offerings, including a sacrifice made in their honour. On the third day, he observed that the cattle were in a merry mood, dancing with the people. The songs and the music filled the air with warmth, enthusiasm and harmony. On his way back, he found the Bagals/Dhangars (contractual herder) playing with the cattle at the gochar (grazing land). This made the complaint invalid. The next season, the cattle complained again about hardships, prompting Shiva to inspect them on the same day. The lord made a secret visit, finding the cattle happy and content. Since then, the tradition continued and is annually celebrated as Bandna Parab.

== See also ==
- Karam
