= List of festivals in Nepal =

This is a partial listing of festivals in Nepal.

== B ==
- Bagh Bhairav Jatra
- Bala Chaturdashi
- Balihang Tangnam
- Bajrayogini Jatra
- Bijayadashami
- Bishwakarma Puja
- Brahma marriage
- Bratabandha
- Bhai Tika
- Bisket Jatra
- Buddha Jayanti

== C ==
- Chasok Tangnam
- Chhath
- Chhechu
- Christmas

== D ==
- Dashain
- Deuda
- Deusi/Bhailo

== E ==
- Eid al-Fitr
- Ekadashi

== G ==
- Gai Jatra
- Ganesh Chaturthi
- Ghanta Karna
- Ghode Jatra
- Guru Purnima

== H ==
- Holi

== I ==
- Indra Jatra

== J ==
- Jana Baha Dyah Jatra
- Janai Purnima

== K ==
- Kaag Tihar
- Kakphekwa Tangnam
- Kartika Purnima
- Krishna Janmashtami
- Kukur Tihar
- Kushe Aunsi

== L ==
- Lakshmi Puja
- Losar

== M ==
- Maghe Purnima
- Maghe Sankranti
- Maha Shivaratri
- Matatirtha Aunsi
- Mohani

== N ==
- Naga Panchami
- National Paddy Day
- Naurata
- Nepali New Year
- Nwagi festival

== P ==
- Pahan Charhe
- Pancha Dan

== R ==
- Raksha Bandhan
- Rato Machindranath Jatra
- Rishi Panchami

== S ==
- Sakela
- Sama Chakeva
- Saraswati Puja
- Seto Machindranath
- Sisekpa Tangnam
- Sithi-Diyo Jatra
- Sorah Shraddha

== T ==
- Teej
- Tihar (festival)

== V ==
- Vivaha Panchami

== W ==
- Wadangmet

== Y ==
- Yomari Punhi

== See also ==
- Public holidays in Nepal
- List of Hindu festivals in Nepal
- List of Jatras in Nepal
- List of festivals in Asia
- Lists of festivals
