= List of Hindu festivals in Nepal =

Explanatory note on Hindu festival dates
- The Hindu calendar is lunisolar but most festival dates are specified using the lunar portion of the calendar. A lunar day is uniquely identified by three calendar elements: māsa (lunar month), pakṣa (lunar fortnight) and tithi (lunar day). Furthermore, when specifying the masa, one of two traditions are applicable, viz. amānta / pūrṇimānta. If a festival falls in the waning phase of the moon, these two traditions identify the same lunar day as falling in two different (but successive) masa. A lunar year is shorter than a solar year by about eleven days. As a result, most Hindu festivals occur on different days in successive years on the Gregorian calendar.

Hindu festivals in Nepal are celebrated throughout the year according to the Bikram Sambat and Nepal Sambat calendars. Many of these festivals are also shared with other local religions and are celebrated in other countries.

== B ==
- Brahma marriage
- Bratabandha
- Bijayadashami
- Bisket Jatra
- Bishwakarma Puja
- Bhai Tika
- Buddha Jayanti

== C ==
- Chhath

== D ==
- Dashain
- Deusi/Bhailo

== E ==
- Ekadashi

== G ==
- Gai Jatra
- Ganesh Chaturthi
- Ghanta Karna
- Guru Purnima

== H ==
- Holi

== I ==
- Indra Jatra

== J ==
- Janai Purnima
- Jana Baha Dyah Jatra

== K ==
- Kaag Tihar
- Kartika Purnima
- Krishna Janmashtami
- Kukur Tihar
- Kushe Aunsi

== L ==
- Lakshmi Puja

== M ==
- Maghe Sankranti
- Maha Shivaratri
- Matatirtha Aunsi
- Mohani

== N ==
- Naga Panchami
- Naurata
- Nepali New Year

== P ==
- Pahan Charhe
- Pancha Dan

== R ==
- Raksha Bandhan
- Rato Machindranath Jatra
- Rishi Panchami

== S ==
- Sama Chakeva
- Saraswati Puja
- Seto Machindranath
- Sorah Shraddha

== T ==
- Teej
- Tihar

== V ==
- Vivaha Panchami

== Y ==
- Yomari Punhi

== See also ==
- List of festivals in Nepal
- List of Jatras in Nepal
- Hinduism in Nepal
- The Buddha in Hinduism
