= Kaag Tihar =

Annual festival from Nepal honouring crows and ravens

- Crows eating food offerings
- Official name: Kaag Tihar
- Observed by: Nepal, and regions with large Nepalese populations
- Type: Religious, cultural
- Significance: Honoring and worshipping crow and raven
- Observances: Prayers and religious
- Date: Kārtika; Thrayodashi; Krishna Paksha
- 2026 date: 7 November
- 2027 date: TBA (Note: The exact dates of Nepalese Hindu festivals are announced each year by the Government of Nepal after the official calendar is finalized. The dates are determined through annual Panchang (Hindu calendar) circulations based on the Bikram Sambat, the official calendar of Nepal. Once the circumstances are completed, the government publishes the annual calendar, which includes festivals days and public holidays.)
- Frequency: Annual
- Related to: Tihar

Explanatory note on Hindu festival dates
- The Hindu calendar is lunisolar but most festival dates are specified using the lunar portion of the calendar. A lunar day is uniquely identified by three calendar elements: māsa (lunar month), pakṣa (lunar fortnight) and tithi (lunar day). Furthermore, when specifying the masa, one of two traditions are applicable, viz. amānta / pūrṇimānta. If a festival falls in the waning phase of the moon, these two traditions identify the same lunar day as falling in two different (but successive) masa. A lunar year is shorter than a solar year by about eleven days. As a result, most Hindu festivals occur on different days in successive years on the Gregorian calendar.

Kaag Tihar (Nepali: काग तिहार) is an annual Hindu festival originating from Nepal. It is celebrated on the first day of the five-day Tihar festival, it is dedicated to worship and honoring of crows and ravens. The day is observed as a public holiday in Nepal.

The festival follows the Nepal's national Bikram Sambat calendar and takes place during the lunar month of Kartik (typically falling between October or mid-November in the Georgian calendar). It falls on the first day of the five-day Tihar festival.

== Etymology ==
The name Kaag Tihar comes from two Nepali words: Kaag (काग), meaning "crow" or "raven," and Tihar (तिहार) is the name of the five-day-long festival. The term therefore translates to "Crow/Raven Tihar" or "Festival of Crow and Raven."

== Origin ==
In Hinduism, crows and ravens are considered messengers of Yama, the god of death and justice. They are believed to carry messages from Yama and are therefore worshipped during Kaag Tihar in Nepal.

According to traditional Nepalese beliefs, the calls and flight directions of crows are associated with future events. This practice is known as Shagun Shastra (science of omen), which involves predicting outcomes from bird calls and flight patterns. When a crow or raven perches near a home and caws, people traditionally chant "Bol, bol, subha bol" ("Speak, speak, speak good omens"), hoping it will bring good news.

Traditional beliefs interpret the direction of a crow's flight as follows:

- East: Progress, growth, and prosperity.
- North: Achievement, success, and good fortune.
- West: Loss, obstacles, or setbacks.
- South: Sorrow, mourning, or misfortune.

Devotees worship and feed crows to appease Yama, believing the ritual protects their families from death, sorrow, and misfortune in the coming year.

== Celebrations ==
=== Kaag Tihar ===
Devotees celebrate Kaag Tihar by offering grains, seeds, sweets, cooked rice, and other food to crows and ravens on rooftops, in courtyards, and along streets. Feeding these birds is believed to appease them and protect families from sorrow and untimely death.

People also celebrates the day by visiting and worshipping at the following temples:

- Kageshwori Mahadev Temple: Located in the northeastern hills of the Kathmandu Valley, in Kageshwari-Manohara Municipality, the temple hosts the annual Kageshwori festival, where devotees gather to offer prayers and worship the Shivalinga.
- Kageshwor Mahadev Temple: Located within the Kathmandu Durbar Square, the temple is a traditional place of worship for devotees observing rituals associated with crows and ravens during the festival.

Kageshwor Mahadev Temple, Kathmandu Durbar Square

=== Yama Deepdaan ===
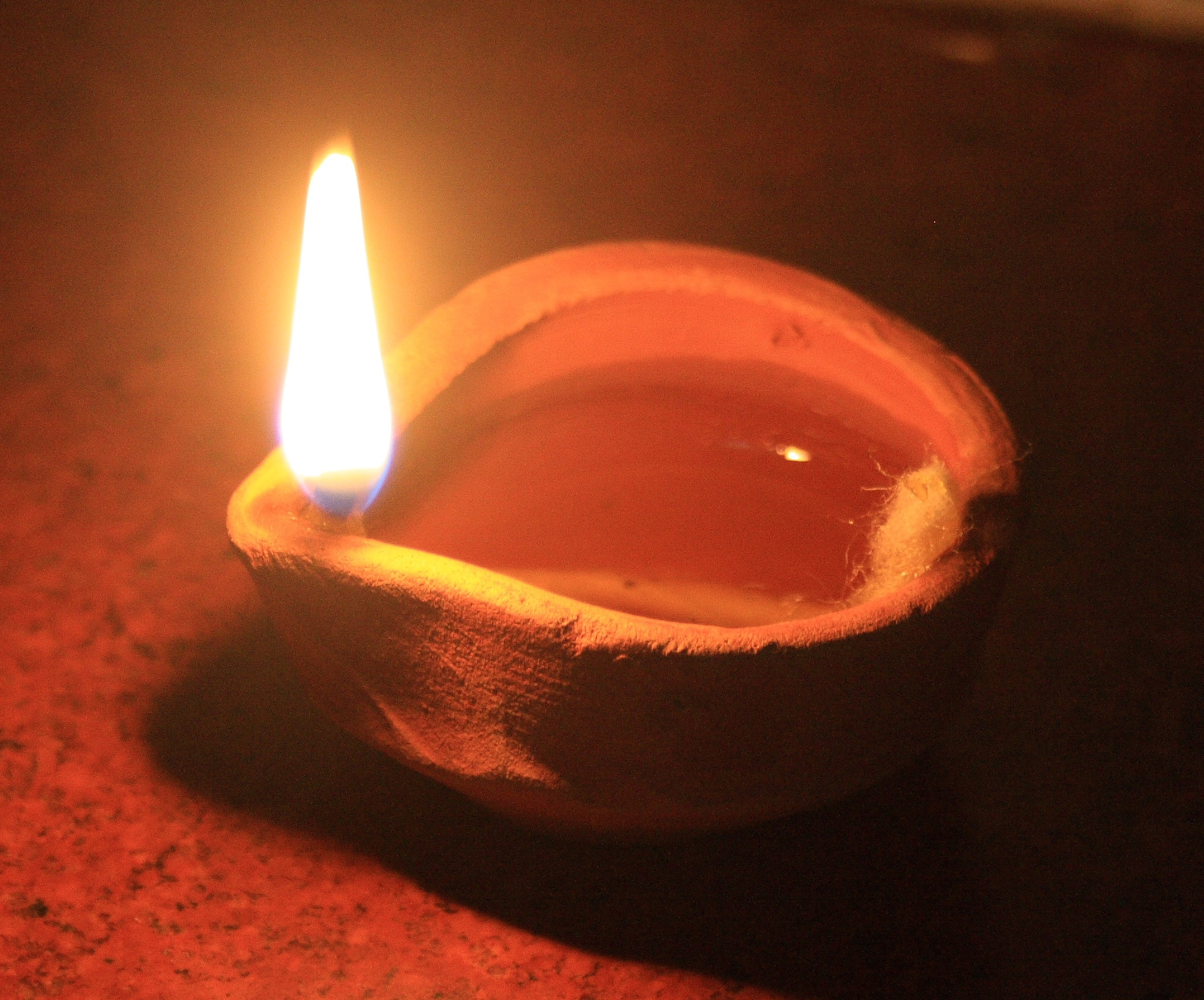
A clay oil lamp (diyo)

Yama Deepdaan is a traditional ritual performed during Tihar, beginning on the evening of Kaag Tihar. People light oil lamps made of brass, copper, or clay, known as diyo outside their homes facing south, the cardinal direction associated with Yama, the god of death. The lamps are kept lit every day throughout the evening and night until the end of the festival. The ritual is believed to please Yama and protect family members from untimely death and misfortune.

=== Cultural Practices ===
During Tihar, cities and homes across Nepal are lit with colorful lamps and decorative lights. People celebrate by performing Deusi and Bhailo, traditional folk carols performed by groups while visiting homes in their neighborhoods.

Playing card games, dice, and other traditional games is common during Tihar. These games are traditionally enjoyed as part of the festivities, although excessive gambling is a concern due to financial risks involved. Gambling is prohibited by law in Nepal, including during the festival. Public authorities also discourage the use of firecrackers to prevent accidents, injuries, property fires, and distress to animals caused by loud noises.

== See also ==
- Tihar
- Kukur Tihar
- Dhanteras
- Ghode Jatra
- List of festivals in Nepal
