= Dhanteras =

Hindu observance

Dhanatrayodashi
- Dhanvantari Puja performed on the occasion
- Official name: धनतेरस
- Also called: Dhanatrayodashi
- Observed by: Hindus
- Significance: Celebrated to seek blessings for wealth, prosperity, good health and happiness.
- Date: Ashvin 28 (amanta tradition); Kartika 13 (purnimanta tradition)
- 2026 date: 6 November
- Frequency: Annual
- Related to: Diwali

Explanatory note on Hindu festival dates
- The Hindu calendar is lunisolar but most festival dates are specified using the lunar portion of the calendar. A lunar day is uniquely identified by three calendar elements: māsa (lunar month), pakṣa (lunar fortnight) and tithi (lunar day). Furthermore, when specifying the masa, one of two traditions are applicable, viz. amānta / pūrṇimānta. If a festival falls in the waning phase of the moon, these two traditions identify the same lunar day as falling in two different (but successive) masa. A lunar year is shorter than a solar year by about eleven days. As a result, most Hindu festivals occur on different days in successive years on the Gregorian calendar.

Dhanteras (Hindi: धनतेरस), also known as Dhanatrayodashi (Sanskrit: धनत्रयोदशी), is the first day that marks the festival of Diwali or Tihar in most of India and Nepal. It is celebrated on the trayodashi (thirteenth lunar day) of Krishna Paksha (dark-fortnight) in the Hindu calendar month of Ashvin (according to the amānta tradition) or Kartika (according to the Vikram Samvat tradition).

== Etymology ==
Dhanteras is a Hindu festival honoring the deity Dhanvantari and a celebration of wealth and health. The term Dhanteras is derived from the Sanskrit dhana ('wealth') and the Hindi teras ('the thirteenth day of a lunar fortnight'), itself derived from the Sanskrit trayodashi, denoting the specific day of the lunar fortnight on which the festival falls.

In Jainism, this day is celebrated as Dhanyateras, which means the "auspicious day of thirteenth". It is believed to mark the day Mahavira renounced the world and meditated before attaining moksha, which made the day dhanya (auspicious).

== Legends and literature ==
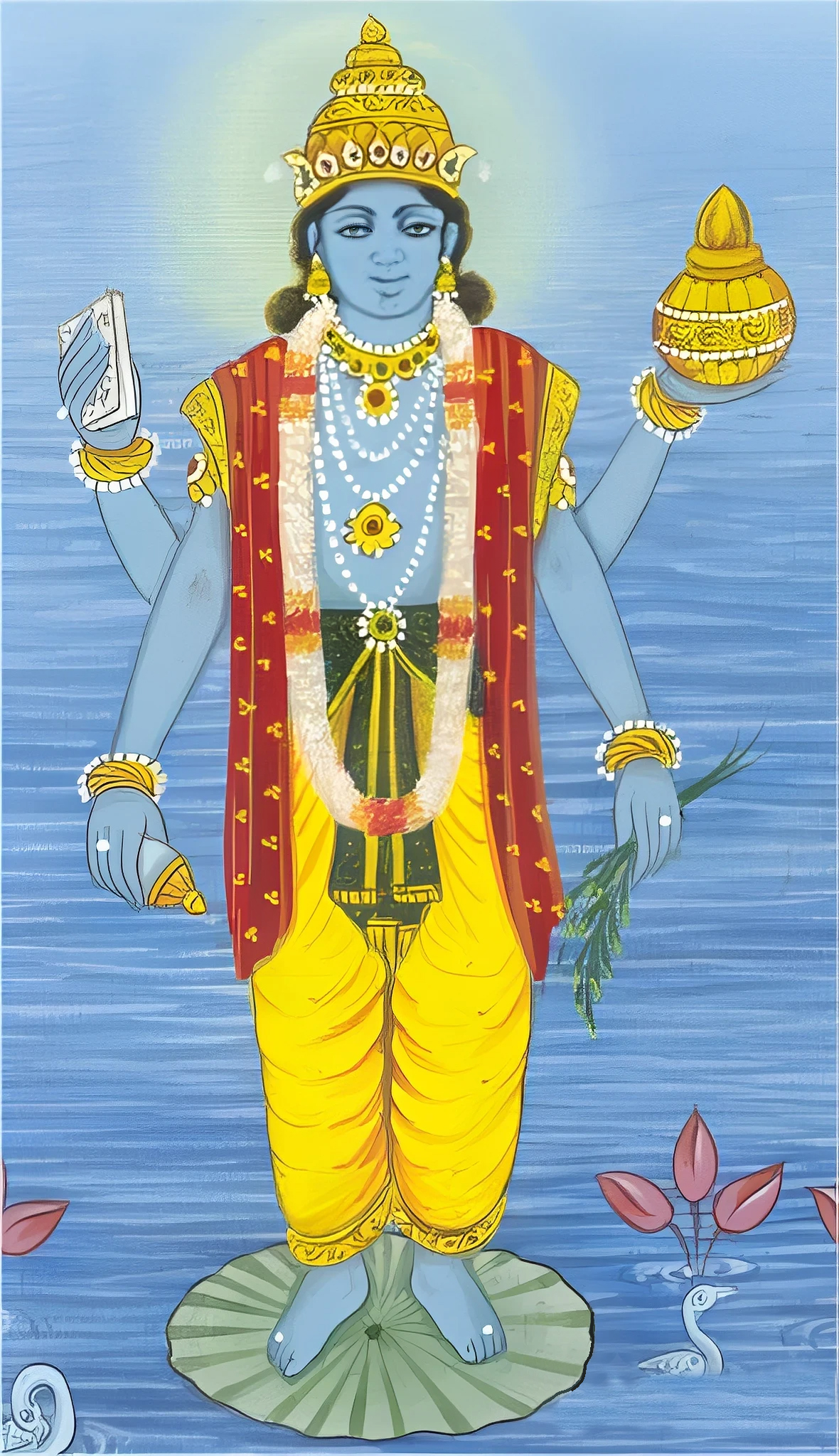
Painting of Dhanvantari

=== Emergence of Dhanvantari ===
According to the Vishnu Purana, Dhanvantari, the physician of the gods, was among the many beings and treasures that emerged during the Samudra Manthana (churning of the ocean), holding a jar of amrita (the nectar of immortality). He is worshipped as an avatar of Vishnu.

The festival of Dhanteras marks the day of his emergence, symbolising the restoration of cosmic balance and prosperity.

=== Yama and the Prince ===
According to legend, Yama, the god of death, arrived to take the life of a sixteen-year-old prince, the son of King Hima, on the fourth day of his marriage. The prince's new wife blocked the doorway of their bedchamber with a large pile of her jewellery, coins, and diyas (oil lamps). Yama, blinded by the lights, took the form of a serpent, and slithered into the room upon the coins. However, he was so moved by the wife's melodious singing that he spared the prince's life. Yama is thus venerated and evil spirits driven away on Dhanteras by the lighting of lamps.

== Observances ==
On Dhanteras, homes that have not yet been cleaned in preparation for Diwali are thoroughly cleansed. The main entrance is decorated with colourful lanterns and holiday lights. Traditional motifs of rangoli designs are made to welcome Lakshmi, the goddess of wealth and prosperity. In the evening, Lakshmi Puja is performed in worship of the goddess with the chanting of bhajans, offerings of sweets, and veneration of the tulasi plant. Small footprints are drawn with rice flour and vermilion powder all over the house to indicate her long-awaited arrival. Dhanvantari Puja is performed in veneration of Dhanvantari. Diyas are ritually kept burning throughout the night in honour of Lakshmi and Dhanvantari. The diyas are also considered an offering to Yama to avert untimely death during Diwali, in a practice called yamadipadana. Thirteen diyas made of wheat flour are lit and placed facing the southern direction. The festival engages themes of cleansing, renewal, and the securing of auspiciousness as embodied by Lakshmi.

Hindus consider Dhanteras an auspicious day for making new purchases, especially of gold or silver articles, new utensils, and other kitchenware. It is believed that new dhana (wealth) or items made of precious metals is a sign of good luck. The day also sees heavy purchases of appliances and automobiles.

The Indian Ministry of Ayurveda, Yoga and Naturopathy, Unani, Siddha and Homeopathy announced its decision to observe Dhanteras as the "National Ayurveda Day", which was first observed on 28 October 2016.

=== Regional traditions ===
In South India (especially Tamil Nadu), Brahmin women make marundu ('medicine') on Dhanatrayodashi, on the eve of Naraka Chaturdashi. The marundu is offered during prayer and eaten early on Naraka Chaturdashi before sunrise. The marundu is consumed to eliminate the imbalance of tridoshas in the body, according to ayurveda.

In Maharashtra, adherents lightly pound dried coriander seeds with jaggery and offer the mixture as naivedya.

In Gujarat, families will enjoy a meal of daal baath and malpua to ring in the new year.

In the villages, cattle are adorned and worshipped by farmers as their main source of income.

== See also ==
- Lakshmi Puja
- Diwali
