= Bhai Dooj =

Hindu festival

- Also called: Bhai Tika, Bhau Beej, Bhai Phonta, Bhai Phota, Bhratri Dwitiya
- Observed by: Hindus
- Type: Religious
- Significance: Honours brother and sister love, connection, and togetherness
- Date: Kartika 2 (amanta tradition); Kartika 17 (purnimanta tradition)
- 2026 date: 11 November
- Frequency: Annual

Explanatory note on Hindu festival dates
- The Hindu calendar is lunisolar but most festival dates are specified using the lunar portion of the calendar. A lunar day is uniquely identified by three calendar elements: māsa (lunar month), pakṣa (lunar fortnight) and tithi (lunar day). Furthermore, when specifying the masa, one of two traditions are applicable, viz. amānta / pūrṇimānta. If a festival falls in the waning phase of the moon, these two traditions identify the same lunar day as falling in two different (but successive) masa. A lunar year is shorter than a solar year by about eleven days. As a result, most Hindu festivals occur on different days in successive years on the Gregorian calendar.

Bhai Dooj, Bhai Tika, Bhaubeej, Bhaiya Dooj, Bhai Beej, Bhai Phonta, Bhai Phota or Bhratri Dwitiya is a festival celebrated by Hindus on the second lunar day of the Shukla Paksha (bright fortnight) of Kartika, the eighth month of the Vikram Samvat Hindu calendar or the Shalivahana Shaka calendar. It is celebrated during the Diwali or Tihar festival and Holi festival. Bhai Dooj is a Hindu festival celebrating the relationship between brothers and sisters. The celebrations of this day are similar to the festival of Raksha Bandhan.

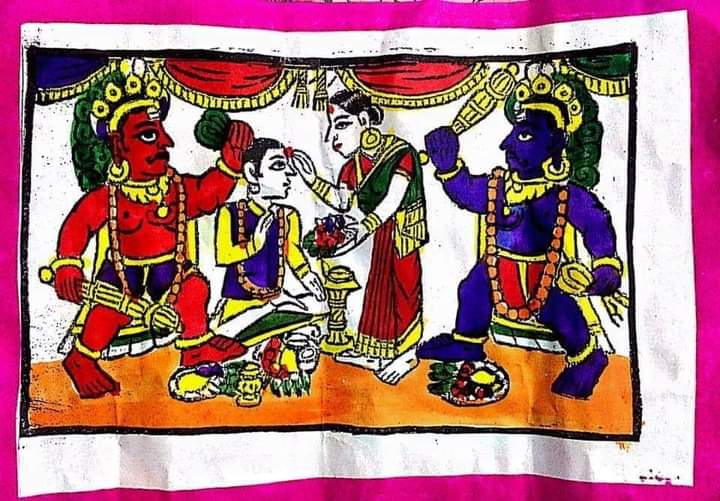
A traditional Newari painting about Kija puja's legend.

In the southern part of India, the day is celebrated as Yama Dwitiya. In the Kayastha community, two Bhai Doojs are celebrated. The more famous one occurs on the second day after Diwali. But the lesser-known one is celebrated a day or two after Diwali. In Haryana and Uttar Pradesh a ritual is also followed, a dry coconut (named gola in regional language) with klewa tied along its width for worshipping is also used at the time of doing aarti of a brother. In Bengal, the day is celebrated as Bhai Phota, which comes one day after Kali Puja.

== Regional Variations ==
The festival is known as:

- Bhai Dooj (Hindi: भाई दूज) in the entire Northern part of India, observed during the Diwali festival. In Awadh and Purvanchal regions of Uttar Pradesh and Bihar, it is also known as Bhaiya Dooj. It is widely celebrated by Maithils in Nepal and Bihar as Bhardutiya and people from various other ethnic groups. The first day of this New Year is observed as Govardhan Pūja.
- Bhai Teeka (Nepali: भाइटीका) in Nepal, where it is the most important festival after Dashain (Vijaya Dashmi / Dussehra). Observed on the fifth day of Tihar festival, it is widely celebrated by Maithils in Nepal as Bhardutiya Bhai Tika followed by the people of various other ethnic groups among Madhesis. While, the Newaris celebrate it as Kija Puja. The sisters put a vertical Tika of seven colours known as Saptarangi Tika in their brother's forehead.
- Bhai Phonta (Bengali: ভাই ফোঁটা) or Bhai Phota in Bengal and it takes place every year on the second day after Kali Puja. It is mainly observed in West Bengal, Tripura, Bangladesh.
- Bhai Jiuntia (Odia: ଭାଇ ଜିଉନ୍ତିଆ) only in western Odisha.
- Bhau Beej, or Bhav Bij (Marathi: भाऊ बीज) or Bhai Beej amongst the Marathi, Gujarati and Konkani-speaking communities in the states of Maharashtra, Goa, Gujarat and Karnataka.
- Another name for the day is Yamadwitheya or Yamadvitiya, after a legendary meeting between Yama the god of Death and his sister Yamuna (the famous river) on Dwitheya (the second day after new moon).
- Other names include Bhatru Dviteeya, or Bhatri Ditya or Bhaghini Hastha Bhojanamu in Andhra Pradesh and Telangana.

According to Hindu religion, after slaying the evil demon Narakasura, Lord Krishna visited his sister Subhadra who gave him a warm welcome with sweets and flowers. She also affectionately applied tilaka on Krishna's forehead. Some believe this to be the origin of the festival.

== The ceremony ==
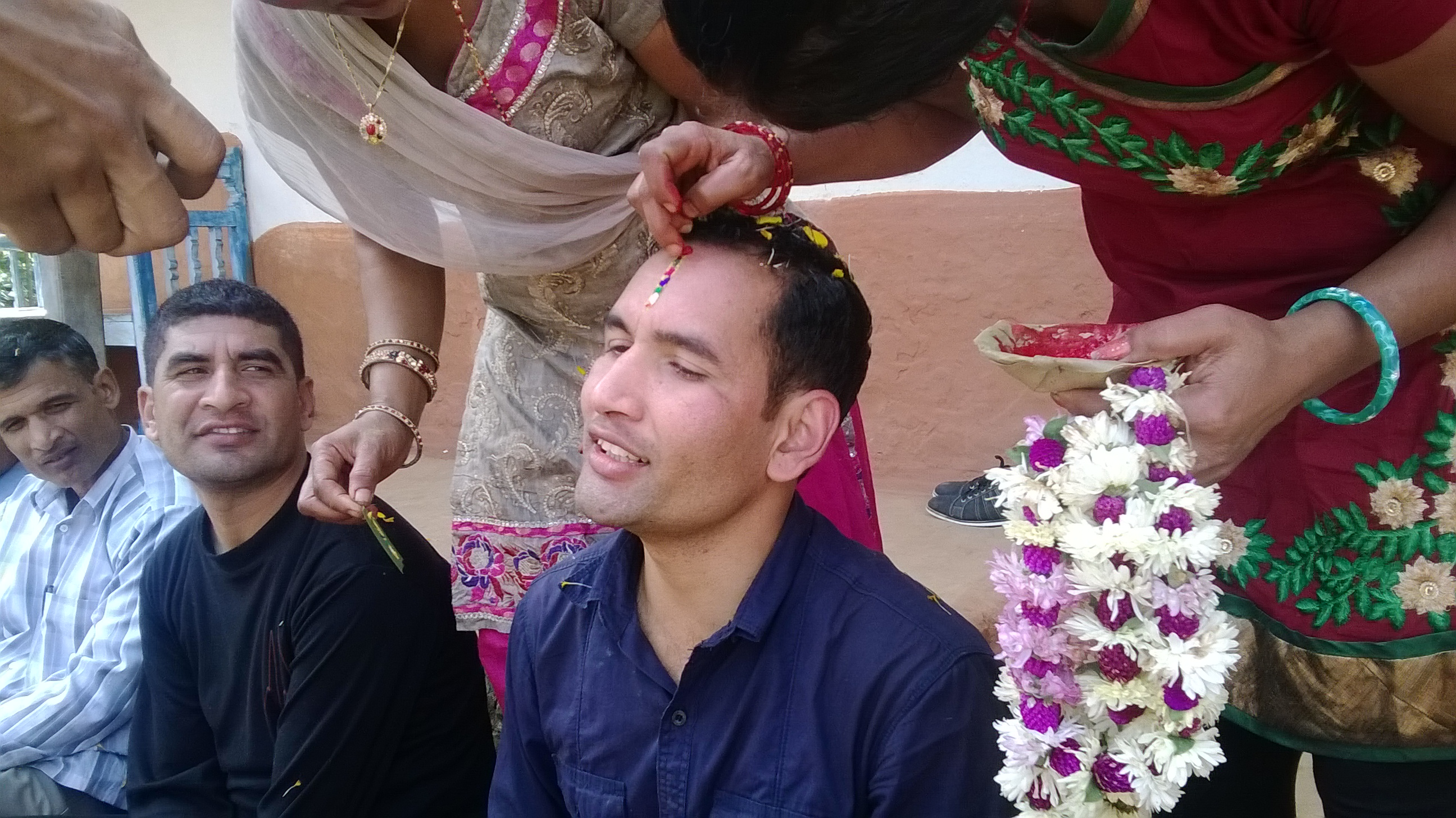
Tilak of seven colors used in Nepalese celebration

On the day of the festival, sisters invite their brothers for a sumptuous meal often including their favourite dishes/sweets. The procedure may be different in Bihar and central India. The whole ceremony signifies the duty of a brother to protect his sister, as well as a sister's blessings for her brother.

Carrying forward the ceremony in traditional style, sisters perform arti for their brother and apply a red tika on the brother's forehead. This tika ceremony on the occasion of Bhai Bij signifies the sister's sincerest prayers for the long and happy life of her brother and treat them with gifts. In return, elder brothers bless their sisters and may treat them also with gifts or cash.

As it is customary in Haryana and Maharashtra to celebrate the auspicious occasion of Bhau-beej, women who do not have a brother worship the Moon Chandra instead. They apply mehendi on girls as their tradition. The sister whose brother lives far away from her and cannot go to her house, sends her sincerest prayers for the long and happy life of her brother through the moon god. She performs aarti for the Moon. This is the reason why children of Hindu parents affectionately call the Moon Chandamama (Chanda means moon and mama means mother's brother).

== The celebration ==
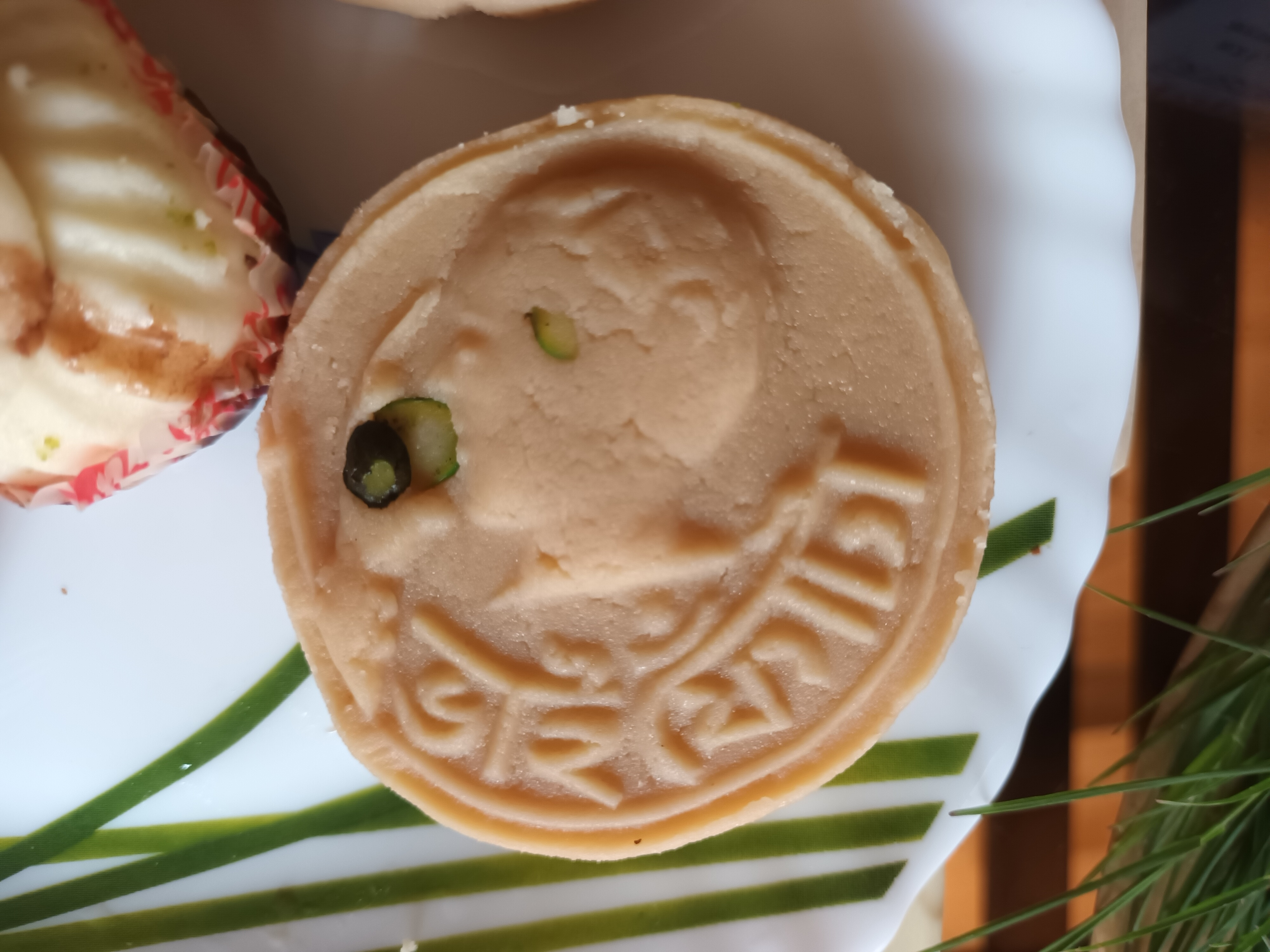
Sandesh with the word 'Bhaiphonta' written is offered by Bengali sisters during Bhai Phonta.

=== Bhai Phonta ===
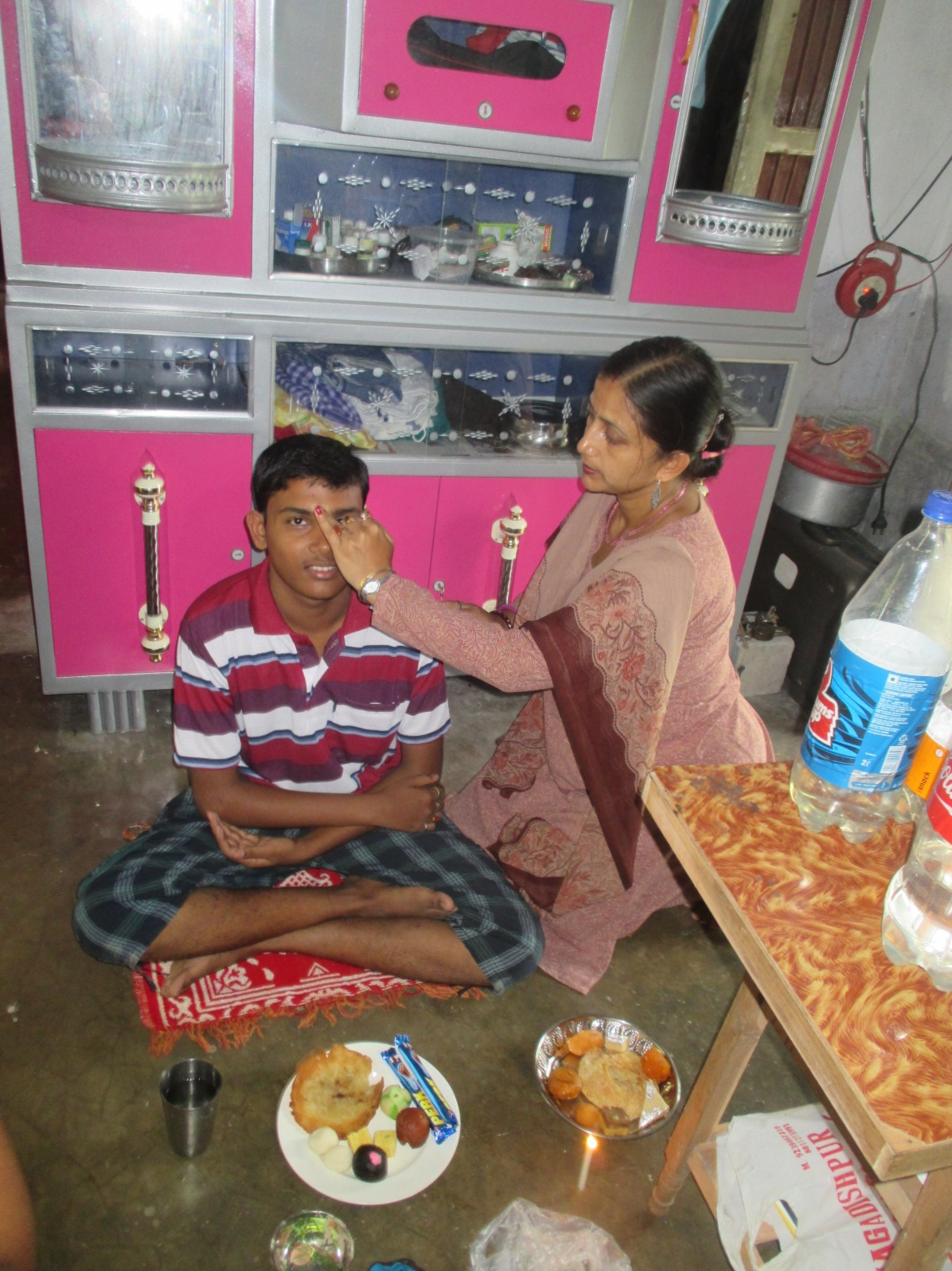
Bhai Phonta at a Bengali household in West Bengal, India.

Bhai Phonta in West Bengal is celebrated with much splendour. The ceremony is marked with many rituals along with a grand feast arranged for the brothers. It is necessary that, both brother and sister are more than 5 years of age.

=== Bhai Bij ===
The festival of Bhai Bij is celebrated in Haryana, Gujarat, Maharashtra, and Goa. Bhai Bij gifts are given to brothers from sisters as a token of love and appreciation.

Bhav Bij is a time for family reunions as all brothers and sisters in the family get together. Close relatives and friends are also invited to celebrate the Bhav Bij in many families. Special dishes for the festival include the Maharashtra sweet called basundi poori or kheerni poori. On this occasion, brothers and sisters exchange gifts. And both of them pray for their long and happy life.

=== Bhai Tika in Nepal ===
Bhai Tika in Nepal is also known as Bhai Tihar meaning Tihar (festival) of brothers. On this day, sisters pray to Yamraj for a long life and prosperity for their brothers. The ritual involves sisters marking the forehead of their brothers with a seven coloured long tika. The rest of the ritual is similar to that performed by Hindus elsewhere. A special garland of the Gomphrena globosa flower is made by the sister as an offering to their brothers.

== Rabindranath Tagore and the Partition of Bengal ==
Rachel Fell McDermott, Professor of Asian Studies at Columbia University, describes Rabindranath Tagore's rakhi-bandhan ceremonies, inspired by the Bhai Dooj ritual, which were organized to protest the 1905 Partition of Bengal

In 1905 Rabindranath Tagore extended the symbolism of Brother's Second, a ritual of bonding between brothers and sisters that is celebrated right after the Pujas have concluded, to evoke friendship between Hindus and Muslims: members of both communities would tie red threads of brotherhood on each other's wrists. All throughout the partition period, these rakhi-bandhan ceremonies were regularly announced in the Bengali and English papers. In addition, some landlords, even the British Indian Association, saw that the boycott and emphasis upon swadeshi items were disturbing peace with rural Muslims in their areas, and withdrew their support.
