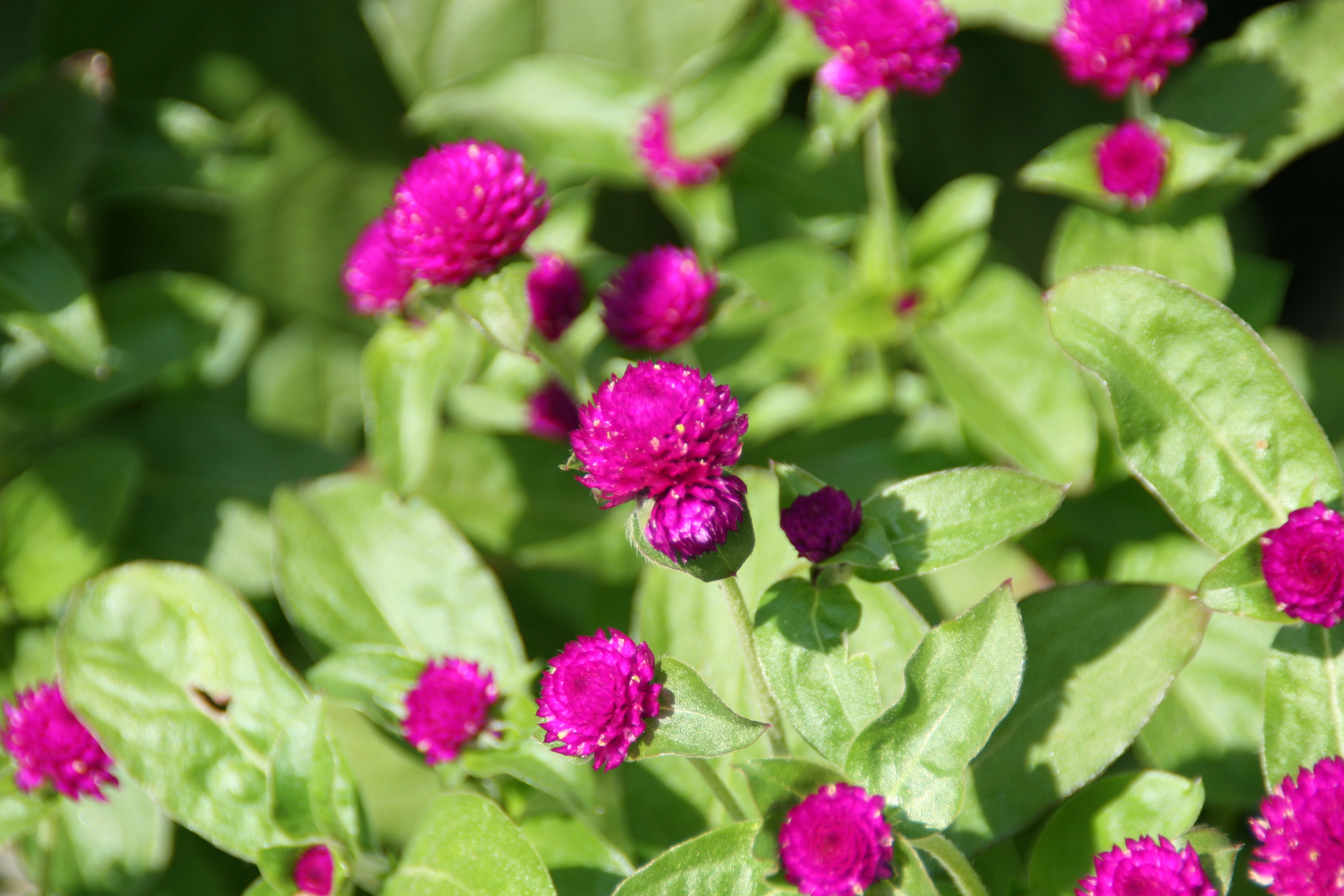
- Purple-flowered form

Scientific classification
- Kingdom: Plantae
- Clade: Tracheophytes
- Clade: Angiosperms
- Clade: Eudicots
- Order: Caryophyllales
- Family: Amaranthaceae
- Genus: Gomphrena
- Species: G. globosa

Binomial name
- Gomphrena globosa L.

= Gomphrena globosa =

Species of flowering plant

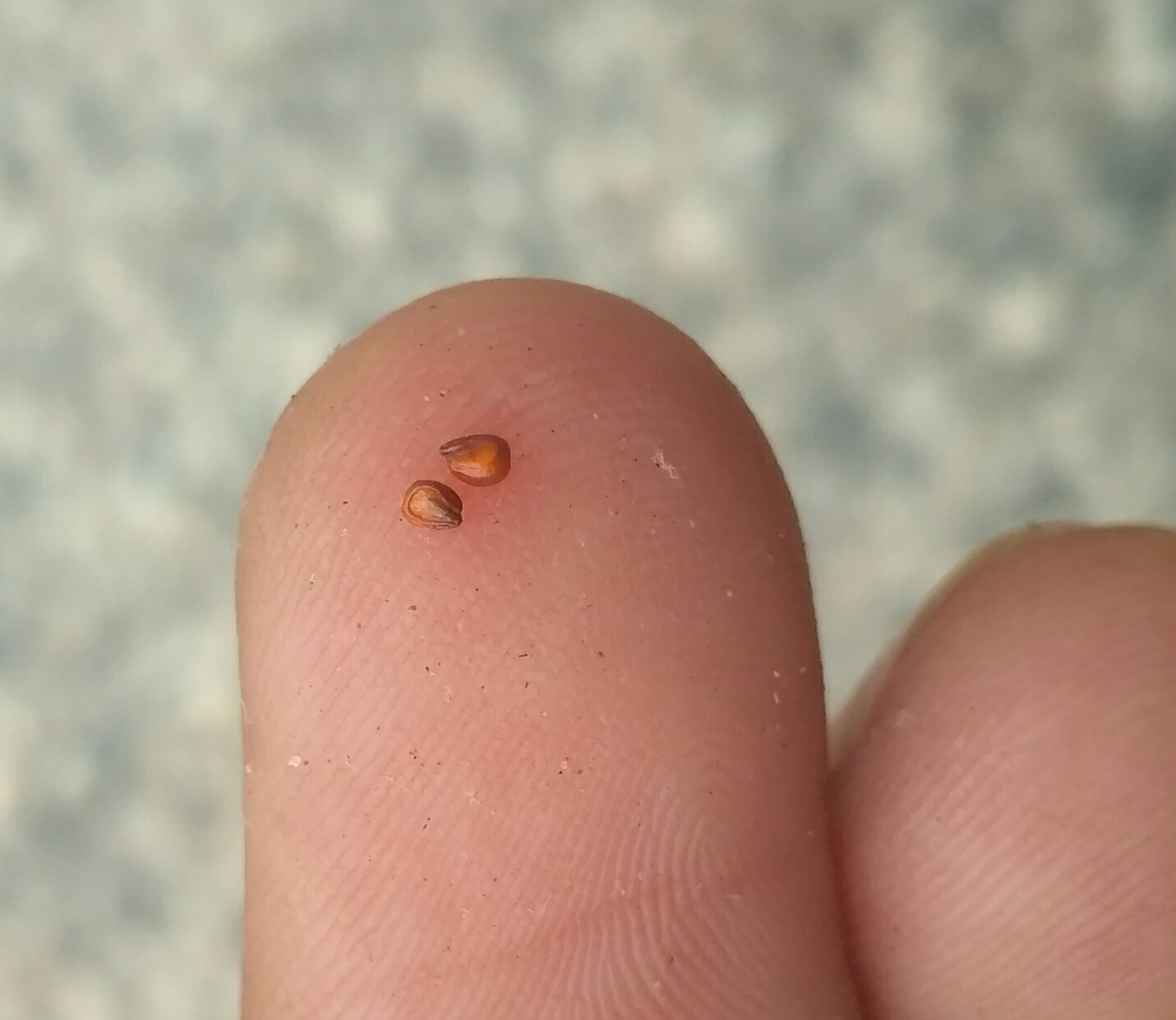
Seeds of Gomphrena globosa

Gomphrena globosa, commonly known as globe amaranth, is an edible plant from the family Amaranthaceae. The globular inflorescences are a visually dominant feature and cultivars have been propagated to exhibit shades of magenta, purple, red, orange, white, pink, and lilac. Within the flowerheads, the true flowers are small and inconspicuous.

Gomphrena globosa is native to Central America including regions Panama, and Guatemala, but is now grown globally. As a tropical annual plant, G. globosa blooms continuously throughout summer and early fall. It is very heat tolerant and fairly drought resistant, but grows best in full sun and regular moisture. The plant fixes carbon through the C_{4} pathway. At maturity, the flowerheads are approximately 4 centimetres (1.6 in) long and the plant grows up to 24 inches (61 cm) in height.

Gomphrena globosa is an outcrossing species that is pollinated by butterflies, bees, and other insects. Floral volatiles likely play a significant role in the reproductive success of the plant by promoting the attraction of pollinators.

== Uses ==
In Hawaii, it is commonly used in long-lasting leis since it retains its shape and color after drying.

In Nepal, the flower is known commonly as makhamali ful and is used to make a garland during Bhai Tika, last day of Tihar festival. The garland is hung around a brother's neck by his sister for protection, the long-lasting character of the flower symbolising (and believed to ensure) a long life for him. The flower was included in the gift sent to Britain by Jung Bahadur Rana in 1855. This flower is known as Rakta Mallika in Sanskrit.

This plant is common in landscape design and cutting gardens for its vivid colors and color retention.

The edible plant G. globosa has been used in herbal medicine.

The flowers of G. globosa are rich in betacyanins which have a wide range of applications as additives and supplements in the food industry, cosmetics, and livestock feed. Stable between pH 3 and 7, the betacyanins in globe amaranth are well suited to be used as natural food dye and have a red-violet color.

== Chemical properties ==
=== Phytochemicals ===
At least twenty-seven phytochemicals have been detected in G. globosa including six phenolic acid derivatives and fifteen specific flavonoids. The most abundant phenolic compounds present are flavonoids. A major phenol was found to be kaempferol 3-O-rutinoside based on chromatographic and mass spectrometry techniques. Gomphrenol derivatives also contribute to phenolic content. Other flavanols include quercetin, kaempferol, and isorhamnetin derivatives.

=== Betacyanins ===
The major betacyanins identified in globe amaranth are gomphrenin, isogomphrenin II, and isogomphrenin III. These compounds are stored in vacuoles in the plant.

=== Volatiles ===
Cultivars of G. globosa vary in the identity of floral volatiles but the volatile compounds of nonanal, decanal, geranyl acetone, and 4,8,12-tetradecatrienal, 5,9,13-trimethyl, were commonly detected by chromatography-mass spectrometry analysis. The cultivar ‘Fireworks’ has a high abundance of volatile esters such as geranyl propionate, geranyl isovalerate, benzyl isovalerate, and benzyl tiglate. The floral volatile emission of this cultivar of G. globosa was found to exhibit a diurnal pattern independent of light. Emission of floral volatiles can be regulated by phytohormone and defense signaling molecules. Experimentally, the ethylene inhibitor silver thiosulphate increased volatile emission of molecules derived from the terpenoid pathway. Defense signaling molecules can have temporal effects on floral volatile emission such as increased emission after four hours and reduced emission of volatiles after 24 hours in time studies analyzed with chromatography-mass spectrometry.

== Gallery ==
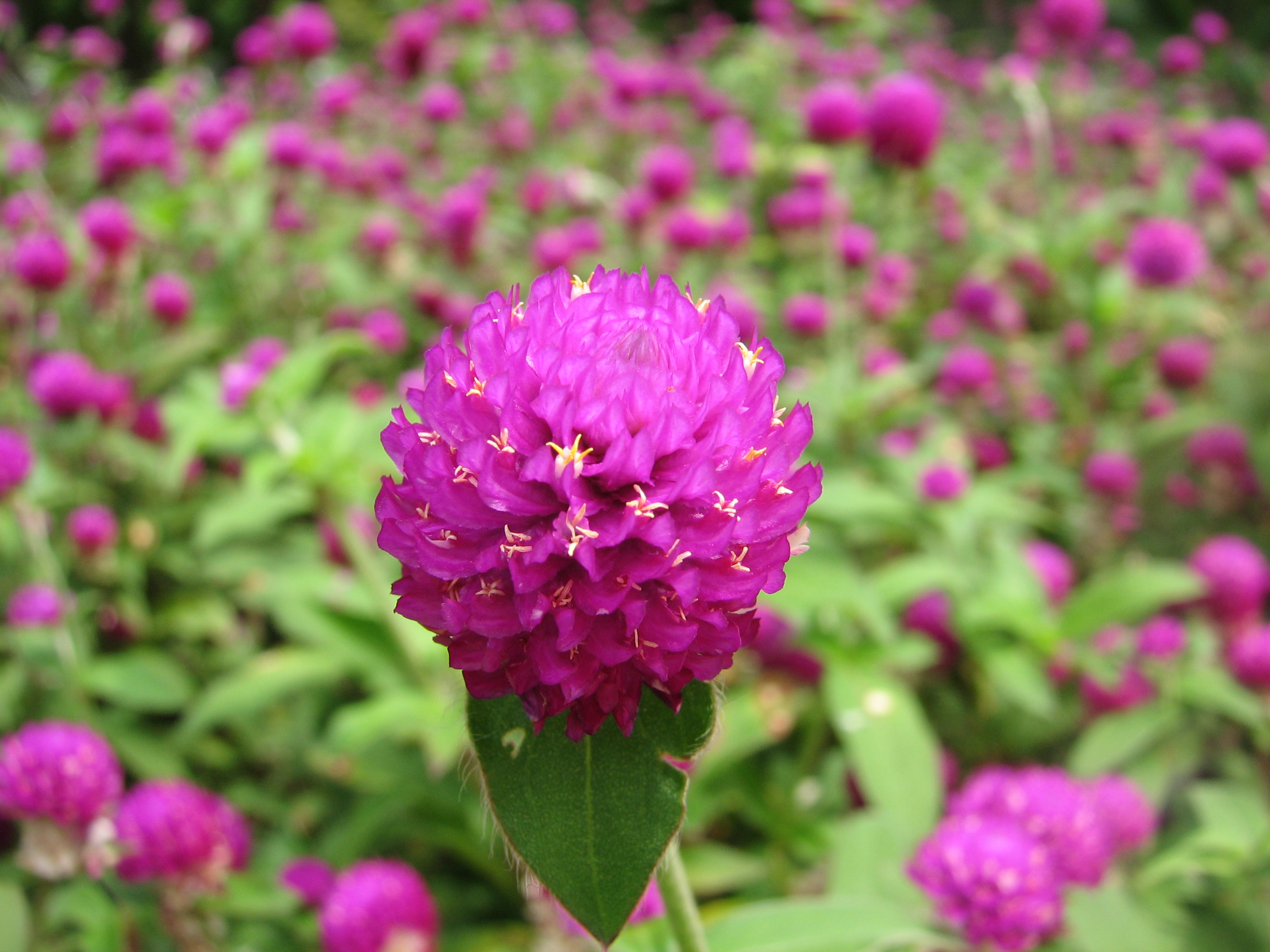

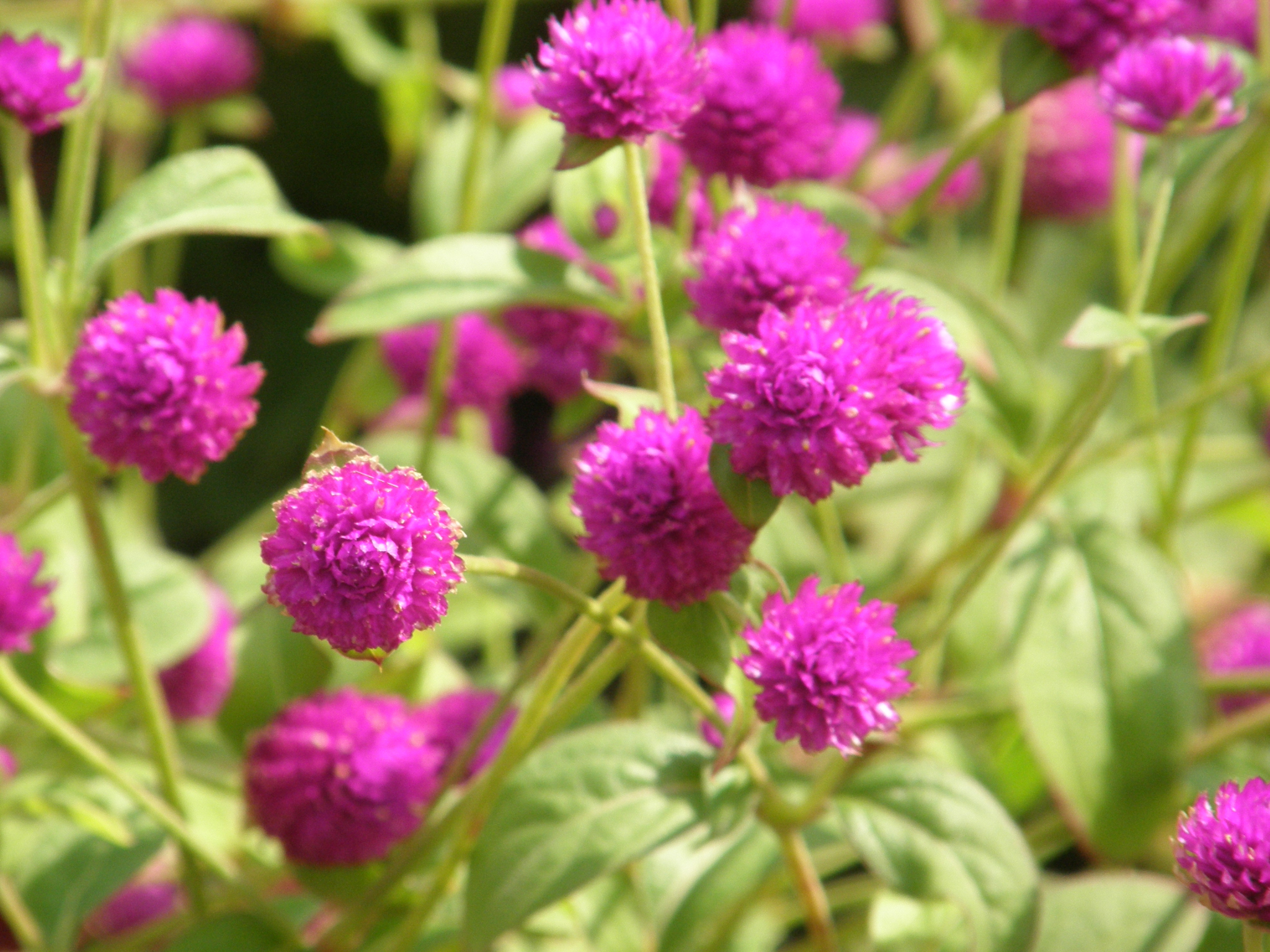

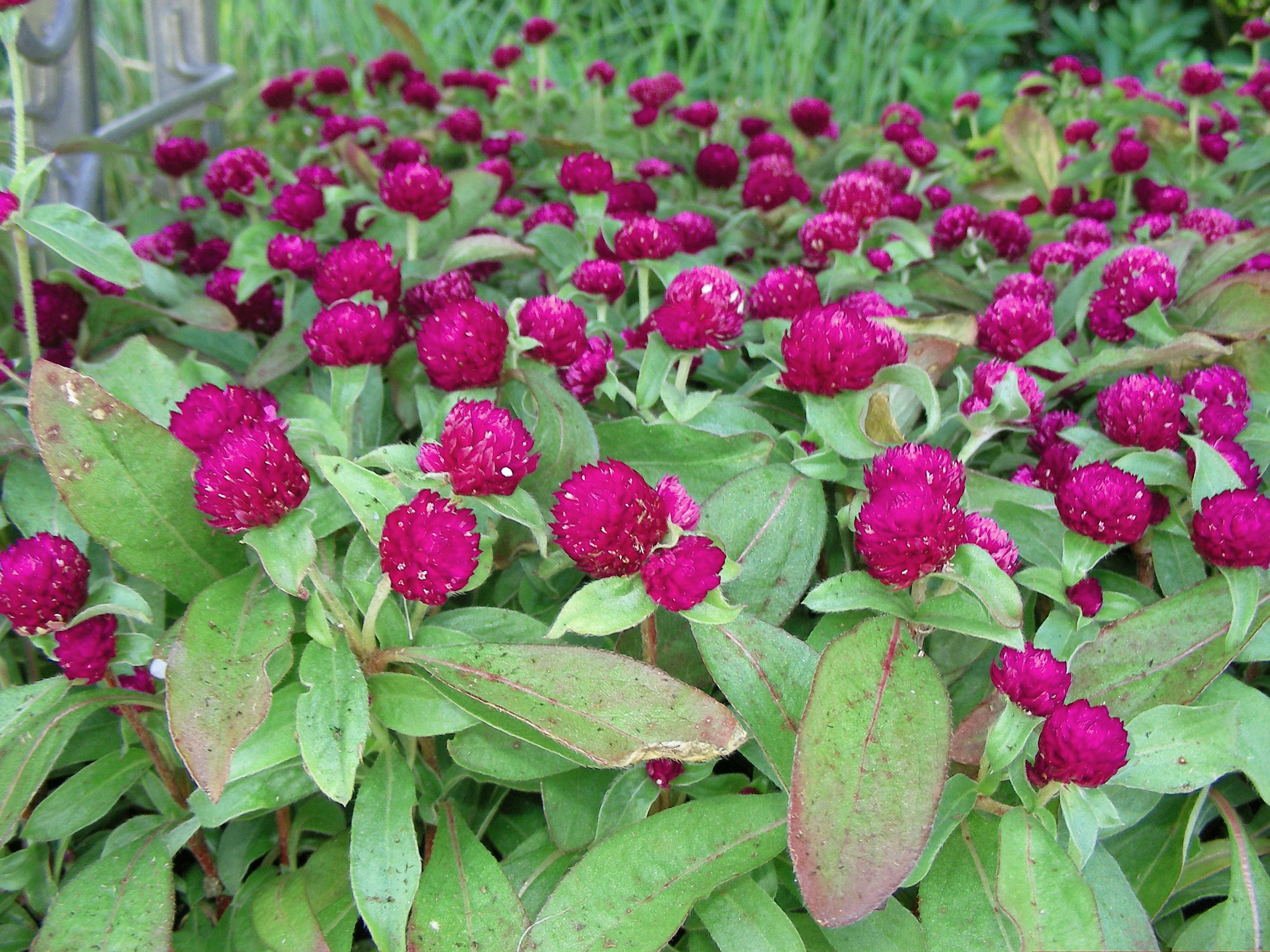

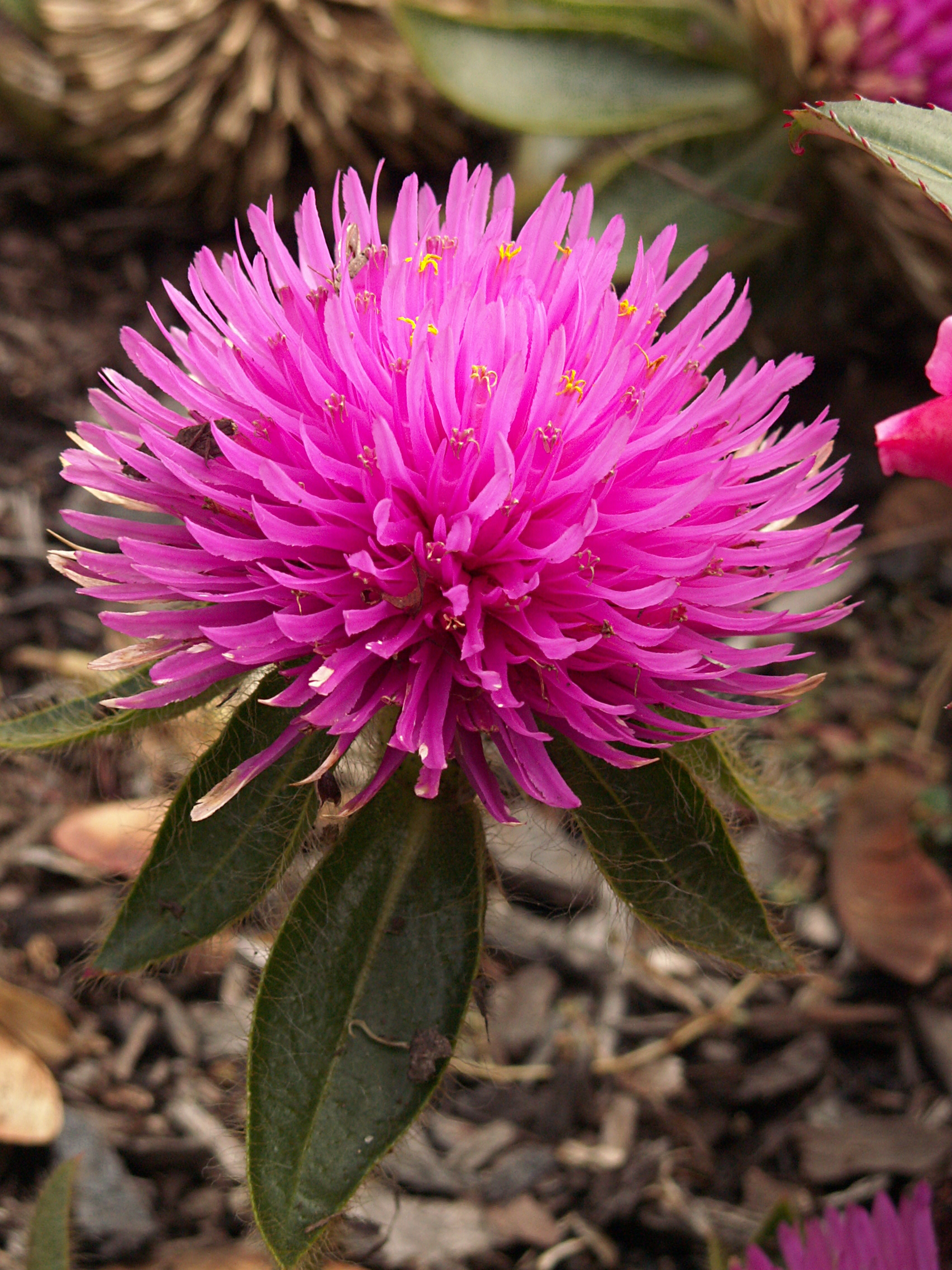

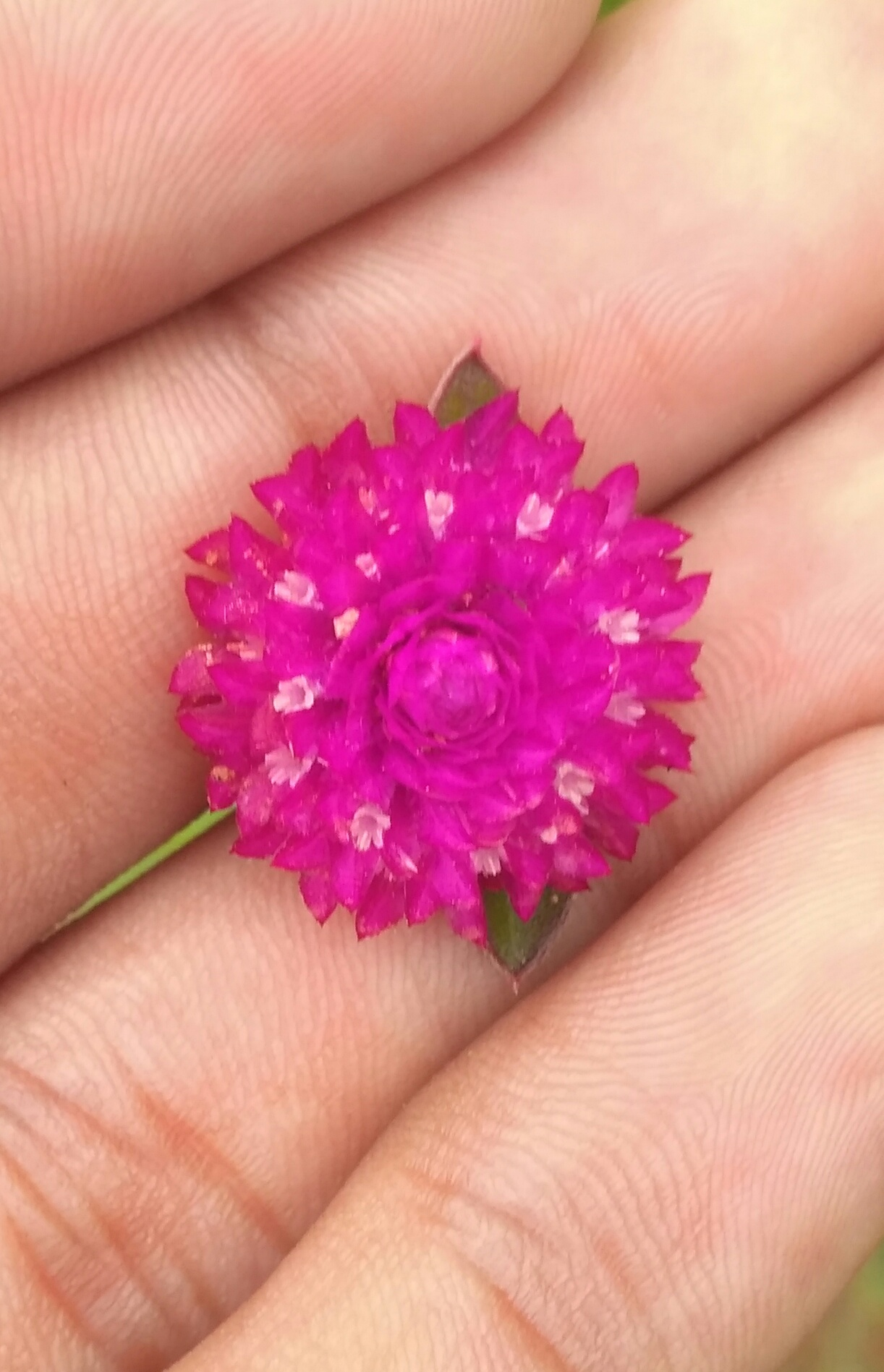
Flowerhead of G. globosa
