= Nirayana system =

Indian calendar system

The nirayana system is a traditional Indian system of calendrical computations in which the phenomenon of precession of equinoxes is not taken into consideration. In Indian astronomy, the precession of equinoxes is called ayana-calana which literally means shifting of the solstices and so nirayana is nir- + ayana meaning without ayana. Ayanacalana refers to the continuous backward movement of the point of intersection of the ecliptic (which is a fixed circle) and the celestial equator (which keeps on moving backward). In contrast, the Indian systems of calendrical computations which take into consideration the effects of precession of equinoxes are called sayana systems.

== Nirayana year ==
The nirayana year is the sidereal year, that is, is the actual time required for the Earth to revolve once around the Sun with respect to a fixed point on the ecliptic, and its duration is approximately 365.256363 days (365 days 6 hours 9 minutes 10 seconds). In the nirayana system, this fixed point is taken as that point 180° from the bright star Citrā (Spica). The starting point of the nirayana year coincided with the March equinox in the year 285 CE. Since the stars are fixed with respect to the ecliptic, the starting point remains unchanged, hence the name nirayana.

Duration of the nirayana months and year.^{a}
Month	per Ārya-Sinddhānta								per Sūrya-Siddhānta							
Month	days	gh	pa	vp	days	hr	min	sec	days	gh	pa	vp	days	hr	min	sec
vaiśākha
jyaiṣṭha
āṣāḍha
śrāvaṇa
bhādrapada
āśvina
kārttika
mārgaśīrṣa
pauṣa
māgha
phalguna
caitra
year
^aThe abbreviations gh, pa, and vp stand for ghaṭikā (24 minutes), pala (also called vighatikā, 24 seconds), and vipala (0.4 seconds).

=== Months ===
In the calendars that follow the nirayana system, a month is an artificial unit of time. In the nirayana system, the ecliptic is divided into 12 parts of 30° and each part is called a rāśi. The first rāśi starts from the same point as that of the start the nirayana year. The beginning of a nirayana month is the moment at which the Sun enter into a rāśi. The length of a nirayana month is the duration of time taken by the Sun to travel completely in a rāśi, that is, to travel 30° of its elliptical orbit. Since the speed at which the Sun is traversing its elliptical orbit around the sun is not constant, the durations of the sidereal months are also not constant. The mean length of a nirayana month is about 30.4369 days, but its actual length can vary from 29.45 days to 31.45 days. Calendar makers of different regions of India follow different computational systems, so, the duration of a nirayana month may vary from region to region.

Since the nirayana months are defined artificially, there are no astronomical phenomena associated with the beginning of a nirayana month. The exact moment at which a new nirayana month begins can occur at any time of day, early morning, evening or night. To facilitate dating of days, the first day of a month has to be properly defined in terms of saṃkrānti, the time at which the Sun enters a new rāśi. Unfortunately, there is no consensus among calendar-makers, and tradition varies from region to region. A few of these are:

- The Orissa rule: The month begins on the same day as the saṃkrānti.
- The Tamil rule: The month begins on the same day as the saṃkrānti if the saṃkrānti falls before sunset. Otherwise the month begins on the following day.
- The Kerala rule: The month begins on the same day as the saṃkrānti if the saṃkrānti occurs before aparahna. Otherwise the month starts on the following day. (Aparahna is the time at 3/5th duration of the period from sunrise to sunset. For example, if the times of sunrise and sunset are 6am and 6pm, the aparahna is [(3/5) x (18 – 6) + 6]am = 1.12pm.)
- The Bengal rule: When saṃkrānti takes place between sunrise and midnight on that day, the month begins on the following day. If it occurs between midnight and sunrise, the month begins on the third day. (In some special circumstances, there are some deviations from this rule.)

== Major deficiency ==
The most important deficiency of the nirayana calendar is that the predictions of the dates of the onsets of the various seasons as per the nirayana system do not correspond to the actual dates on which they occur. This is because the seasons depend on the position of the sun on the ecliptic relative to the celestial equator. In particular, they depend on the positions of the equinoxes. Since, the positions of the equinoxes are slowly moving, the predictions of the seasons which ignore this movement of the equinoxes will be definitely erroneous.

To be more specific, the winter season begins on the winter solstice day which date is marked by sun's entry into Makara constellation. This event occurs on 22 December. But in the nirayana system, this happens not on 22 December but on 14 January and the winter season is also supposed to begin on that date. Similar is the case with other seasons also. The result is that there is a clear difference of 23 days in the reckoning of seasons.
