= Nwagi festival =

Nwagi (Nepali: न्वागी), also spelled Nuwagi or Udhauli, is a major festival celebrated by the Kirati people (in the months of August and September).

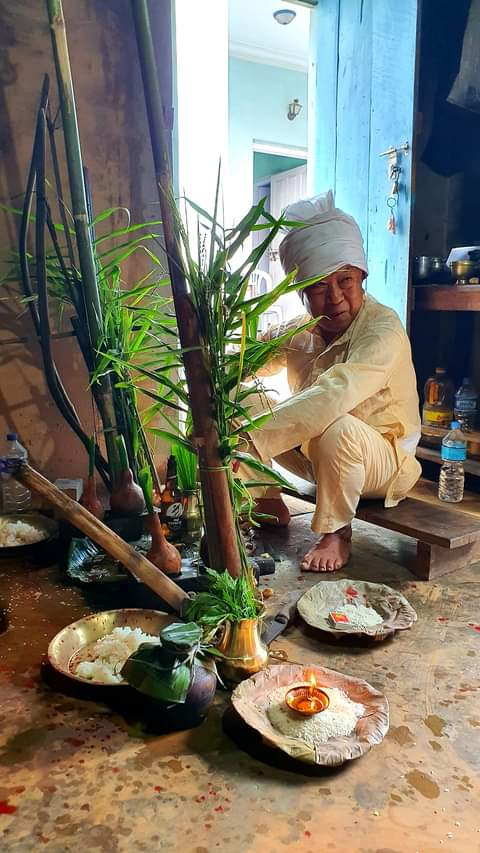
elder Kirati man performing Nuwagi ritual at house

Nwagi is celebrated prior to eating the harvested food crops, some of which are offered to ancestors and nature gods. Locals believe that anybody eating the crops without celebrating Nwagi would be cursed by their ancestors.

== Nuwagi cycle ==
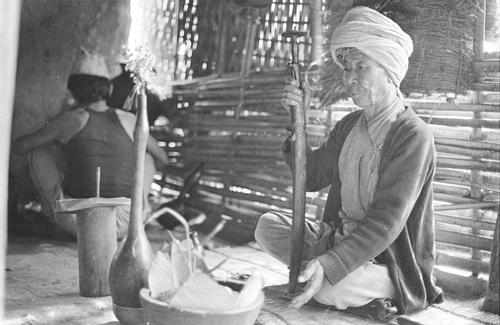
Kulung Rai priest performing Nagi/Dedam or Nuwagi ritual at house

The nuwāgi cycle celebrates the first fruits offering and is the most important ritual occasion during the harvest season in autumn, in the month of Kārtik (October/ November). The ancestors are presented with the new rice or millet, and only after they have eaten can the household consume the newly harvested grains. Thus it is a happy occasion: it is a time when the work of the year is about to be completed, the hard days of food scarcity (Nep. anikāl) are over and food is plentiful again. As a good harvest depends on the support of the ancestors, they have to be satisfied and given their share. As honoured guests, they are invited and given the best of foods before everybody else, and they are asked to remain benevolent and supportive. The nuwāgi is a half-day feast marked by a communal meal to which a good number of relatives and neighbours are invited.
