= Lakshmi Puja =

Deepavali occasion dedicated to the goddess Lakshmi

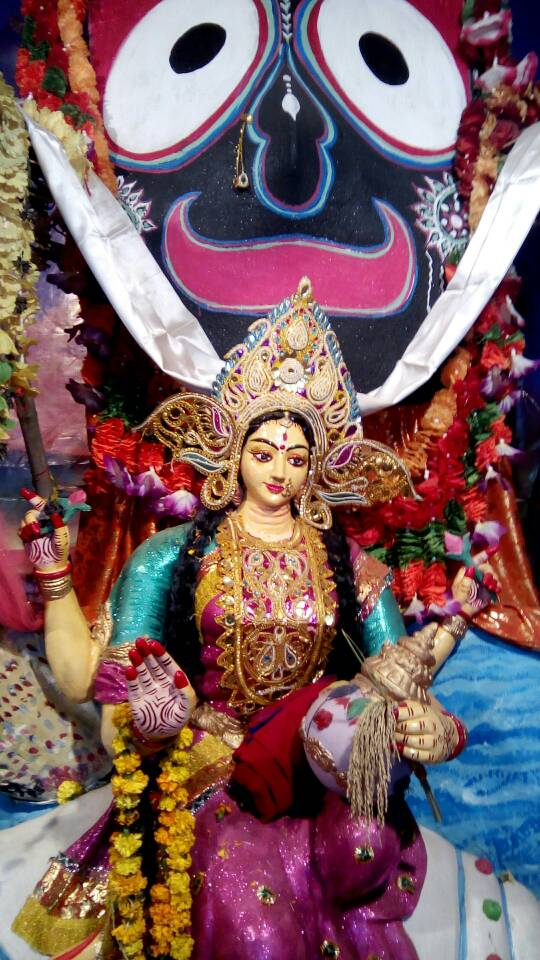
- Idol of the goddess during Lakshmi Puja
- Also called: Worship of Goddess Lakshmi
- Observed by: Hindus
- Type: Hindu
- Significance: honour Goddess Lakshmi to bring wealth and prosperity to the family in the future
- Celebrations: Worship of Goddess Lakshmi
- Date: Ashvin 30 (amanta tradition); Kartika 15 (purnimanta tradition)
- 2026 date: 8 November
- 2027 date: 29 October
- Frequency: Annual
- Related to: Deepavali and Tihar, Varalakshmi Vratam

Explanatory note on Hindu festival dates
- The Hindu calendar is lunisolar but most festival dates are specified using the lunar portion of the calendar. A lunar day is uniquely identified by three calendar elements: māsa (lunar month), pakṣa (lunar fortnight) and tithi (lunar day). Furthermore, when specifying the masa, one of two traditions are applicable, viz. amānta / pūrṇimānta. If a festival falls in the waning phase of the moon, these two traditions identify the same lunar day as falling in two different (but successive) masa. A lunar year is shorter than a solar year by about eleven days. As a result, most Hindu festivals occur on different days in successive years on the Gregorian calendar.

Lakshmi Puja (Sanskrit: लक्ष्मीपूजा, romanized: Lakṣmīpūjā) is a Hindu occasion for the veneration of Lakshmi, the goddess of prosperity and the Supreme Goddess of Vaishnavism. The occasion is celebrated on the amavasya (new moon day) in the Vikram Samvat Hindu calendar month of Ashvin (according to the amanta tradition) or Kartika (according to the purnimanta tradition), on the third day of Deepavali (Tihar) in Nepal and most parts of India.

Seat of Lakshmi Puja at household.

According to tradition, Lakshmi is believed to visit her devotees and bestow good fortune and her blessings upon them on this occasion. To welcome the goddess, devotees clean their houses, decorate them with finery and lights, and prepare sweet treats and delicacies as offerings. Devotees believe that the happier the goddess is during her visit, the more she blesses the family with health and wealth.

In Assam, Odisha, and Bengal, the occasion is performed on Ashvin Purnima day on the month of Ashvin, the full moon day following Vijaya Dashami and Durga Puja. This puja is also known as Kojagori Lokkhi Pujo. Women worship the goddess in the evening after cleaning their houses and decorating their floors with jhunti, alpana, or rangoli. The puja is celebrated in the evening, with all family members participating in cleaning and decorating their homes as part of the puja.

== Celebrations ==
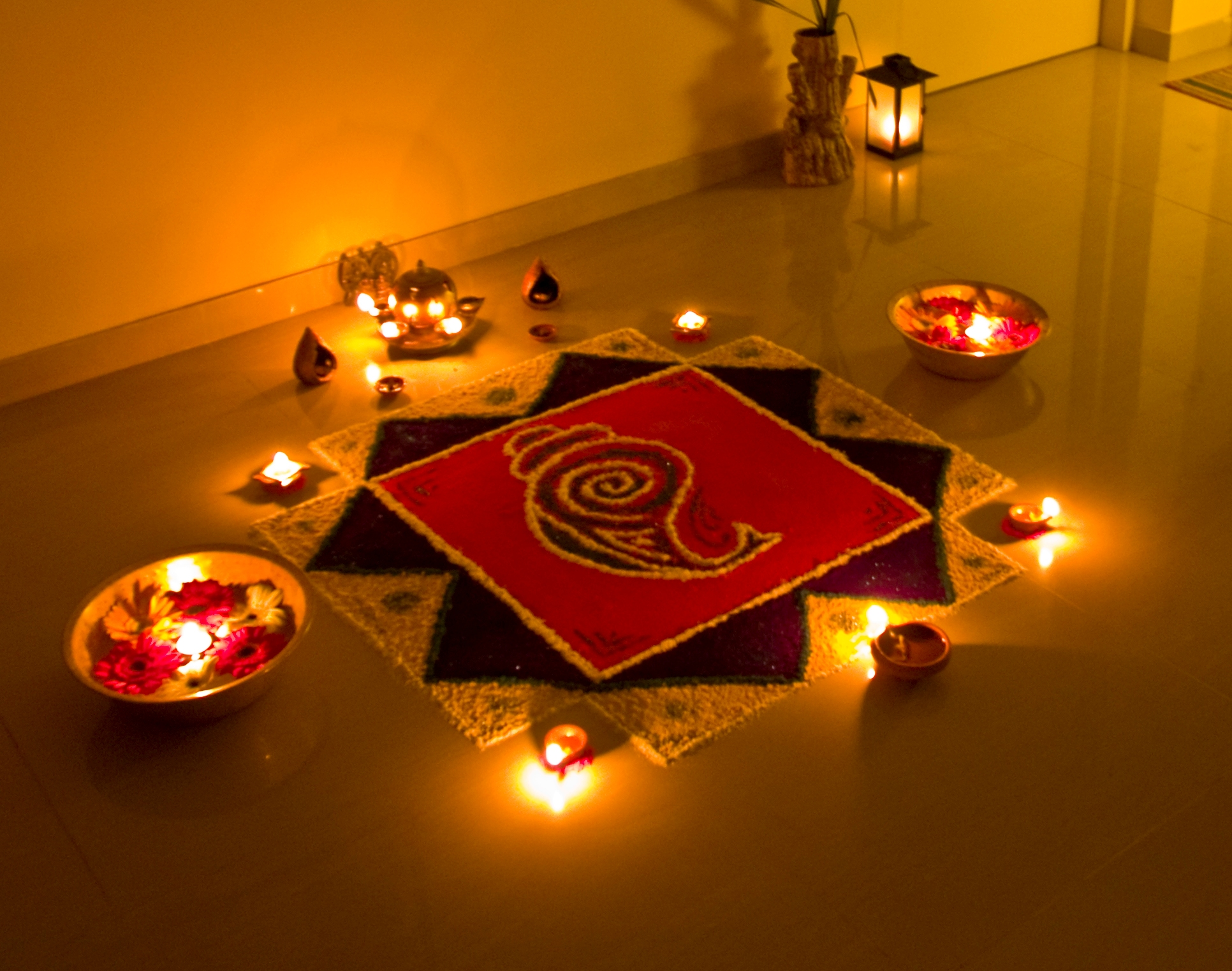
Rangoli of Lights

=== India ===
Lakshmi is believed to roam the earth on the night of the Lakshmi Puja. She searches for households where she will be welcomed, in which she will enter and spread prosperity and good fortune. On the evening of Lakshmi Puja, people open their doors and windows to welcome Lakshmi, and place diya lights on their windowsills and balcony ledges to invite her in. During the days leading up to Diwali, people will clean, repair and decorate their homes to make them suitable for welcoming the goddess.

People wear new clothes or their best outfits as the evening approaches. Then, the diyas are lit, pujas are offered to Lakshmi, and to one or more additional deities depending on the region of India; typically Ganesha, Saraswati, or Kubera. As Lakshmi symbolises wealth and prosperity, her blessings are invoked for a good year ahead.

On this day, the mothers, who work hard all year, are praised by the family. Mothers are seen to embody a part of Lakshmi, the good fortune and prosperity of the household. Small earthenware lamps filled with oil are lighted and placed in rows by some Hindus along the parapets of temples and houses. Some set diyas adrift on rivers and streams. Important relationships and friendships are also recognised during the day, by visiting relatives and friends, exchanging gifts and sweets.

It is popularly believed that Lakshmi likes cleanliness, and visits the cleanest house first. Hence, offerings of haldi (turmeric) and sindoor (vermilion) are made on this day. In certain regions, Lakshmi Puja consists of a combined puja of five deities: Ganesha is worshipped at the beginning of every auspicious act as Vighneshvara; the goddess Lakshmi is worshipped in her three forms: Mahalakshmi, the goddess of wealth and prosperity, Mahasaraswati, the goddess of knowledge and learning, and Mahakali. Kubera the treasurer of the gods is also worshipped.

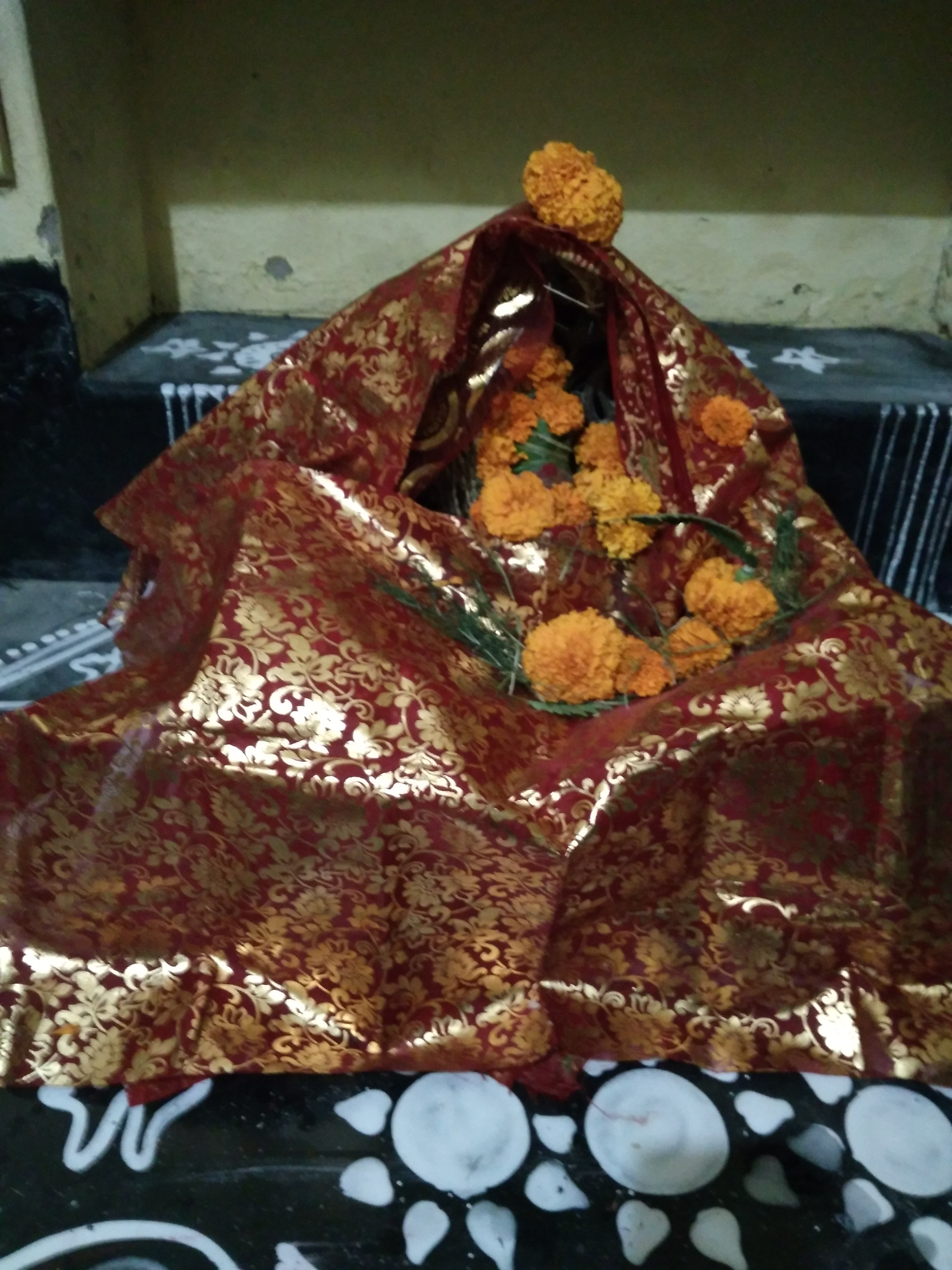
Lakshmi Puja in home

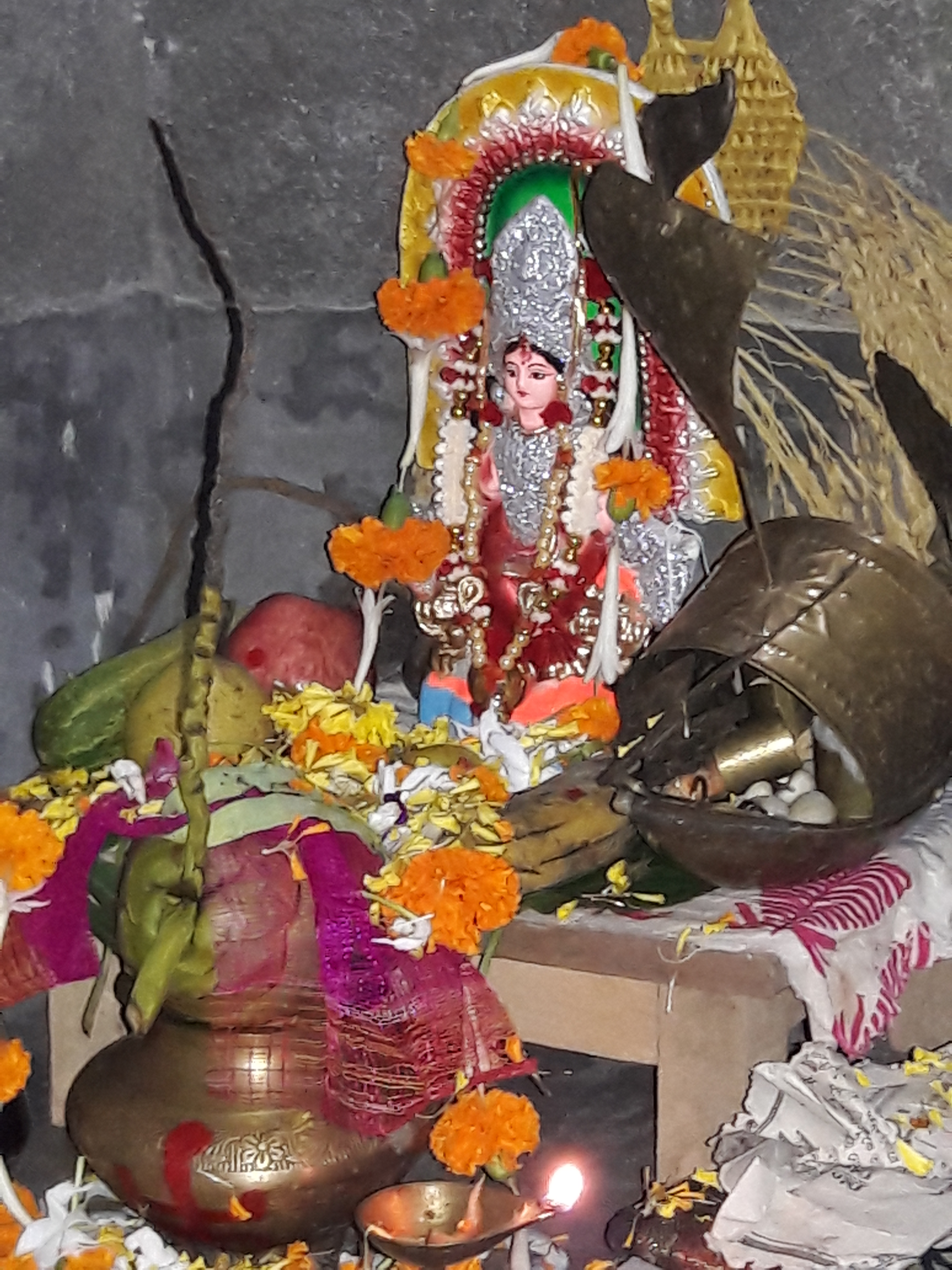
The clay model of goddess Lakshmi accompanied by her consort Vishnu and a boat (on the left side of the image) consisting five drums having grains, gold, silver, cotton and cowrie shells in Bengal

In Bengal, the goddess Lakshmi is worshipped five days after Vijaya Dashami on the full moon day of Sharada. This is known as Kojagori Lokkhi Pujo in Bengali. On this day generally, the goddess is worshipped at night. She is also worshipped in the form of banana trees, designed clay cover of utensils, accompanied by a small boat containing five drums. She is also worshipped on the eve of Deepavali which is commonly known as Dipanwita Lokkhi puja or Alakshmi Viday (The departure of Alakshmi). The goddess is also worshipped in the month of Bhadra (August–September) on Thursdays. She is worshipped as rice put into a utensil which is changed annually. This worship is also practiced in the month of Poush (December–January).

In Odisha, Lakshmi Puja is an 11-day celebration where Lakshmi is worshiped in the form of Gajalakshmi. Gajalakshmi Puja traces its origin to Kumar Purnima which is also observed on this day – the last day of Ashvin month, marking the beginning of Kartika as per the Odia calendar. Kumar Purnima is mostly dedicated to all unmarried girls.

In Assam, Lakshmi/Lakkhi puja is celebrated five days after Vijoya Doshomi. Family members participates in decorating home entrances to welcome Lakshmi. The prasad usually includes sweets, moong/gram, and fruits.

In South India, Lakshmi puja is performed on Varalakshmi Vratam, Navaratri and Diwali.

=== Nepal ===
Lakshmi Puja is celebrated as a part of Tihar, a second national festival of Nepal after Dashain and followed by Chhath. In Nepal, it is celebrated for five days, which include Kag (crow) Tihar; Kukur (dog) Tihar; Gai (cow) Tihar in the morning and Lakshmi Puja at night; Maha puja (self puja); Goru (Ox and Bull) Tihar and Gobardhan puja; and finally, Bhai Tika (Bhai dhooj)—respectively the first, second, third, fourth and fifth days.

On Lakshmi Puja in Nepal, people buy gold and silver, precious gemstones, new utensils of copper, brass and bronze as a sign of good luck, prosperity, money and wealth. These are then used to worship Lakshmi at night. Nepalese people perform this worship at a place cleansed with holy water, cow dung and red mud; they light the whole house with candles and lamps. From Lakshmi Puja, Deusi/Bhailo is performed by gathering with friends.

== Puja ==
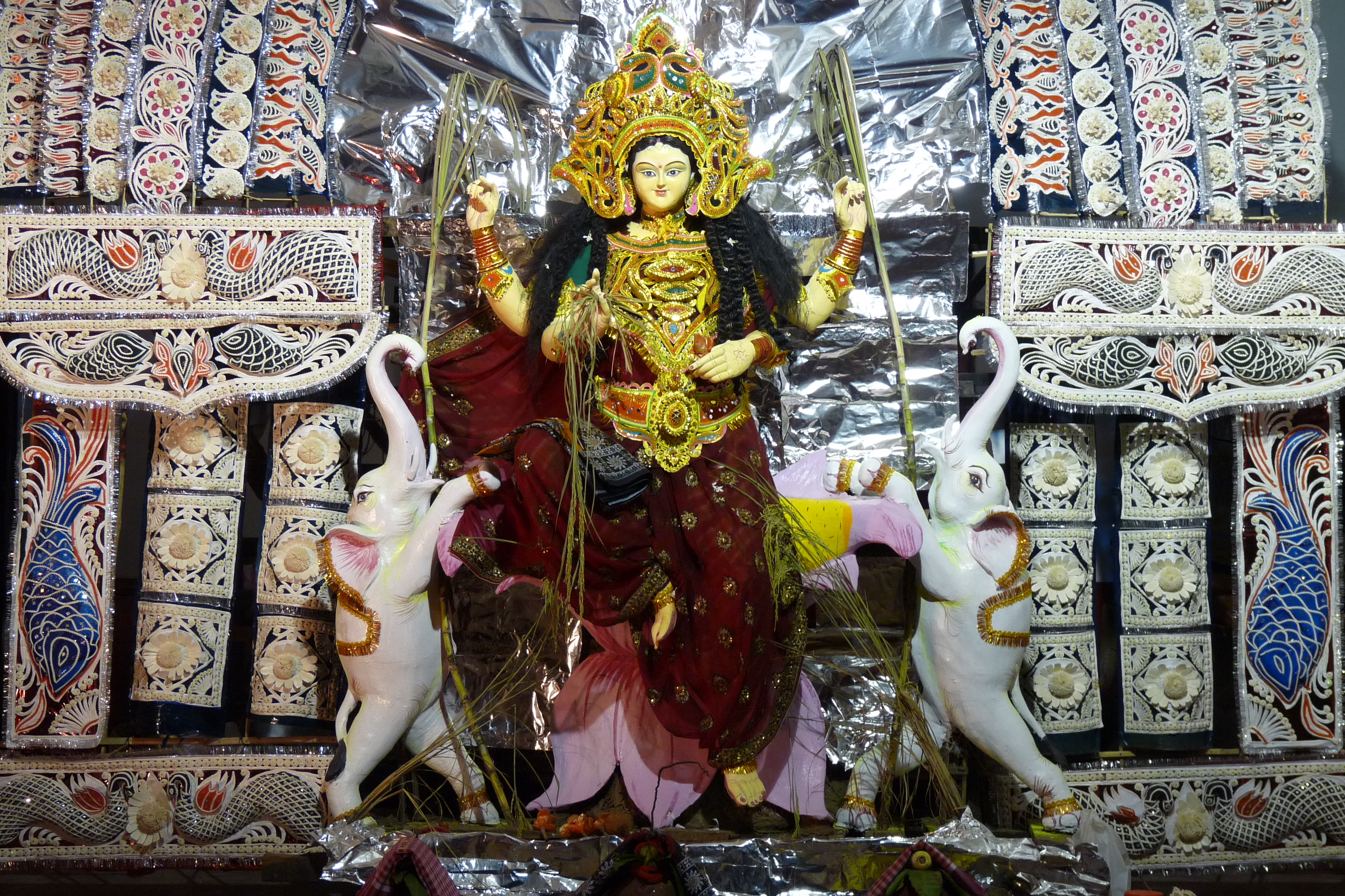
Lakshmi Puja, Bhubaneshwar

In the beginning of the puja, the houses of devotees are cleaned, and rangoli is drawn at the doorstep to welcome the goddess Lakshmi. While there is no consensus of the standardised ritual to pray to the goddess, variations of the puja exist across the regions of the Indian subcontinent as well as Southeast Asia. However a central component in almost all forms of puja is the process of darshan, a form of devotion via the exchange of affectionate glances between an image of the deity and a devotee, initiating a relationship between the two. Other integral parts of puja come in the form of offerings given to the deity by the devotee, sanctifying the food (prasad) by divine contact, for the devotee to then distribute and consume.

=== Procedure ===
Before beginning the puja, Hindus consider it important to cleanse and purify the space where the puja is being carried out. For this, benzoin is lighted using either coal, or dried pancakes made of cow-dung. Its fumes of incense are considered to purify the atmosphere.

Once the place is cleansed, the puja begins by laying down a piece of new cloth on a raised platform. Handfuls of grains are sprayed in the centre of the cloth and a kalasha made of gold, silver, or copper is placed on top. Three-quarters of the kalasha is filled with water and betel nut, a flower, a coin, and a few rice grains are added to it. Five kinds of leaves are arranged (if a specified species is not available, leaves from a mango tree are used) and a small dish filled with rice grains is placed on the kalasha. A lotus is drawn over the rice grains with turmeric powder and the idol of goddess Lakshmi is placed over the top of the kalasha, and coins are placed around it.

An idol of Ganesha is placed in front of the kalasha, on the right-hand side pointing towards the south-west. Ink and business account books of the worshippers are kept on the platform. Specially blended oils made for puja are used with its ingredients varying, depending on the deity it's being offered to. A panchamukhi diya (five-faced lamp) accommodating five wicks are lit for this purpose. A special lamp is then lit in front of Ganesha.

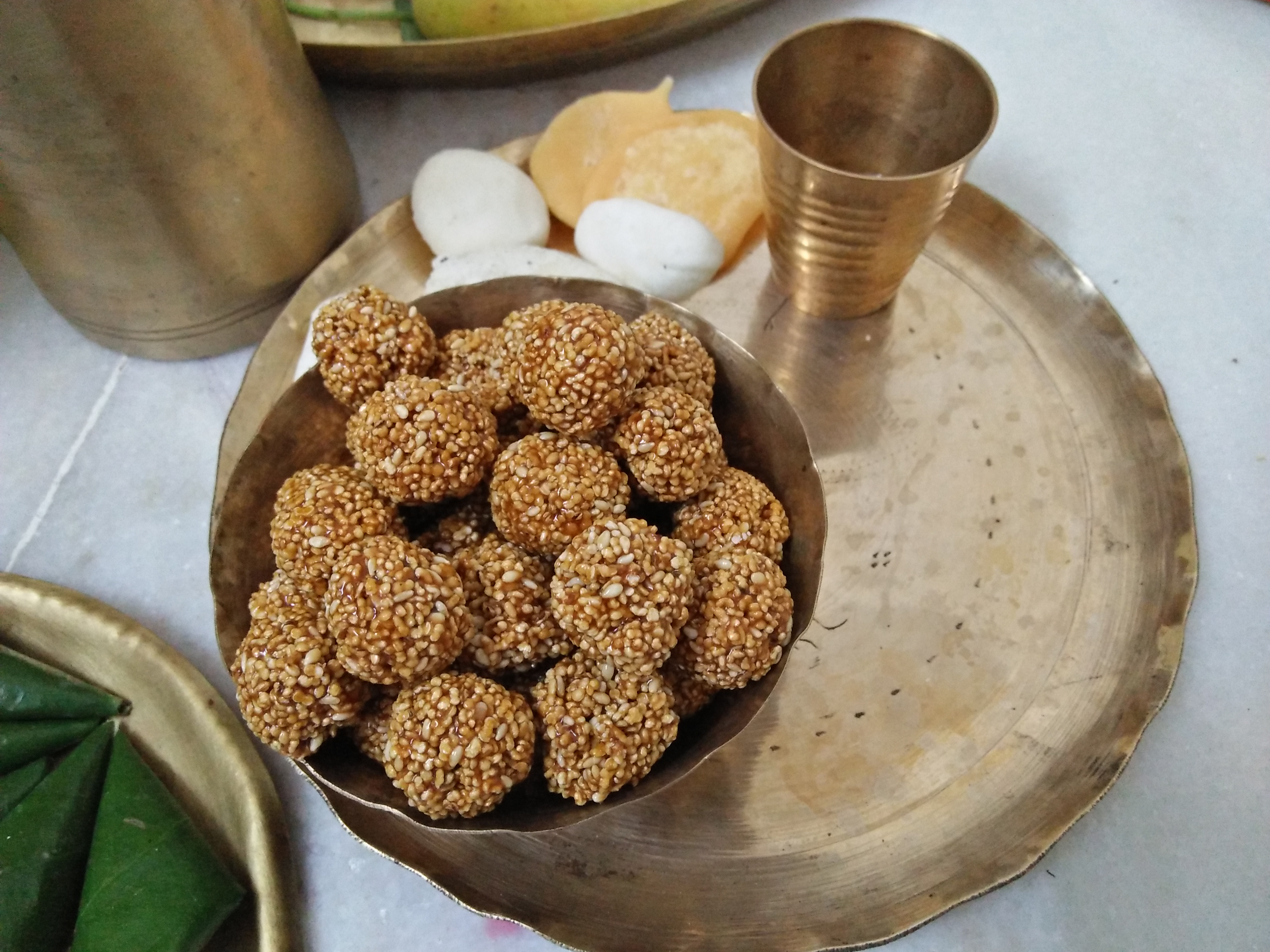
Tiler naru offered to goddess Lakshmi during the puja at a household in West Bengal, India

The puja begins by offering turmeric, kumkuma and flowers to the goddess Lakshmi. Turmeric, kumkuma, and flowers are offered to the water, later used for the puja. The river goddess Saraswati is invoked to become part of that water. Lakshmi is worshipped and invoked by reciting Vedic mantras, hymns and prayers addressed to her. Her idol is placed in a plate and is bathed with panchamrita (a mixture of milk, curd, ghee or clarified butter, honey, and sugar) and then with water containing a gold ornament or a pearl. Her idol is cleaned and placed back on the kalasha. A special lamp is then lit in front of Lakshmi.

Offerings of sandal paste, saffron paste, garland of cotton beads or flowers, ittar (perfume), turmeric, kumkuma, abir, and gulal are then made to the goddess Lakshmi. Flowers and garlands, such as lotus, marigold, rose, chrysanthemums and leaves of bael (wood apple tree) are also offered. An incense stick is lit for her. An offering of sweets, coconut, fruits, and tambulam, is made later. Puffed rice and batasha (varieties of Indian sweets) are placed near the idol. Puffed rice, batasha, coriander seeds, and cumin seeds are poured or offered to her idol.

In the villages, a pot made of bamboo-canes measuring the paddy known as Nana is filled up to the brink with freshly harvest paddy. Rice and lentils are also kept with the paddy. The mana is the symbol of Mahalakshmi. Adoration of the goddess is done by offering fruits, coconut, banana, doob-grass, amla, curd, turmeric, flowers, incense etc. It is customary to read out the Odia text Lakshmi Purana while performing the puja.

A swastika symbol is also then drawn on the safe or vault in which the devotee keeps their valuables and it is worshipped as a symbol of Kubera.

Towards the end of the ritual, the aarti is performed which is dedicated to Lakshmi. The aarti is accompanied by a small bell and is performed in a silent and sublime atmosphere.
