= Ghanta Karna =

Nepalese Newari festival

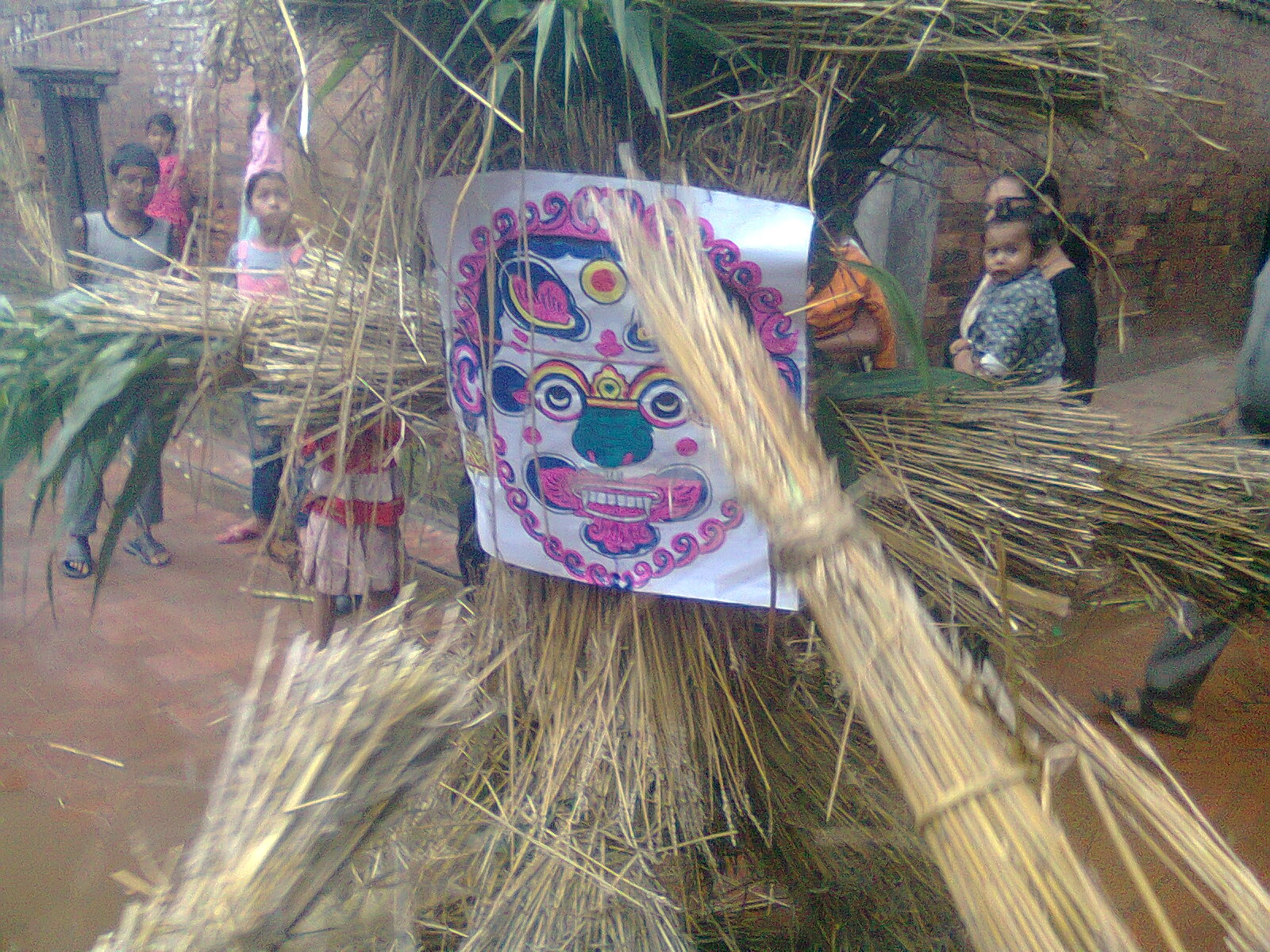
- Effigy of the demon
- Official name: Gathe Mangal
- Observed by: Newar people
- Type: Religious
- Significance: Defeat of the demon Ghanta Karna
- Frequency: Annual

Ghanta Karna (also known as Ghanta Karna Chaturdasi and Gathe Mangal) is a Nepalese Newari festival celebrating the defeat of the mythical demon Ghanta Karna ("bell-ears") or "Gatha-Mungal" in the local Newari language. According to the myth, the demon wore bell earrings in order to drown out the name of the god Shiva with their jingling. Attributed to him are acts of robbery, murder, and the kidnapping of children. The festival takes place during the month of Shrawan (July/August).

== Sources ==
- Festivals in Nepal
