= Pancha Dan =

Pancha Dan is the festival of five summer gifts. The five different things including rice grains, unhusked rice grains, salt, money and pulses that are needed for one's daily life are donated. These days, as per one's will and capacity, people donate other things besides that. This festival falls on triodashi, two days prior to the Father's Day (Buwa ko mukh herne din) according to the lunar calendar.

This is a Buddhist festival in which gifts are made by the laity to the monks observed by Buddhists of Kathmandu, Lalitpur, Bhaktapur, Panauti and Banepa only, especially by Shakyas and Bajracharyas. Buddhist antiques are displayed and gigantic effigies of Dīpankara Buddha are paraded around the town. Since monastic Buddhism has been long extinct in Nepal, the receivers of the gift today are the Buddhist priests, the Shakyas and the Vajracharyas, who go collecting alms to the homes of their clients. However, the main highlight of the festival is the giving away of five elements (wheat grains, rice grains, salt, money and fruit).Traditional collections of artifacts are displayed in monasteries and households on this occasion.
