= Tihar (festival) =

Nepalese festival of lights and flowers

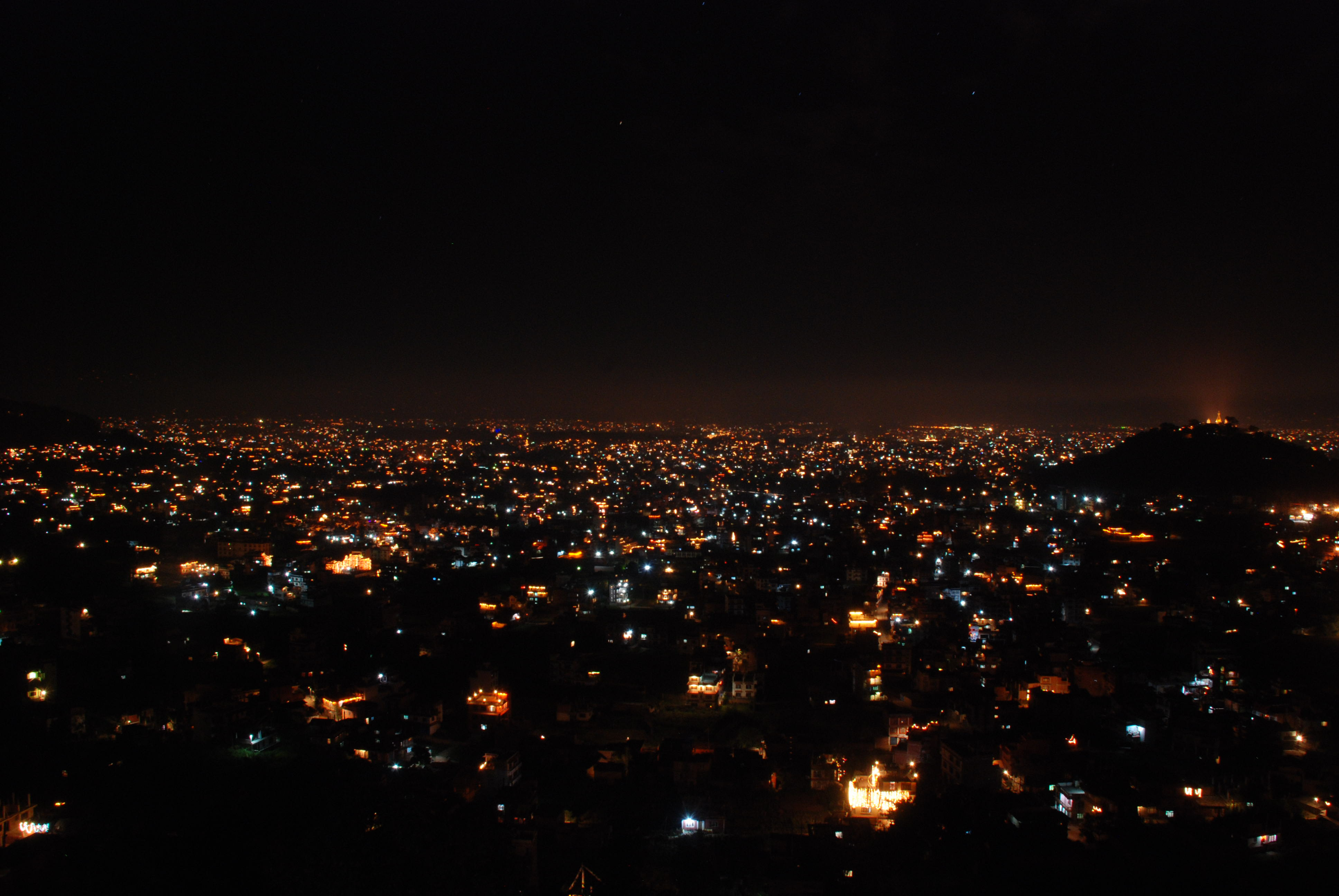
- Night view of Kathmandu during the festival (2009)
- Official name: Tihar
- Also called: Yamapanchak
- Observed by: Nepal, and regions with large Nepalese populations
- Type: Religious, cultural
- Significance: Honors Lakshmi; Honors Yama; Honors Crows; Honors Dogs; Honors Cows; Honors Oxen; Honors the bond between siblings
- Celebrations: Diyo lighting; Worshipping; Family/Social gatherings; Deusi/Bhailo; Feasting; Offering sweets; House decoration; Rangoli; Gift-giving; Colorful flowers; Fireworks
- Observances: Prayers and religious rituals
- Begins: Kartika (month); Krishna Paksha (waning moon); Trayodashi (thirteenth day)
- Ends: Kartika (month); Shukla Paksha (waxing moon); Dvitiya (second day)
- 2026 date: 7 November (begins); 11 November (ends)
- Duration: 5 days
- Frequency: Annual

Explanatory note on Hindu festival dates
- The Hindu calendar is lunisolar but most festival dates are specified using the lunar portion of the calendar. A lunar day is uniquely identified by three calendar elements: māsa (lunar month), pakṣa (lunar fortnight) and tithi (lunar day). Furthermore, when specifying the masa, one of two traditions are applicable, viz. amānta / pūrṇimānta. If a festival falls in the waning phase of the moon, these two traditions identify the same lunar day as falling in two different (but successive) masa. A lunar year is shorter than a solar year by about eleven days. As a result, most Hindu festivals occur on different days in successive years on the Gregorian calendar.

Tihar (Nepali: तिहार), also known as Yamapanchak (lit. 'Five Days of Yama') or Festival of Lights and Flowers, is one of the most significant Hindu festivals celebrated annually in Nepal according to the Bikram Sambat calendar. It is celebrated by Nepalese of all religions and border diaspora, as well as in regions where Nepalese population is in large number and Nepali cultural influence is prominent.

The festival lasts for five days, with each day dedicated to different animals and deities. According to the Bikram Sambat calendar, it begins with Kaag Tihar (on the thirteenth day of the krishna paksha in the month of Kartika) and ends with Bhai Tika (on the second day of the shukla paksha in the month of Kartika as well). In the Gregorian calendar, Tihar typically falls between October and November each year.

Tihar is marked by lighting Diyo (lamps) both inside and outside homes. The five-day includes the worship of the four animals: crow, dog, cow, and ox, associated with Yama, the god of death and justice, as well as Lakshmi, a major Hindu goddess of wealth and prosperity in Hinduism, with the final day dedicated to the bond between people, especially siblings, known as Bhai Tika.

== Etymology ==
The term Tihar is believed to have been derived from the Sanskrit compound tithivāra, which is formed by combining tithi (meaning a lunar day in the Bikram Sambat calendar) and vāra (meaning day or occasion). Over centuries of phonetic evolution across Indo-Aryan languages, tithivāra developed into standard regional forms such as tyohār (meaning festival) and was systematically adopted into the Nepali language as tihar. The name fundamentally denotes a major festival observed across a specific succession of sacred lunar days.

While Tihar is the universally used, common, and primarily name for the festival in the Nepali language, Yamapanchak (यमपञ्चक) serves as an alternative name that functions as its classical, scriptural, and liturgical designation. This term is a compound of the Sanskrit deity name Yama (the god of death and righteousness) and pañcaka (meaning a group of five or quintet). Translating literally to the "Five Days of Yama."

== Celebrations ==
People make patterns on the floors of living rooms or courtyards using materials such as coloured rice, dry flour, coloured sand or flower petals, called Rangoli, as a sacred welcoming for the gods and goddesses, particularly Lakshmi. For five days, people decorate their homes, and light diyo, candles, electric string lights around the house in the evenings. As Lakshmi puja falls on the new moon night, which is the darkest night of the lunar month, people light those diyo, candles. etc. to remove the darkness and bring the light to home to welcome the goddess Lakshmi.

Firecrackers are often set off during the festival, although the Nepal government has placed a ban on the use of firecrackers in recent years citing increasing cases of injury.

Children also go from house to house to play Deusi/Bhailo (singing songs and asking for gifts in the form of money and foodstuff.)

Gambling in the form of cards, kauda (a game of cowrie shells), or langur burja are popular pastimes during the festival.

Tihar is the second biggest Nepali festival after Dashain, and is usually allocated a three-day-long national holiday. The festival is considered novel in that it shows reverence to not just the gods, but also to animals such as crows, cows, and dogs that have long-lived alongside humans.

== Day 1 ==
=== Kaag Tihar (काग तिहार) ===
The first day of Tihar is called Kaag Tihar. Crows and ravens are believed to be the messengers of Yama, the god of death and justice, and are worshipped with offerings of grains, seeds, and sweets placed on the roofs or out on the streets. The cawing of crows and ravens is associated with sadness and grief in Hinduism as these birds are believed to carry messages from Yama. By feeding the crows, devotees hope to appease them and ward off death and grief for the coming year.

Alongside Kaag Tihar, Dhanteras (also known as Dhan Trayodashi and Dhanwantari Jayanti) is also observed on this day. Dhanvantari, the Hindu god of medicine is revered on this day. There is also a tradition of people buying jewellery, utensils and home appliances on this day. It is considered auspicious to buy gold or silver on this day.

== Day 2 ==
=== Kukur Tihar (कुकुर तिहार) ===
Worship a dog

The second day of Tihar is called Kukur Tihar, during which dogs are worshipped. On this day, all dogs (both pets and strays) are offered food, given tika on their foreheads, and adorned with marigold garlands around their necks. The day celebrates the deep bond between humans and dogs, recognizing their loyalty and companionship.

In Hinduism, this tradition is also reflected in the Mahabharata, where Yudhishthira refuses to enter the gates of Svarga (heaven) without his faithful dog, who is later revealed to be the god Yama. Thus, this ancient story symbolizes the bond between humans and dogs.

As mentioned in the Mahabharata, Bhairava, a fierce manifestation of Shiva, is often depicted with a dog as his vahana (mount). Yama, the god of death and justice, is also said to have two guard dogs, each with four eyes, who watch over the gates of Naraka (hell).

Due to this associations, this day is also observed as Naraka Chaturdashi.

Kukur Tihar has since gained widespread popularity on the internet, and in 2016 it was even adopted by a Mexican animal rights group for a similar celebration in Mexico City.

== Day 3 ==
=== Gai Tihar (गाई तिहार) ===
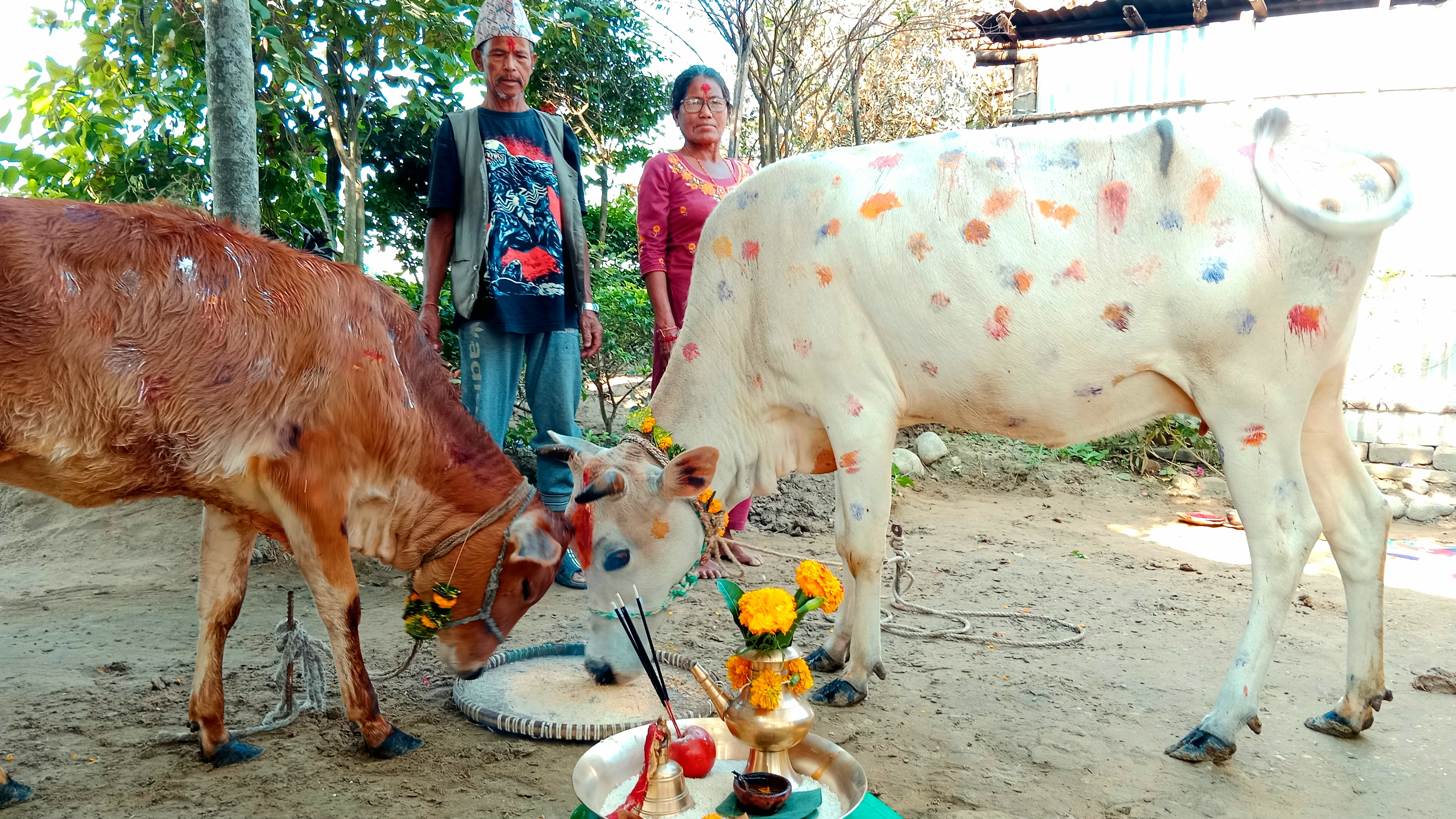
A couple worships a cow

The morning of the third day of Tihar is called Gai Tihar. The cow holds a sacred and highly respected place in Hinduism. It is revered as a gentle and giving animal that provides more than it takes. The cow produces milk, from which products such as cheese and gheu are made, as well as dung and urine, which are traditionally used in various cultural and agricultural practices. Thus, on the third day of Tihar, Hindu people show their gratitude to the cow by feeding them treats and worshipping them with tika and garlands.

=== Lakshmi Puja (लक्ष्मी पूजा) ===
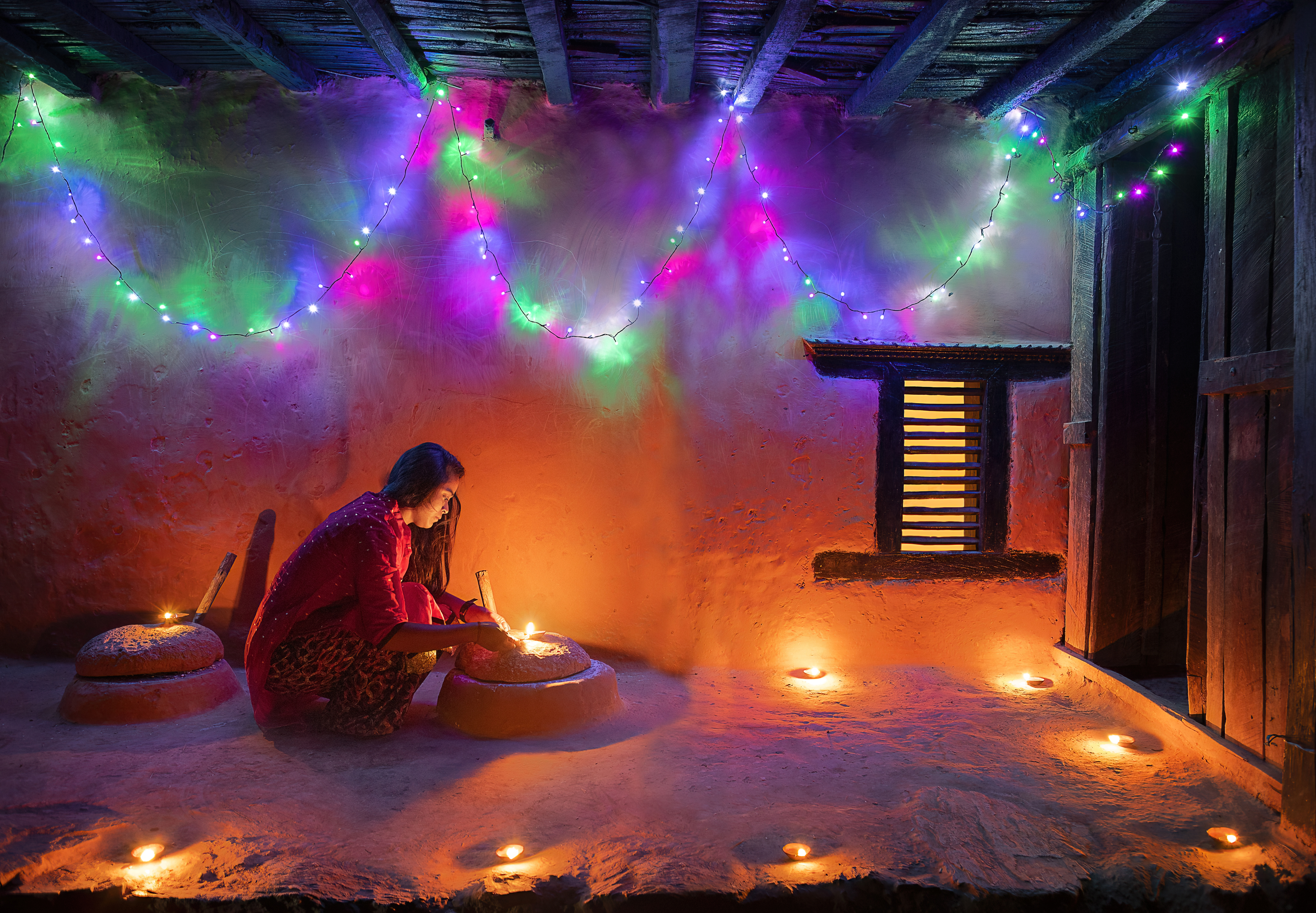
A woman lighting a diyo while surrounded by electric lights

The night of the third day of Tihar is called Lakshmi Puja. It is also considered the most important day of the Tihar festival. Goddess Lakshmi, the goddess of wealth and prosperity is welcomed into homes that have been cleaned and the doorways and windows decorated with garlands made out of marigolds.

Diyo lamps are lit throughout the home, especially at doorways and windows, while electric lights are draped over houses in the belief that the goddess will not visit dark homes. In the evening, a special Puja (worship) is performed, offering prayers for prosperity, wealth, and good health.

On this day, young children go from house to house singing and dancing in a tradition called Deusi/Bhailo. In return for their performance, they are offered money and traditional Nepali food such as Sel roti as a gesture of appreciation.

== Day 4 ==
=== Goru Puja (गोरु पूजा) ===
The fourth day of Tihar is called Goru Puja, during which the ox is worshipped. In Hinduism, the ox is regarded as the counterpart of the cow, valued especially for its role in agriculture and manual labour.

On the same day, many Vaishnav Hindu devotees also perform Govardhan Puja, offering worship to the sacred Govardhan Hill in reverence of Lord Krishna and his divine protection.

== Day 5 ==
=== Bhai Tika (भाइ टिका) ===
Bhai Tika Celebration

The fifth and last day of Tihar is called Bhai Tika. On this final day, which is celebrated with great enthusiasm across the country, brothers and sisters mark their special bond by worshipping each other through a mutual exchange of gifts in a public demonstration of their familial love.

The legend goes that when the goddess Yamuna's brother fell mortally ill, Yama the god of death came to take his soul. Yamuna pleaded with the death god to wait until she had finished her final puja for her brother. She then embarked on a long elaborate ceremony that grew to include Yama. The Yamuna then asked Yama to not take away her brother until the tika on his forehead had faded, the oil she had sprinkled on him had dried and the Makhamali Ful Ko Mala (Gomphrena globosa) garlands she had put around his neck had wilted.

Thus, on the fifth day of Tihar, sisters create a protective barrier of holy water and blessed oil around their brothers, circumambulating them several times. A special garland made out of the makhamali flower (Gomphrena globosa) is placed around the brother's neck as this flower is known for its long life. The tika placed on the forehead of the brother is also unique in that it consists of seven different colours. The tika is also placed on the sister's forehead by the brother.

The ceremony is performed regardless of whether the brother is older or younger than the sister and first or second cousins are also eligible for the ceremony. In the end, the brother touches the feet of their sisters with their forehead, signifying love, respect and devotion. The brothers receive a variety of cooked food such as sel roti, fruits and packaged food while the sisters receive cash or other gifts such as clothing.

== Tihar abroad ==
=== Australia ===
Tihar is celebrated annually by the Nepalese population in Australia through public events and cultural programs. In 2026, Australian Prime Minister Anthony Albanese also participated in the Nepal Festival organized by the Non-Resident Nepali Association (NRNA) Australia, which has been hosting the cultural events since 2006.

== See also ==
- Swanti
- Diwali
- List of Hindu festivals in Nepal
