= Astronomical basis of the Hindu calendar =

Applied astronomy of ancient India

An animation that illustrates a geocentric model of the Solar System.

The Hindu calendar is based on a geocentric model of the Solar System. A geocentric model describes the Solar System as seen by an observer on the surface of the Earth.

The Hindu calendar defines nine measures of time (Sanskrit: मान IAST:māna):

1. brāhma māna
2. divya māna
3. pitraya māna
4. prājāpatya māna
5. guror māna
6. saura māna
7. sāvana māna
8. chandra māna
9. nākṣatra māna

Of these, only the last four are in active use and are explained here.

== Chandra māna ==
The chandra māna (Sanskrit: चन्द्र मान) of the Hindu calendar is defined based on the movement of the Moon around the Earth. The new moon (Sanskrit: अमावास्य, romanized: amāvāsya) and full moon (Sanskrit: पूर्णिमा, romanized: pūrṇimā) are important markers in this calendar.

The chandra māna of the Hindu calendar defines the following synodic calendar elements:

Animation that illustrates cāndramāsa and pakṣa.

=== Pakṣa ===
A pakṣa (Sanskrit: पक्ष) is the time taken by the Moon to move from a new moon to a full moon and vice versa. The waxing phase of the moon is known as the bright side (Sanskrit: शुक्ल पक्ष, romanized: śukla pakṣa) and the waning phase is known as the dark side (Sanskrit: कृष्ण पक्ष, romanized: kṛṣṇa pakṣa). During a pakṣa, the Moon advances 180° with respect to the Earth-Sun axis.

=== Chandramāsa ===
Animation that illustrates cāndra māna varṣa.

A chāndramāsa (Sanskrit: चन्द्रमास) is the time taken by the moon to move from a new moon to the next new moon (as per the amānta [Sanskrit: अमान्त] tradition) or a full moon to the next full moon (as per the pūrṇimānta [Sanskrit: पूर्णिमान्त] tradition). (Note: All examples in this article assume the amānta tradition.) In other words a chāndramāsa is the synodic period of the Moon, or two pakṣas. During a chāndramāsa, the Moon advances 360° with respect to the Earth-Sun axis.

=== Chandra māna varṣa ===
A chandra māna varṣa or lunar year is made up of 12 consecutive chandramāsa. These twelve candramāsa are designated by unique names chaitra, vaiśākha, etc. (Note: These names are derived from the nakṣatra in which the Moon is positioned at the time of full moon.)

In some instances an additional chandramāsa, known as an adhikamāsa, is added to synchronise the chandra māna varṣa with the solar year or saura māna varṣa.

=== Tithi ===
Animation that illustrates cāndra māna tithi.

A tithi (Sanskrit: तिथि) is the time taken by the Moon to advance 12° with respect to the Earth-Sun axis. In other words a tithi is the time taken for the Moon's elongation (on the ecliptic plane) to increase by 12°. A tithi is one fifteenth of a pakṣa and one thirtieth of a cāndramāsa. A tithi corresponds to the concept of a lunar day.

Tithi have Sanskrit numbers according by their position in the pakṣa, i.e. prathama (first), dvitīya (second) etc. The fifteenth, that is, the last tithi of a kṛṣṇa pakṣa is called amāvāsya (new moon) and the fifteenth tithi of a śukla pakṣa is called pūrṇimā (full moon).

== Saura māna ==
The saura māna (Sanskrit: सौर मान) of the Hindu calendar is defined by the movement of the Earth around the Sun. It contains sidereal (Sanskrit: निरयन; nirayana) and tropical (Sanskrit: सायन; sāyana) elements.

=== Sidereal elements ===
Animation that illustrates the twelve rāśi (and sauramāsa) that make up a saura māna varṣa.

A saura māna varṣa or sidereal year is the time taken by the Sun to orbit the Earth once and return to the starting point with respect to the fixed stars. The starting point is taken to be the position of the Sun when it is in opposition to Spica (Sanskrit: चित्रा, romanized: citrā). (Note: Not everyone is in agreement with this definition. Mercier argues that Ketkar has interpreted a Sanskrit source in a way that is different from other authorities. Yet, this definition is widely used to create Hindu almanacs or pañcāṅga).).

A rāśi (Sanskrit: राशि) is a 30° arc of the orbit of the Sun around the Earth (i.e an arc of the ecliptic). Starting in the vicinity of Zeta Piscium (IAST: revatī), the twelve (i.e. 360° divided by 30°) rāśi are designated meṣa (Sanskrit: मेष), vṛṣabha (Sanskrit: वृषभ) etc. A sauramāsa (Sanskrit: सौरमास) is the time taken by the Sun to traverse a rāśi. Sauramāsa get their names from the corresponding rāśi. sauramāsa corresponds to the concept of a month. The moment in time when the Sun enters a rāśi is known as a saṅkramaṇa (Sanskrit: सङ्क्रमण) or saṅkrānti (Sanskrit: सङ्क्रान्ति).

Animation that illustrates uttarāyaṇa and dakṣiṇāyana.

Animation that illustrates devayāna and pitṛyāṇa.

=== Tropical elements ===
These time periods are defined based on the solstices (Sanskrit: अयन; IAST: ayana) and equinoxes (Sanskrit: विषुवत्; IAST: viṣuvat).

The time taken by the Sun to move from the winter solstice to the summer solstice is known as northward movement (Sanskrit: उत्तरायण, romanized: uttarāyaṇa) and time taken by the Sun to move from the summer solstice to the winter solstice is called southward movement (Sanskrit: दक्षिणायन, romanized: dakṣiṇāyana). Due to the axial tilt of the Earth, the Sun appears to move towards the north from the Tropic of Capricorn to the Tropic of Cancer during uttarāyaṇa, and towards the south from the tropic of Cancer to the tropic of Capricorn during dakṣiṇāyana. (Note: The Surya Siddhantha defines uttarāyaṇa and dakṣiṇāyana using rāśi instead of the equinoxes and solstices. That definition assumed a coincidence of the winter solstice and makara saṅkramaṇa. As a result of the precesstion of the equinoxes, that coincidence no longer exists thus making that definition incorrect. To illustrate, as per the Surya Siddhantha definition, the period from winter solstice (Dec 21) to makara saṅkramaṇa (Jan 14) is considered part of dakṣiṇāyana but the Sun is moving towards the north during this period.)

The time taken by the Sun to move from the spring equinox (ecliptic longitude 0°) to the autumnal equinox (ecliptic longitude 180°) is known as devayāna (Sanskrit: देवयान). The time taken by the Sun to move from the autumnal equinox to the spring equinox is designated as pitṛyāṇa (Sanskrit: पितृयाण). Due to the axial tilt of the Earth, the Sun appears to be in the north celestial sphere during devayāna and the south celestial sphere during pitṛyāṇa. In Hindu tradition, the north celestial sphere is consecrated to the gods (deva) and the south celestial sphere is consecrated to the ancestors (pitṛ). Devayāna and pitṛyāṇa are not in active calendric use any longer but do form the basis for pitṛpakṣa.

Animation that illustrates the six ṛtu (seasons).

A ṛtu (Sanskrit: ऋतु) (Note: The Surya Siddhanta defines ṛtu in terms of various rāśi assuming that makara saṅkramaṇa coincides with the winter solstice. Due to the precession of the equinoxes, that assumption is no longer true and hence those definitions of ṛtu are no longer accurate.) is the time taken by the Sun to move sixty degrees on its orbit around the Earth. (Note: Since a rāśi is a 30° arc of the ecliptic, a ṛtu can be considered as the time taken by the Sun to transit through two rāśi.) Ṛtu corresponds to the concept of a season.

The six ṛtu of the year are known as

- Śiśira ṛtu (winter)
- Vasanta ṛtu (spring)
- Grīṣma ṛtu (summer)
- Varṣā ṛtu the monsoon season, beginning at summer solstice
- Śarada ṛtu (autumn)
- Hemanta ṛtu (pre-winter)

== Nākṣhatra māna ==
Nākṣhatra māna (Sanskrit: नाक्षत्र मान) is defined with respect to the fixed stars, so all elements are sidereal in nature.

Animation that illustrates nākṣatra māna dina

A dina (Sanskrit: दिन) is the time taken by the celestial sphere to complete one sidereal rotation around the Earth. (Note: A sidereal rotation is defined with respect to the fixed stars, i.e. at the end of a sidereal rotation all the fixed stars are back in their starting position.) In reality, this movement is caused by the diurnal rotation of the Earth on its axis. This definition is not used in practice but is required for defining the following smaller units of time. A dina is ~4 minutes short of 24 hours.

A ghaṭikā (Sanskrit: घटिका) or nāḍī (Sanskrit: नाडी) is one sixtieth of a nakṣatra dina, or just under 24 minutes.

A vighaṭikā (Sanskrit: विघटिका) or vināḍī (Sanskrit: विनाडी) is one sixtieth of a ghaṭikā, or just under 24 seconds.

A prāṇa (Sanskrit: प्राण) or asu (Sanskrit: असु) is one sixth of a vighaṭikā, or just under four seconds.

== Sāvana māna ==
Sāvana māna (Sanskrit: सावन मान) of the Hindu calendar defines civil time.

Animation that illustrates sāvana māna dina.

A dina (Sanskrit: दिन) is the time between two succeeding sunrises. dina corresponds to the concept of a solar day. The length of a dina varies with daytime length.

== Nakṣhatra ==
Animation that illustrates the twenty seven nakṣhatra (asterism).

Apart from the four māna explained above, the concept of nakṣatra is an important characteristic of the Hindu calendar. This term has multiple meanings:

1. A nakṣhatra (Sanskrit: नक्षत्र) is a star.
2. A nakṣhatra is an asterism. One of the stars in the asterism is designated as its principal star (Sanskrit: योगतारा; IAST:yogatārā). There are twenty eight such nakṣatra and they are individually named. The name of a nakṣatra and its yogatārā are identical. For example, revatī is an asterism whose principal star is revatī (Zeta Piscium).
3. A nakṣatra is a 13° 20' arc of the ecliptic. There are twenty seven such nakṣhatra (i.e. 360° divided by 13° 20'). Starting in the vicinity of revatī (Zeta Piscium), they are named aśvinī, bharaṇī etc. (Note: abhijit is an asterism for which there is no corresponding arc segment.) These names are identical to the names of the asterisms that are located within the respective arc segments. For example, revatī refers to both an asterism and the arc segment within which the asterism is located.
4. In calendric terms, a nakṣatra is the time taken by the Moon to traverse a nakṣatra (as defined in point 3). Hence, nakṣatra is a sidereal element (unlike the tithi which it is similar to) and corresponds to the concept of a day.

== Combining the different measures of time ==
The four māna explained above are used in combination in the Hindu calendar.

Animation that illustrates adhikamāsa.

adhikamāsa

As seen above, both the cāndra māna and saura māna of the calendar define a varṣa comprising twelve māsa, but the duration of the varṣa differ; the cāndra māna varṣa is shorter than the saura māna varṣa by about eleven sāvana dina. As a result, unless explicitly synchronised, these two parts of the calendar will diverge over time, as the cāndra māna varṣa will keep "falling behind" the saura māna varṣa.

In order to synchronise these two parts of the calendar, an additional cāndramāsa is introduced into some cāndra māna varṣa. (Note: This is a common calendric technique and is known as intercalation) Such a cāndramāsa is referred to as adhikamāsa (Sanskrit: अधिकमास). A adhikamāsa takes its name from the name of the cāndramāsa which follows, viz. adhika āśvina precedes āśvina.

Most times every cāndramāsa witnesses a saṅkramaṇa. If a cāndramāsa does not witness a saṅkramaṇa, that cāndramāsa is designated as a adhikamāsa thus resulting in the cāndra māna varṣa "catching up" with the saura māna varṣa. This happens approximately once every two and a half (solar) years.

dina and tithi

As seen above, both the cāndra māna and sāvana māna of the calendar define the concept of a day as tithi and dina respectively. dina are not named and are not used for calendric purposes. The tithi takes precedence instead. (Note: As a result, almost all Hindu festivals are defined in cāndra māna terms. Hence these annual festivals do not repeat on the same day on any solar calendar (neither saurana māna nor Gregorian).)

Human life is regulated by the rising of the Sun and not by the movement of the Moon through a 12° arc. Hence, the position of the Moon at sunrise is used to determine the tithi prevailing at sunrise. This tithi is then associated with the entire sāvana dina.

To illustrate: consider the Gregorian date 18th Sep 2021. Instead of referring to it as "2nd dina of kanyā masa" Hindus will refer to it as " bhādrapada māsa, śukla pakṣa, dvitiyā tithi", which is the tithi prevailing at sunrise on that sāvana dina. Even though the Moon moves into the trayodaśī arc soon after sunrise (at 6:54AM), that entire sāvana dina is considered to be dvādaśī tithi.

Animation that illustrates adhika tithi

Animation that illustrates kṣaya tithi

adhika tithi and kṣaya tithi

It is possible that two consecutive sunrises may have the same tithi, i.e. the Moon continues to remain within the same 12° arc across two consecutive sunrises. In such a case, two consecutive sāvana dina will be associated with the same tithi. The tithi associated with the second sāvana dina is referred to as a adhika (Sanskrit: अधिक) (additional) tithi.

It is also possible that an entire tithi elapses between two sunrises, i.e. the Moon traverses a 12° arc in between two sunrises (it enters the arc after one sunrise and exits the arc before the next sunrise). In this such a case, neither sāvana dina will be associated with this tithi, i.e. this tithi will be skipped over in the calendar. Such a tithi is referred to as a kṣaya (Sanskrit: क्षय) (lost) tithi.

Subdivisions of a sāvana dina

Above that a nakṣatra dina is divided into ghaṭikā (of 24 modern minutes each) and vighaṭikā (of 24 modern seconds each). These same units are used to subdivide a savana dina using sunrise as the starting point, i.e. the first 24 minutes after sunrise constitute the first ghaṭikā, the next 24 minutes the second ghaṭikā and so on.

pitṛpakṣa

pitṛpakṣa (Sanskrit: पितृपक्ष) is a pakṣa during which the Sun crosses the equator and transitions overhead the southern hemisphere, i.e. the autumnal equinox occurs within pitṛpakṣa. (Note: Since the south celestial sphere is consecrated to the ancestors (IAST:pitṛ), Hindus perform special religious rites in honour of their ancestors during pitṛpakṣa.)

bhādrapada māsa kṛṣṇa pakṣa is identified with pitṛpakṣa. This identification is not always correct. For instance, in the Gregorian year 2020, bhādrapada māsa kṛṣṇa pakṣa ended with the new moon on 17 September while autumnal equinox occurred five days later, on 22 September.

== See also ==
- Nirayana system

== Bibliography ==
- Burgess, Ebenezer (1935). Gangooly, Phanidarlal (ed.). Translation of the Surya Siddhanta – a text-book of Hindu astronomy (PDF). University of Calcutta.
- Ketkar, Venkatesh Bapuji (1923). "Indian and Foreign Chronology". Journal of the Asiatic Society of Bombay (75, Part 1). British Indian Press.
- Mercier, Raymond (2018). Astronomical Computations for the History of Indian Astronomy. New Delhi: Munshiram Manoharlal Publishers Pvt. Ltd. ISBN 978-81-215-1177-3.
- Tilak, Bal Gangadhar (1955). The Orion or Researches into the Antiquity of the Vedas (PDF). Tilak Bros.
