= 2024 Thame flood =

Glacier Lake Outburst Flood in 2024 in Napal

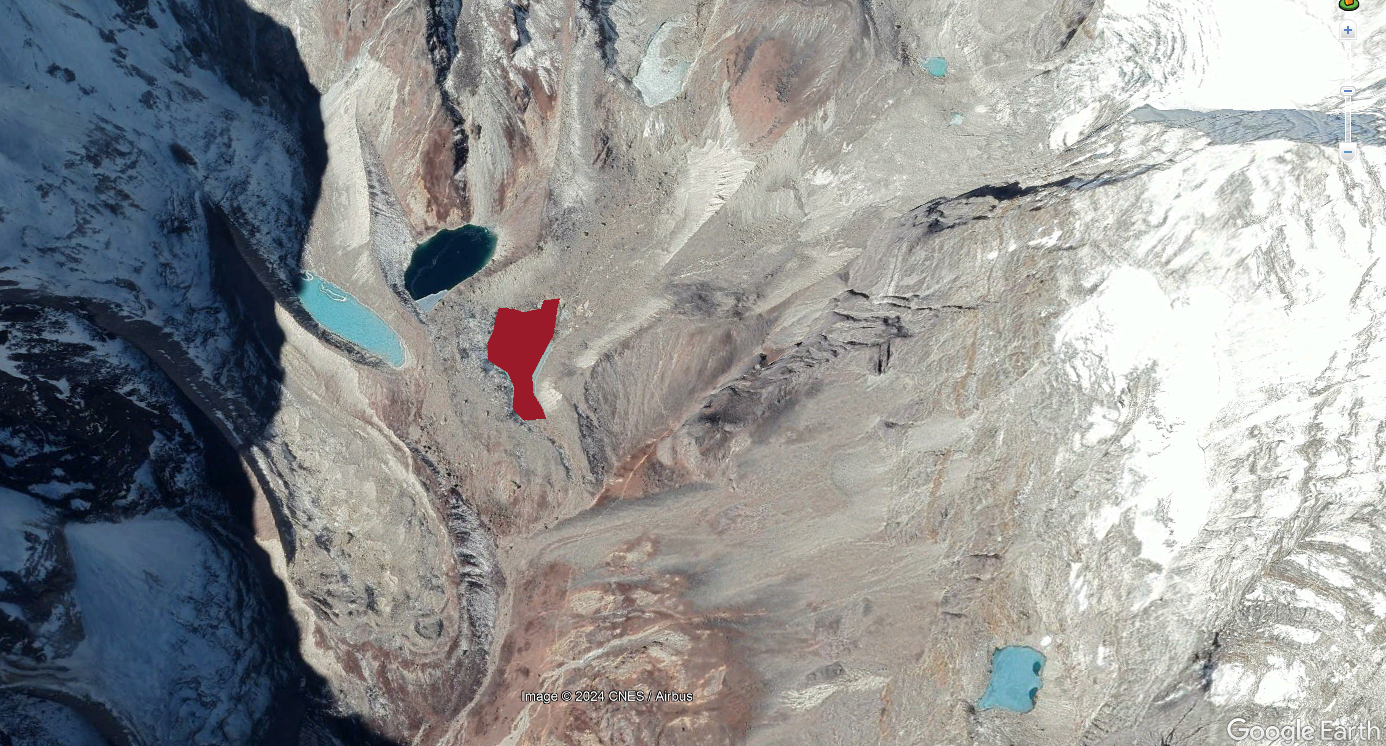
Location of lake burst shown in red hatch

On 16 August 2024, two glacier lakes burst in Thame village of the Everest region in Solukhumbu District of Nepal, causing a glacier lake outburst flood (GLOF). The flood damaged a number of households in Khumbu Pasanglhamu Rural Municipality.

Glacial lake outburst floods occur when water suddenly drains from a glacier-fed lake after the failure of a natural dam made of ice or moraine. These floods are a recognized hazard in the Himalayas, where expanding glacial lakes and unstable moraine dams can increase the risk of downstream flooding.

In recent decades, scientists and disaster-risk agencies have raised growing concern about glacial lake hazards in the Himalayan region. Rising temperatures have contributed to glacier retreat and the formation or expansion of moraine-dammed lakes, some of which are located upstream of populated valleys. Monitoring programs in Nepal have identified several lakes as potentially dangerous, particularly where settlements and infrastructure lie downstream.

== Causes ==
Initially, the flooding was believed to have resulted from a river blockage breached by a landslide. However, later aerial inspections confirmed that the disaster was caused by the outburst of upstream glacial lakes. Investigators reported that two lakes had burst, while one of the remaining lakes was considered stable and two others remained under observation.

Further investigation showed that the event involved a chain reaction between two glacial lakes located about 10km upstream of Thame. Evidence suggests that a disturbance on the surrounding slope, such as falling rock, ice, or debris, entered an upper lake and created a surge that overtopped its moraine outlet. The released water then flowed into a lower lake, contributing to the failure of its moraine dam and sending a large volume of water, sediment, and debris downstream toward the village.

Remote sensing studies also found that several lakes in the area had expanded or changed in size in recent years as glaciers retreated, increasing instability. At the time of the event, both lakes were reportedly filled with meltwater following an extended warm period.

Meteorological reports further noted rising temperatures in the days before the disaster. Temperatures increased from 9 August and peaked at about 15°C on the day of the flood, conditions believed to have contributed to meltwater buildup and made conditions more unstable.

== Impact ==
The flood, which occurred suddenly, caused extensive damage to Thame, a Sherpa village in Nepal's Everest region. Local authorities reported that 14 properties were destroyed, including seven homes, five hotels, a school, and a health post. It displaced 135 people, including 40 children, although no deaths or injuries were reported. Most residents had already left for Kathmandu or were at the weekly marketplace in Namche, and the school was closed for the day. The absence of casualties was largely attributed to the flood occurring during the daytime, allowing residents to reach higher ground.

The flood significantly changed the landscape of the valley. Floodwaters created a deep channel through parts of the settlements, destroying buildings and leaving sections of the area covered in debris and boulders. The course of the Thame River shifted, with the river flowing through parts of the village that had previously been inhabited. The flood also disrupted key road networks and communication services.

== Response and recovery ==
The Department of Hydrology and Meteorology issued warnings for potential further flooding and landslides, advising evacuation for those living along the Dudhkoshi River. Search and rescue operations were carried out by the Nepali Army and Nepal Police. The Ministry of Home Affairs coordinated disaster response efforts, and local officials provided relief to the affected residents.

Following the flood, officials from the National Disaster Risk Reduction and Management Authority conducted aerial inspections of the affected area and reported that additional glacial lakes remained upstream of Thame, raising concerns about future outburst floods. The disaster also brought attention to risk-reduction efforts in Nepal, including flood warning systems, lake-lowering projects, and preparedness training at glacial lakes such as Tsho Rolpa and Imja Tsho.

UNESCO initiated a project to document the cultural impacts of the flood on Thame's Sherpa community and to explore how traditional knowledge can support climate resilience in the Sagarmatha National Park region. Another program, which was funded with about US$36 million through the Green Climate Fund and implemented by the United Nations Development Programme, aims to strengthen Nepal's capacity to manage GLOF risks and support vulnerable communities.

== Broader context ==
Scientists have raised concern about GLOF hazards across the Himalaya-Karakoram region as rising temperatures contribute to glacier retreat and the expansion of glacial lakes. Researchers have documented hundreds of past GLOF events in High Mountain Asia, many involving moraine-dammed or ice-dammed lakes that can release large volumes of water and debris downstream. The continued expansion of these lakes, combined with growing populations in mountain valleys, may increase the potential impacts of future floods in the region.

== See also ==
- Glacier lake outburst flood (GLOF)
- 2026 Nepal floods
- 2024 Nepal floods
- 2021 Nepal floods
- 2020 Nepal floods
- 2019 Nepal floods
- May 2012 Nepal floods
- 2024 in Nepal
