= 2024 in Nepal =

- Decades: 2000s; 2010s; 2020s; 2030s
- See also: Other events of 2024; Timeline of Nepalese history

Events in the year 2024 in Nepal.

== Incumbents ==
- President: Ram Chandra Poudel
- Vice President: Ram Sahaya Yadav
- Prime Minister: Pushpa Kamal Dahal (until 15 July)
  - Khadga Prasad Oli onwards
- Chief Justice: Bishowambhar Prasad Shrestha
- Speaker of House of Representatives: Dev Raj Ghimire
- Chairman of National Assembly: Ganesh Prasad Timilsina (until 3 March)
  - Narayan Prasad Dahal from 12 March onwards

=== Provincial Governors ===
- Governor of Bagmati Province:
  - Yadav Chandra Sharma
  - Deepak Prasad Devkota
- Governor of Gandaki Province:
  - Prithvi Man Gurung
  - Dilli Raj Bhatta
- Governor of Karnali Province:
  - Tilak Pariyar
  - Yagya Raj Joshi
- Governor of Koshi Province: Parshuram Khapung
- Governor of Lumbini Province:
  - Amik Sherchan
  - Krishna Bahadur Gharti
- Governor of Madhesh Province:
  - Hari Shankar Mishra
  - Sumitra Bhandari
- Governor of Sudurpashchim Province:
  - Dev Raj Joshi
  - Najir Miya

== Events ==
=== January ===
- 5 January – Nepal stops issuing permits to its citizens to work in Russia and Ukraine after 10 Nepalis are killed while serving in the Russian Army.

=== March ===
- 4 March – Prime Minister Pushpa Kamal Dahal ends his coalition agreement with the Nepali Congress and forms a new coalition government with the Communist Party of Nepal (Unified Marxist-Leninist) and other smaller parties.

=== May ===
- 3 May – The Supreme Court of Nepal orders the government to limit the number of permits it issues to those seeking to climb Mount Everest and other mountain peaks in the country to preserve the mountains and their environment.
- 21 May – Kailash Sirohiya, the owner of Nepal's largest news organisation Kantipur Publications, is arrested at company offices in Kathmandu for alleged violations of citizenship laws after his citizenship card number is found to share that of another.

=== June ===
- 26 June – Two days of heavy rains in Nepal kills 20 people.
- 29 June – Landslides in Nepal kill nine people.

=== July ===
- 1 July – A court in Sarlahi sentences Buddhist religious figure Ram Bahadur Bomjon to ten years' imprisonment and damage payments of $3,700 for sexually assaulting a minor.
- 3 July – The Communist Party of Nepal (Unified Marxist-Leninist) withdraws from Prime Minister Pushpa Kamal Dahal's governing coalition after entering into a coalition agreement with the Nepali Congress.
- 7 July – At least 11 people are killed and eight others are missing due to heavy rainfall causing flash floods and landslides across Nepal.
- 12 July:
  - Madan Ashrit Highway disaster: At least 11 people are killed and around 51 others are reported missing after two buses are swept off the Narayangarh - Mugling highway in Chitwan District by a landslide and fall into the Trishuli River. About 500 rescuers are involved in the search for survivors.
  - Prime Minister Pushpa Kamal Dahal steps down after losing a no-confidence motion filed against him in the House of Representatives.
- 14 July – Khadga Prasad Oli, the leader of the Communist Party of Nepal (Unified Marxist-Leninist), is named Prime Minister as part of a coalition with the Nepali Congress. He is formally inaugurated on 15 July.
- 24 July – 2024 Saurya Airlines Bombardier CRJ200 crash: Eighteen of 19 people aboard a passenger aircraft are killed during its takeoff at Tribhuvan International Airport in Kathmandu. The only survivor is the pilot.

=== August ===
- 7 August – A Eurocopter AS350 belonging to Air Dynasty flying from Kathmandu to Syaprubeshi crashes into a forested mountain in Suryachaur, Nuwakot District, killing all four Chinese passengers on board and the pilot.
- 16 August – The village of Thame in Solukhumbu District is inundated by a glacial lake outburst flood that destroys at least 15 structures.
- 22 August – The government lifts a ban on TikTok that had been imposed since November 2023.
- 23 August – A bus carrying Indian pilgrims on its way to Kathmandu to Pokhara plunges from the Prithvi Highway into the Marshyangdi River near Anbu Khaireni, killing at least 27 people and injuring 16 others.
- 30 August – Palesha Goverdhan becomes the first Nepalese athlete to win a medal at a Paralympics after winning bronze at the women's K44-57 kg para taekwondo category in the 2024 Summer Paralympics in Paris.

=== September ===
- 27 September–1 October – At least 224 people are killed and 24 others are reported missing following nationwide flooding and landslides caused by heavy rains.

=== October ===
- 8 October – Five Russian climbers are found dead on Dhaulagiri after being reported missing on 6 October.
- 9 October – Activist Deepti Gurung is awarded the Nansen Refugee Award by the United Nations High Commissioner for Refugees, citing her work in helping amend the country's citizenship laws after her daughters were designated as stateless persons.
- 18 October – Former deputy prime minister Rabi Lamichhane is arrested on suspicion of fraud and organised crime involving the alleged embezzlement of funds from a financial cooperative.

=== November ===
- 15 November – A van falls off a mountain road near Shaileshikar, killing eight people and injuring four others.

== Arts and entertainment ==
- List of Nepalese films
- List of highest-grossing films in Nepal
- List of Nepalese films of 2024
- Cinema of Nepal

== Holidays ==
- 11 January – Prithvi Jayanti
- 15 January – Maghe Sankranti
- 10 February – Sonam Lhosar
- 10 February – Gyalpo Lhosar
- 19 February – Prajatantra Diwas
- 8 March – International Women's Day
- 8 March – Maha Shivaratri
- 8 April – Ghode Jatra
- 10 April – Eid al-Fitr
- 13 April – Nepali New Year
- 16 April – Rama Navami
- 24 April – Loktantra Diwas
- 1 May – Labour Day
- 23 May – Buddha's Birthday
- 29 May – Ganatantra Diwas
- 17 June – Eid al-Adha
- 19 August – Raksha Bandhan
- 20 August – Gai Jatra
- 26 August – Gaura Parba
- 26 August – Krishna Janmashtami
- 6 September – Haritalika Teej
- 17 September – Indra Jatra
- 19 September – Constitution Day
- 3 October – Ghatasthapana
- 13 October – Vijayadashami
- 1 November – Laxmi Puja
- 2 November – Govardhan Puja
- 3 November – Bhai Tika
- 7 November – Chhath Puja
- 15 November – Guru Nanak Jayanti
- 15 December – Udhauli Parva
- 25 December – Christmas Day
- 30 December – Tamu Lhosar

== Deaths ==
- 26 February – Bhakta Raj Acharya, 81, singer and composer
- 18 March – Parashu Pradhan, 80, author
- 16 May – Dharmapaal Barsingh Thapa, 85, military officer, chief of Army Staff (1995–1999)
- 17 November - Daman Nath Dhungana, 83, politician
