= 2025 in Nepal =

- Decades: 2000s; 2010s; 2020s
- See also: Other events of 2025; Timeline of Nepalese history

Events in the year 2025 in Nepal.

== Incumbents ==
- President: Ram Chandra Poudel
- Vice President: Ram Sahaya Yadav
- Prime Minister: Khadga Prasad Oli (until 12 September); Sushila Karki (acting, since 12 September)
- Chief Justice: Bishowambhar Prasad Shrestha
- Speaker of House of Representatives: Dev Raj Ghimire
- Chairman of National Assembly: Narayan Prasad Dahal

=== Provincial Governors ===
- Governor of Bagmati Province: Deepak Prasad Devkota
- Governor of Gandaki Province: Dilli Raj Bhatta
- Governor of Karnali Province: Yagya Raj Joshi
- Governor of Koshi Province: Parshuram Khapung
- Governor of Lumbini Province: Krishna Bahadur Gharti
- Governor of Madhesh Province: Sumitra Bhandari
- Governor of Sudurpashchim Province: Najir Miya

== Events ==
=== January ===
- 7 January – A magnitude 7.1 earthquake with an epicentre in neighbouring Tibet shakes parts of Nepal, injuring at least 13 people across the country.
- 15 January – The Supreme Court of Nepal strikes down several laws that allowed for the construction of hydropower and hotel projects in protected nature reserves.

=== February ===
- 27 February – A magnitude 5.5 earthquake hits Bagmati Province, injuring six people.

=== March ===
- 28 March – Two people, including a journalist, are killed during clashes between police and monarchist demonstrators in Kathmandu.

=== April ===
- 4 April – A magnitude 4.9 earthquake hits Karnali Province, injuring eight people.
- 9 April – Heavy rain and storms cause widespread damage, with at least eight deaths reported nationwide.
- 28 April – An Austrian climber is reported dead on Ama Dablam after going missing on 26 April.

=== May ===
- 4 May – An American climber dies after suffering a cardiac arrest while descending from Makalu.

=== June ===
- 10 June – The European Union adds Nepal to its list of high risk jurisdictions for money laundering and terrorism financing.

=== July ===
- 8 July – The Friendship Bridge connecting Nepal's Rasuwa District with China is swept away due to flooding along the Bhotekoshi River, killing nine people and leaving 19 others missing.

=== August ===
- 17 August – Heavy monsoon rains trigger sudden floods and landslidess nationwide, killing at least 41 people and injuring 121 others, according to the national disaster management authority.
- 27 August – The Supreme Court of Nepal rejects a petition to bar naga sadhus from entering the Pashupatinath Temple and other Shaivite temples, saying that nudity in the name of religion cannot be regarded as obscene.

=== September ===
- 4 September – The government orders the blocking of 24 social media platforms including Facebook, X and YouTube for failing to register with it.
- 8 September – Nationwide protests are carried out by youths primarily against the social media ban and corruption. Clashes with police initially kill at least 72 people and injure over 2,100. The unrest prompts the resignation of Home Minister Ramesh Lekhak and the lifting of the social media ban.
- 9 September –
  - K. P. Sharma Oli resigns as prime minister following the 2025 Nepalese Gen Z protests.
  - The headquarters of the Federal Parliament of Nepal, multiple government buildings and the residences of leading politicians in Kathmandu are set on fire by antigovernment protesters.
- 12 September –
  - Former chief justice Sushila Karki is appointed as interim prime minister, making her the first woman to hold the office.
  - President Poudel dissolves parliament following the recommendation of interim prime minister Karki in preparation for elections due on 5 March 2026.
- 22 September – Polish climber Andrzej Bargiel becomes the first person to ski down Mount Everest without the use of supplemental oxygen.
- 30 September – Two-year-old Aryatara Shakya is installed as the new Kumari Devi in Kathmandu, succeeding Trishna Shakya who held the position since 2017.

=== October ===
- 5 October – At least 44 people are reported killed in nationwide landslides and flooding caused by heavy rains.
- 7 October – A South Korean climber is killed in a storm on Mera Peak.
- 20 October – The remains of Bipin Joshi, a student who died in captivity in the Gaza Strip after being abducted by Hamas in the 7 October attacks, are repatriated to Nepal.

=== November ===
- 3 November – Seven climbers, including five foreign nationals, are killed in an avalanche on Mount Yalung Ri.

== Arts and entertainment ==
- List of Nepalese films
- List of highest-grossing films in Nepal
- Cinema of Nepal

== Holidays ==
- 11 January – Prithvi Jayanti
- 14 January – Maghe Sankranti
- 30 January – Sonam Lhosar
- 30 January – Gyalpo Lhosar
- 19 February – Prajatantra Diwas
- 26 February – Maha Shivaratri
- 8 March – International Women's Day
- 29 March – Ghode Jatra
- 31 March – Eid al-Fitr
- 6 April – Rama Navami
- 14 April – Nepali New Year
- 24 April – Loktantra Diwas
- 1 May – Labour Day
- 12 May – Buddha's Birthday
- 29 May – Ganatantra Diwas
- 7 June – Eid al-Adha
- 9 August – Raksha Bandhan
- 10 August – Gai Jatra
- 16 August – Gaura Parba
- 16 August – Krishna Janmashtami
- 26 August – Haritalika Teej
- 6 September – Indra Jatra
- 19 September – Constitution Day
- 22 September – Ghatasthapana
- 2 October – Vijayadashami
- 20 October – Laxmi Puja
- 22 October – Govardhan Puja
- 23 October – Bhai Tika
- 27 October – Chhath Puja
- 5 November – Guru Nanak Jayanti
- 5 December – Udhauli Parva
- 25 December – Christmas Day
- 30 December – Tamu Lhosar

== Deaths ==
- 2 January - Sachin Pariyar, Nepali child singer
- 1 April - Deepak Bohara, politician.
- 7 April - Bhairab Risal, journalist.
- 6 May - Pradeep Nepal, politician and writer.
- 12 July - Gadul Singh Lama, fiction writer, poet and translator
- 16 October – Kanchha Sherpa, 92, mountaineer (1953 British Mount Everest expedition)
- 24 October - Neetu Paudel, singer
- 30 October - Kamal Gautam, politician
- 8 November – Mohammad Aftab Alam, 63, MP (1997–2002, 2018–2019)
- 25 December - Minash Thapa, cricketer
