= 2027 in Nepal =

- Decades: 2000s; 2010s; 2020s
- See also: Other events of 2027; Timeline of Nepalese history

Events in the year 2027 in Nepal.

== Events ==
=== Scheduled ===
- 21 January – 6 February – 2027 Under-19 Women's T20 World Cup in Bangladesh and Nepal

== Holidays ==
- 11 January – Prithvi Jayanti
- 14 January – Maghe Sankranti
- 30 January –
  - Martyr's Day
  - Sonam Lhosar
- 19 February – Prajatantra Diwas
- 26 February – Maha Shivaratri
- 28 February – Gyalpo Lhosar
- 8 March – International Women's Day
- 29 March – Ghode Jatra
- 31 March – Ramjan Edul Fikra
- 6 April – Rama Navami
- 14 April – Nepali New Year
- 24 April – Loktantra Diwas
- 1 May – Labour Day
- 12 May – Buddha's Birthday
- 29 May – Ganatantra Diwas
- 7 June – Eid al-Adha
- 9 August – Raksha Bandhan
- 10 August – Gai Jatra
- 16 August –
  - Gaura Parba
  - Krishna Janmashtami
- 28 August – Rishi Panchami
- 3 September – Haritalika Teej
- 6 September – Indra Jatra
- 19 September – Constitution Day
- 22 September – Ghatasthapana
- 2 October – Vijayadashami
- 3 October – Ekadashi
- 4 October – Dvadashi
- 5 October – Kojagrat Purnima
- 20 October – Laxmi Puja
- 22 October – Govardhan Puja
- 23 October – Bhai Tika
- 27 October – Chhath Puja
- 5 November – Guru Nanak Jayanti
- 5 December – Udhauli Parva
- 25 December – Christmas Day
- 30 December – Tamu Lhosar
