= 2026 in Nepal =

- Decades: 2000s; 2010s; 2020s
- See also: Other events of 2026; Timeline of Nepalese history

Events in the year 2026 in Nepal.

== Incumbents ==
- President: Ram Chandra Poudel
- Vice President: Ram Sahaya Yadav
- Prime Minister: Sushila Karki (acting, until 27 March), Balen Shah (since 27 March)
- Chief Justice: Bishowambhar Prasad Shrestha
- Speaker of House of Representatives: Dev Raj Ghimire
- Chairman of National Assembly: Narayan Prasad Dahal

== Events ==
=== January ===
- 2 January – An aircraft belonging to Buddha Air overshoots the runway while landing at Bhadrapur Airport from Kathmandu, injuring seven people.
- 6 January – A curfew is declared in Birgunj following protests over the vandalism of a mosque.
- 12 January – 2 February – 2026 Women's T20 World Cup Qualifier
- 26 January – Six people are arrested as part of an investigation into insurance fraud involving fraudulent helicopter rescues of travellers valued at $19.69 million.

=== February ===
- 5 February – A bus falls off a mountain road in Baitadi District, killing 13 people and injuring 34 others.
- 23 February – A bus falls into the Trishuli River in Dhading District, killing 19 people and injuring 25 others.

=== March ===
- 2 March – A vehicle carrying an election team plunges in Ramechhap, killing two people.
- 5 March – 2026 Nepalese general election: The Rastriya Swatantra Party wins a majority in the House of Representatives.
- 14 March – A bus carrying Indian pilgrims falls off a mountain near Shahid Lakhan, killing seven people and injuring nine others.
- 27 March – Following his Rastriya Swatantra Party's landslide victory in the general election, Balendra Shah is sworn as Prime Minister of Nepal, succeeding interim prime minister Sushila Karki.
- 28 March – Former prime minister K. P. Sharma Oli is arrested over his alleged involvement in the crackdown on the 2025 Nepalese Gen Z protests.

=== April ===
- 5 April – Nepal announces that government and educational institutions will have two days off work during the week instead of one, as part of an effort to save fuel.
- 30 April – A jeep carrying pilgrims plunges off a cliff in Rolpa District, killing 20 people.

=== May ===
- 11 May – A Turkish Airlines passenger aircraft catches fire while landing at Tribhuvan International Airport in Kathmandu. All passengers and crew are evacuated.

=== July ===
- 26 July – Hindu–Muslim communal riots break out in southern Nepal, leaving at least three people dead.

=== August ===
- 26 August – At least 1,451 people are killed following a flash flood along the border with Tibet.

=== September ===
- 8 September – A magnitude 4.9 earthquake hits Gandaki Province, causing extensive damage in Mustang District.
- 10 September – Gauri Kumar Yadav resigns as industry minister amid criticism over her remarks on the liquified petroleum gas bottling sector.
- 27 September –
  - An avalanche hits a base camp near Himlung Himal peak, killing at least four people.
  - Former chief justice Cholendra Shumsher JB Rana is briefly taken into police custody under unspecified circumstances.

=== October ===
- 26 October – 2026 Nepal Premier League, the third edition of the Nepal Premier League begins in Kirtipur.

=== November ===
- 3 November – Two helicopters collide while landing at the South Base Camp of Mount Everest, killing an Indian national.
- 12 November – A van veers off a mountain road in Bhimphedi, killing 10 people and injuring five more.
- 21 November – The third edition of the Nepal Premier League concludes at the Tribhuvan University International Cricket Ground in Kirtipur. Sudurpaschim Royals win their maiden NPL title, defeating defending champions Lumbini Lions by 10 wickets in the final.

== Holidays ==
- 11 January – Prithvi Jayanti
- 14 January – Maghe Sankranti
- 30 January – Martyr's Day
- 15 February – Maha Shivaratri
- 18 January –
  - Sonam Lhosar
  - Gyalpo Lhosar
- 19 February – Prajatantra Diwas
- 8 March – International Women's Day
- 18 March – Ghode Jatra
- 21 March – Ramjan Edul Fikra
- 27 March – Rama Navami
- 14 April – Nepali New Year
- 22 April – Loktantra Diwas
- 1 May –
  - Labour Day
  - Buddha's Birthday
- 27 May – Eid al-Adha
- 29 May – Ganatantra Diwas
- 28 August – Raksha Bandhan
- 29 August – Gai Jatra
- 4 September –
  - Gaura Parba
  - Krishna Janmashtami
- 14 September – Haritalika Teej
- 16 September – Rishi Panchami
- 19 September – Constitution Day
- 25 September – Indra Jatra
- 11 October – Ghatasthapana
- 20 October – Vijayadashami
- 22 October – Ekadashi
- 23 October – Dvadashi
- 24 October – Kojagrat Purnima
- 8 November – Laxmi Puja
- 10 November – Govardhan Puja
- 11 November – Bhai Tika
- 15 November – Chhath Puja
- 24 November – Guru Nanak Jayanti
- 24 December – Udhauli Parva
- 25 December – Christmas Day
- 30 December – Tamu Lhosar

== Deaths ==
- 3 January – Nam Singh Thapa, 79, Olympic boxer (1964).
- 7 February – Sunil Thapa, 68, actor.
- 14 February – Bishwa Bandhu Thapa, 98, MP (1959–1960) and chairman of the Rastriya Panchayat (1963–1964).
- 30 July –
  - Pur Bahadur Gurung, 37, mountaineer and expedition guide.
  - Nirmal Purja, 43, mountaineer.
- 16 September – Him Bahadur Shahi, 80, Punjab MPA (2008–2018, since 2025).
- 23 September – Suresh Raj Sharma, 86, vice chancellor of Kathmandu University (1991–2012).
