= Public holidays in Nepal =

Bikram Sambat is the official and the day to day calendar of Nepal while the Gregorian calendar is used for international events and holidays. Additionally, since 2023, Nepal Sambat dates are written alongside Bikram Sambat.

Weekends in Nepal are different for each sector. All schools and government offices are closed on Saturdays and Sundays whereas most private offices are only closed on Saturdays. All government holidays for the upcoming year are published in Nepal Gazette. Nepal celebrates a number of religious and non-religious holidays. On most of these holidays, most government offices and private institutions are closed, although is not mandatory for privately owned businesses to close and international organizations may operate their own calendar.

Some of these events are region-, religion-, or gender-specific. For example, the Teej holiday in Nepal is only a holiday for women.

The Government of Nepal has decided to grant a nationwide holiday for a total of 35 days in the year 2079 BS (1142 NS).

The longest consecutive public holiday in Nepal is during Vijaya Dashami. On this festival, holidays fall consecutively i.e. from Fulpati to Duwadashi for seven days. Ghatasthapana and Kojagrat Purnima holidays are part of this festival but are separate from the six-day holiday. These festival holidays do not fall on the same calendar date every year, as they are celebrated on the basis of lunar dates also known as tithi. Holidays such as Loktantra Diwas (Democracy Day) and Republic Day are celebrated on the same date annually.

== General holidays ==
The following is a list of national holidays in Nepal (most of which follow the Nepali calendar).

National
Religious
International
Birth & Anniversary

=== Day holiday ===
Date	Name		Remarks
Date	English	Nepali	Remarks
Jestha 15	Republic Day	गणतन्त्र दिवस	Republic Day in Nepal.
Ashoj 3	Constitution Day	संविधान दिवस	Constitution Day in Nepal.
Magh 16	Martyrs' Day	शहिद दिवस	Martyrs' Day in Nepal remembering the first four Martyrs of Nepal.
Fagun 7	Democracy Day	प्रजातन्त्र दिवस	Democracy day of Nepal.
May 1	International Workers' Day	मजदुर दिवस	International Workers' Day
March 8	International Women's Day	नारी दिवस	International Women's Day is celebrated on this day in Nepal.

=== Festival holiday ===
Date	Name		Remarks
Date	English	Nepali	Remarks
Baishak 1	Nepali New Year	नयाँ बर्ष	First day of Bikram Sambat calendar.
Bhadra 12	Raksha Bandhan	रक्षा बन्धन/जनै पुर्णिमा	Sacred thread festival, Janai Purnima marks the renewal of the sacred thread by Brahmins. Raksha Bandhan celebrates the holi bond between brothers and sisters.
Bhadra 19	Krishna Janmashtami	कृष्णा जन्माअष्टमी	Celebrates the birth of Lord Krishna
Ashwoj 25	Ghatasthapana	घटस्थापना	The beginning of Dashain.
Ashoj 31	Fulpati	फुलपाती	Seventh day of Dashaini when jamara is brought from Gorkha palace to Kathmandu.
Kartik 1	Maha Asthami	महा अष्टमी	The day to appease Goddess Durga's manifestations, the blood-thirsty Kali.
Kartik 2	Dashain Holiday	दशैं बिदा	Additional Holiday
Kartik 3	Maha Navami	महा नवमी	Maha Navami is the last day of Navaratri.
Kartik 4	Vijayadashami	विजया दशमी	This day is very important day for Nepalese Hindu religion, On Bijaya Dashami mixture of rice, yogurt and vermilion is prepared and is known as Tika. Elders put Tika, Jamara and Kokha on the young ones and give them blessing.
Kartik 5	Yekadashi	एकादशी	Eleventh day of Dashain where the celebration continues.
Kartik 6	Duwadashi	दुवादशी	The final official consecutive holiday of Dashain celebration.
Kartik 22	Laxmi Puja	लक्ष्मी पुजा	In the morning cows are worshipped. Later, usually during the evenings, Laxmi, Goddess of wealth is worshipped.
Kartik 23	Tihar Holiday	तिहार बिदा	Additional Holiday
Kartik 24	Mha Puja and Govardhan Puja Nepal Sambat new year.	म्ह पुजा	Mostly Mha Puja celebrates by Newari People.
Kartik 25	Bhaitika	भाइ टिका	Sisters and brothers wish for each other's safety and well-being. Gifts are exchanged between them.
Kartik 26	Tihar Holiday	तिहार बिदा	Additional Holiday
Kartik 29	Chhath Parwa	छठ पर्व	A festival dedicated to Hindu Sun God.
Push 9	Yomari Punhi and Jyapu Diwas	याेमारी पुन्हीं	A festival marking the end of the rice harvest.
Push 10	Christmas Day	क्रिसमस डे	Birthday of Jesus Christ.
Poush 15	Tamu Lhosar	तमु ल्हाेसार	New year celebrated by the Gurung Community.
Push 27	Prithvi Jayanti	पृथ्वी जयन्ती	Birthday of Prithvi Narayan Shah.
Magh 1	Maghe Sankranti	माघे संंक्रान्ती	The first day of the month of Magh.
Magh 24	Sonam Lhosar	शाेनाम ल्हाेसार	New Year celebration by the Tamang community.
Fagun 22	Maha Shivaratri	महा शिवरात्री	Celebrated in reverence of Lord Shiva.
Fagun 25	Gyalpo Lhosar	ग्याल्पाे ल्हाेसार	New Year of Tibetan Community.
Chaitra 7	Fagu Purnima	फागु पुर्णिमा	Also known as Holi, the festival of colors. In Terai region of Nepal, this festival is celebrated on the next day.
Chaitra 8	Fagu Purnima	फागु पुर्णिमा	In Tarai Region
Shawwal 1	Eid al-Fitr	इद उल फित्र	End of the month of Ramadan (Festival of Fastbreaking).
Dhu al-Hijjah 10	Eid al-Adha	इद उल अजाहा	"Sacrifice Feast", the willingness of Abraham to sacrifice his son Ishmael.
	Ram Nawami	राम नवमी	Birth date of Lord Ram
	Buddha Jayanti	बुद्द जयन्त्री	Birth date of Lord Gautam Buddha.

== Optional holidays ==
Date	Name		Remarks
Date	English	Nepali	Remarks
Bhadra 13	Gai Jatra	गाइ जात्रा	Holiday only for Newar Community all over Nepal & Bagmati Province
Bhadra 19	Gaura Parwa	गाैरा पर्व	Only in Sudurpashchim Province.
Bhadra 29	Teej	तिज	Only a holiday for women
Ashoj 9	Indra Jatra	इन्द्र जात्रा	Celebrated only in Kathmandu valley, so holiday in Kathmandu Valley only
Ashoj 18	Jeetiya Parwa	जितिया पर्व	Only for Jeetiya Festival celebrating women.
Poush 15	Dura Maipu Nakuma		Dura people
Magh 28	Saraswati Puja	सरस्वती पुजा	Educational institution only.
Chaitra 23	Ghode Jatra	घाेडे जात्रा	Holiday Only in Kathmandu Valley
December 3	International Disabilities Day	अन्तराष्ट्रिय अपांगता दिवस	Holiday for only Disabled Person.
Rabi' al-Awwal 12	Muhammad Jayanti	माेहम्मद जयन्ती	Holiday for only Muslim Community
	Guru Nanak Jayanti	गुरू नानक जयन्ती	Holiday for only Sikh Community
	Falgunanda Jayanti	फाल्गुणन्द जयन्ती	Holiday for only Kirat Community
	Siruwa Parba	सिरूवा पर्व	Only in Jhapa, Morang, Sunsari, Siraha & Saptari districts.
	Bhoto Jatra	भाेटाे देखाउने जात्रा	Only a holiday in Kathmandu Valley

=== Observance holiday ===
Date	Name		Remarks
Date	English	Nepali	Remarks
Jestha 21	Untouchability Abolished Day		
Ashar 29	Bhanu Jayanti	भानु जयन्ती	
Bhadra 22	Civil Service Day		
Bhadra 23	Genz Martyrs Day		
Bhadra 29	Children's Day	बाल दिवस	
June 5	World Environment Day	विश्व वातावरण दिवस	
July 29	International Tiger Day		
December 11	Mountain Day		

== See also ==
- List of festivals in Nepal
