= 2023 in Nepal =

- Decades: 2000s; 2010s; 2020s
- See also: Other events of 2023; Timeline of Nepalese history

Events in the year 2023 in Nepal.

== Incumbents ==
- President:
  - Bidhya Devi Bhandari (until 13 March)
  - Ram Chandra Poudel (since 13 March)
- Vice President:
  - Nanda Kishor Pun (until 20 March)
  - Ram Sahaya Yadav (since 20 March)
- Prime Minister: Pushpa Kamal Dahal
- Chief Justice:
  - Hari Krishna Karki (until 4 August 2023)
  - Bishowambhar Prasad Shrestha (since 22 August 2023)
- Speaker of House of Representatives: Dev Raj Ghimire (since January 19)
- Chairman of National Assembly: Ganesh Prasad Timilsina

=== Provincial Governors ===
- Governor of Bagmati Province: Yadav Chandra Sharma
- Governor of Gandaki Province: Prithvi Man Gurung
- Governor of Karnali Province: Tilak Pariyar
- Governor of Koshi Province: Parshuram Khapung
- Governor of Lumbini Province: Amik Sherchan
- Governor of Madhesh Province: Hari Shankar Mishra
- Governor of Sudurpashchim Province: Dev Raj Joshi

== Events ==
=== January ===
- 1 January – Pokhara International Airport officially begins operations.
- 10 January – Prime Minister Dahal secures a motion of confidence with 268 out of 270 votes in the 275-member House of Representatives.
- 15 January – Yeti Airlines Flight 691: All 72 people on board are killed when a plane crashes in Pokhara, Gandaki province, where it had intended to land at Pokhara International Airport. The plane had departed from Tribhuvan International Airport in Kathmandu.
- 24 January – At least one person is killed and one other is injured by a 5.4 magnitude earthquake in Bajura and Bajhang districts.
- 27 January – Deputy Prime Minister and Minister for Home Affairs, Rabi Lamichhane, is stripped of all his elected positions after the Supreme Court ruled that he did not follow due process while re-obtaining Nepali citizenship after renouncing his American citizenship, and thus, he was not a legal Nepali citizen.

=== February ===
- 5 February – Cabinet ministers from the Rastriya Swatantra Party resign, but the party maintains its support to the government.
- 22 February – A 4.8 magnitude earthquake destroys several houses, a school and two hospitals in Bajura district.
- 25 February – Cabinet ministers from the Rastriya Prajatantra Party resign, and the party withdraws its support to the government.
- 27 February – Cabinet ministers from the CPN (UML) resign, and the party withdraws its support to the government.

=== March ===
- 1 March – Province No. 1 is named Koshi by the provincial assembly, becoming the last of the seven provinces to be named.
- 3 March – The 2023 Martyr's Memorial A-Division League begins.
- 9 March – 2023 Nepalese presidential election: Ram Chandra Poudel of the Nepali Congress is elected 3rd President of Nepal, defeating Subas Chandra Nembang of the CPN (UML).
- 16 March – Nepal secure an automatic berth at the 2023 Cricket World Cup Qualifier, defeating UAE in their final match of the ICC CWC League 2, on the back of winning 11 of their last 12 matches in the tournament.
- 17 March – 2023 Nepalese vice presidential election: Ram Sahaya Yadav of the People's Socialist Party, Nepal is elected 3rd Vice President of Nepal, defeating Asta Laxmi Shakya of the CPN (UML) and Mamata Jha of the Janamat Party.
- 19 March – Free Student Union elections are held in TU-affiliate campuses for the first time in 14 years.
- 20 March – Prime Minister Dahal again secures a vote of confidence with 172 votes in his favor and 89 votes against out of the 262 members present in the 275-member lower house.
- 24 March – Final data of the 12th national census, conducted in 2021, are made public, with the population of the country being 29,164,578.

=== April ===
- 23 April – By-elections to be held in Chitwan–2, Tanahun–1 and Bara–2 seats of the House of Representatives.

=== June ===
- 18 June – One person is killed and 25 others are reported missing after heavy rains cause flash floods across Nepal.
- 19 June – The mayor of the Nepali capital of Kathmandu bans the screenings of Indian films after dialogue in the recent epic film Adipurush stated that Sita from Hindu mythology was born in India instead of Nepal.
- 29th June Supreme Court of Nepal issued an interim order to legalize same sex marriage to Government of Nepal.

=== July ===
- 11 July – Six people are killed when a Manang Air tourist helicopter crashes near Solukhumbu, Koshi Province.

=== September ===
- 29 September - Guinness World Record for "Most Viewers in a Cardiovascular health awareness live stream on Facebook" was achieved by Nepalese cardiologist Dr. Om Murti Anil

=== November ===
- 3 November – 2023 Nepal earthquake: A magnitude 5.6 earthquake strikes Karnali Province, killing at least 132 people and destroying many houses.
- 3 November – 2023 ICC Men's T20 World Cup Asia Qualifier: Nepal qualified for the 2024 ICC Men's T20 World Cup.
- 13 November – Nepal decides to ban TikTok, citing misuse of the app that "disturbs social harmony and disrupts family structures and social relations."
- 23 November 23 – Protesters in Kathmandu call for the "Restoration of the monarchy".
  - Further information: 2023 Nepalese pro-monarchy protest

== Anniversaries ==
- 29 May – 70 years since the first ascent of Mount Everest

== Deaths ==
- 24 January – Gopal Gurung, activist, coordinator of the Save Susta campaign
- 5 February – Himalaya Shumsher J.B. Rana, economist, 1st governor of Nepal Rastra Bank
- 7 February – Karma Ghale, politician, former member of House of Representatives from Nepali Congress party list
- 10 February – Lachhuman Gurung, politician, Chairman of Mahabu rural municipality
- 20 February – Dr. Mathura Prasad Shrestha, public health and civil rights activist, former Minister for Health
- 25 February – Shahnaz Rahman, politician, member of House of Representatives from People's Socialist Party, Nepal party list
- 16 March – Pratap Subba, filmmaker
- 22 March – Damber Singh Gurung, retired footballer
- 24 March – Krishna Tamrakar, radio journalist
