= 2021 Nepal floods =

2021 floods in Nepal

- Location: Nepal
- Cause: Climate change, urbanization near flood plains and poor drainage infrastructure
- Deaths: 133+
- Property damage: Rs2 billion+ {estimated}

2021 Nepal floods were a series of flash floods caused by heavy rains and resultant landslides.

- In June 2021, the Melamchi River flooded, caused damage in the Melamchi Bazar in Sindhupalchowk District of Nepal killing several locals and some foreigners. In the same month, the Mahakali River in Kanchanpur District washed out an under-construction bridge.
- In September 2021, heavy rain inundated 382 houses and roads in Kathmandu. About 105 mm of rainfall occurred in three hours in Kathmandu Valley. On the same week, another flood in Tarai region caused nine deaths and damaged 42 houses.
- In October 2021, a flood in Karnali catchment of western Nepal killed at least 103 people. In the Mahakali River basin, 2600 people were displaced. In eastern Nepal, the rain storm destroyed about 50,000 hectares of paddy plantations. In Palpa district, 535 ha of paddy plantation was damaged. 2232 houses were inundated across Nepal. The domestic airport in Biratnagar was closed for four days due to flooding of the runway. The flood blocked highways at 244 places around Nepal causing damage of about NPR 1 billion.

== See also ==
- May 2012 Nepal floods
- 2019 Nepal floods
- 2020 Nepal floods
- 2021 South Asian floods
- 2024 Nepal floods
