= 2022 in Nepal =

- Decades: 2000s; 2010s; 2020s
- See also: Other events of 2022; Timeline of Nepalese history

Events in the year 2022 in Nepal.

== Incumbents ==
- President: Bidhya Devi Bhandari
- Vice President: Nanda Kishor Pun
- Prime Minister: Sher Bahadur Deuba (until 25 December), Pushpa Kamal Dahal (since 25 December)
- Chief Justice: Cholendra Shumsher Rana
- Speaker of House of Representatives: Agni Sapkota
- Chairman of National Assembly: Ganesh Prasad Timilsina

=== Provincial Governors ===
- Governor of Bagmati Province: Yadav Chandra Sharma
- Governor of Gandaki Province: Prithvi Man Gurung
- Governor of Karnali Province: Tilak Pariyar
- Governor of Koshi Province: Parshuram Khapung
- Governor of Lumbini Province: Amik Sherchan
- Governor of Madhesh Province: Hari Shankar Mishra
- Governor of Sudurpashchim Province: Dev Raj Joshi

== Events ==
=== January ===
- 2 January – Seven people are killed and eight injured in a bus accident in Palpa.

=== February ===
- 20 February – Hundreds of protestors gather outside the Nepalese parliament in Kathmandu to protest a United States grant from the Millennium Challenge Corporation for infrastructure projects, stating the deal undermines Nepal's sovereignty. Several protesters are injured following clashes with police.
- 27 February – Federal Parliament of Nepal’s ratifies the $500 million compact between MCC and the Government of Nepal.

=== May ===
- 29 May – Tara Air Flight 197 crashes resulting in the death of 22 people.

=== June ===
- 17 June – Nepal reports its first suspected case of monkeypox.

=== September ===
- 17 September – Twenty-two people are killed and 10 others are injured by a landslide in Achham.

=== October ===
- 6 October – Sixteen people are killed, and 20 others injured when a bus overturns in Bara District, Nepal, apparently due to speeding.
- 9 October – President Bidya Devi Bhandari tests positive for COVID-19 one day after being hospitalized.
- 12 October – 2022 South Asian floods: At least 33 people are killed during heavy floods, with the Karnali Province being the most affected.

=== November ===
- 9 November – 2022 Nepal earthquake: Six people are killed when a magnitude 5.6 earthquake strikes Sudurpashchim.
- 20 November – 2022 Nepalese general election: Nepalis elect the 275 members of the House of Representatives.

=== December ===
- 23 December – French serial killer Charles Sobhraj, who received a life sentence in Nepal for murdering 12 tourists between 1963 and 1976, and suspected of murdering also 18 other people, is released from prison due to his old age and good behaviour in accordance with a Supreme Court order. He was deported to France and barred from Nepal for ten years.

== Deaths ==
- 19 January – Mohan Prasad Sharma, 87, jurist.
- 15 February – Taranath Sharma, 87, writer and literary critic.
- 23 February – Jayananda Lama, 65, folk singer and actor.
- 24 April – Dimpal Kumari Jha, 42, politician, MP (2013–2017) and Madhesh Province MPA (since 2018).
- 7 July – Shambu Tamang, 70, mountaineer.
- 20 August – Pradeep Giri, 77, politician, MP (1994–1999, since 2018),
- 16 October – Satya Mohan Joshi, 103, author and cultural historian
- 17 October – Om Gurung, 69, sociologist.
