= Landslide damming (Nepal) =

Type of natural disaster in Nepal

Landslides are triggered in Nepal due to a combination of steep mountains and unstable soils. The risk of the landslide is high in the monsoon season due to the lubrication of soil in the slope by moisture. Another important factor triggering the landslide is earthquakes. When landslide occurs near the river, it can block the river causing a damming effect. Damming could also occur due to rock-slides. Such dams are unstable and can cause flooding if not breached in controlled manner. Below is a list of dams formed due to landslides and their impacts in Nepal Annually, 593 natural disaster occurs in average and quite a few of them are related to the damming by landslides and about 13% of fatality is directly related to the landslide and Landslides Dammed Outburst Flood (LDOF).

== List of landslide dams ==
- 1988 September, Myagdi river: The rockslide in Darbang region of Myagdi river killed 109 people and dammed the river.
- 2012 May, Seti River: The location of dam is about 25 km from Pokhara. The flash flood killed 71 people.
- 2014, Sunkoshi River: 2014 Sunkoshi blockage
- 2015 : The landslide of April 2015 blocked Tom river in Mansalu region.
- 2015, Kaligandaki river: 27 houses were buried and river was dammed for 16 hours by Baseri landslide. The river opened the channel without major damage.
- 2015, Marshyangi river: Gogane landslide blocked the river to accumulate about 150,000 m3 of water. The river opened up naturally.
- 2016, July, Bhotekoshi River: A GLOF event occurred in Tibet triggering flood in Bhotekoshi
- 2016, July, Tamor River: Rockfall blocked the river in Sawadin VDC near Mitlung Bazzar. The obstruction formed a lake about 500 metres long and 200 metres wide.
- 2017, April, Arun River: Nine houses were inundated near Bhotkhola in Sankhuwasabha.
- 2018, September, Badigad river: The river was blocked for 6 hours in Bhimgithe. The dam opened up naturally without threat of flooding.
- 2018, August, Budhi Ganga River: The river was partially blocked in the banks near Dwari in Budiganga Municipality. No full blockage occurred.
- 2020 June, Arun river: The landslide dammed the river forming a lake that was nearly 40 metres wide and height of 5–10 m. The river started breaking naturally.

== See also ==
Natural disasters in Nepal
