= 2021 in Nepal =

- Decades: 2000s; 2010s; 2020s
- See also: Other events of 2021; Timeline of Nepalese history

Events in the year 2021 in Nepal.

== Incumbents ==
- President : Bidhya Devi Bhandari
- Vice President : Nanda Kishor Pun
- Prime Minister : KP Sharma Oli (till 13 July); Sher Bahadur Deuba (from 13 July)
- Chief Justice : Cholendra Shumsher JB Rana
- Speaker of House of Representatives : Agni Sapkota
- Chairman of National Assembly : Ganesh Prasad Timilsina

=== Provincial Governors ===
- Governor of Bagmati Province: Bishnu Prasad Prasain (until 20 August), Yadav Chandra Sharma (starting 20 August)
- Governor of Gandaki Province:
  - until 3 May: Amik Sherchan
  - 3 May-27 July: Sita Kumari Poudel
  - starting 27 July: Prithvi Man Gurung
- Governor of Karnali Province: Govinda Prasad Kalauni (until 9 November), Tilak Pariyar (starting 9 November)
- Governor of Koshi Province: Somnath Adhikari (until 11 November), Parshuram Khapung (starting 11 November)
- Governor of Lumbini Province: Dharmanath Yadav (until 27 July), Amik Sherchan (starting 27 July)
- Governor of Madhesh Province:
  - until 19 February: Tilak Pariyar
  - 19 February-17 August: Rajesh Jha
  - starting 19 August: Hari Shankar Mishra
- Governor of Sudurpashchim Province:
  - until 3 May: Sharmila Kumari Panta
  - 3 May-9 November: Ganga Prasad Yadav
  - starting 9 November: Dev Raj Joshi

== Events ==
=== January ===
- January 1 - The President calls for winter session of parliament to begin. Only the National Assembly meets as the House of Representatives was dissolved on 20 December 2020.
- January 10 - The President ends the winter session of parliament. The National Assembly was in session for only 10 days.
- January 16 - The first winter ascent of K2 by 10 Nepalis.

=== February ===
- February 23 - The Supreme Court reinstates the dissolved House of Representatives.

=== March ===
- March 7 - The Supreme Court annuls the decision of the Election Commission to grant the name Nepal Communist Party (NCP) to the party created by the merger of Communist Party of Nepal (Unified Marxist–Leninist) and Communist Party of Nepal (Maoist Centre) and positions them to their pre merger status.

=== April ===
- April 14 - Nepali New Year, Bikram Sambat 2078 begins.
- April 24 - The replica of Bhimsen Tower is inaugurated. The original tower was destroyed in the April 2015 Nepal earthquake

=== May ===
- May 9 - Prithvi Subba Gurung, Chief Minister of Gandaki Province resigns ahead of a no confidence vote scheduled for May 10.
- May 10 - Prime Minister Oli fails to obtain vote of confidence in parliament. He obtains only 93 votes in favor while a faction within his own party boycotts the vote.
- May 13 - KP Sharma Oli is re-appointed prime minister by the President per the provision of Article 76(3) of the constitution. Opposition parties did not claim majority leading to his appointment as the leader of the largest party in parliament.

=== June ===
- June 4 and June 10 - PM KP Sharma Oli expands and reshuffles cabinet resulting with 14 members from CPN(UML) and 11 from Mahantha Thakur faction of PSP-N.
- June 5 - Nepali Congress joins the government of Karnali Province.
- June 9 - Nepali Congress joins the government of Province No. 2.
- June 11 - Krishna Chandra Nepali Pokharel of Nepali Congress is sworn in as the second chief-minister of Gandaki.
- June 22 - Supreme Court issues an interim order annulling the cabinet expansion of June 4 and June 10 by Prime Minister Oli. The order relieves 20 ministers of their positions with the cabinet now composed of only four ministers.

=== July ===
- July 12 - Supreme Court reinstates the dissolved House of Representatives and issues an order to appoint Sher Bahadur Deuba as Prime Minister per provision of Article 76(5) of the constitution.
- July 13 - Sher Bahadur Deuba from NC takes oath of office as the prime minister for a fifth term.
- July 27 - Prithvi Man Gurung and Amik Sherchan are appointed governor of Gandaki and Lumbini provinces, respectively.

=== August ===
- August 12 - Kul Prasad KC becomes chief minister of Lumbini Province after a power sharing agreement between Nepali Congress and CPN (Maoist Centre).
- August 17 - Hari Shankar Mishra appointed Governor of Province No. 2.
- August 18 -
  - Ashta Laxmi Shakya becomes first women chief minister of any province in Nepal, heading the Bagmati provincial government.
  - Two national parties split on same day:
    - The largest party in parliament, CPN (UML) split to form CPN (Unified Socialist) led by former prime minister Madhav Kumar Nepal.
    - PSP-N split to form Loktantrik Samajbadi Party Nepal led by Mahantha Thakur. Now, there are 6 national parties in Nepal.

=== November ===
- November 11 - 2021 Nepal census begins.
- November 14 - A massive avalanche occurred in Mount Manapathi in Mustang district.

== Deaths ==
- January 14 — Dinesh Chandra Yadav
- March 26 – Nabindra Raj Joshi
- May 5 – Prem Dhoj Pradhan
- May 24 — Banira Giri
- May 19 — Khadgajeet Baral
- June 1 – Ujwal Thapa
- July 21 — Uttam Nepali
