= List of deadliest traffic accidents in Nepal =

This is list of deadliest traffic accidents in Nepal.

== List ==
=== 1900s ===
- 1979 Banepa accident: In October 1979, a bus fell off 200 feet from a mountain cliff killing 6 and injuring 23 at Banepa.
- 1988 Thada accident: In January 1988, a bus fell more than 1,600 feet, killing 7 and injuring 10.
- 1988 Kathmandu accident: On Mar 1988 a bus fell off a cliff, killing 18.
- 1990 Trishuli accident: In January 1990, a bus collided with another bus and plunged into a river killing 25 people including two Americans and a Belgian.
- 1993 Sunsari accident: In July 1993, a bus lost control after the tire burst at Sunsari and crashed into the canal killing 20 and injuring 18.
- 1994 Gulmi accident: In May 1994, a bus fell off a mountain highway in Gulmi killing 22 people and injuring 24.
- 1994 Pokhara accident: In August 1994, a bus fell 10 meters down killing 8 and injuring 15.
- 1995 Trishuli accident: In February 1995, a bus fell into river killing 43 and injuring 22.
- 1996 Mahendranagar accident: In November 1996, a passenger bus fell 100 m off a mountain highway killing 15 people and injuring 22 others. The bus was traveling from Mahendranagar and Singudi.

=== 2000s ===
- 2002 Trishuli accident: In February 2002, a night bus plunged into the Trishuli river, killing 41.
- 2003 Surkhet accident: In September 2003, a bus fell 80 metres off the Surkhet-Salyan road in Salyan district into Bheri River killing 43 and injuring 19.
- 2004 Baglung accident: In September 2004, a bus plunged into the river killing 14 and injuring 4 Israelis and 1 Austrian tourists.
- 2005 Badarmude bus explosion: It was a terrorist attack by the Moaist Communist Party of Nepal because the bus was transporting troops of Nepal Army. 38 people died in the event."
- 2005 Pyuthan accident: In January 2005, a bus fell 100m in a ravine killing 42 and injuring 17.
- 2006 Jalbire accident: In July 2006, a bus fell off a mountain road and plunged into Jalbire river killing 22.
- 2007 Kurenghat accident: In February 2007, a bus fell into Trishuli river at Kurenghat, killing 13.
- 2007 Deurali accident: In August 2007, a bus fell off a mountainous road, killing 19 people.
- 2008 Rapti accident: In May 2008, a bus carrying 100 passengers fell in Rapti river killing 36, including pilgrims from India.
- 2008 Madhavbesi accident: In September 2008, a bus fell into Trishuli river at Mahadevbesi of Dhading district, killing 14 including 2 Indians.
- 2008 Mukundapur school bus accident: In December 2008, a school bus skidded off a bridge, killing 20 students and 2 teachers near Mukundapur village.
- 2009 Kaski accident: In December 2009, a bus fell from road, killing 10 and injuring 24 at Kaski district.
- 2009 Bhotekoshi accident: In September 2009, a bus plunged 40 metres into the Bhotekoshi River, killing 20.

=== 2010s ===
- 2010 Haripur accident: In April 2010, a bus skid off the road at Sunsari district, killing 5 and injuring 55.
- 2010 Kittu accident: In March 2010, a bus fell off the Kalikot-Surkhet highway into the Karnali River at Kittu village, killing 18.
- 2011 Sunkoshi accident: On 13 October 2011, a bus fell off a cliff into the Sunkoshi River in Sindhuli District, killing 41 and injuring 16.
- 2012 July Parasi accident: On 15 July 2012,a bus fell into an irrigation canal near Parasi, killing 39.
- 2013 January Chaatiwan accident: A bus veered off a narrow mountain road during thick fog in Chhatiwan, killing 29 and injuring 12.
- 2014 Doti accident: On 6 October 2014, a bus plummeted some 300 m (980 ft) down a road in Doti, killing 41.
- 2015 Kathmandu accident: On 22 April 2015, a bus fell off a hill near Kathmandu, killing 17 Indian tourist and injuring 30.
- 2016 Nuwakot accident: On 6 February, a bus fell off a cliff and into a ravine on the Pasang Lhamu Highway in Nuwakot District, killing 11 and injuring 12.
- 2016 Nepal bus crashes: A passenger bus left Kathmandu on the morning of 15 August 2016, en route to Madan Kundari 89 kilometres (55 mi) away in Kavrepalanchok District in central Nepal. Many were survivors of the Nepalese earthquakes of April 2015 and May 2015.
- 2017 Trishuli accident: On 28 October a bus carrying passengers returning from a Hindu festival skidded off the Prithvi Highway and plunged into a river, killing 31.
- 2018 Tulsipur accident: On 21 December a bus veered off a highway in Tulsipur and plunged into a river, killing 21 and injuring 15.
- 2019 Sindhupalchowk accident: On 15 December a bus carrying Hindu pilgrims veered off a highway in Sindhupalchowk and crashed, killing 14 and injuring 18.

=== 2020s ===
- 2021 Mugu accident: On 12 October, a bus carrying 45 passengers fell into a river in Mugu District, killing 28 and injuring 12.
- 2022 Bara accident:On 6 October a bus overturned in Bara District, killing 16 and injuring 20.
- 2022 Chedagad accident: On 12 December a truck carrying wedding guests veered off a mountain highway in Chedagad, killing all 12 aboard.
- 2022 Bethanchowk accident: On December, a bus bumped the side wall of a mountainous road in Bethanchowk, killing 17 and injuring 22.
- 2024 Abu Khaireni accident: On 23 August, a bus carrying Indian pilgrims fell from the Prithvi Highway into the Marshyangdi River near Anbu Khaireni, killing 27 and injuring 16.
- 2024 Madan Ashrit Highway disaster: The road accident occurred on 12 July 2024, that was caused by a large landslide that pushed two buses carrying a total of 65 passengers on the Madan Ashrit Highway into the Trishuli River in Nepal.
