= 1988 Darbang rockslide =

Rockslide in Nepal

At 11:00 p.m. on 20 September 1988, a huge rockslide occurred in the Darbang region of Nepal. The landslide killed 109 people and buried all the houses in the right bank of the river. The volume of landslide was estimated to be about 5 million cubic meters with a dimension of about 750m high ranging from the elevation of 1750 to 1000 m and width of 500m. The debris dammed the Myagdi river for three hours. The debris was gradually eroded by the river without causing flooding in the downstream region.

The cause of slide is not known clearly because there was no rainfall in the area during the landslide period or any earthquake. However, about a month earlier, an earthquake of 6.7 Richter scale had occurred in eastern Nepal. About 62 years earlier, a similar landslide killed about 500 people in the same region.
