= Badarmude bus explosion =

Terrorist attack in Southern Nepal in 2005

- Location of attack within Nepal
- Location: 27.43°N 84.34°E; Badarmude village, Chitwan district, Nepal
- Date: June 6, 2005; 07.45 AM (NST)
- Target: Civilians
- Weapon: Land mine
- Deaths: 38 dead (some sources say 53)
- Injuries: 71
- Perpetrator: CPN(Maoist)

The Badarmude bus explosion was a terrorist attack on a civilian commuter coach in Southern Nepal near the village of Badarmude on June 6, 2005.

== Overview ==
The bus was a regular coach, which are common in Nepal for transporting local people around the Himalayan mountains. The bus was travelling its usual route to the stop in the rural town of Badarmude 175 km south of Kathmandu with at least 120 passengers on board and on the roof at the time of the attack.

As the bus crossed a small wooden bridge over a mountain stream, a member of a terrorist organisation detonated a small bomb from his position 250m away behind a tree. The bomb was not large enough to seriously damage the bus on its own, but did succeed in collapsing the fragile bridge into the stream below, taking the bus with it. Parts of the bus and its passengers littered the banks stream and remains of the bridge, and injured people requiring immediate medical assistance were scattered throughout the wreckage.

Local people provided the most immediate relief, but army officials were hampered in organising a proper rescue operation, due to the remote nature of the terrain. The eventual report stated that there were 38 dead (some sources say 53), and 71 injured, some of them very seriously, including those requiring amputation and lengthy hospitalisation.

The attack has not been claimed, but was almost certainly the work of the Communist Party of Nepal, fervent Maoists, who have been fighting the Nepal Civil War against the monarchy since 1996 . Their great opponent in King Gyanendra has recently stepped up attacks on their positions and a crackdown on their supporters, following his reinstatement of absolute monarchy in Nepal following mild democratic reforms.

The CPN does not have a history of attacking purely civilian targets, and previous assaults on buses have either been because the bus was transporting troops, or had been violating strikes ordered by the CPN. Neither was the case here, and the cause of the attack remains unknown. It is regarded as a terrorist attack by Maoists and was called by Pushpa Kamal Dahal as “the biggest mistake of the civil war." The Maoists were heavily criticized for this and nobody was ever held liable.

== See also ==
- List of road accidents
- List of deadliest traffic accidents in Nepal
