= May 2012 Nepal floods =

Natural disaster in Nepal

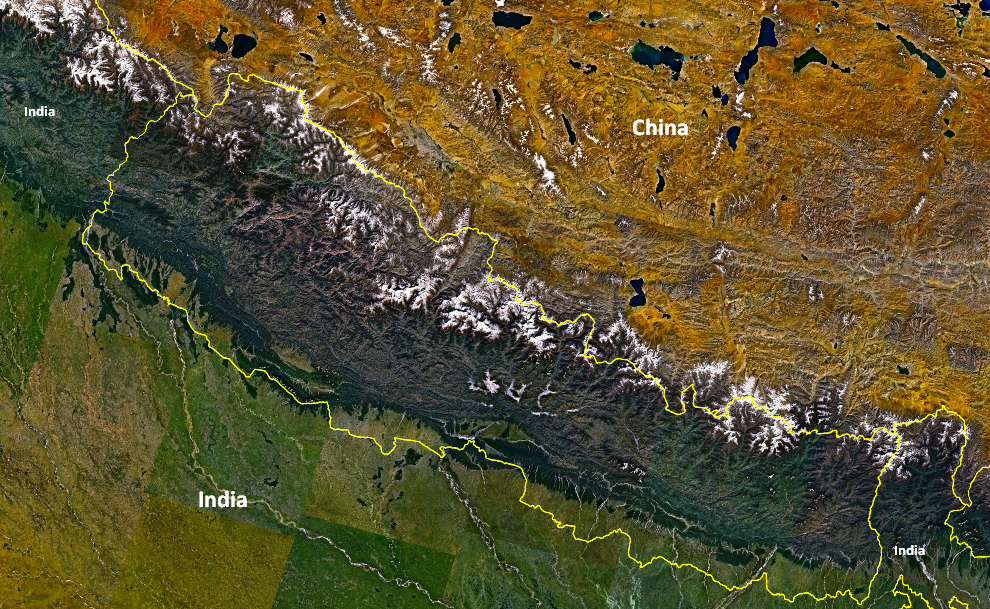
- Location of Nepal
- Location: Pashchimānchal (especially the Gandaki Zone)
- Cause: Landslide and poor drainage infrastructure
- Deaths: At least 34 killed
- Property damage: unknown

Nepal was hit by serious flooding in May 2012.

The floods are thought to have been caused by waters of the Seti building near its source, high above the snowline, during days of rain and then suddenly bursting free. The flooding was worst in the western part of the country. Two villages were especially badly hit when water surged down the Seti river because of a landslide. Officials say that rocks, earth and other debris blocked the river and caused flash flooding.

== Event ==
On 5 May 2012, a landslide occurred near Machapuchare mountain in north-central Nepal. The landslide flowed into the Seti River, causing a flash flood that reached 9.1 m (30 ft) deep. There were at least 34 deaths from the floods.

== Damages ==
The UN says that houses, temples and community buildings were completely swept away in the villages of Kharapani and Sardikhola when the floods struck. The floodwaters also swept into the city of Pokhara, where several people were swept away along with their houses and livestock. Power and water supplies were cut to many areas, and roads were washed away. Further damage was caused to crops and to other infrastructure.

== Authorities reaction ==
Prime Minister Baburam Bhattarai flew to the area on 6 May 2012 and told the villagers the government had given top priority to the rescue and recovery. He also announced that the families of those killed would get 100,000 rupees (US$1,160) as immediate relief, and those who have lost their homes would receive 25,000 rupees (US$300).

The Nepal Army and Police are taking part in rescue efforts in the area. The local administration in the Kaski area has issued an alert asking people to move away from the river area.

== See also ==
- 2019 Nepal floods
- 2020 Nepal floods
- 2021 Nepal floods
- 2024 Nepal floods
