= Madan Ashrit Highway disaster =

Landslide that pushed two buses into a Nepalese river

- Date: July 12, 2024
- Time: c. 3:30 a.m. (NST)
- Location: Chitwan District, Nepal
- Cause: Mountain landslide triggered by monsoon rains
- Deaths: 19+
- Injuries: 3
- Missing: 40

The Madan Ashrit Highway disaster was a road accident on July 12, 2024 that was caused by a large landslide that pushed two buses carrying a total of 65 passengers on the Madan Ashrit Highway into the Trishuli River in Nepal. The disaster left at least 19 people dead, injured three people and left 40 others missing.

== Background ==
The monsoon season in Nepal causes significant rainfall to fall from June to September annually, causing mountainous landslides and increased river water levels. Landslides in Nepal during the 24-hour period prior to the accident killed seventeen people.

The Madan Ashrit Highway or NH44 is the busiest international roadway link in Nepal. It carries roughly 20,000 vehicles daily, accounting for about 90% of international traffic. One of the buses was driving roughly 41 passengers from Nepalese capital Kathmandu to Guar, and was operated by Ganapati Deluxe. The second bus was driving roughly 24 passengers from Birgunj to Kathmandu, and was operated by Angel Deluxe. The Angel Deluxe bus was carrying seven Indian nationals.

== Disaster ==
At around 3:30 am local time, a large landslide struck the two buses as they were driving on the Narayanghat-Mugling road section in the Chitwan district, pushing them into the flooded Trishuli River at least 100 feet from the road which swept the buses downstream. The buses were pushed through concrete barriers before rolling down a steep embankment next to the river. Three passengers on the Ganapati Deluxe bus were able to jump out of the vehicle and swim to stable ground before locals took them to a hospital for treatment.

One victim was recovered about 50 km (31 miles) downstream of the landslide. By 18 July, at least 19 bodies had been recovered, including one that was recovered 100 kilometers away near the border with India. At least seven of the fatalities were identified as Indian nationals.

A third bus was struck by a different landslide on a nearby section of the same highway, killing the driver with further details on casualties currently unknown.

== Response ==
Prime Minister of Nepal Pushpa Kamal Dahal issued rescue directives to all governmental agencies and mobilized over 500 rescue personnel to the site of the accident to search for survivors, including members of the Armed Police Force and a Nepali Army diving team. Rescue efforts were delayed by persistently heavy rainfall and high Trishuli River water levels, as well as by widespread debris caused by other landslides in the region. One-way traffic was reopened after debris was cleared from the highway.

Rescuers were unable to find traces of debris from the buses or any additional survivors by late morning, in part due to heavy rainfall and fast mountainous river flow turning its waters more opaque. The Nepalese government issued a ban on nighttime road travel by passenger buses in regions where weather alerts were issued. Rescue workers were forced to temporarily cease rescue operations in the evening due to the darkness further complicating search efforts.

On 13 July, rescue workers recovered the first victim, prompting them to open up the search area to the southern location of where the victim was found.

On 11 January 2026, one of the bus's front wheel arch was discovered under the sand.

== See also ==
- 2014 Sunkoshi blockage
- 2021 Mount Manapathi avalanche
- 2021 Melamchi flood
