= Republic Day (Nepal) =

National holiday of Nepal

Flag of Nepal

Republic Day (Nepali: गणतन्त्र दिवस) is a national holiday in Nepal. It commemorates the date on which the first meeting of the Constituent Assembly of Nepal took place on 28 May 2008, which ended the 240-year reign of the Shah kings and declared Nepal a republic. The establishment of the republic put an end to the civil war that lasted for over a decade. According to the Nepali calendar, the republic day is marked on Jestha 15 every year. Celebrations include a military parade in Kathmandu and several small-scale programs organised by various government agencies across the country.

== History of Republic Day ==
Modern Nepal came into existence in 1768. The prime minister and other government positions were made hereditary and the monarch had no real power. Dissatisfaction with the Rana regime led to the 1951 revolution which ended the Rana oligarchy. The country was a constitutional monarchy after the end of the Rana rule, but in 1960, King Mahendra suspended the constitution, assuming absolute power under the Panchayat regimen . After the People's Movement in 1990 that brought an end to the Panchayat, constitutional monarchy was reestablished and King Birendra brought about several democratic reforms.

In 1991, an elected government was formed for the first time in 32 years. However, the new government's policy led to an economic crisis. The Maoist revolution that began in the early 1990s eventually transformed into a full-scale civil war. The Democracy movement in 2006, resulting from the seven party alliance, brought the civil war to an end and spearheaded the Maoists into mainstream politics. The Constituent Assembly was elected in 2008, ending the monarchy and successively, the Federal Democratic Republic of Nepal was declared as a parliamentary republic.

== Celebrations ==
The main Republic Day celebration is held in the national capital, Kathmandu at the Sainik Manch, Tundikhel. Ceremonious parades take place at Tundikhel, which are performed as a tribute to the country; its unity in diversity and rich cultural heritage.

The government of Nepal had declared a public holiday to commemorate this day. But since 2019, the public holiday has been cut off, yet the day is celebrated by organising various programs at workplaces.

== See also ==
- History of Nepal
- Public holidays in Nepal
