= 2020 Nepal floods =

2020 floods in Nepal

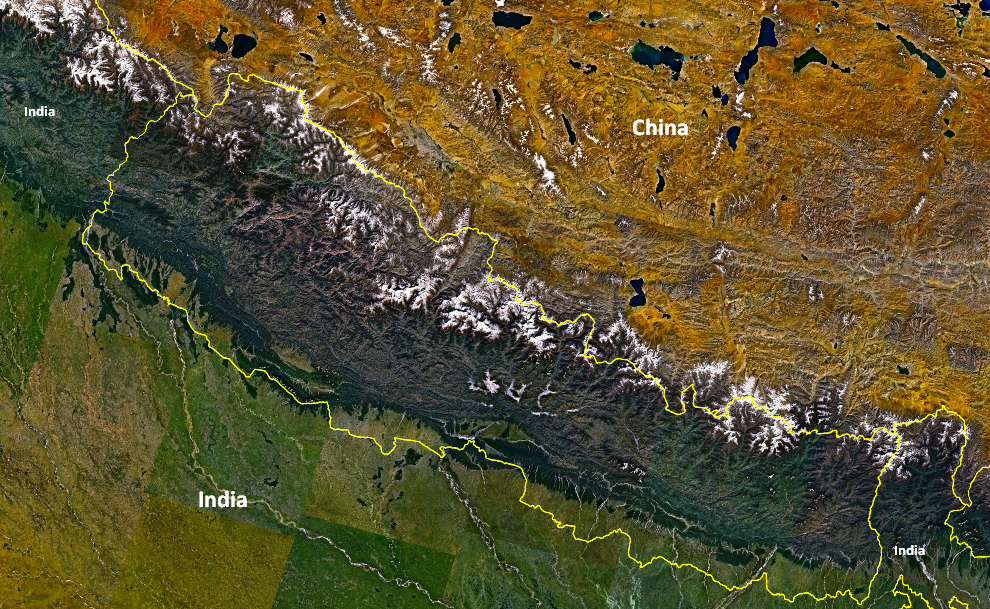
- Location of Nepal
- Date: June–September 2020
- Location: Western Nepal, in particular Myagdi District
- Cause: Climate change and poor drainage infrastructure
- Deaths: 401

The 2020 Nepal floods were induced by heavy rains causing landslides and flash floods in western Nepal, and in particular Myagdi District. As of 24 June, Nepal's Ministry of Home Affairs reported 132 dead, 53 missing, and 128 injured in 445 flooding and landslide incidents. Aon reported 401 fatalities from the floods.

Following the floods, Nepal's water minister Barshaman Pun instructed his officials to raise flood mitigation in the Nepal-India Joint Committee on Inundation and Flood Management (JCIFM) forum.

The Kathmandu Post labelled the rainy season as one of the deadliest in recent memory, writing that the large losses are a result of failure by local and national government.

== See also ==
- May 2012 Nepal floods
- 2019 Nepal floods
- 2021 Nepal floods
- 2020 South Asian floods
- 2024 Nepal floods
