= 2021 Melamchi flood =

Disaster in Nepal

- Date: 2021
- Location: Nepal
- Type: flooding
- Deaths: 21
- Injuries: unknown
- Missing: 3
- Rs1 billion+ {estimated} losses

In June 2021, the flood in Melamchi River caused damage in the Melamchi Bazar in Sindhupalchowk District of Nepal killing several locals and some foreigners

== Cause ==
Based on the early research, the loose material on the upstream part of the Melamchi River activated due to the long monsoon rain. Sindhupalchowk being one of the most affected districts in 2015 earthquake, it is suggested that the mountain relaxation activated the debris flow. The continuous rainfall triggered numerous landslides around Melamchi. Melamchi River was blocked by one of the landslides for few hours creating Landslide dam. This dam burst generating flash flood with mix of debris mixture with sand, boulders and wood fragments.

The local authority issued a warning after sensing the river damming and locals were instructed to move up to higher ground. The flood hit the Melamchi bazar at night after 8 or 9 pm.

== Damage ==
The public infrastructures mainly roads networks, bridges, electricity transmission and structures were damaged by the flood. The preliminary study estimated loss of 260 households, displacing 600 people.

Three foreigners - two Chinese and one Indian died in the incident along with 18 Nepalese. Other two Indians and one Chinese were missing.

== Response ==
Nepal Army, Armed Police Force, and Nepal Police jointly conducted search and rescue operation in the flood damaged zone. The rescue operation faced difficulties due to the thick layer of mud deposited by the flood.

== Flood on July ==
On July 31, 2021, another flood was recorded that swept about 55 houses in Kiul, Chanaute and Galyamthum.

== See also ==
- Landslide dam
- Landslide damming (Nepal)
- Natural disasters in Nepal
