= Karma Ghale =

Nepali politician (1964–2023)

- कर्मा घले

Member of Parliament, Pratinidhi Sabha for Nepali Congress party list
- In office 4 March 2018 – 7 February 2023

Personal details
- Born: 31 January 1964
- Died: 7 February 2023 (aged 59)
- Party: Nepali Congress
- Spouse: Sumitra Ghale
- Children: 3
- Parents: Bhujung Ghale (father); Yankhu Ghale (mother)

Karma Ghale (31 January 1964 – 7 February 2023) was a Nepali politician who was a member of the House of Representatives of the federal parliament of Nepal. He was elected under the proportional representation system from Nepali Congress, filling the reserved seat for indigenous groups. He was also a member of the Women and Social Welfare Committee of the House. In the parliamentary shadow cabinet of Nepali Congress, the main opposition party, he was a member of the Ministry of Industry, Commerce and Supplies.

Ghale died from prostate cancer on 7 February 2023, at the age of 59.
