= Suryachaur =

Suryachaur सुर्यचौर
- Viewpoint
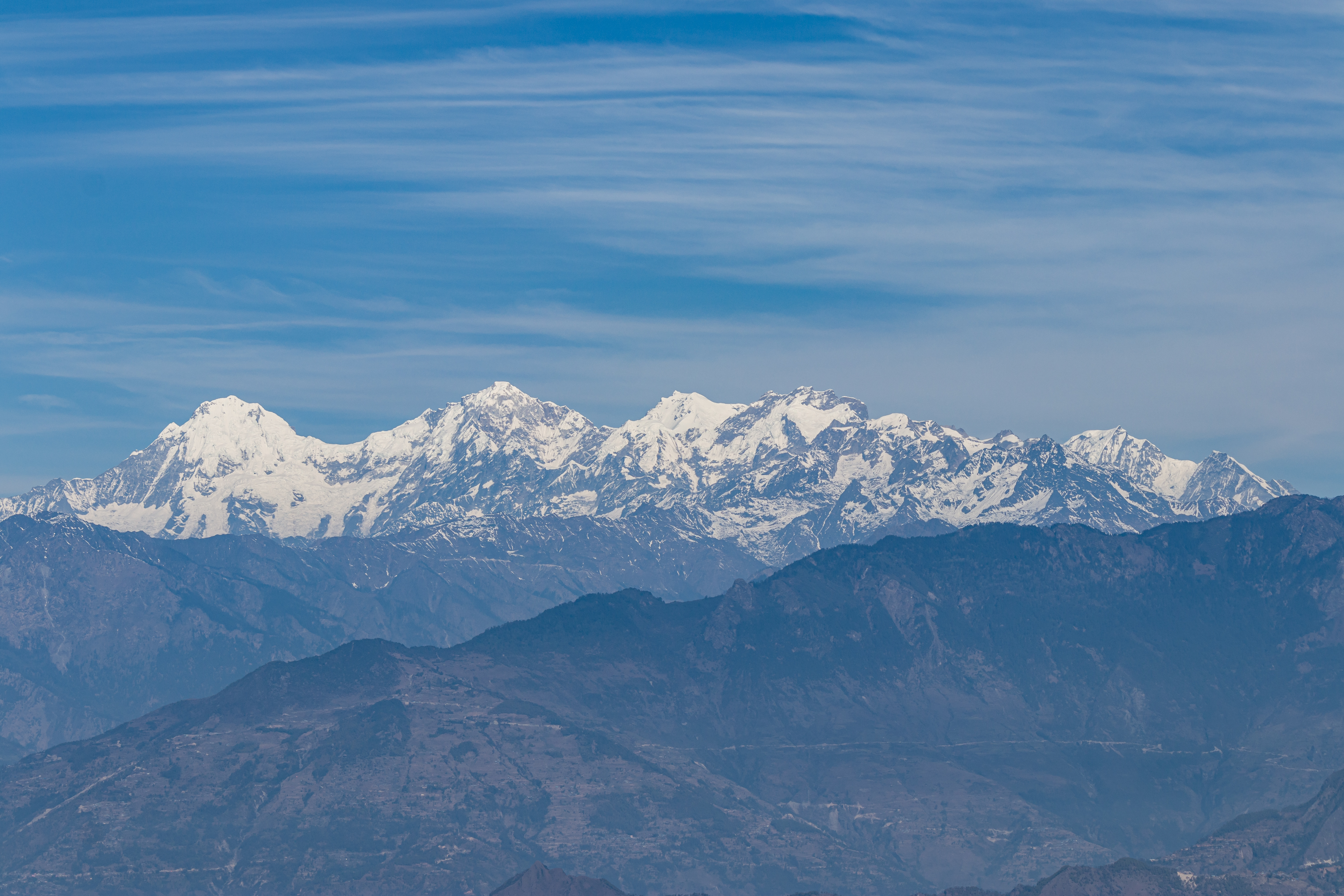
- View from Suryachaur, you can see the Ganesh Himal range from here

- Location in Nepal
- Coordinates: 27.8232055°N 85.3105702°E
- Country: Nepal
- Province: Bagmati Province
- District: Nuwakot District
- Elevation: 1,970 m (6,460 ft)
- Time zone: UTC+5:45 (Nepal Time)

Suryachaur is a Hill station to see the Langtang Himalayan Range as well as entire Likhu Valley of Nuwakot District in Bagmati Province of central Nepal.

Surya chaur is a Nice view point of the chain of Mountain range like Mt Manaslu 8153 meter, Ganesh Himal, Mt Langtang Lirung, Mt Dorje Lhakpa and holy Gaurishankar.

Located within Shivapuri Nagarjun National Park near Kathmandu, the hiking area is accessible via the historic settlement of Tokha. Visitors entering the national park must pay an entry fee at the checkpost. The trail can be accessed either on foot or by vehicle, though additional entry fees apply for vehicles.

People from Kathmandu often go there to enjoy nature and vacation. There is a primary school and small village. Suryachaur is near Gurje Bhanjyang.

== Road to Suryachaur ==
There is a black top road to Gurje Bhanjyang which goes to Nuwakot and Rasuwa. Gurje Bhanjyang is the place where the Shivapuri Nagarjun National Park check post is located. There is Nepal Army security camp for the National park. The drive is about 1 Hour From Samakhusi Chowk Kathmandu.

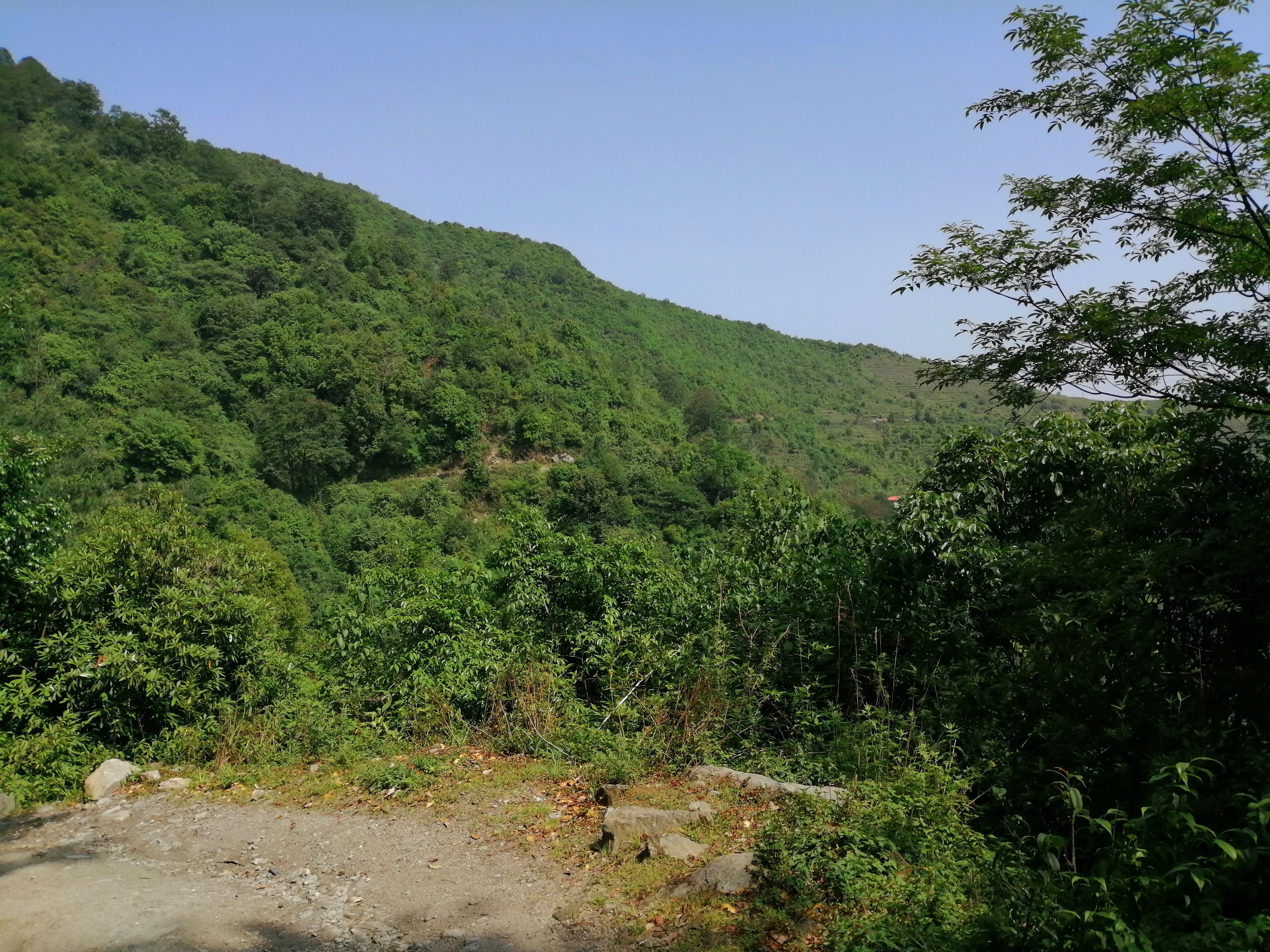
On the way to Suryachaur from Kathmandu

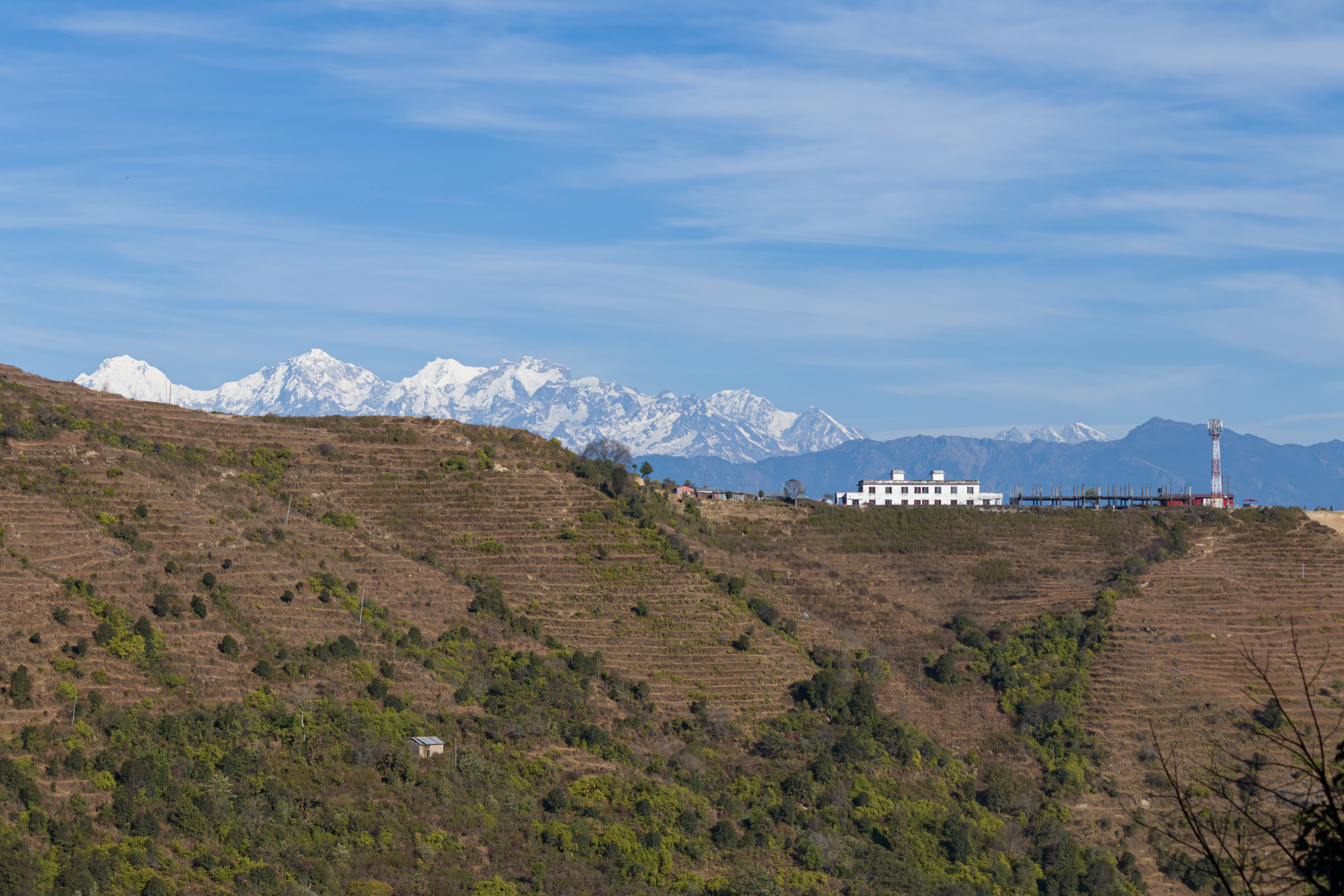
View of Suryachaur with Ganesh Himal behind

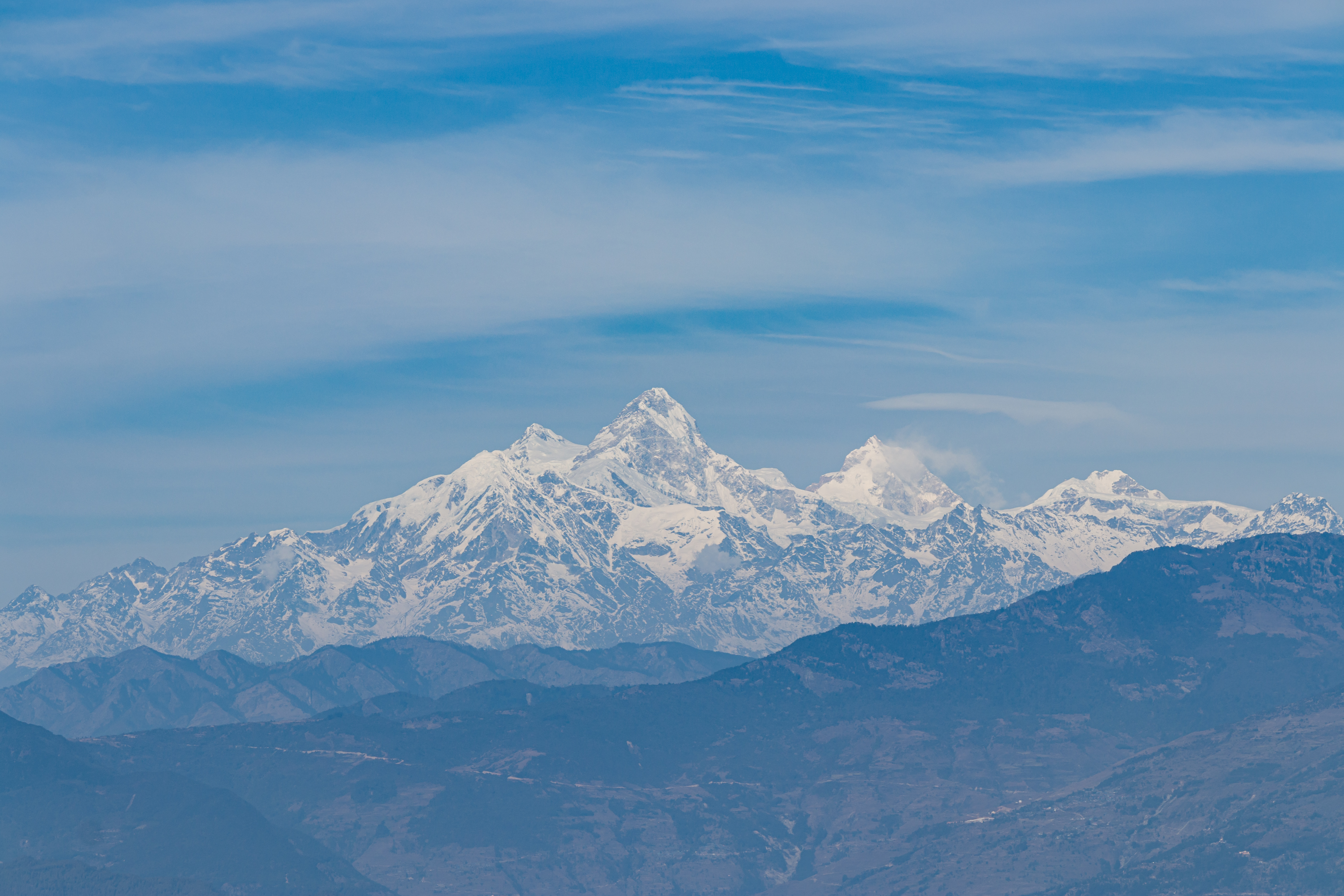
Himalchuli (center) and Manaslu (right) from Suryachaur

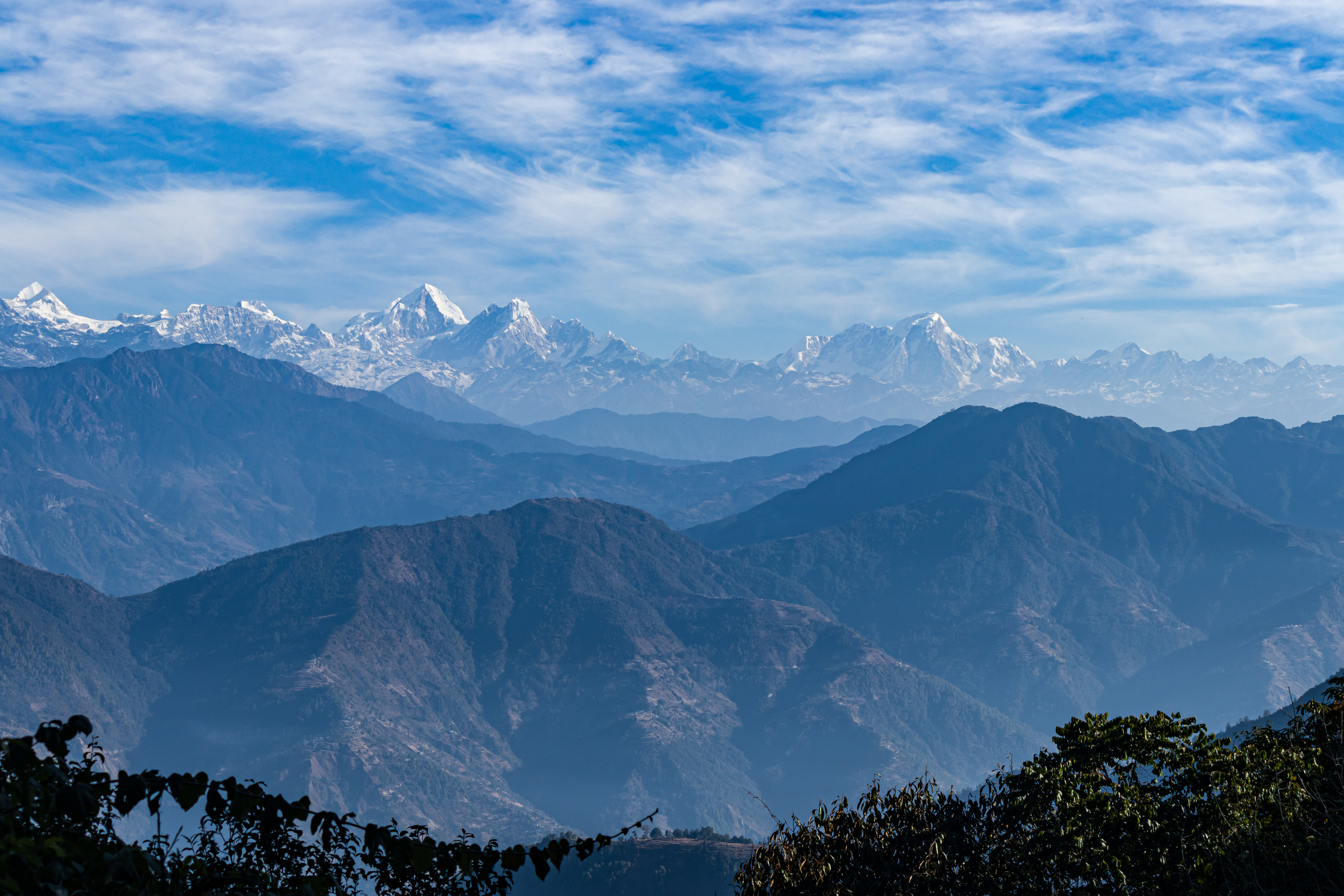
Gangchempo (left), Dorje Lhakpa (center) and Phurbi Chhyachu (right) from Suryachaur
