= Om Gurung =

Nepalese academic (1953–2022)

Professor Dr. Om Gurung
- ओम गुरुङ
- Born: 11 February 1953; Nepal
- Died: 17 October 2022 (aged 69); Harisiddhi, Lalitpur District, Nepal

Om Gurung (11 February 1953 – 17 October 2022; also known as Om Prasad Gurung) was a Nepalese sociologist.

== Education ==
Gurung obtained his PhD from Cornell University in 1996. His dissertation was titled Customary systems of natural resource management among Tarami Magars of Western Nepal.

== Career ==
He was head of the Central Department of Sociology/Anthropology of the Tribhuvan University of Nepal. He also served as the chairman of the Nepal Federation of Indigenous Nationalities (NEFIN)—the umbrella organization of various Indigenous groups in the country—and has been actively involved in indigenous identity politics.

== Death ==
At one stage, he was suffering from severe kidney failure. Doctors suggested transplanting his kidney as soon as possible but at first there was a lack of potential compatible donor. Then it was transplanted about a decade ago. Gurung died from cancer in Lalitpur District, Nepal, on 17 October 2022, at the age of 69.

== Bibliography ==
- Gurung, O. (2009). Social inclusion: Policies and practices in Nepal. Occasional papers in sociology and anthropology, 11, 1–15.
- Gurung, A., Gurung, O. P., & Oh, S. E. (2011). The potential of a renewable energy technology for rural electrification in Nepal: A case study from Tangting. Renewable Energy, 36(11), 3203–3210.
- Gurung, O. (2019). Social inclusion/exclusion: Policy discourse in Nepal. Including the excluded in South Asia: Power, politics and policy perspectives from the region, 39–55.
