= Myagdi Khola =

Coordinates: 28.3401°N 83.5684°E

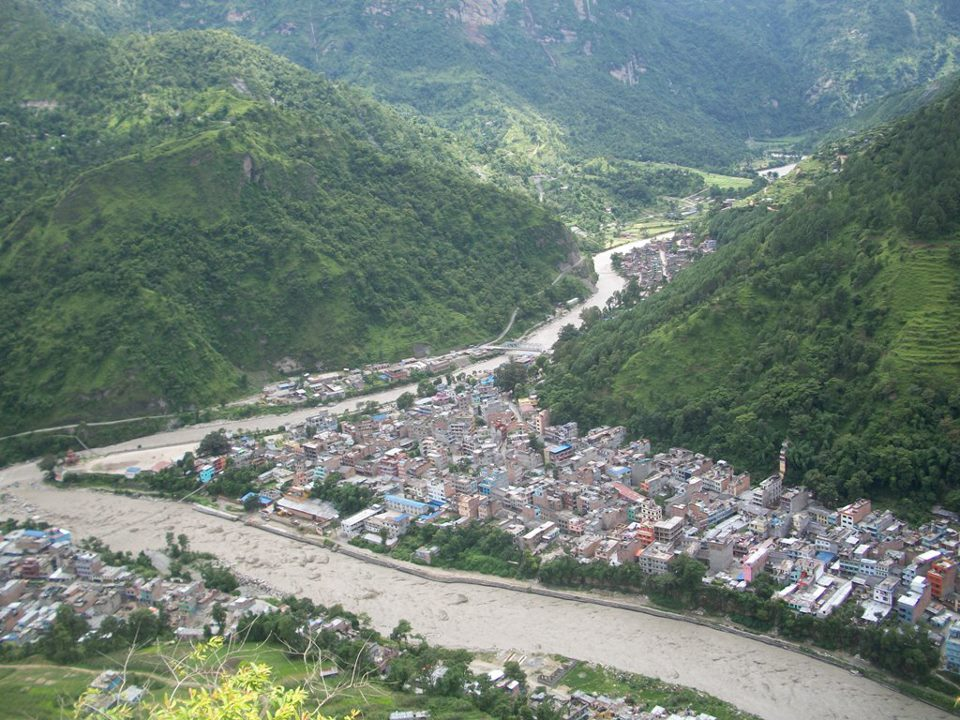

Location
- Country: Nepal

Basin features
- River system: Narayani River

Myagdi Khola is a river in Nepal which has its source at Mt. Dhaulagiri. It then passes through Myagdi District to meet the Kaligandaki River. The term "myagdi" may be originated from the two terms Meng and dee. Meng means thapa magar and Dee means water in magar language. It is the everflow river. The term "khola" means, in local (Nepali) language river.
