= Nepal Meteorology Development =

Nepal Meteorology Department
- नेपाल मौसम विज्ञान विभाग

Department overview
- Formed: 1988; 38 years ago
- Type: Weather and flood forecast
- Jurisdiction: Government of Nepal
- Status: Active
- Headquarters: Babarmahal, Kathmandu, Nepal
- Annual budget: Nrs. 504.4 Million (FY 2081/82)
- Director General responsible: Dr. Archana Shrestha (Acting)
- Parent department: Ministry of Energy, Water Resources and Irrigation
- Website: www.dhm.gov.np

Nepal Meteorology Department (Nepali: जल तथा मौसम विज्ञान विभाग) is a department under Ministry of Agriculture, Forests and Environment. Its mainly works by collecting data related to hydrology and meteorology throughout Nepal and processing to publish and disseminate them.

== History ==
Government of Nepal started hydro meteorological activities since 1962 AD. The activities were initiated as a section under the Department of Electricity which was later transferred to the Department of Irrigation. It was then upgraded to Department of Hydrology and Meteorology in 1988.

== Organization ==
The department and its branch offices are run by officers of Nepal Engineering Service (Civil/Metrology).

The department has 4 regional offices and two airport field offices in Pokhara and Bhairahawa. A few other projects also run under the department which are as follows:

- Office of Meteorology and Climatology, Dharan
- Office of Meteorology and Climatology, Janakpur
- Office of Meteorology and Climatology, Pokhara
- Office of Meteorology and Climatology, Birendranagar
- Office of Meteorology and Climatology, Attariya

== See also ==
- Department of Water Resources and Irrigation
- Department of Electricity Development
