= 2024 Nepal floods =

2024 floods in Nepal

- Date: July – October 2024
- Location: Nepal, primarily its eastern and south-eastern districts
- Cause: Urbanisation near flood plains and poor drainage infrastructure
- Deaths: 300+
- Missing: 50+
- Property damage: Rs17 billion+ (estimated)

Torrential rainfall during the annual monsoon season in early July, mid August, and late September 2024 caused massive flooding across Nepal as well as several mudslides. The September floods, which caused the most damage and deaths, were caused by the heaviest rainfall recorded in the region since at least 1970, the result of a low-pressure system. The impact of the floods was further increased by poor infrastructure and settlement planning, including unplanned construction on floodplains.

The most severe floods began on 26 September and heavily impacted several of eastern Nepal's districts, especially those districts adjacent to Kathmandu and the Bagmati River. The nearby states of India, such as Bihar, Uttar Pradesh and Assam, and parts of northern Bangladesh were also affected. The Kosi River filled to dangerous levels, while the Bagmati River and Nakkhu rivers caused flooding in Bagmati Province. The Kathmandu Valley received between 240 millimetres (9.4 in) and 322.2 millimetres (12.69 in) between 28 and 29 September, causing flooding in Nepal's capital, Kathmandu.

In late September, the Government of Nepal reported at least 224 deaths, 158 injuries, 28 missing persons due to severe flooding, including at least 37 in Kathmandu. Around 13,300 people required rescue, while at least 1,200 houses were destroyed or damaged. Infrastructure damages included 25 bridges, 37 highways, 11 hydropower stations, and numerous telecommunication stations. Agricultural and livestock resources were also damaged. Infrastructure, including waterpipes and access to power and internet, was damaged, and seven highways out of the city were blocked. Multiple casualties were reported from vehicles buried by landslides. The government directed police and military forces, totalling over 30,000 people, to assist with rescue and clean-up work, and schools and universities were closed in impacted areas. All flights from Tribhuvan International Airport were cancelled, and Nepalese schools and universities closed for three days.

== Floods ==
The annual monsoon season typically begins in June, and lasts until September. Flooding in Nepal coincided with 2024 floods in neighbouring and nearby states of India, such as Uttar Pradesh and Assam. Nepalese weather official Binu Maharjan stated that a low-pressure system lingering over nearby regions of India and over the Bay of Bengal was the primary cause of the increased and prolonged flooding in 2024. In response, several flood warnings were issued by the Nepalese government, along with a ban on travelling on highways at night and a warning against driving cars in general due to the risk of accidents or being caught in deadly flooding or mudslides.

== List of floods ==
=== July floods ===
As of 7 July 2024 at least 14 people were killed by flooding and nine were reported missing.

=== August floods ===
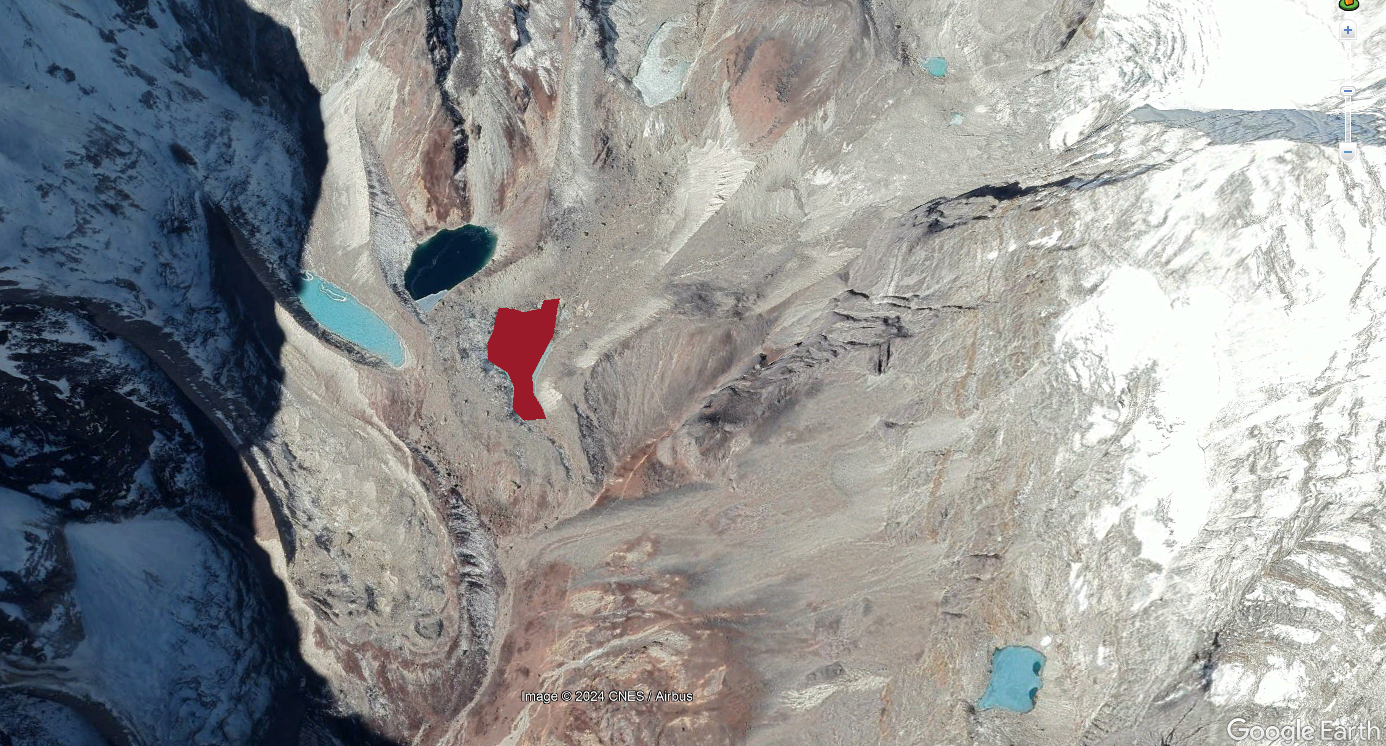
Location of lake burst

On 16 August 2024, two glacier lakes burst in the village of Thame in the Everest region of Solukhumbu District. The flood damaged a number of households in Khumbu Pasanglhamu Rural Municipality.

Initially, the flood was believed to be due to the blocked river breached by a landslide. However, an aerial inspection confirmed the cause and revealed that two lakes had broken through, one of the remaining three glacial lakes was safe, two others were still at risk. The rising temperatures since 9 August, which peaked at 15 °C (59 °F) on the day of the flood, contributed to the outburst.

The sudden flood displaced 135 people, including 40 children. Most residents had already left for Kathmandu or were at the weekly marketplace in Namche. Because the school was closed for the day, no students were hurt. Search and rescue operations was done by the Nepali Army and Nepal Police. The Ministry of Home Affairs coordinated disaster response efforts, and local officials provided the relief. The flood also disrupted key road networks and communication services.

On 18 August 2024 the Department of Hydrology and Meteorology issued warnings for potential further flooding and landslides, advising evacuation for those living along the Dudhkoshi River.

=== September floods ===
Beginning on 26 September, torrential levels of rain impacted most of Nepal, bringing the most rainfall to the nation's Eastern and Southeastern regions. South-eastern Nepal saw the Kosi River's water level surpass the danger level. Bagmati Province was heavily impacted by the flooding of the Bagmati River and the Nakkhu River. Kathmandu Valley received between 240 millimetres (9.4 in) and 322.2 millimetres (12.69 in) of rain over a period of 24 hours from the mornings of 28–29 September, representing the capital's largest recorded rainfall since 1970 at the latest. As of October 1 at least 217 deaths and 28 missing were confirmed due to flooding. Another 4,000 people required rescue.

In the capital Kathmandu, the Bagmati River rose two meters above its safe level, causing severe flooding, including a large section in the south of the city. Many residents took refuge on upper floors of homes, with some being rescued from their rooftops by helicopters and inflatable rafts. Much of the city also lost power and internet, and multiple water pipes were broken. Thousands of residents were displaced. At least 37 people were killed in the city, and 56 total deaths were reported in the wider Kathmandu Valley. Across Nepal, at least 322 houses and 16 bridges were damaged. Nepalese media described the rainfall as the worst that Kathmandu had suffered from in decades. Casualties were also reported in the regions of Bhaktapur, Dhading, Dolakha, and Makwanpur, and rescues were performed in Lalitpur. The city of Pokhara also sustained heavy flooding.

The UN Children's Fund (UNICEF) expressed particular concern over the impact of the disaster on children, including the deaths of 35 children under the age of eighteen (as of 1 October 2024) and the potential exposure to violence and exploitation. Pointing to the destruction of at least 12 schools and severe damage to many others, the agency also raised alarm over the loss of learning opportunities and a place where children could find comfort and normalcy.

==== Transportation disturbance ====
Three highways (including Prithvi Highway) and multiple roads which connected Kathmandu to eastern Nepal were taken out by landslides caused by the rain. At least 35 bodies were recovered on Prithvi Highway, from vehicles which had been buried under landslides. Kathmandu was cut off from transport. In addition, 14 bodies were recovered from two buses that were travelling to Kathmandu before being struck by and buried in a landslide. Many more vehicles were found to have been buried nearby the buses. In response, officials discouraged cars and banned buses from travelling at night on highways. Debris and damage to roads caused the obstruction of highways at twenty-eight locations. By 30 September, officials were able to temporarily open Prithvi Highway. By 1 October, only nine of the country's 37 highways were open for travel. Meanwhile BP Highway was expected to open only after Dashain.

==== Response ====
Over 3,000 security personnel from all forces, including the army, were assigned to aid rescue and recovery operations using motorboats, rafts, and helicopters.

On 27 September, all domestic flights departing from Kathmandu were cancelled, impacting over 150 departures. Flights had largely resumed by 29 September.

Nepalese schools and universities were shut down for three days.

The International Centre for Integrated Mountain Development stated that improper investment into Nepal's infrastructure and its poor planning contributed to the magnitude of the disaster. More specifically, unplanned settlement, construction and urbanisation on floodplains, a lack of areas to hold water, and growing human settlement along the Bagmati River were each noted as significant contributors to the scale of the tragedy. The centre insisted that the government invest more in its infrastructure, including flood prevention mechanisms such as underground stormwater systems.

== See also ==
- May 2012 Nepal floods
- 2019 Nepal floods
- 2021 Nepal floods
- 2020 South Asian floods
- 2025 Nepal floods
