= 2021 Mount Manapathi avalanche =

Avalanche in Nepal

Coordinates: 29.003°N 83.749°E

- Date: 14 November 2021
- Location: Mount Manapathi, Nepal
- Type: avalanche
- Deaths: 0
- Injuries: 11

A massive avalanche occurred in Mount Manapathi near Kowang area that lies about 19 km from Jomsom in Mustang district of Nepal. The avalanche triggered on the morning of 14 November 2021. In the incident, eight adults and three school children from Thasang Rural Municipality were injured. About 120 yaks went missing, possibly buried, after the avalanche. For rescue operation and access the damage, Armed Police Force, Nepali Army and Nepal Police were deployed.
