= 2019 Nepal floods =

2019 floods in Nepal

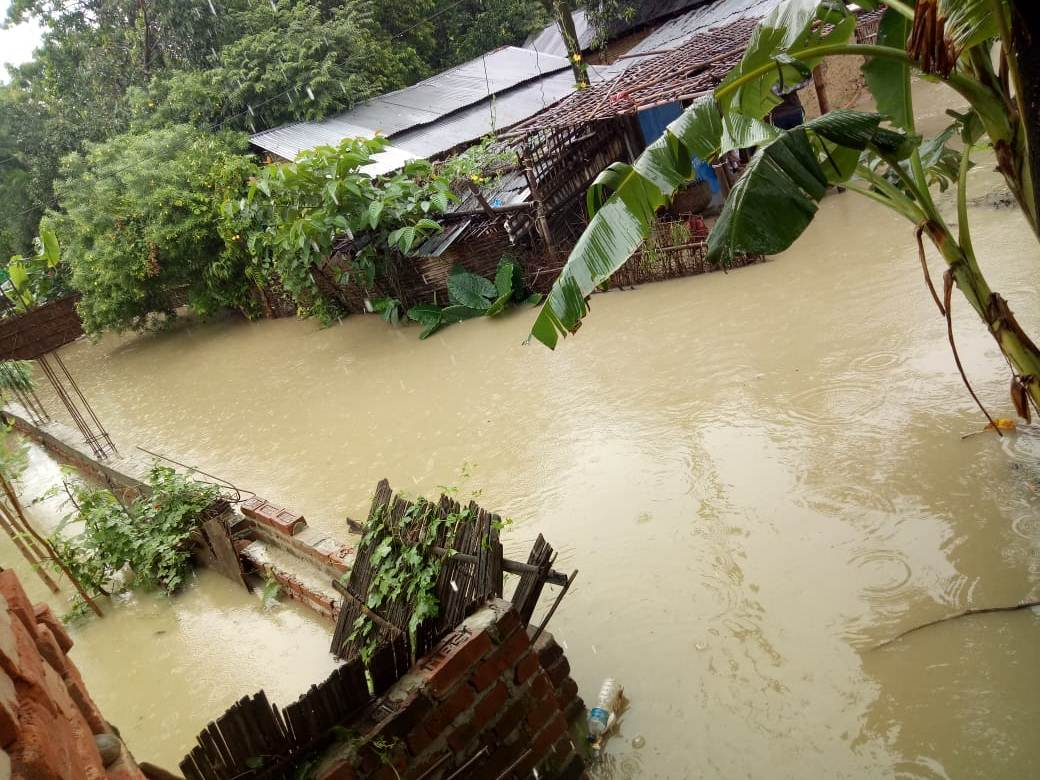
- Flooding in Terai, Nepal
- Date: 11 July
- Location: Nepal
- Cause: Climate change and poor drainage infrastructure
- Deaths: at least 78

The 2019 Nepal floods were a series of flash floods that affected widespread areas of Nepal. Severe flooding was seen in many regions, especially in the Terai area and Kathmandu.

Heavy rainfall on account of the monsoon season began on 11 July and caused disruption in many areas, specially in Province No. 2 and Province No. 1. Effects included an estimated 78 casualties, much livestock, and significant damage to property and infrastructure. Many regions in the south part of Nepal were impacted, with highways collapsing in many parts, including the main life line highway of Nepal.

== See also ==
- 2020 Nepal floods
- 2024 Nepal floods
