= Bishowambhar Prasad Shrestha =

Nepalese judge

The Rt Hon. Bishowambhar Prasad Shrestha
- विश्‍वम्भर प्रसाद श्रेष्ठ

Chief Justice of Nepal
- In office 22 August 2023 (Note: Acting: 6 – 21 August 2023) – 4 October 2024
- Appointed by: Ram Chandra Poudel (President of Nepal)
- Preceded by: Hari Krishna Karki
- Succeeded by: Prakash Man Singh Raut

Personal details
- Born: 6 October 1959 (age 67) Doti, Nepal
- Occupation: Justice

Bishowambhar Prasad Shrestha is a former Nepali jurist who served as the 31st Chief Justice of the Supreme Court of Nepal. He was appointed by the president on the recommendation of the Constitutional Council. He was administered the oath of the chief justice of the Supreme Court by Ram Chandra Poudel, President of Nepal on 22 August 2023.

== See also ==
- Deepak Raj Joshee
- Gopal Prasad Parajuli
