= Ghode Jatra =

Festival and public holiday in Nepal

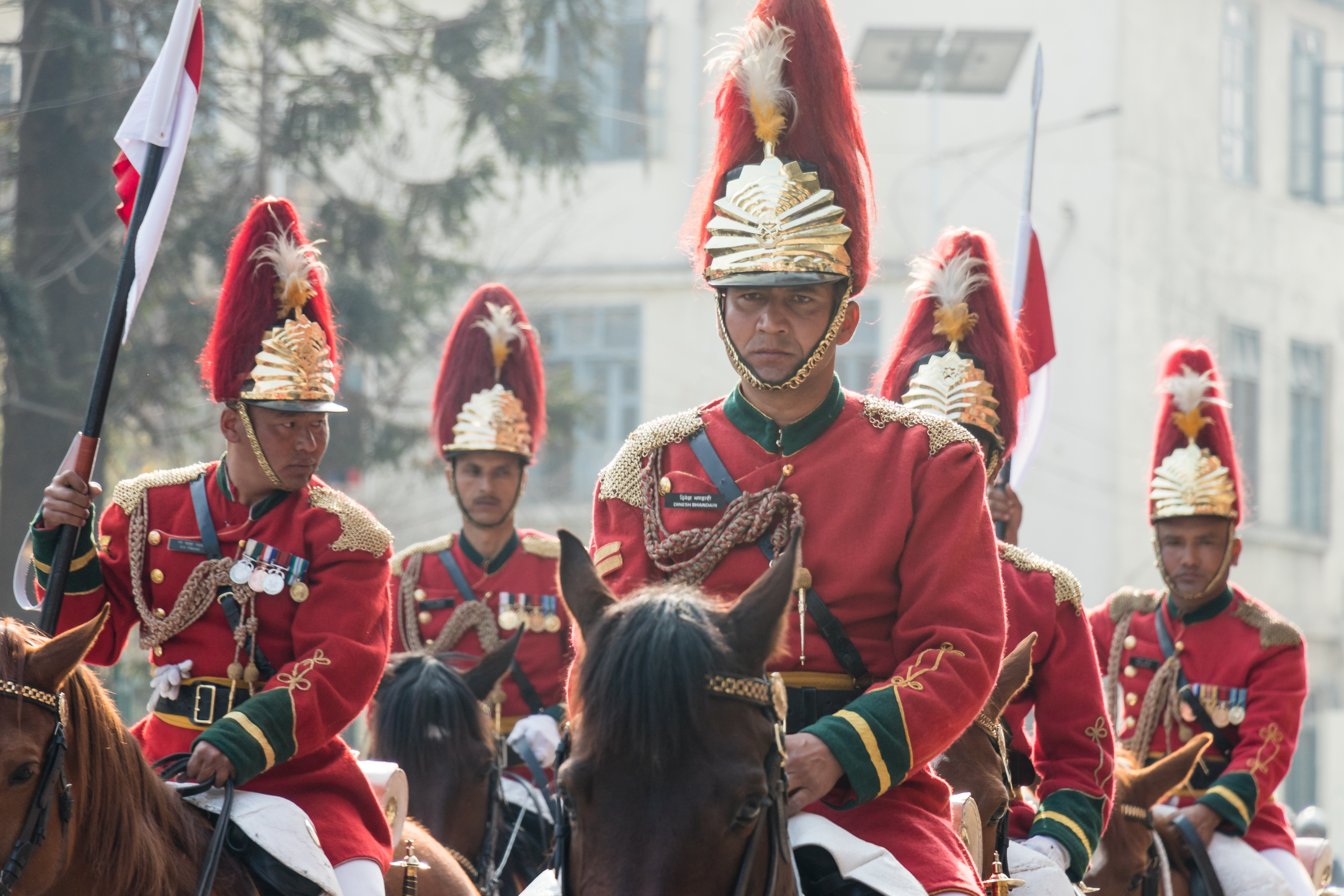
- Official name: Ghode Jatra
- Observed by: Nepal
- Celebrations: Horse parade takes place in Tundikhel
- Date: New moon of Chaitra Sukla Pakshya
- Frequency: Annual

Explanatory note on Hindu festival dates
- The Hindu calendar is lunisolar but most festival dates are specified using the lunar portion of the calendar. A lunar day is uniquely identified by three calendar elements: māsa (lunar month), pakṣa (lunar fortnight) and tithi (lunar day). Furthermore, when specifying the masa, one of two traditions are applicable, viz. amānta / pūrṇimānta. If a festival falls in the waning phase of the moon, these two traditions identify the same lunar day as falling in two different (but successive) masa. A lunar year is shorter than a solar year by about eleven days. As a result, most Hindu festivals occur on different days in successive years on the Gregorian calendar.

Ghode Jatra (Nepali: घोडे जात्रा) is a horse festival native to Kathmandu, Nepal. The festival occurs annually in mid-March or early April.

In the festival, a horse parade is organized in Tundikhel and competitions are held in the presence of the head of the state. Nepal Army organizes the parade and competitions.

Kathmandu native Newar people mark the festival with a feast. A public holiday is observed in Kathmandu on the day of Ghode Jatra.

== Origin ==
In the inner city of Kathmandu, whenever children disappeared, it was assumed that demons or cannibals did it. In order to scare off the bad spirits, campers in Tudikhel who had horses with them, were asked to run those horses around Tudikhel to scare off the demons. People gathered and fed the demons near the tree that is still located in the middle of Tudikhel. The ritual later took a form of festival. The tradition later changed into a national festival.

== See also ==
- List of festivals in Nepal
