= Gai Jatra =

Hindu festival in Nepal

Sa Paru
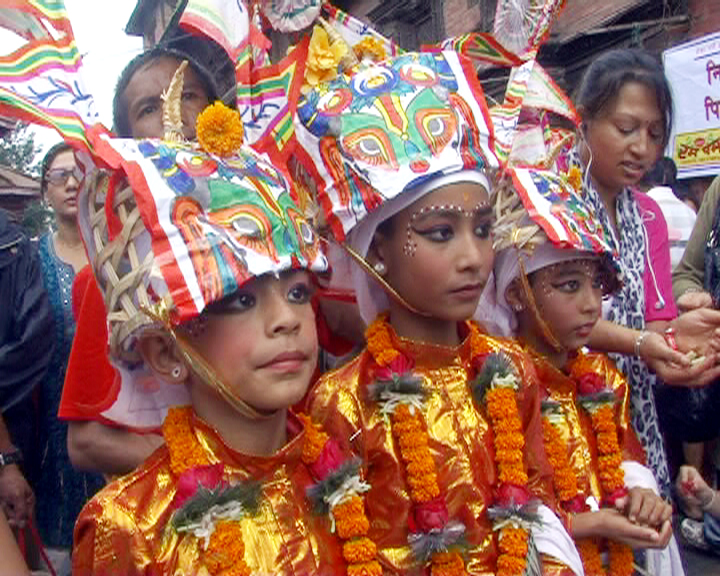
- Children dressed up for Gai Jatra
- Observed by: Newar people
- Type: Religious, Nepal
- Significance: Time to remember lost ones and also to ease the pain.
- Observances: Carnival, dance, rallies
- Date: Day following the full moon (waning fortnight) of the month of Gunla in the Nepal Sambat calendar
- Frequency: Annual

Gai Jatra (Newar: गाईजात्रा), also known by its endonym of Sa Paru (Nepal Bhasa: 𑐳𑐵𑐥𑐵𑐬𑐸, sāpāru) or Saya (Nepal Bhasa: 𑐳𑐵𑐫𑐵𑑅, sāyāḥ), is a Nepalese festival celebrated mainly in the Kathmandu Valley by the Newar people. The festival is celebrated in honour of their immediate relatives who have died during the previous year. Various groups of children dressed up as cows and in other religious drags are organized throughout various cities.

The festival takes place in waning fortnight of the month of Gunla in the Nepal Sambat calendar, falling between September and August.

== Etymology ==
The current name of the festival sāyāḥ comes from the Classical Newar word sāyāta (Newar: 𑐳𑐵𑐫𑐵𑐟), a name which is attested in various Classical Newar sources from the Malla period, the earliest of them being the Gopal Raj Vamshavali written in the 1380s. This name comes from the Newar word sā, meaning cow and the Sanskrit word yātrā meaning procession.

Another name for the festival is sāpāru where sā means cow in Newar pāru is a word that could refer to the lunar fortnight or a mask. According to the local folklore, sāpāru comes from the phrase sāpā meaning "cow mask", referring to the cow masks used during procession. However, pāru also refers to the lunar fortnight, i.e. the day following the full moon or the new moon, derived from Classical Newar pādo ultimately from, Sanskrit Pratipada.

The name of the festival in Nepali, gāi jātrā, is a translation of the Newar name sāyāta.

== Origin ==
Gai Jatra was started by King Pratap Malla during his reign from 1641 to 1671 AD. His teenage son Chakravartendra Malla died an untimely death and the queen grieved the loss of her son. King Pratap Malla started this tradition to help ascend his son to the next life and cheer the grieving queen and families of those whose loved ones had died.

However, the association of the festival's origin exclusively with Pratap Malla has been questioned by historians. According to historian Prof. Dr. Purushottam Lochan Shrestha and historical evidence discussed in relation to the festival, Gai Jatra may have existed in the Kathmandu Valley more than three centuries before Pratap Malla's reign. The tradition may have been associated with Jayasthiti Malla, the ruler of Bhaktapur in the 14th century. The Gopal Raj Vamshavali, an important historical chronicle of Nepal, is cited as containing references to Sa: Paru or related observances from this earlier period.

This interpretation suggests that the festival may have originated in Bhaktapur and subsequently developed in other parts of the Kathmandu Valley. Pratap Malla may therefore have continued an existing tradition in Kantipur, while introducing or expanding particular customs, performances and forms of satire associated with the festival.

The historical origin of Gai Jatra is therefore not conclusively established. The Pratap Malla account remains the most widely circulated traditional explanation for the festival's establishment in Kathmandu, while evidence concerning the earlier observance of Sa: Paru in Bhaktapur suggests that the festival may have a considerably older history. In Bhaktapur, the festival remains particularly associated with remembrance of the deceased, processions, traditional dances and satirical street performances.

== Celebrations ==
In the Hindu religion, Gai (Cow) is sacred like a Lakshmi and viewed as a mother. The children of those whose families had died would come out to Hanuman Dhoka Palace and the Newar priest performs the prayers for those passed. The children usually wear long skirts and must have a tulle belt around their waist with the ends hanging on both their right and left sides that drag on the ground while walking. It is necessary that it drag because it touches the ground (Earth) for the loved ones who died to ascend from Earth to heaven. This is a festival of dragging clothes while walking. The children also wear headdresses that have a cow drawn on them which is important, and they wear a moustache drawn on their faces. The Jatra is supposed to be religious for the Newar community to help loved ones pass from Earth to heaven and cheer those left behind. The parade of drag is done in the morning by children and in the evening with caricature and stand-up comedy by Hanuman Dhoka Dabali for the grieving Queen and others.

Since the 1900s, the caricatures and jokes have improved and have also included political satires, particularly for TV shows. Usually the male standup comedians wear women's clothing and perform both male and female parts of the play. This event serves as a form of entertainment for the Newar community as well as other Nepalese communities.

== Gai Jatra in different cities ==
Gai Jatra is mainly celebrated in the cities of Kathmandu Valley—Kathmandu, Patan, and Bhaktapur. The celebration of the festival has also spread to other parts of the country which have a significant Newar community.

=== Kathmandu ===
Kathmandu is considered the main source of this festival because the king who started this festival was from this city. After the show presented to the queen was a success, it became an annual program to present the queen with this festival. As time passed and the king and queen died, the festival was passed on from generation to generation. In Kathmandu, people celebrate it with much happiness and many more programs than those in Patan. The procession goes around the city to different parts of the suburbs and the inner urban areas to present their devotion to their loved ones. The people involved in this profession get small packets with fruits, sweets, oats, and other food items to help them on their tour around the city by many people watching the festival and by their loved ones.

=== Patan ===
Patan has a similar kind of following for this festival like that with Kathmandu, but has less involvement of people than that in Kathmandu. People in Lalitpur have another festival similar to Gaijatra called Matiyaa followed by Hindus with much more devotion and involvement by the people. Thousands of people can be involved in this Matiya. Thus, for people in Lalitpur, the procession of Gaijatra is less entertaining.

=== Kirtipur ===
Gaijatra is celebrated widely, and particularly in Kirtipur's ancient historical towns: Kipu, Naga and Panga. The people in who celebrate in Kirtipur have many reasons to celebrate this festival and have a unique way of celebrating this festival. Among the people of Kirtipur, it is said that the gates of heaven for the dead are opened on this day, and the procession of Gaijatra will help their beloved to reach the gates of heaven if they march around the city for them. They march around the city of Kirtipur not by dressing up like cows but rather by dressing up in different forms of gods and goddesses. People celebrate this festival for their dead relatives and for peace and harmony among family members and the city itself.

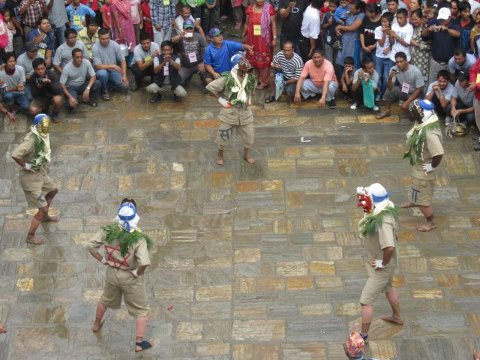
People dressed as different deities dancing in procession of Gai Jatra.

During this month, the city's farmers finish their work in the fields and return home to celebrate the end of the hard and tedious work in the fields. They gather family members and have a feast to their success. This culture is replicated in this festival in Kirtipur. Men dress up like women and travel around the city. They go from house to house, calling up the house's owners and asking them to come down and join in the feast with them. This helps to create harmony among the neighbors and the city members. Kirtipur performs many dances with different imitating artists that provide much awe and happiness among the people. Kirtipur is enriched with many more beliefs and stories relating to Gaijatra than any other cities of the valley, and it has a more diverse celebration of this festival.

=== Bhaktapur ===
Gai Jatra in Bhaktapur differs in several respects from celebrations in Kathmandu and Lalitpur. Families construct a bamboo chariot known as a Taha-Macha, which is wrapped in cloth and bears a photograph of the deceased. The chariot is then carried along a prescribed route through the city by family members and local residents. The procession may include a long succession of such chariots.

The Taha-Macha symbolizes the dead and is decorated with their possessions and photographs. The chariot has a framework of bamboo which is wrapped with cotton cloth, usually Hakupatasi (a black traditional sari type female cloth) for women and simple sari type cloth for men. The Taha-Machas are brought out from different toles of Bhaktapur. Still, the Taha-Machas of Lakolachhen are guided by one large Taha-Macha that has the bamboo framework but is covered in straws. This is known as Bhailya Dya: (Bhairab) and is succeeded by Ajima (Bhadrakali) made at Khala (Ajima Dyo:Chhen)

Many local musicians, and a cultural dance called Ghintang Ghisi follow in the wake of a chariot. Men are also seen wearing women's dress, Hakupatasi. People dress up in many ways. There is face painting and masks are common. Children dress up as gods and partake in the celebrations.

The Ghintang Ghisi dance is celebrated for almost a week, from the day of Gaijatra to Krishna Janmashtami. The dance is done in a long queue with two people in a row hitting each other's sticks. Many cultural shows are performed, and many nearby villages even participate in the festival.
