= Prithvi Jayanti =

National holiday celebrated in Nepal

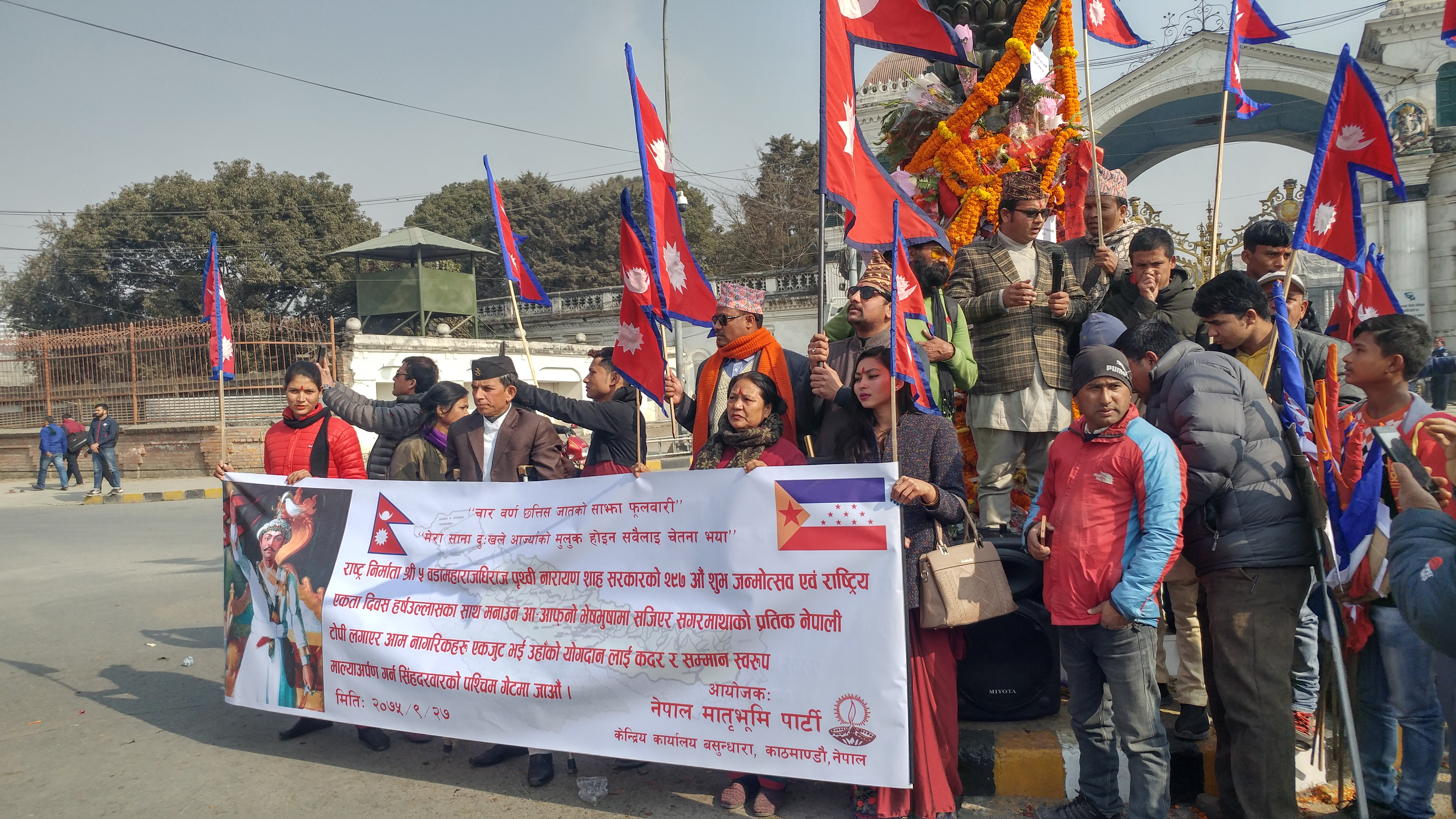
- Prithvi Jayanti being celebrated outside Singha Durbar in 2019
- Also called: Unity Day
- Observed by: Nepal
- Type: Patriotic
- Significance: Commemorates the birth of King Prithvi Narayan Shah
- Celebrations: People offer garlands at statues of Prithvi Narayan Shah, notably at Singha Durbar in Kathmandu.; talk program, Parades and other events are organized by various organisations.
- Begins: 1956 (Note: Again in 2023, government of nepal has announced a public holiday to celebrate this occasion, which was halted following Nepal's transformation into a republic in 2008.)
- Date: 27th day of the Nepali month Pausha
- Frequency: Annual

Prithvi Jayanti (Nepali: पृथ्वी जयन्ती, lit. 'Birthday of Prithvi Narayan Shah'; also known as the Nepal Ekikaran Diwas (Nepali: नेपाल एकीकरण दिवस, lit. 'Unity Day') is a holiday annually celebrated on 11 January to commemorate the birth of King Prithvi Narayan Shah, who was the first king of unified Nepal. In the mid-18th century, he set out to unify the small kingdoms which would become present-day Nepal. During the observance, many people add a garland to statues of Shah, participate in the parades, and remember his contribution to Nepal. Prithvi Jayanti was celebrated as a public holiday from 1951 until its abolishment in 2006. However, some local governments in Gorkha District and Nuwakot District have declared Prithvi Jayanti to be a public holiday. In 2023, after 16 years, the central government in Nepal declared it a national holiday.

== History ==
=== Unification ===
In the mid-18th century, Prithvi Narayan Shah, king of the Kingdom of Gorkha set out to unify small kingdoms which would become present-day Nepal. After his victory at the Battle of Nuwakot (1744), he headed for the Kathmandu Valley, where the three Malla kingdoms Bhaktapur, Patan, and Kantipur were ruling. Shah went to a battle with the Kingdom of Patan over the town of Kirtipur, and in 1767 the town fell into the hands of the Gorkhas. This posed a threat to Kantipur, subsequently, the King of Kantipur, Jaya Prakash Malla, requested assistance from the East India Company to stop the rapid expansion of Gorkha.

Recently, Shah had also imposed a blockade on the kingdom which hurt the East India Company's trans-Himalayan trade with Tibet and China as they used the route that went through Kantipur. The company accepted the request and sent Captain Kinloch, who met Prithvi Narayan Shah's forces at the Battle of Sindhuli in 1767. The battle proved to be disastrous for the company, as Kinloch fled with approximately 800 soldiers out of almost 24,000. After this, Shah managed to conquer the valley and proclaimed himself the King of Nepal on 25 September 1768. After Prithvi Narayan Shah's death, the Unification of Nepal campaign was continued, notably by Prince Bahadur Shah, Queen Rajendra, and Bhimsen Thapa. At its greatest extent, the Kingdom of Nepal extended from the Sutlej River in the west to the Teesta River in the east.

=== Contemporary ===
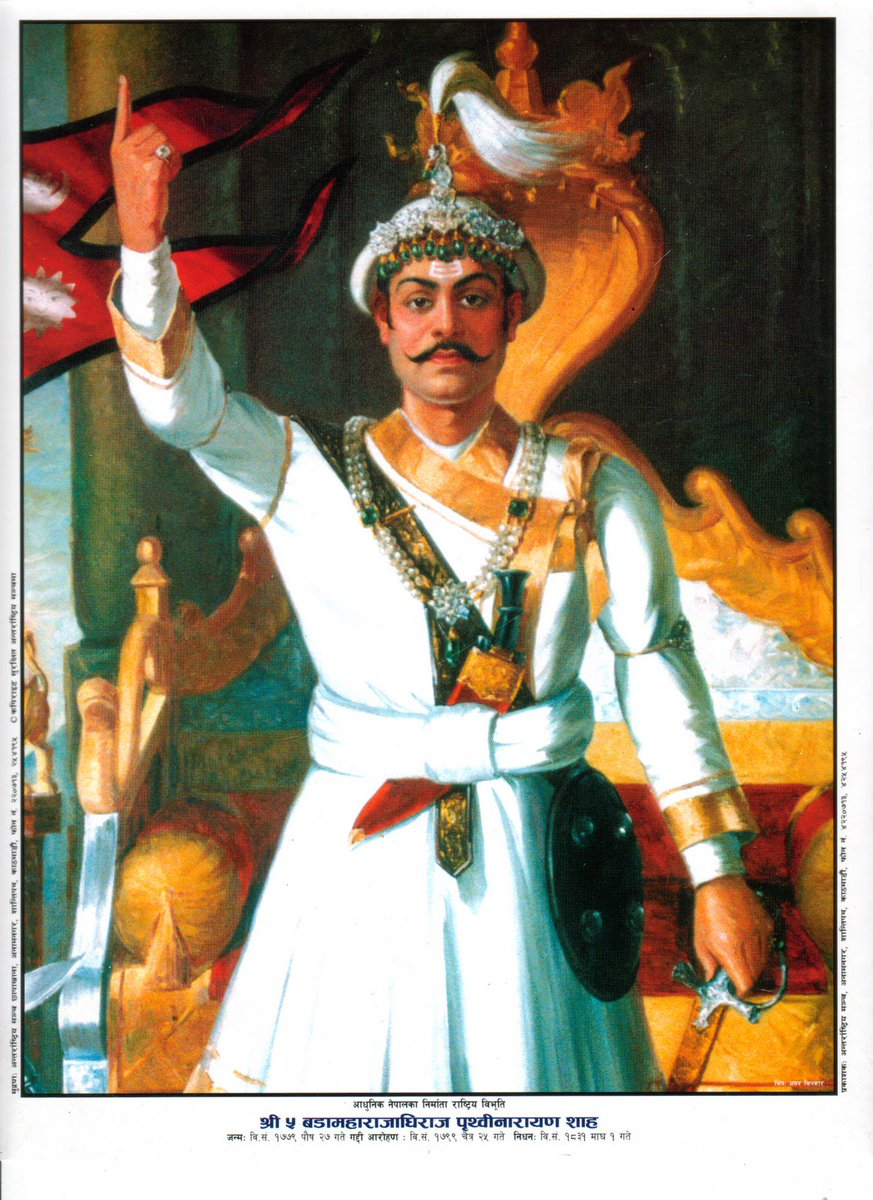
Posthumous painting of King Prithvi Narayan Shah

Prithvi Jayanti is also known as the Nepal Ekikaran Diwas (National Unification Day) or National Unity Day. From 1951, Prithvi Jayanti was traditionally celebrated as a public holiday, however, it was abolished after the 2006 Nepalese revolution. In 2019, the mayor of Gorkha Municipality proclaimed Prithvi Jayanti to be a public holiday in the municipality to "celebrate and honour Prithvi Narayan Shah and celebrate the day in his memory". Other municipalities followed soon in Gorkha District to declare this day to be a public holiday including the Palungtar Municipality, the Ajirkot Rural Municipality, the Siranchok Rural Municipality, and the Bhimsen Thapa Rural Municipality. Next year, Bidur Municipality, the capital of Nuwakot District, also proclaimed it to be a public holiday. There is pressure from some Nepalese citizens, especially from the pro-monarchies, to make Prithvi Jayanti a public holiday.

In 2021, the Nepal Police and pro-monarchy supporters clashed, injuring some, as they were trying to put garlands on the statue of Prithvi Narayan Shah in a restricted area outside Singha Durbar. People are usually divided on celebrating Prithvi Jayanti. Some feel without Prithvi Narayan Shah's unification campaign, Nepal would have been a colony of the British Empire. Others say some people seeking the restoration of the Kingdom of Nepal and restoring the Shah's significance would "revert to an era where both caste and cultural dominance had the overt backing of the state". In 2022, Rajendra Prasad Lingden, the Chairman of the Rastriya Prajatantra Party, sent a memorandum asking Prime Minister Sher Bahadur Deuba to declare Prithvi Jayanti a public holiday, and the party had said they would start a nationwide protests if their request was not met. The same year, Bibeksheel Sajha Party said Prithvi Jayanti should be celebrated as Nepal Day and supported the idea of declaring it a public holiday. In 2023, owing to pressure from the pro-monarchy Rastriya Prajatantra Party as RPP had proposed the Prithvi Jayanti holiday as a precondition for its support to the Pushpa Kamal Dahal-led government, the government declared it as a national holiday.

== Celebrations ==
Prithvi Narayan Shah was born on 11 January 1723 (Bikram Sambat: 27 Poush 1779) in Gorkha Palace, Gorkha District, Nepal. During Prithvi Jayanti, high officials including the Chief of Army Staff, the President of Nepal, and the Prime Minister of Nepal remember Shah's contribution to Nepal. The people who participate in parades chant slogans praising Prithvi Narayan Shah. Quotes from Divyopadesh, a collection of teachings of Shah, are also chanted. The statues of Shah throughout Nepal are garlanded. The Nepali Army organises a unification torch rally from the birthplace of Shah in Gorkha which concludes after reaching the capital, Kathmandu, on 11 January. Other programs are also organised throughout Nepal.

In December 2021, a committee representing the Nepal Academy, the Nepal Academy of Music and Drama, and the Nepal Academy of Fine Arts and Cultural Corporation was formed to celebrate the 300th Prithvi Jayanti in 2022. On 9 January, the committee will organise a book and painting exhibition, next day there will be a talk program, and on the last day on 11 January, there will be cultural processions and program.
