= List of fabrics and textile of Nepal =

Traditional cotton and woollen fabrics historically produced in Nepal

The traditional textile industry of Nepal historically produced a wide range of cotton and woolen piece goods, many of which were manufactured domestically in Newar households and hill regions. These fabrics varied by texture, pattern, and regional style, serving both practical and cultural purposes. The following are among the principal varieties historically recorded in the Kathmandu Valley and surrounding regions.

== List ==
- Chinea is a coarse, hard, and thin cotton fabric manufactured in almost every Newar household throughout the Kathmandu Valley and the surrounding hills. It is typically woven in lengths of 10 to 14 yards and about 18 inches in width. In the Kathmandu, it sold for approximately one to one and a half rupees per piece in 1970s. The cloth is usually unbleached.
- Khadir is a thick, coarse, and durable fabric produced in large quantities in Nuwakot, the Kathmandu Valley, and hill regions. It is similar to Khadi and also known as Khaddar. It is popular among cultivators of all communities, including Parbattiahs and Newars. The fabric measuring 14 yards in length and 16 to 18 inches in width, sold for about 12 annas to one rupee per piece in 1970s. It is known for its longevity and is sold unbleached.
- Purabi Chint is an imitation of Indian chintz, produced in Dhankuta and other eastern hill areas. It generally features narrow black and red stripes, is coarse and heavy in texture, and is worn by poorer Parbattiah and Newar women.
- Mumi Chint is produced in Dhankuta and nearby regions. It resembles Purabi Chint and is commonly used to make cholis (bodices) and saris for Parbattiah and Newar women.
- Banarasi Chint is made in Bhaktapur (Bhatgaon) and comes in various colors and patterns. It is lighter and thinner than other chintzes and is often used as lining for jackets and women’s dresses.
- Kabir Chint is woven mainly in the hills west of Kathmandu. It is coarse, heavy, and roughly dyed and printed, but among the broadest of Nepalese fabrics. .
- Durkeeah Chint is produced chiefly in Pokhara and Butwal. It is coarse, heavy, and relatively wide, used for jacket linings and dresses.
- Butidar Chint derives its name from its spotted pattern. It is a popular Bhaktapur chintz.
- Hara Chint is primarily produced in the small Banepa Valley, about 20 miles east of Kathmandu. It is coarse and hard in texture, similar to other local chintz fabrics.
- Purabi Kadi originates in the eastern hills and is broader and somewhat finer than Nuwakot Khadir. It is exported from Nepal to Tibet (Bhote region).
- Kasa is a Nepalese imitation of Indian malmal (muslin or gauze), produced in large quantities by Newar weavers in Bhaktapur and other areas. Though of poor quality, it is used for turbans. It is mostly worn by poorer Parbattiahs and some Newars, as most Newars traditionally wear a small skull cap instead of a turban.
- Bhengra is a coarse, durable fabric similar to canvas, made from the inner bark of trees by hill communities. It is used for making grain sacks and for transporting goods. The bark is beaten and pounded before being spun into thread. Known for its strength and water resistance.
- Rhari is a thick woollen blanket produced by the Bhote people of the Nepalese hills. Each piece measuring about 7 yards long and 14 inches wide was sold at approximately three rupees in 1970s. It is durable and well-suited for cold, rainy climates. The fabric is domestically woven by Bhote families for personal use and is sometimes reinforced with extra wool to resemble felt.
- Bhote fabric, named after its makers, is produced in the northern hill regions of Nepal up to the snow line. It is a soft, thick woollen material—part blanket, part felt—warmer and lighter than Rhari but less resistant to rain.
- Patasi is a strong, coarse, check-patterned cloth made by Newar women, usually in white and blue or red and white. Entirely domestically produced, it is rarely available in markets, as it is mainly woven for personal use. A typical piece measuring about 5 yards long and 3 feet wide sold at three and a half rupees in 1970s.
- Punika is a Newar imitation of the Dinapur tablecloth style known as Beni’s eyes. Several varieties exist, most of them coarse and heavy. It is worn by upper-class Newars and occasionally by Parbattiah elites. Production is concentrated in the larger towns of the Kathmandu Valley.
- Bhim Page is an ancient Newar fabric that has fallen out of everyday use. In later periods, it is used primarily for ritual purposes, such as wrapping the bodies of deceased religious figures before cremation. The warp is made of coarse cotton, while the weft consists of soft, hand-spun wool mixed with fine fleece. The resulting fabric is soft and warm but not waterproof.
- Dhaka , originally called Thaka, is a traditional handmade fabric of the Limbu people from eastern Nepal, especially Terhathum district. The craft is passed down through generations and has gained worldwide popularity. It represents Limbu cultural attire—men wear a dhaka topi and scarf, while women wear dhaka mekhli, shawl, and sari.

== See also ==
- Newar traditional clothing
- Culture of Nepal
- Dhaka fabric
