= Culture of Nepal =

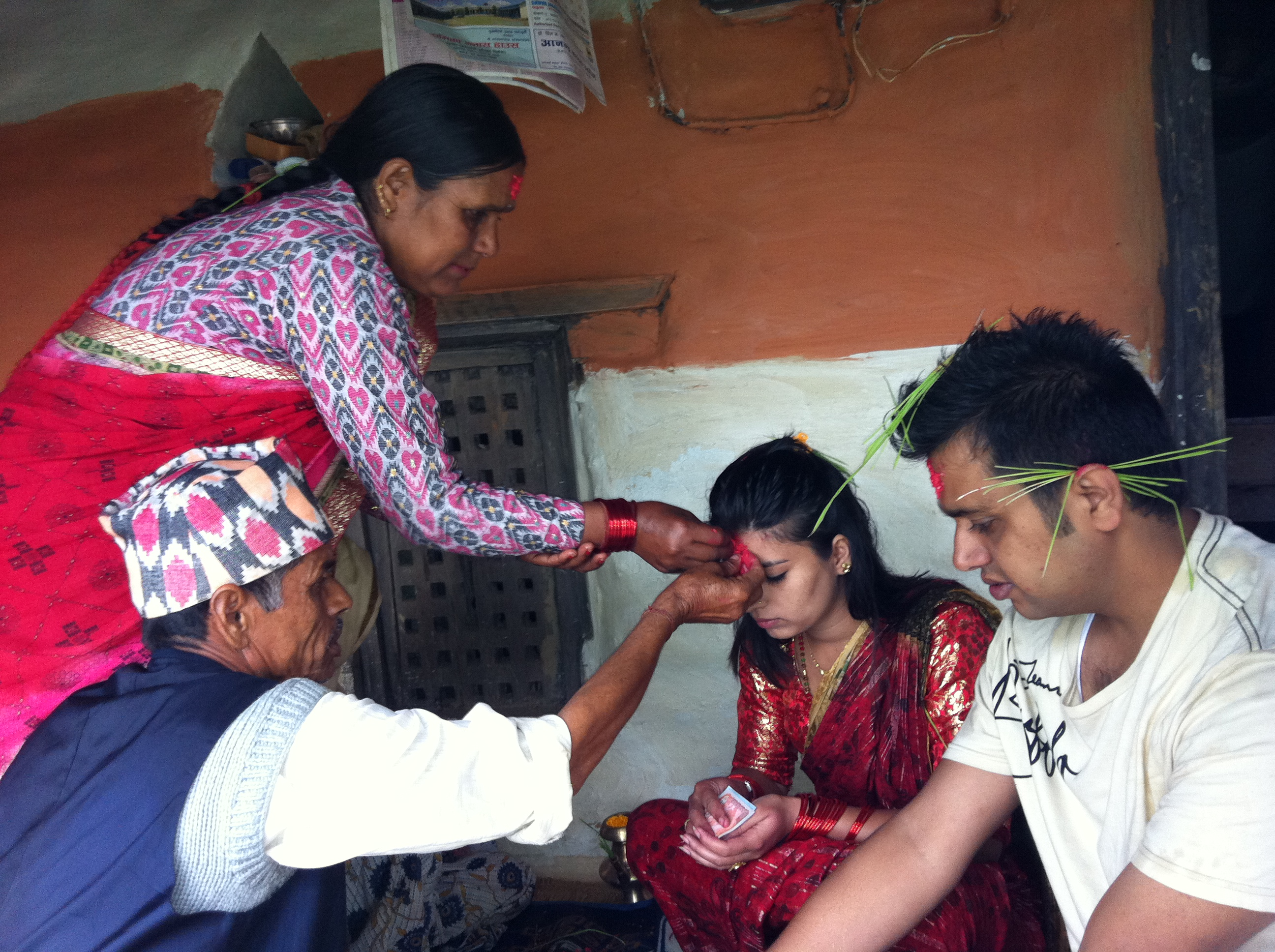
Senior offering Dashain Tika on great Nepali Hindu festival at a traditional home.

The culture of Nepal encompasses the various cultures belonging to the 125 distinct ethnic groups present in Nepal. The culture of Nepal is expressed through music and dance; art and craft; folklore; languages and literature; philosophy and religion; festivals and celebration; foods and drinks.

== Dance and music ==
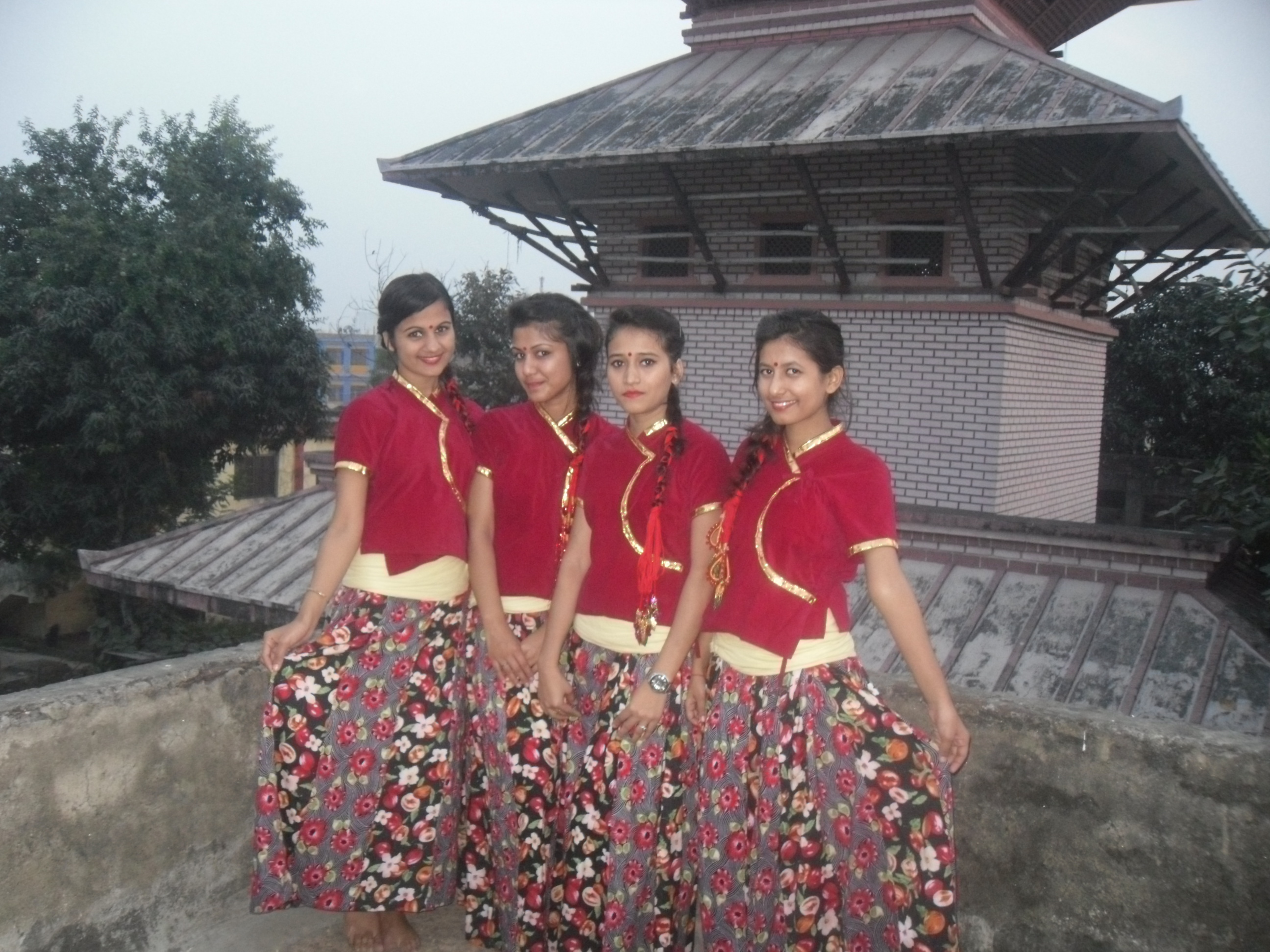
Nepali traditional Pahadi dress used for dance

Legends state that dances in this country originated in the abode of Lord Shiva — the Himalayas, where he performed the tandava dance. This indicates that dance traditions of Nepal are very ancient and unique. With altitudes and ethnicity, the dances of Nepal slightly change in style as well as in the costumes. The Dishka, a dance performed at weddings, includes intricate footwork and arm movements. Accompanying music and musical instruments change in tune with the themes, which revolve around topics like harvesting of crops, marriage rites, war stories, love, and several other themes and stories from everyday life in the villages. The Tharu stick dances and the peacock dance are also performed.

== Languages ==
As many as 124 languages are spoken in Nepal according to the 2021 census. Most of them belong to either the Indo-Aryan or the Tibeto-Burman language families. The major languages of the country (percent spoken as mother tongue) are Nepali (44.8%), Maithili (11.05%), Bhojpuri (6.2%), Tharu (5.8%), Tamang (4.88%), Nepal Bhasa (2.9%), Magar (2.78%) and Bajjika (3.8%), and Doteli (1.7%).

Nepali, written in Devanagari script, is the official national language and serves as lingua franca among Nepalese ethnolinguistic groups.

== Religions and philosophy ==
The 2021 census identified 81.19% of the population being Hindu. Buddhism was practiced by about 8.21% of the population. About 5.09% practice Islam and 3.17% follow the indigenous Kirant religion. Christianity is practiced officially by less 1.76% of the population.

Hindu and Buddhist traditions in Nepal go back more than two millennia. In Lumbini, Buddha was born, and Pashupatinath temple, Kathmandu, is an old and famous Shiva temple of Hindus. Nepal has several other temples and Buddhist monasteries, as well as places of worship of other religious groups. Traditionally, Nepalese philosophical thoughts are ingrained with the Hindu and Buddhist philosophical ethos and traditions, which include elements of Kashmir Shaivism, Nyingma school of Tibetan Buddhism, works of Karmacharyas of Bhaktapur, and tantric traditions. Tantric traditions are deep-rooted in Nepal, including the practice of animal sacrifices. Five types of animals, always male, are considered acceptable for sacrifice: water buffalo, goats, sheep, chickens, and ducks. Cows are very sacred animals and are never considered acceptable for sacrifice.

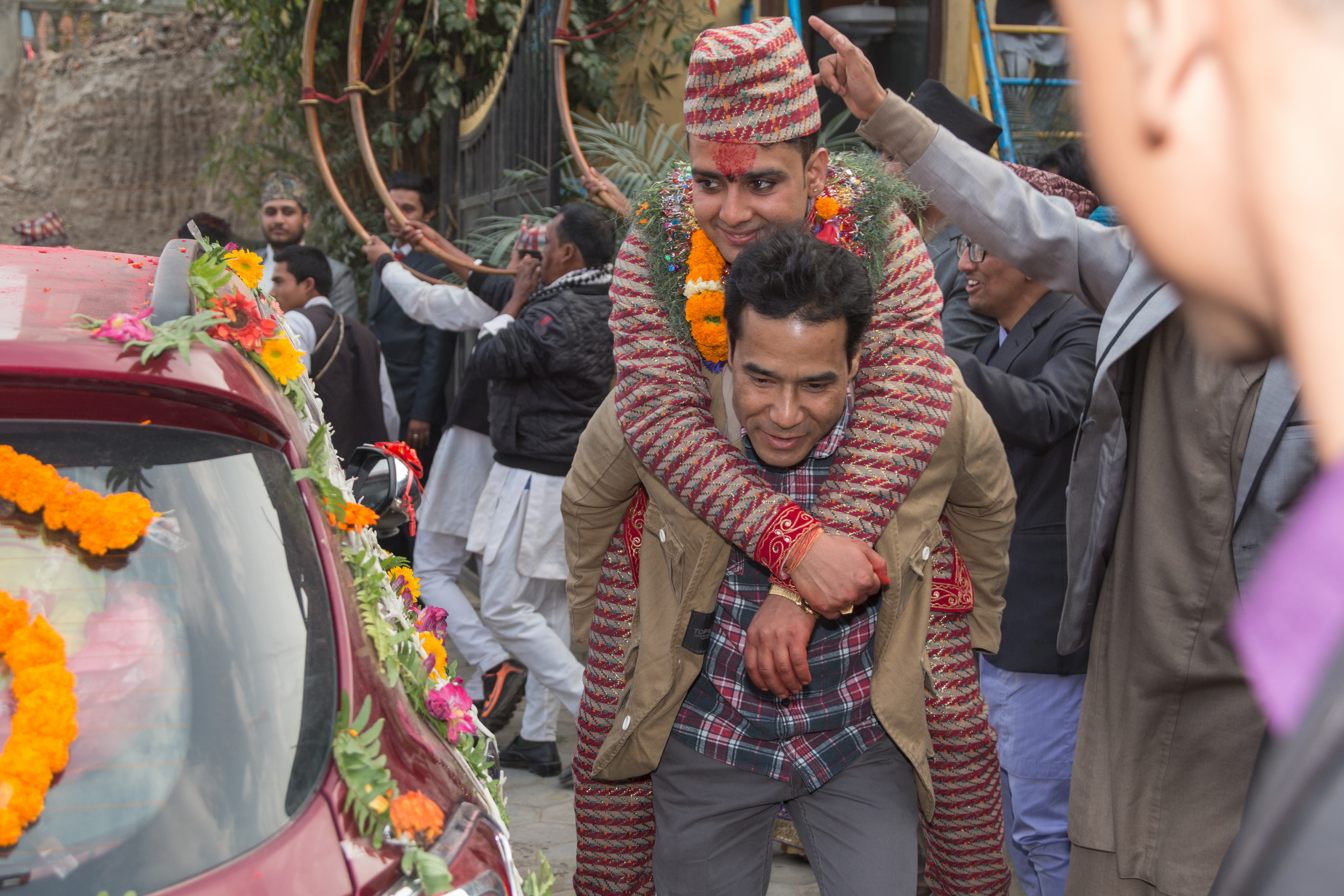
Procession of Nepali Hindu Wedding; Groom being carried by a bride brother or relatives

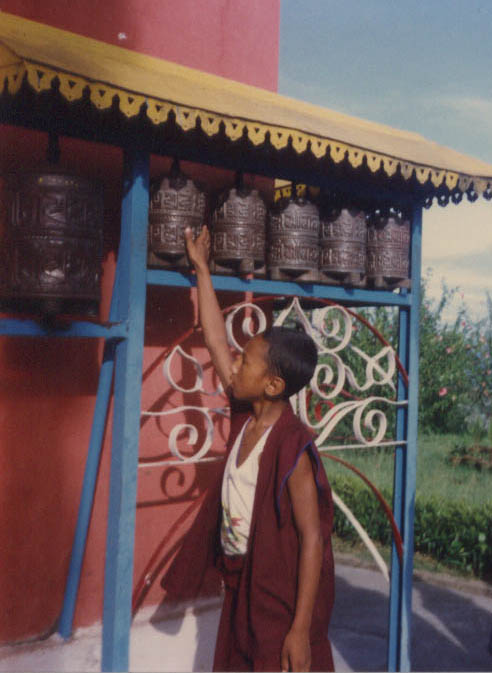
A Buddhist monastery in southern Nepal.

== Festivals and celebrations ==
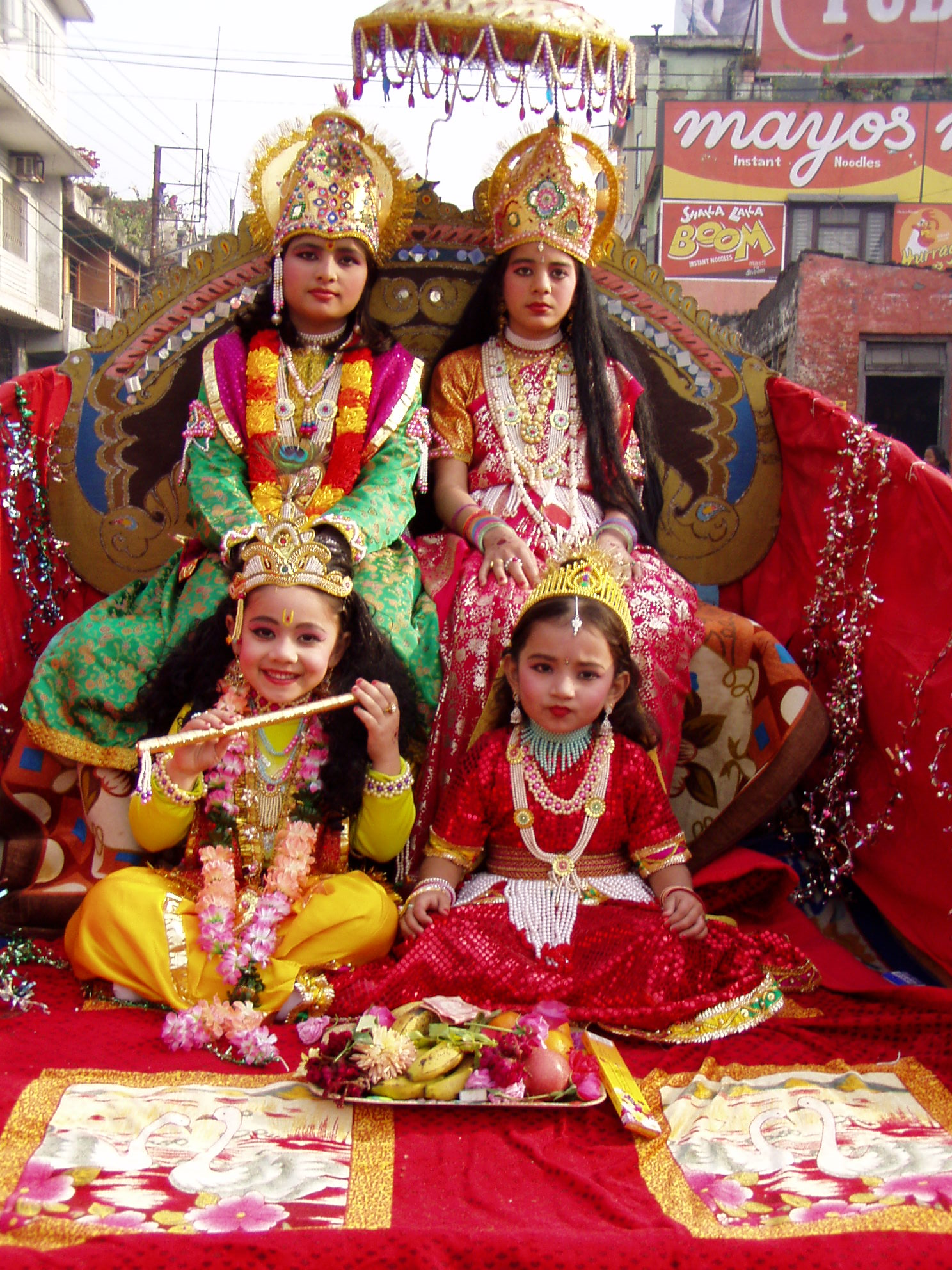
Costumed Hindu girls of Kathmandu during festival time in Nepal

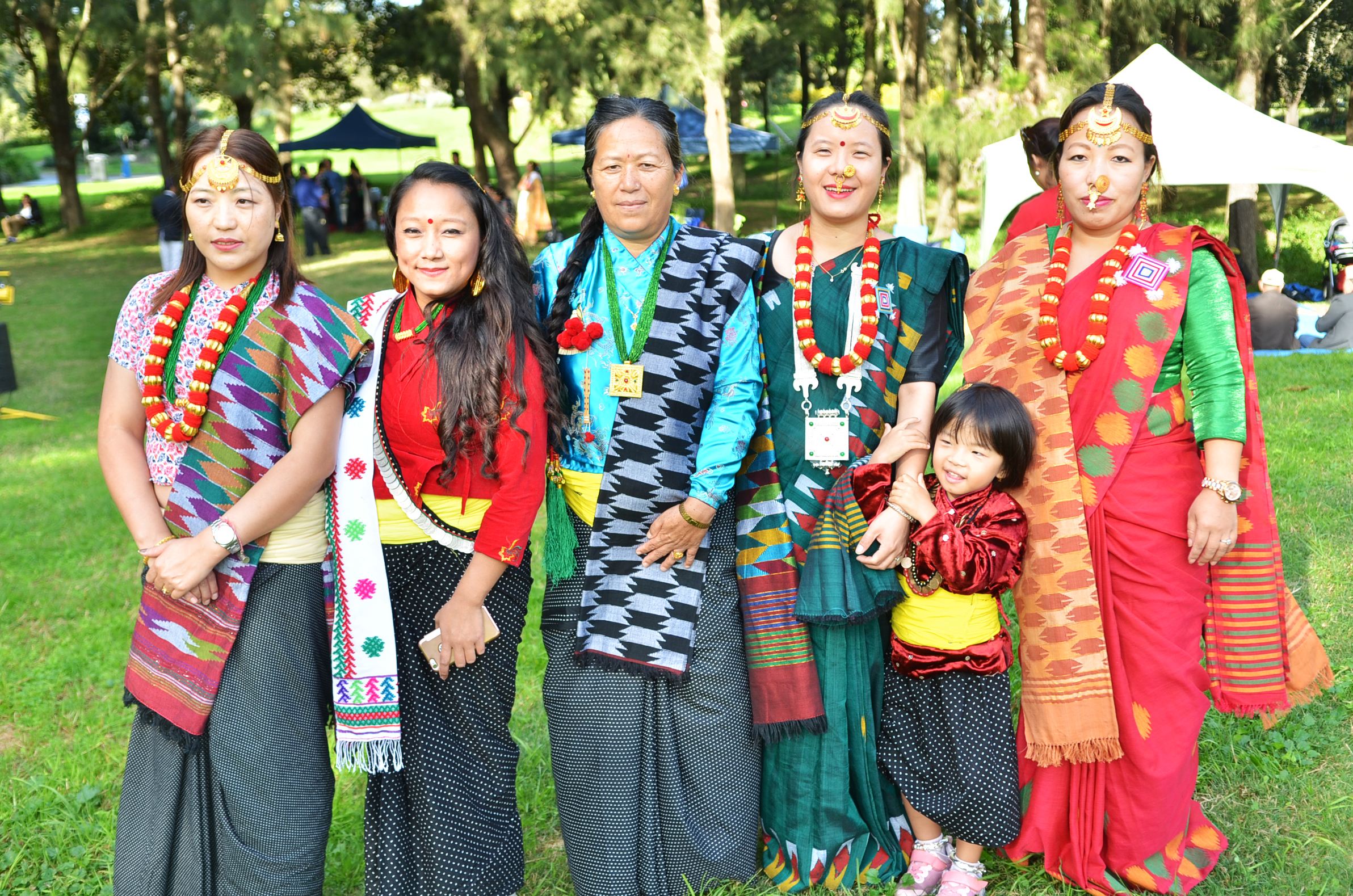
Women in cultural costume at Ubhauli Kirati festival 2017 at Gough Whitlam Park, Earlwood

Several of the festivals of Nepal last from one to several days. As a predominantly Hindu and Buddhist nation, most of the Nepalese festivals are religious ones. The festivals of Nepal have their roots in Hinduism as more than 80% of the population of the country is Hindu. Buddhism, the second-largest religion of the nation which accounts for 9% of the population, has influenced the cultural festivals of Nepal. Dashain or Vijaya Dashami is the longest and the most important festival of Nepal. Generally, Dashain falls in late September to mid-October, right after the end of the monsoon season. It is "a day of Victory over Demons". The Newars celebrate the festival as Mohani, Tihar or Dipawali, Holi, Saraswati Puja, Rakshabandhan, Janmashtami, Gai Jatra, Nag Panchami, Teej, Chhath, Kartik Poornima, Maghe Sankranti, or Makar Sankranti, Maha Shivratri and Chhechu are widely celebrated important festivals of Nepal. New Year's Day of the lunar calendar Nepal Sambat occurs in November. Several Jatras take place throughout the year and public holidays are declared in some regions.

Other important festivals include Buddha Purnima (the celebration of the birth of Buddha) Maha Shivaratri (a festival of Lord Shiva) and during Maha Shivaratri festivities, some people consume excessive drinks and smoke charas. Sherpas, mostly located at higher altitudes and in the Mount Everest region, celebrate Mani Rimdu, for the good of the world.

Most festivals include dancing and music, and a variety of special foods are consumed during festivals and on special occasions.

The Sagan ceremony is the ritualized presentation of five food items (boiled egg, smoked fish, meat, lentil cake and rice wine) to a person which is done to bring good fortune as per Tantric tradition.

== Architecture and archaeology ==
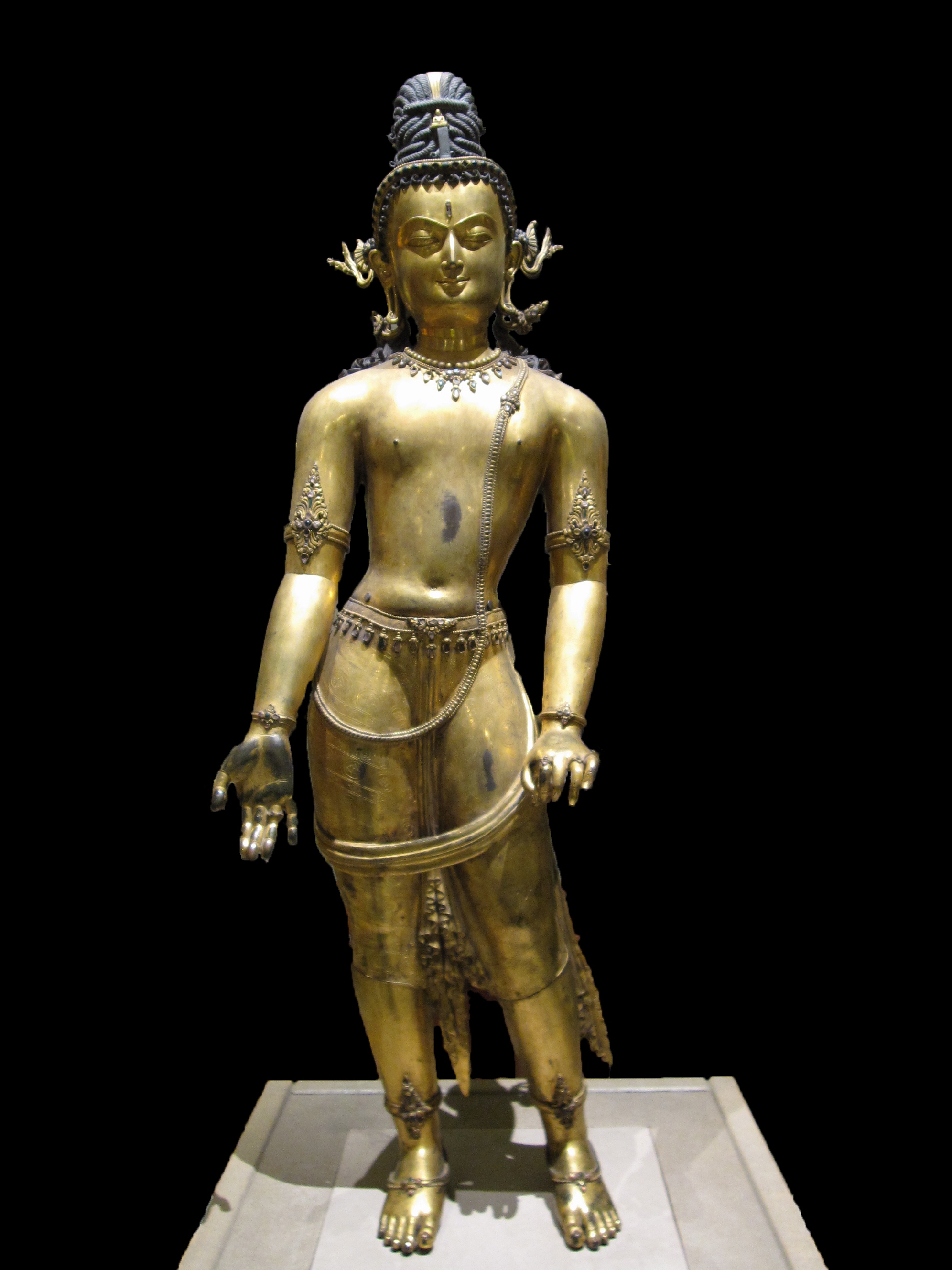
Statue of the Bodhisattva Avalokiteshvara, gilded bronze, Nepal, 16th century CE

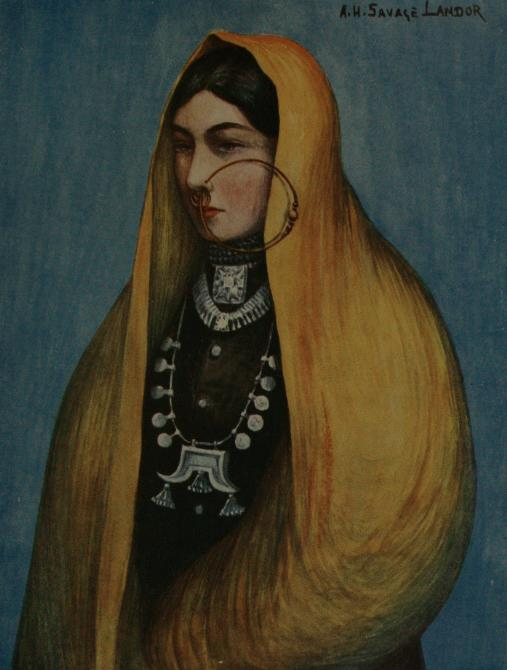
A 1905 painting of Nepalese woman

Nepal Sampada Sangha (Nepal Heritage Society) has compiled an inventory of 1,262 significant architectural and archeological sites in Nepal outside Kathmandu Valley.

== Sports ==
The government declared volleyball as the national game of the country. Before it used to be dandi biyo.

A Cabinet meeting held at the Prime Minister Pushpa Kamal Dahal's residence in Baluwatar took the decision. The Ministry of Youth and Sports had put the proposal to declare volleyball as the national game. Nepal Volleyball Association had been demanding that the sport, which is played in all 75 districts of the country, should be the national game.

National Sports Council's former Member Secretary Yubaraj Lama had initiated the process of deciding the national game, while the current Member Secretary Keshab Kumar Bista had recommended for the national game.

== Gallery ==
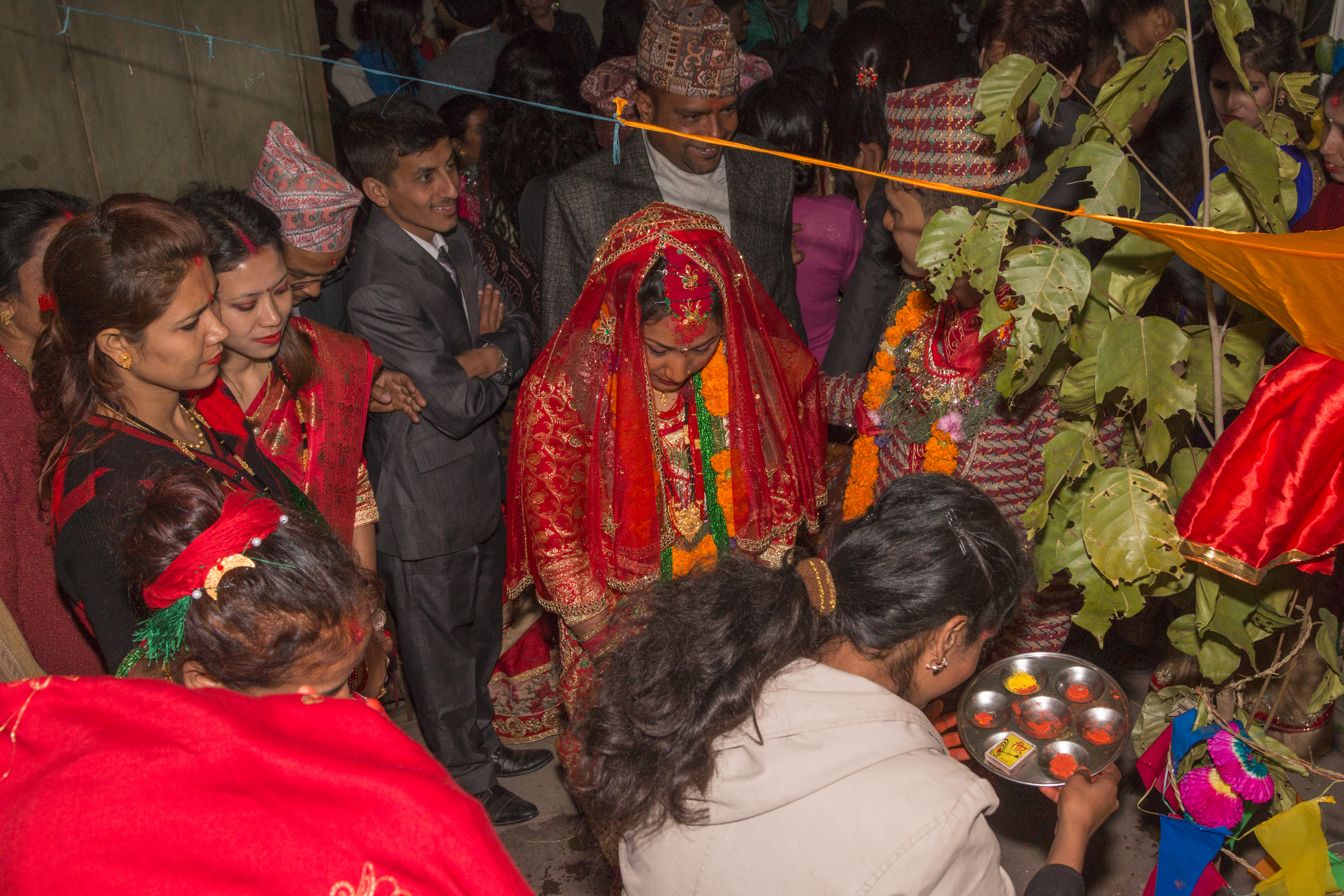
Procession of Nepali Pahadi Hindu Wedding

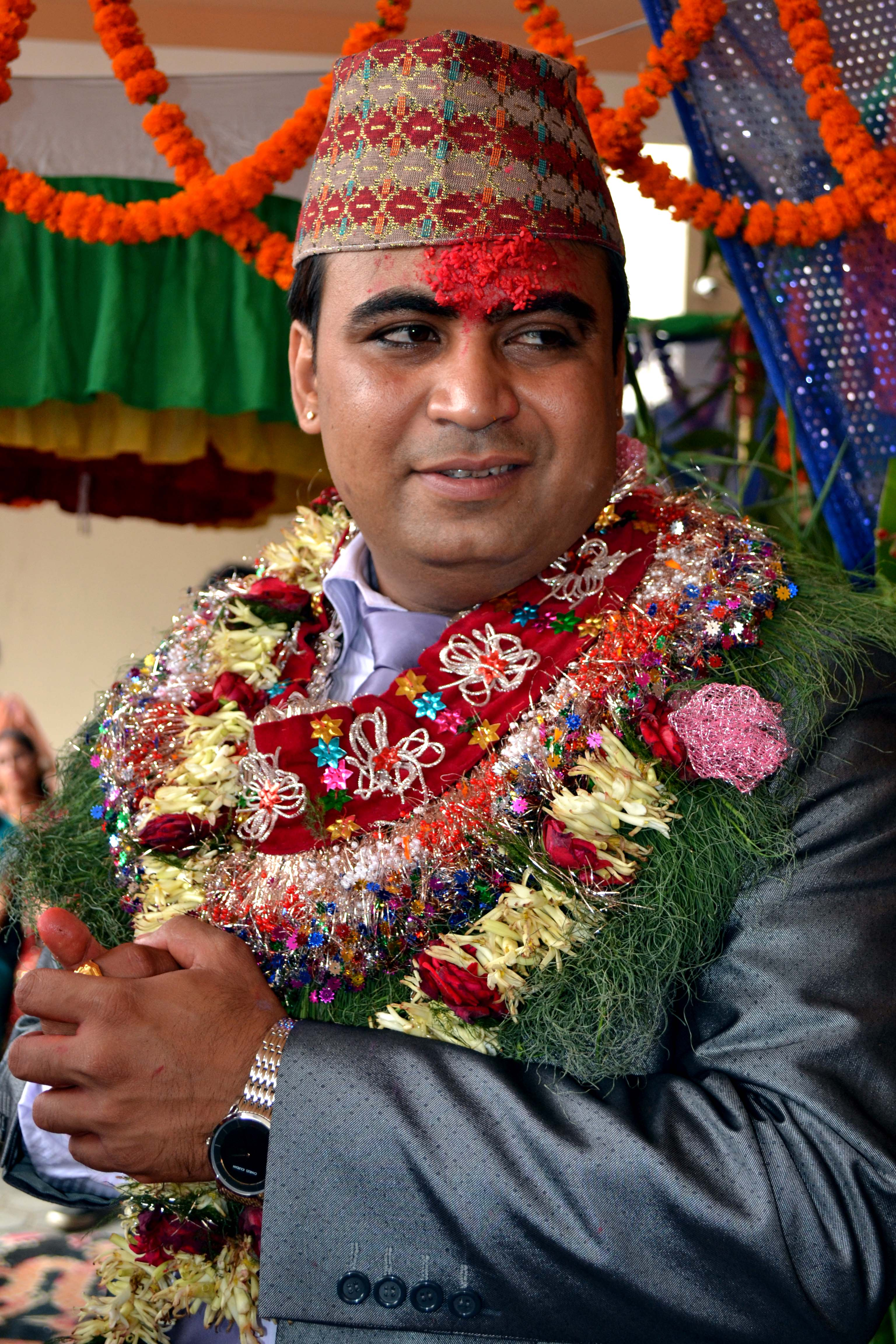
Nepali Pahadi groom

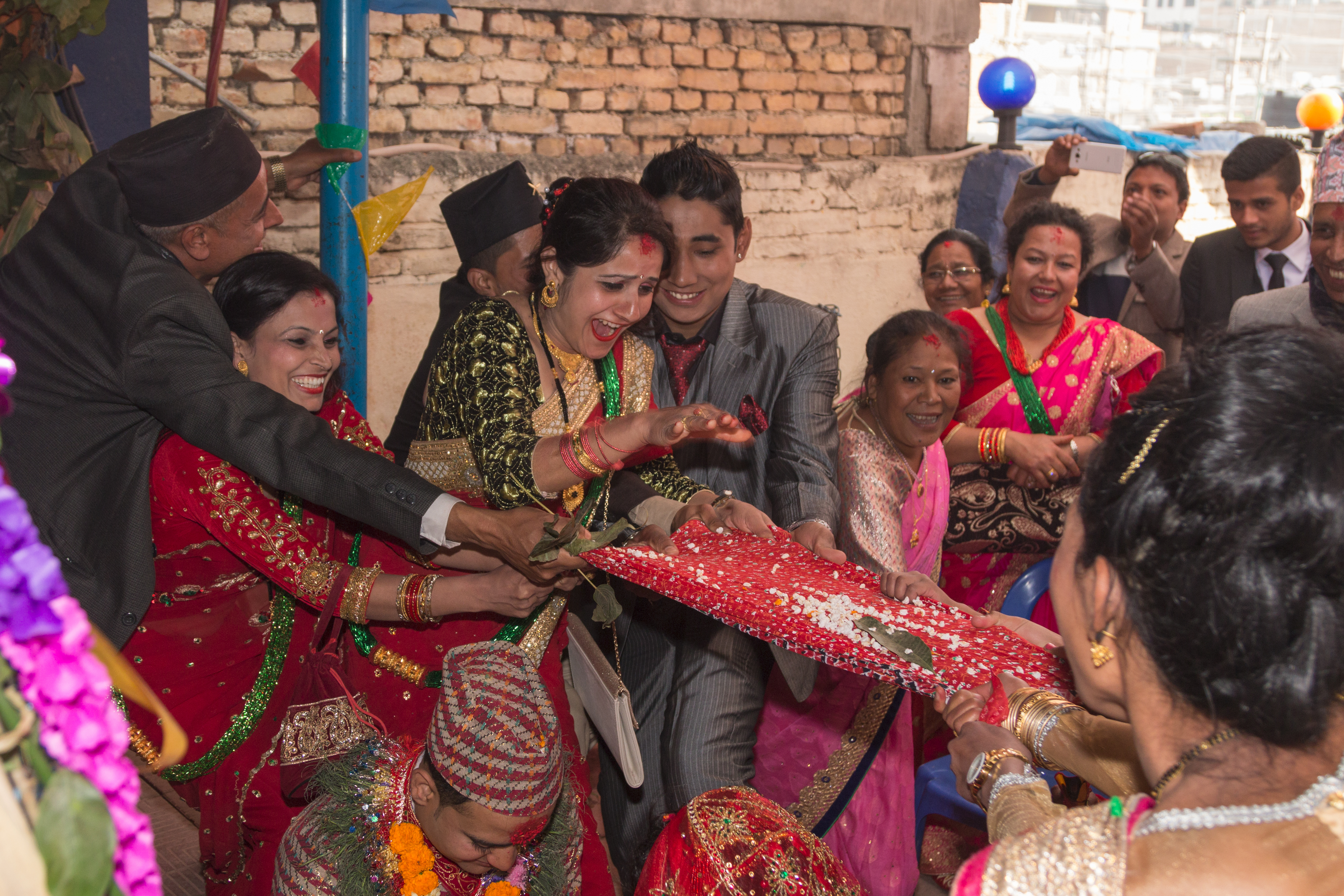
Procession of Nepali Hindu Wedding

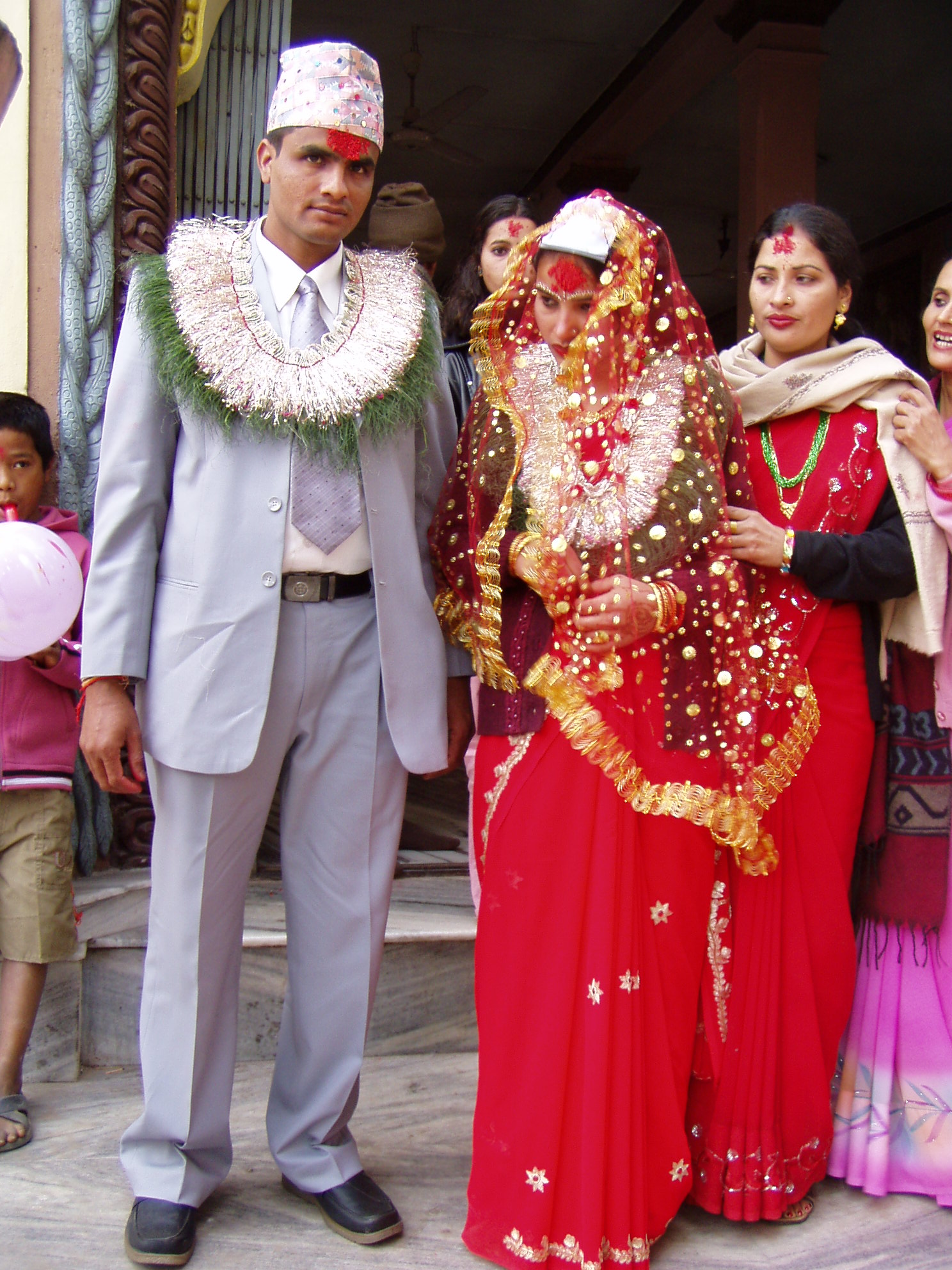
Nepali Pahadi Hindu marriage at Narayangadh, Chitawan

== See also ==
- Boudhanath
- Chitrakar
- Cinema of Nepal
- Dhunge Dhara
- Languages of Nepal
- Media of Nepal
- Menstruation hut
- Music of Nepal
- Naga Panchami
- National Museum of Nepal
- Nepal Bhasa literature
- Nepalese architecture
- Nepalese cuisine
- Nepali literature
- Newa art
- Religion in Nepal
- Thangka
- Traditional Newar clothing
