= Chhechu =

Ceremony of the Tamang communities in Nepal

Chhechu is a ceremony of the Tamang communities in Nepal that takes place over the course of eleven days, from the 5th day of the Hindu lunar calendar (Panchami) to the full moon (Purnima). It contains sportive plays (tsema), exorcisms, and rituals. Chhechu takes place northwest of Kathmandu Valley of Nepal. Eleven tsema, and three exorcisms are performed.

== Description ==
The whole community participates in a variety of ways. The Buddhist lamas produce power (wang) while the villagers produce tsema gren. Tsema gren is accomplished by performing skits such as the ones that the elders put on, which is a friendly mockery of the upper and dominant classes of Nepal. There are also skits that contain information about the past.

Throughout the ritual there are different exorcisms performed, intended to remove threats to the community. There are large-scale performances in Mhanegang during which villagers exorcise at regular intervals. Other places perform separate two-day exorcisms several days in advance of the performance in Mhanegang. At this time, the people throw effigies of evil off a cliff. Lamas lead men and boys as they wave spears and swords around, scattering dust as they circle a raised central altar. This is done to eliminate the three evils: the inherent incompleteness of exchange, cannibalistic greed, and unrestrained eros.

The exorcism of Kãli mãì involves the entire village and is done in order to remove the fury of Kãli mãì from the village, along with anything associated with her. Men with swords and women with weaving instruments dance around a large effigy constructed from bamboo. At dusk, the effigy is burned in a huge flash fire. When this is done, men thrust their spears upwards and the women bring their materials to their bodies to sexually explicit refrains. They attempt to negate incestuous thoughts which are said to please Kãli mãì.

== Last day ==
On the last day of Chhechu, the Buddhist lamas distribute dough powder balls (Wang ro ro) to the principal headman, then his allies, their wives, and finally to the villagers.
