= Newar traditional clothing =

Traditional clothing of Nepal

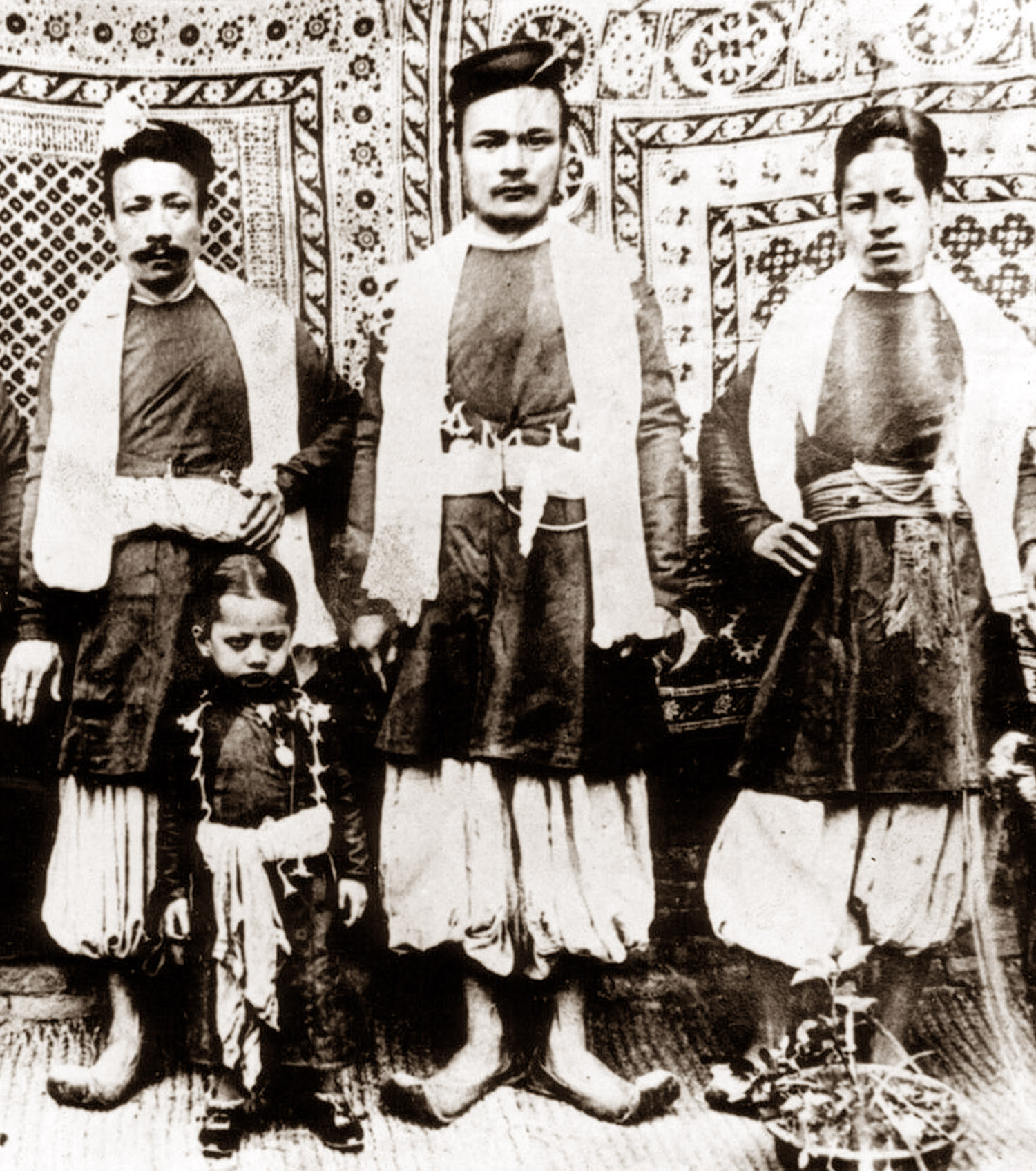
Men in sayn kaytā trousers, circa 1920s

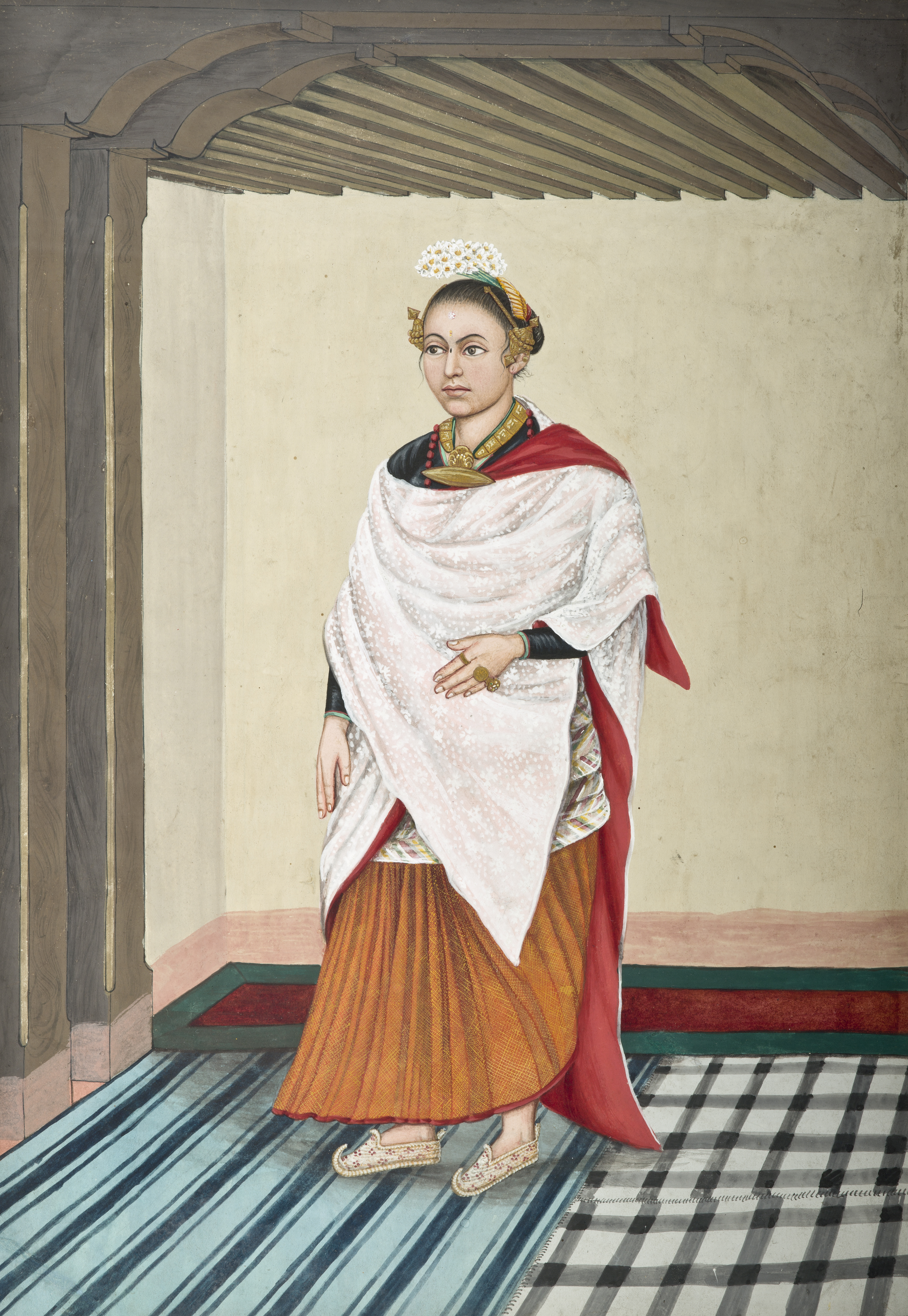
Newar woman in parsi, circa 18-1900

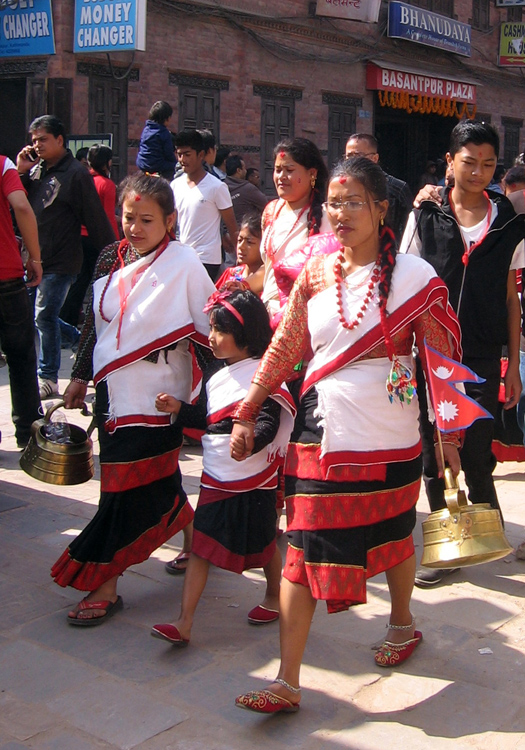
Hāku patāsi

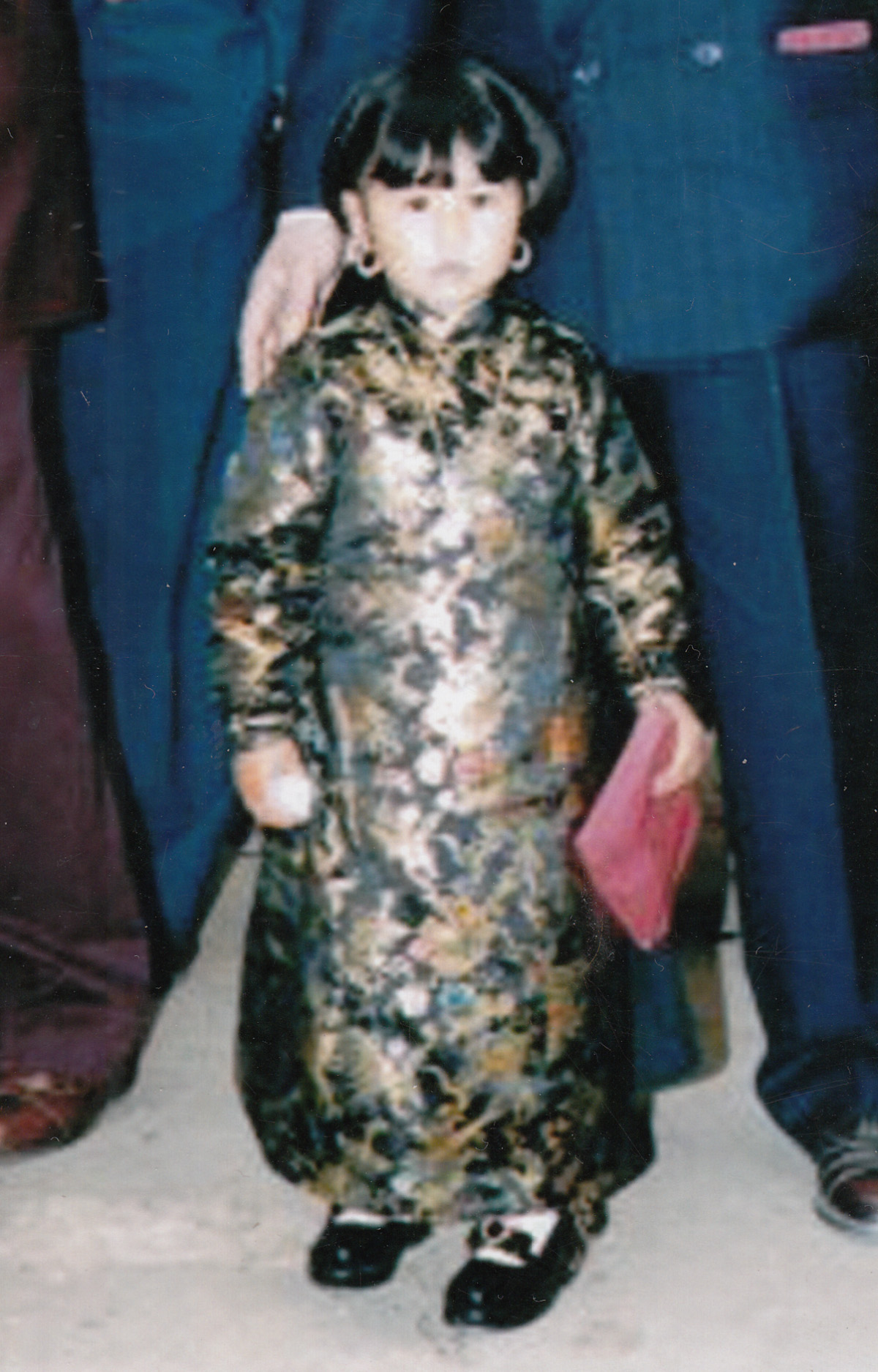
Bhāntānlan

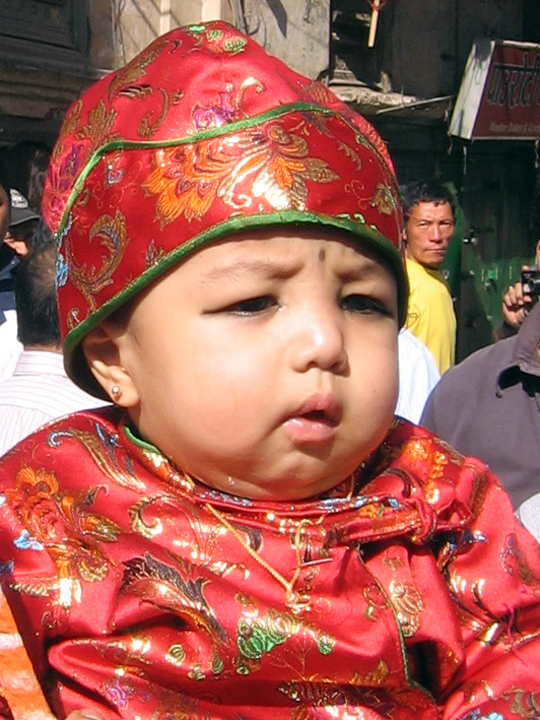
Child in Janku attire

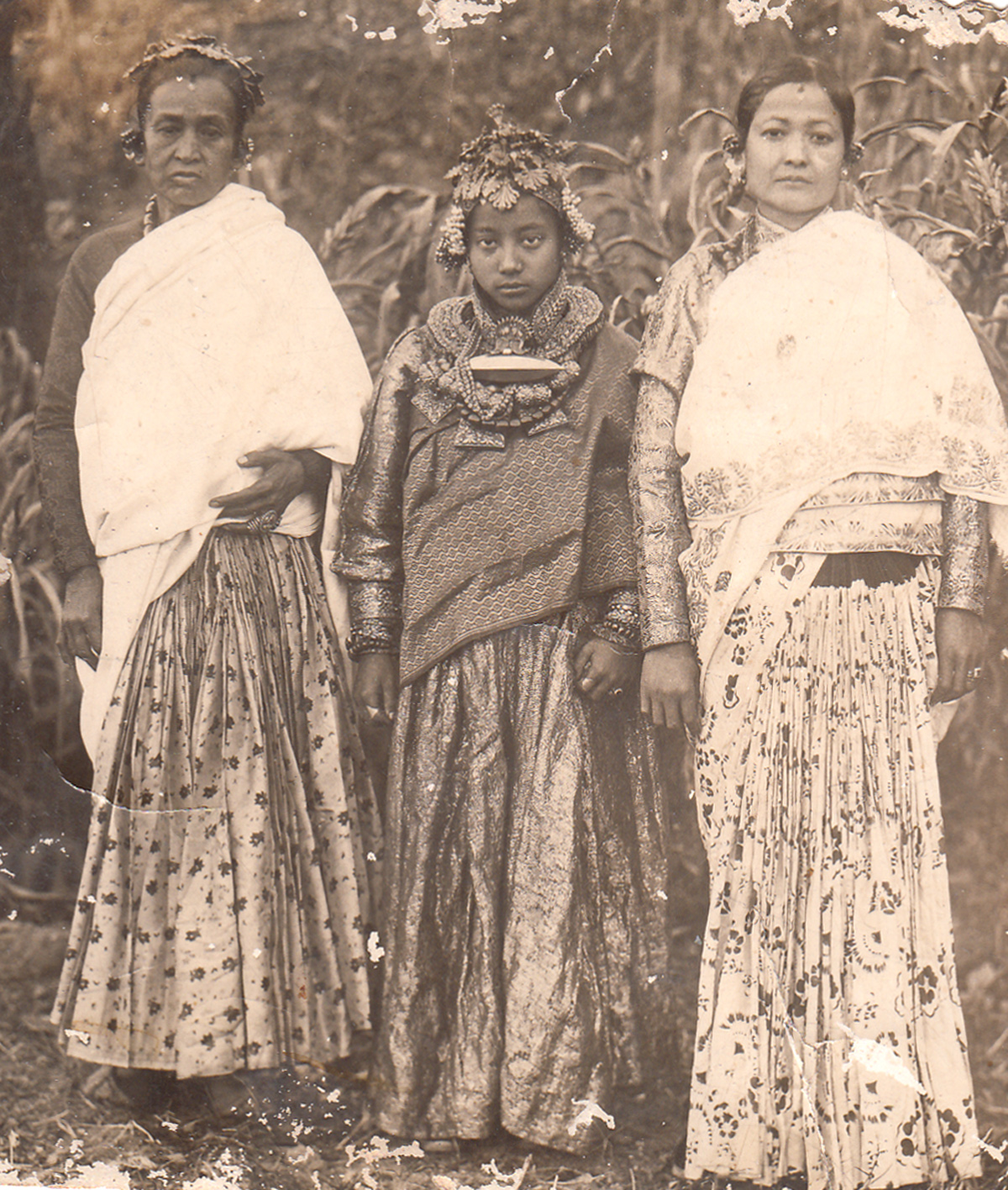
Newar bride flanked by two women in parsi, 1941

Traditional Newar clothing (Nepali: नेवार समुदायमा भएको संस्कृति पहिरन) refers to the everyday clothes worn by the Newar people of Nepal who are indigenous to the Kathmandu Valley and surrounding regions. The garments are associated with the old aristocracy, merchants, farmers, craftsmen and professionals.

Most of the clothes are made of homespun. Weaving was a major industry in the Kathmandu Valley. Many people had handlooms in their homes, and in the old days a spinning wheel and a seed separator were one of the required bridal gifts. People wove cloth for personal use or for sale. The finished cloth was sent to be dyed to the dyers who made up a caste group called Chhipa (now Ranjit or Ranjitkar). The practice of home weaving continued till the 1960s. Women warping the yarn on the streets were a common sight till those times.

A description of the clothes worn by ordinary Newars in the early 18th century can be found in the travelogue left by Italian Jesuit Ippolito Desideri. In 1721, Desideri visited Kathmandu on his way from Tibet to India. Describing the clothes of the local people, he has written that they wear a woollen or cotton jacket reaching to the knees and long trousers down to their ankles. They wear a red cap on their head, and slippers on their feet, he wrote.

In 1973, the government of Nepal issued a postage stamp showing a painting of the traditional costume of the Kathmandu Valley as part of a series of stamps of the traditional clothes worn in various regions of Nepal.

== Tapālan ==
Men's common costume consists of a long shirt called tapālan (Nepal Bhasa: तपालं) and tight fitting trousers known as suruwā (सुरुवा:). A waistcoat and coat may be worn over the shirt. Today, the garment is worn during special occasions, official functions and festivals while it is still everyday wear for many among the older generation. Men dress in tapālan and suruwā and women wear the hāku patāsi when taking part in the New Year's Day parade of Nepal Sambat. This traditional dress is also worn during wedding processions.

== Hāku patāsi ==
Women wear black cotton saris with a red border known as hāku patāsi (हाकु पतासि) or hāku parsi (हाकु पर्सि). It is still widely used especially among farmer women as everyday wear and is the most popular dress during festive occasions. A blouse fastened with cloth ties called misālan (मिसालं) is worn with the sari. A shawl, gā (गा), is wrapped around the upper part of the body.

In 1973, Nepal's Postal Services Department issued a commemorative stamp of a woman and a man dressed in haku patāsi and tapālan to show the traditional clothing of the Kathmandu Valley. The stamp was part of a series on the costumes of various parts of Nepal.

== Sayn kaytā ==
Sayn kaytā (सँय कयता) are traditional men's trousers. They were worn mostly by the merchant and courtier classes till the 1930s. The baggy trousers are gathered at the knee and fastened with a piece of string. The trousers feature a drawstring tie waist. The material used to make the sayn kayta is raw silk. A pair requires 6 yards of material. The sayn kayta is worn with a long shirt which is held in place by cloth ties. A cotton cummerbund completes the set.

== Parsi ==
Some classes of Newar women wore plain or printed [sari]s known as parsi (पर्सि). It has many pleats which are gathered at the front and tied in a bunch with a piece of string. These saris were up to 20 yards long.

== Bhāntānlan ==
Girls wear an ankle-length tight-fitting gown known as bhāntānlan (भान्तांलं) which extends from the neck to the ankles. It is smitten at the sides to reveal the legs; the upper part is fastened with cloth ties. Drop crotch pants were another popular item of clothing for girls. They are worn with a knee-length dress.

== Ceremonial attire ==
Special costumes are worn during lifecycle ceremonies like Janku, a baby's first rice feeding, initiation rites, weddings, old-age rituals and investitures. A child undergoing his or her first rice feeding is dressed in a vest and cap made of brocade. Boys celebrating their coming-of-age ceremony wear a loincloth. For Buddhist boys, the corresponding right is Bare Chhuyegu which is an initiation into the monkhood, and they wear a monk's robe. Girls dress up in the fancy attire of silk and brocade in grown-up designs for their Ihi and Baray, two ceremonies they undergo before reaching their teens.

Priests wear ankle-length pleated gowns during special religious services. Caps, turbans and crowns are the headwear worn with ceremonial garments.

== Historical gallery ==
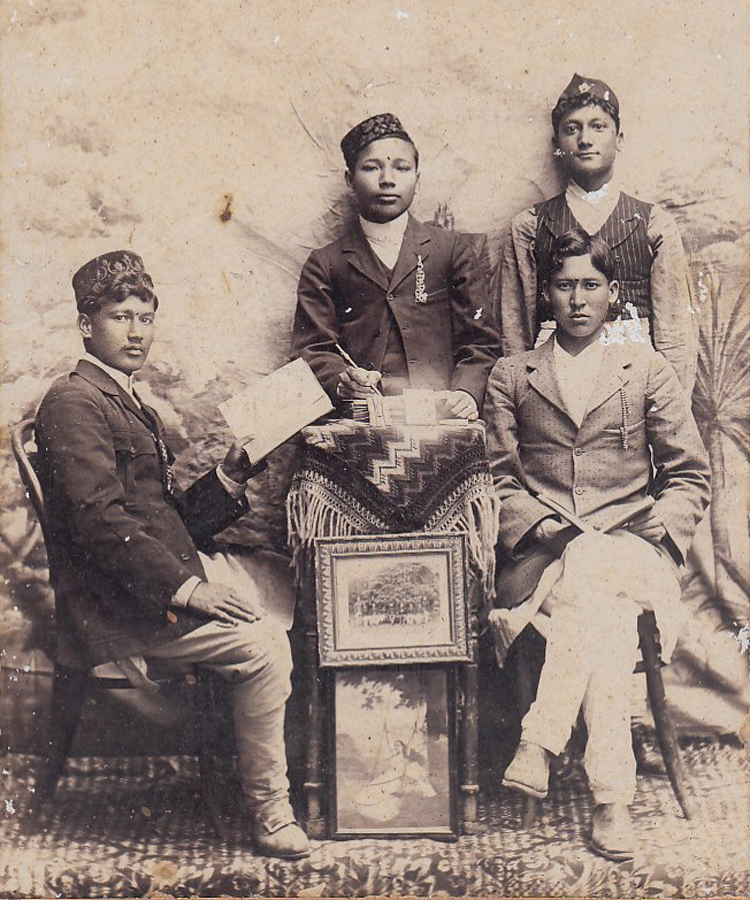
Men in local dress and Western coats, c. 1930

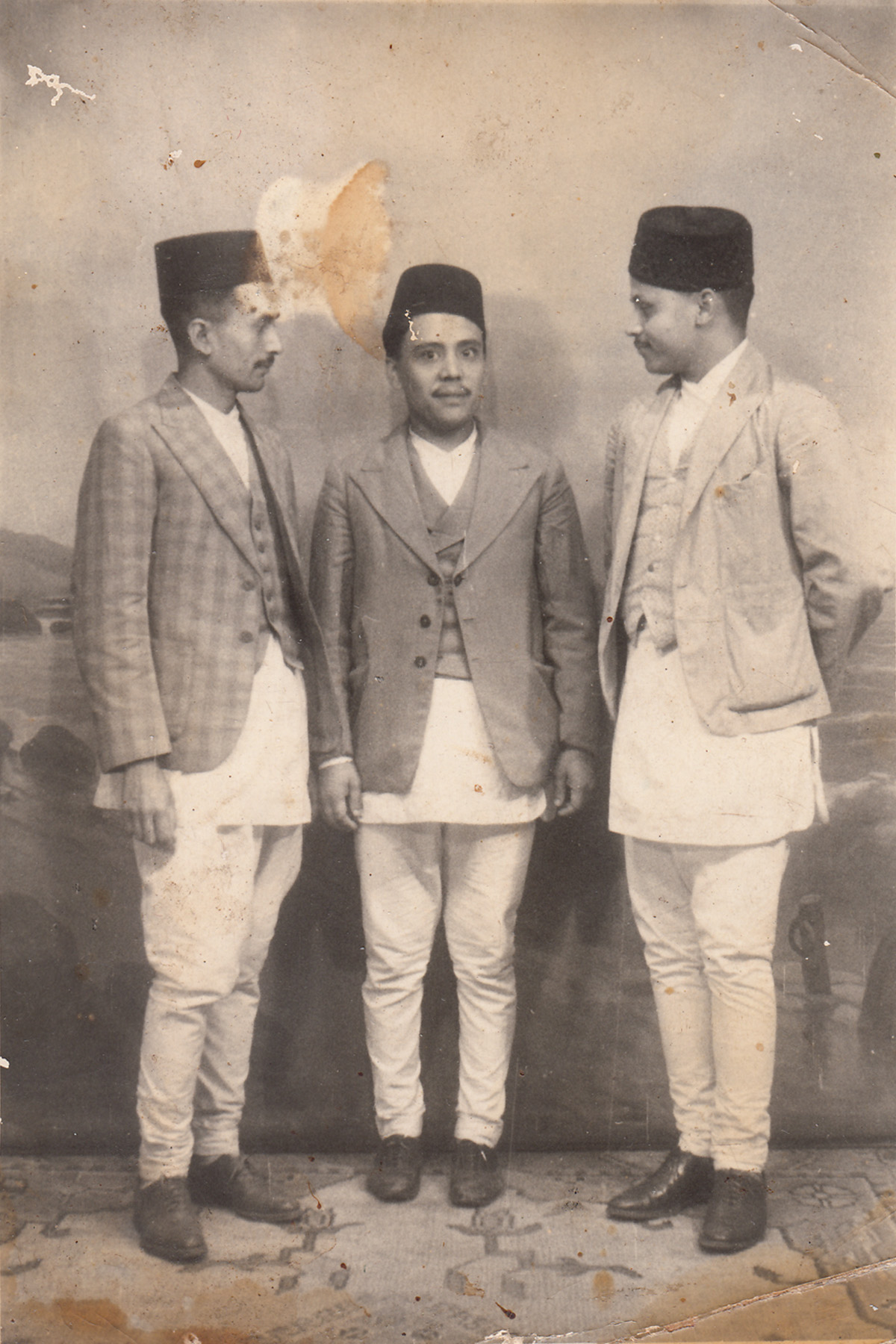
Men in tapālan and suruwā, c. 1940

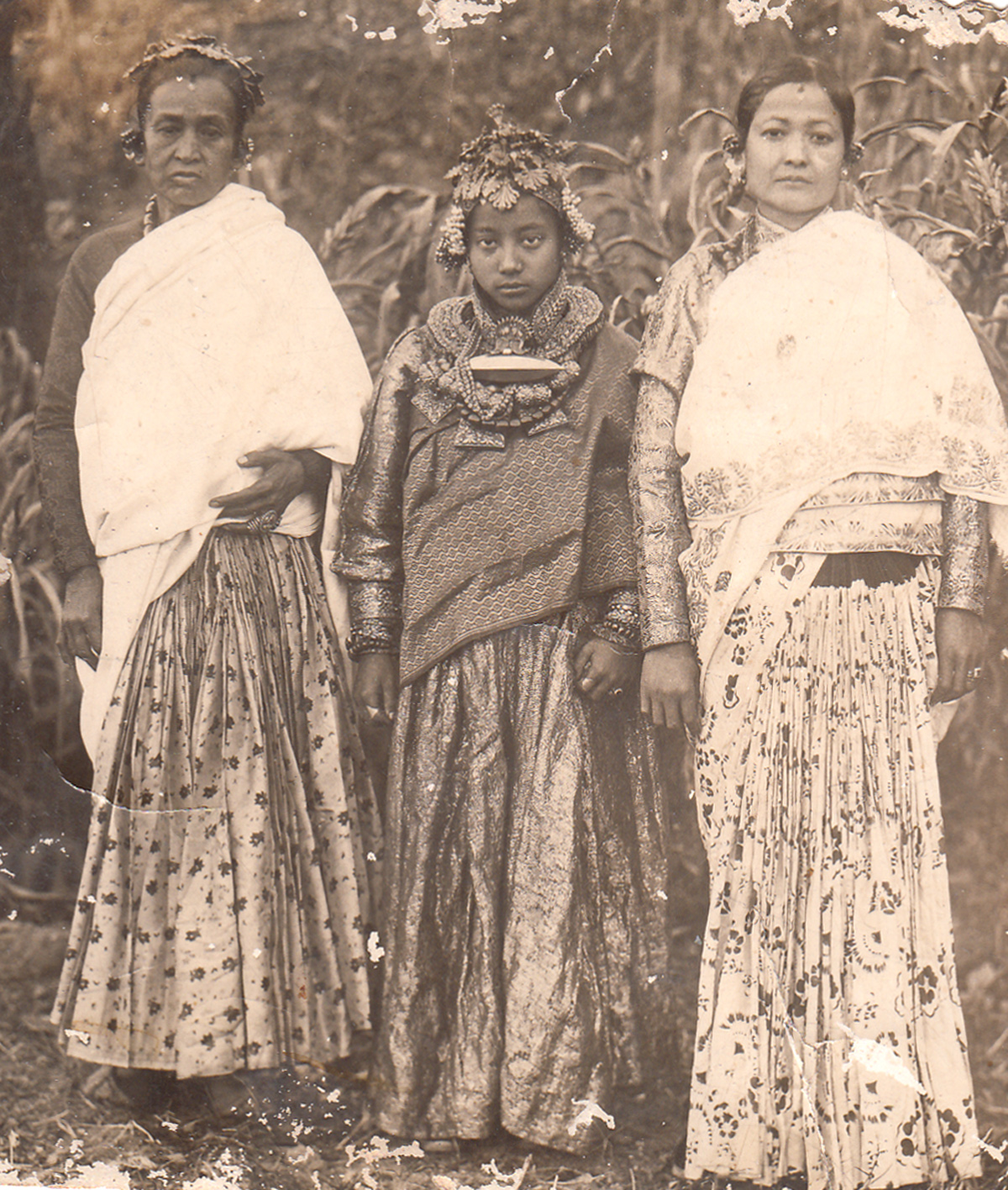
Bride flanked by two women in parsi, 1941

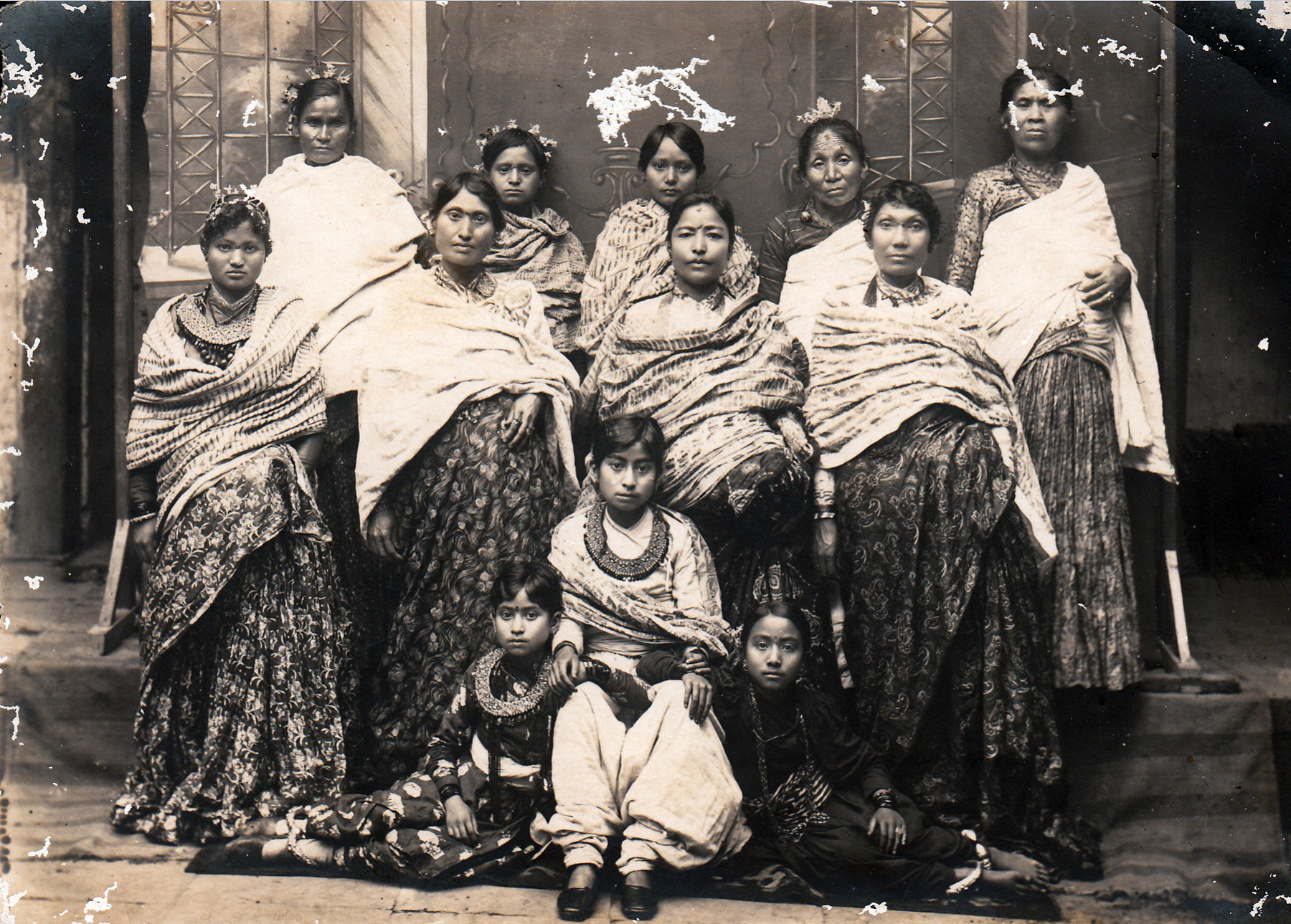
Group of women, c. 1930-1935

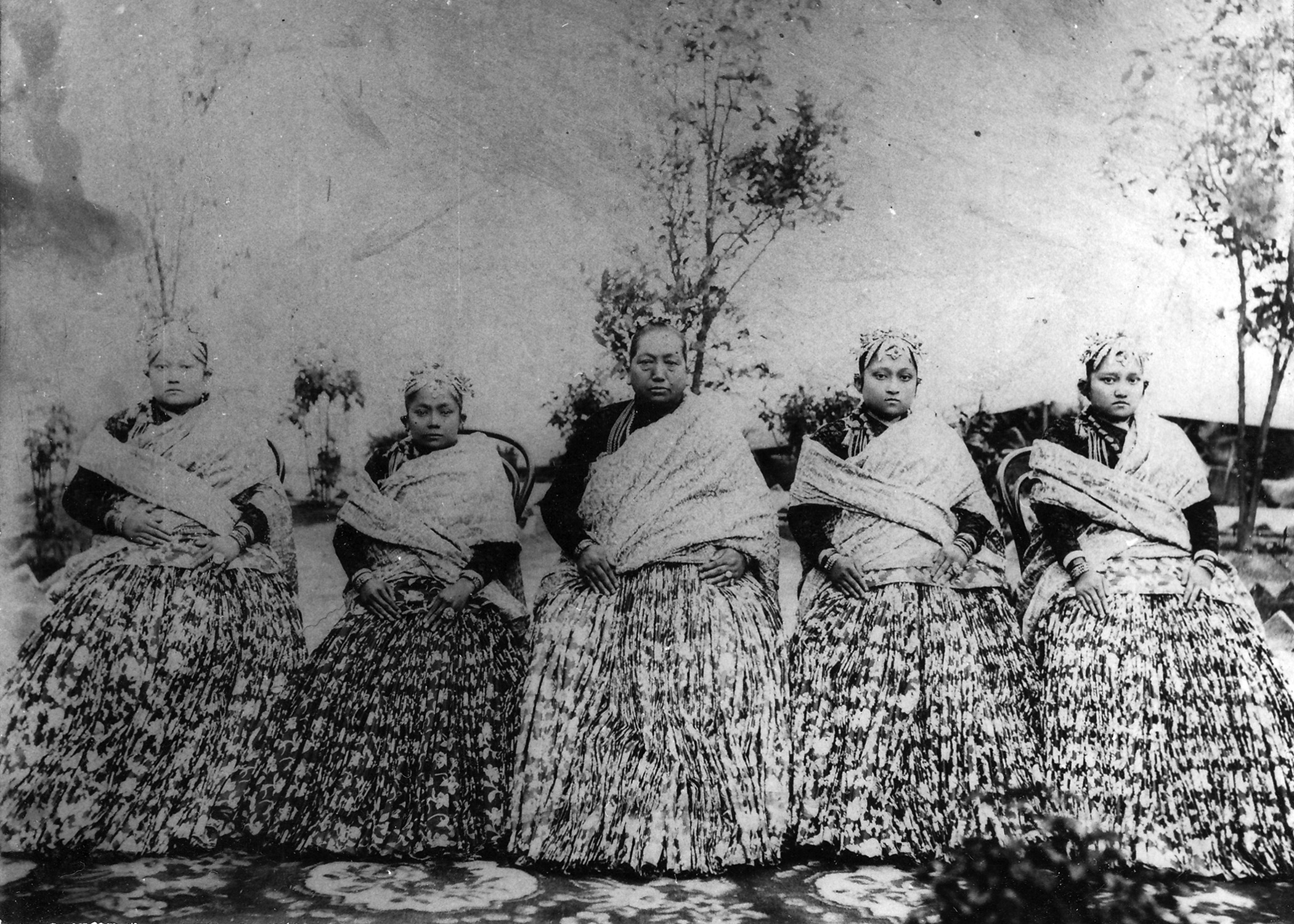
Manandhar women in Kathmandu, c. 1890

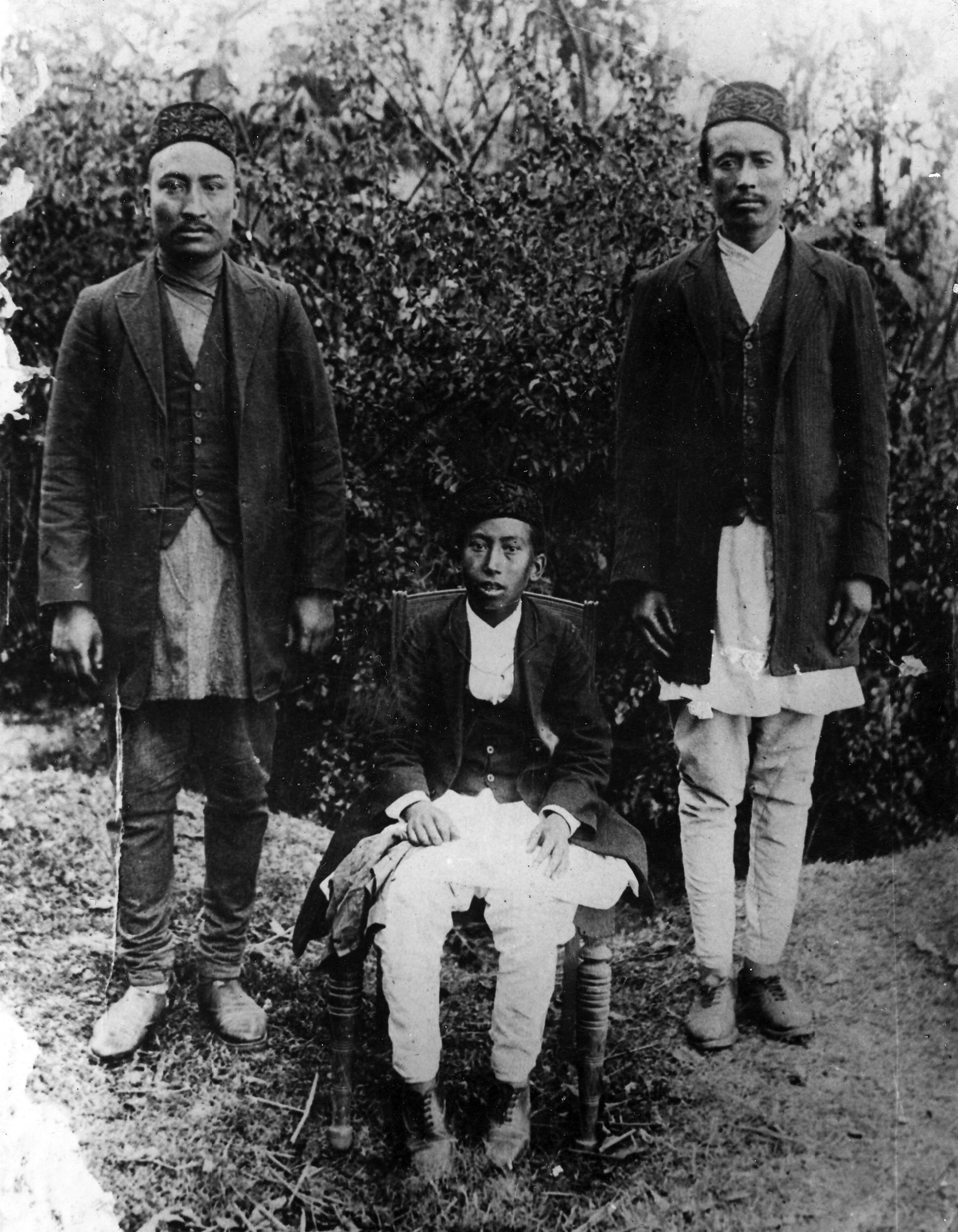
Manandhar men in Kathmandu, c. 1925

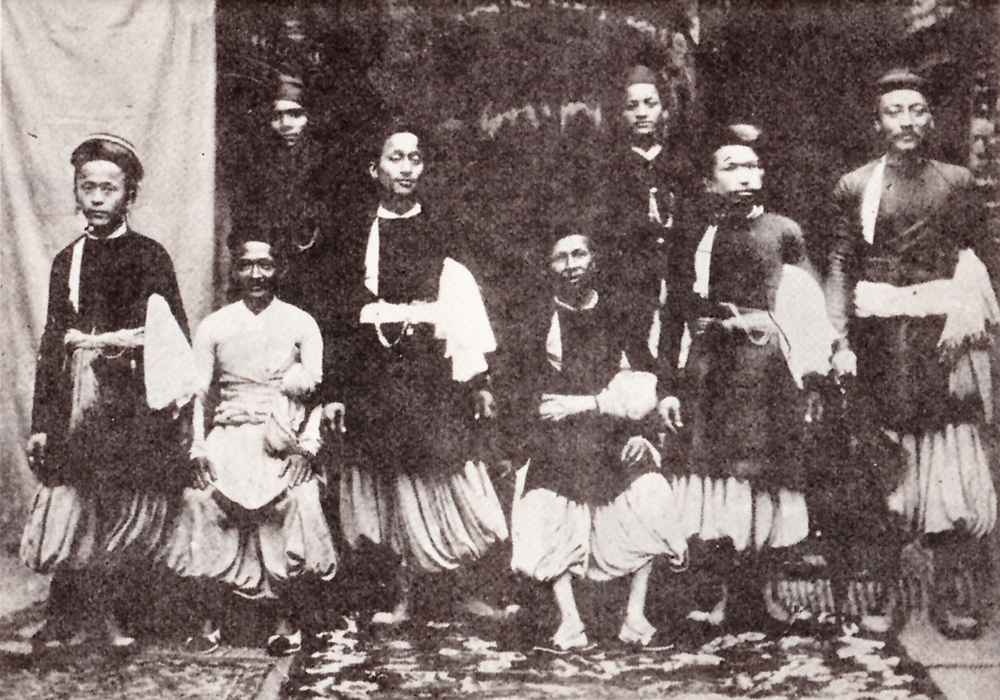
Mathema (subdivision: Chhathariya) men in sayn kaytā, 1890

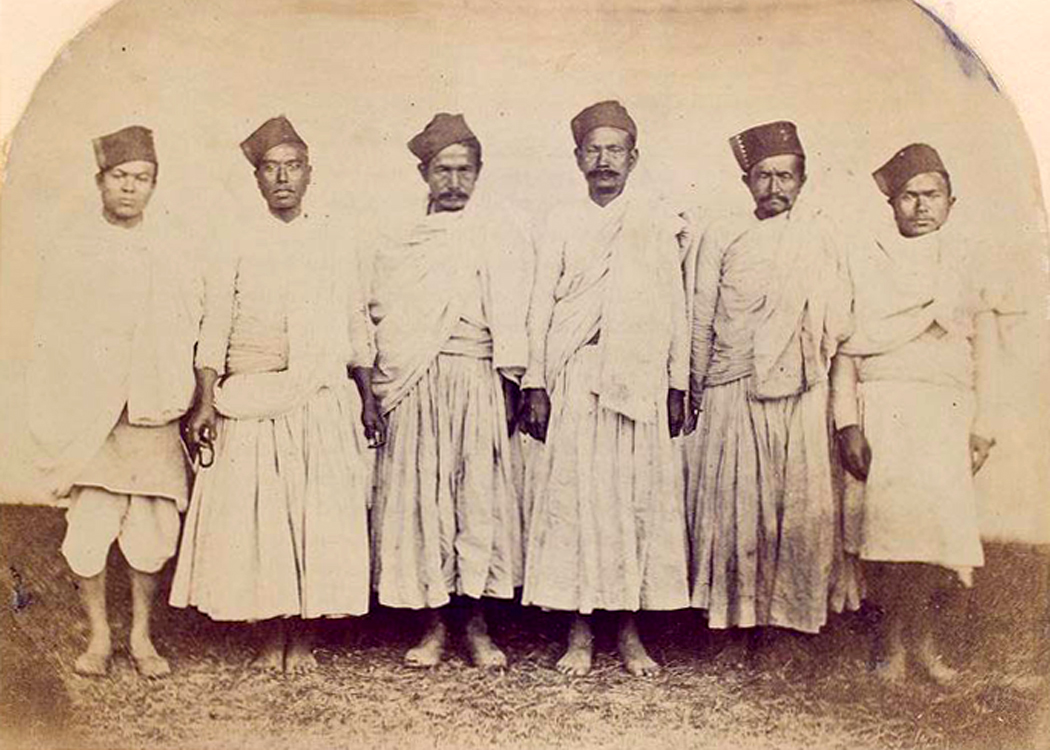
Shakyas in jāmā gowns, c. 1868-1875

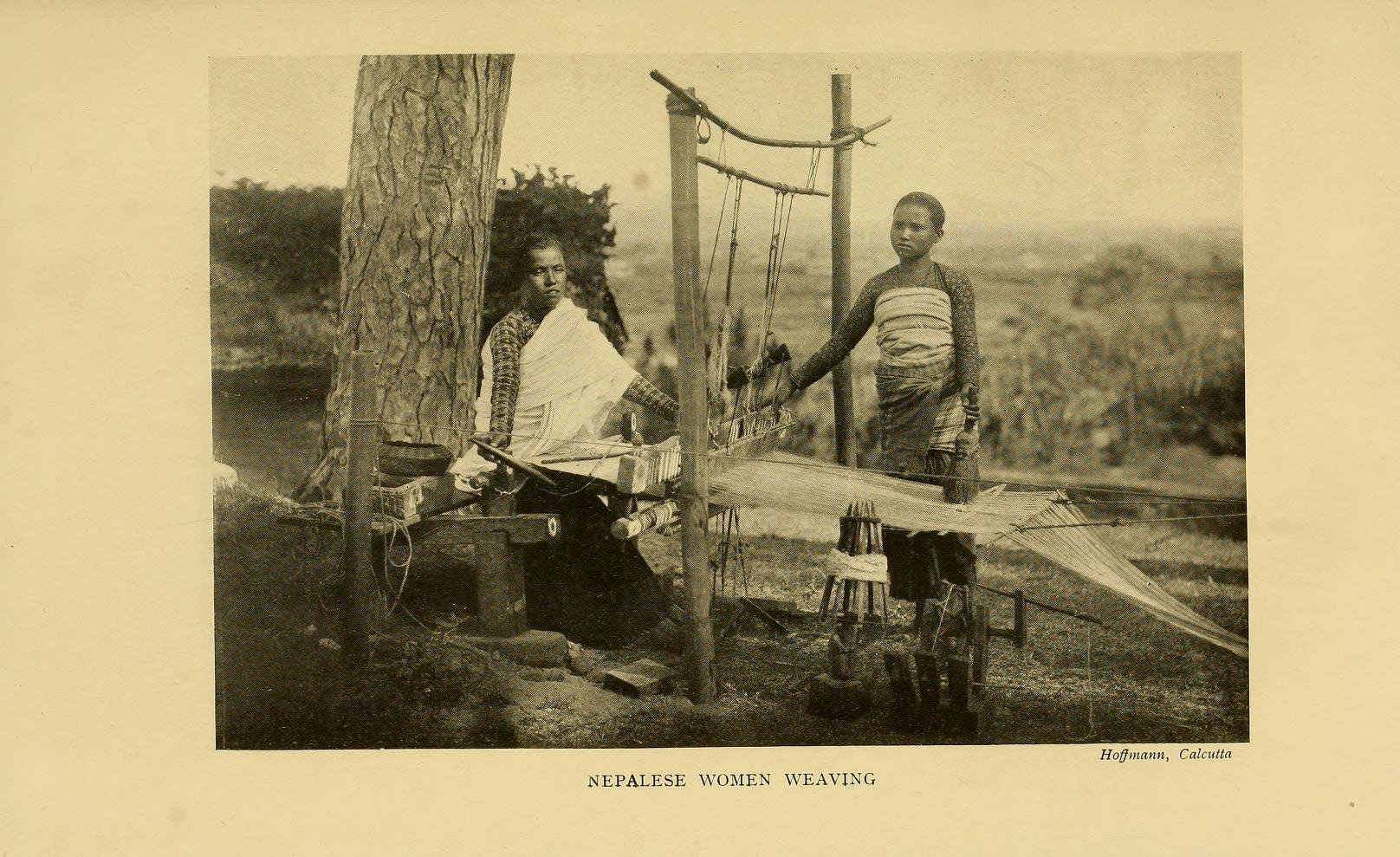
Newar women weavers in Kathmandu, 1894

Stamp showing traditional clothing of Kathmandu

== Modern gallery ==
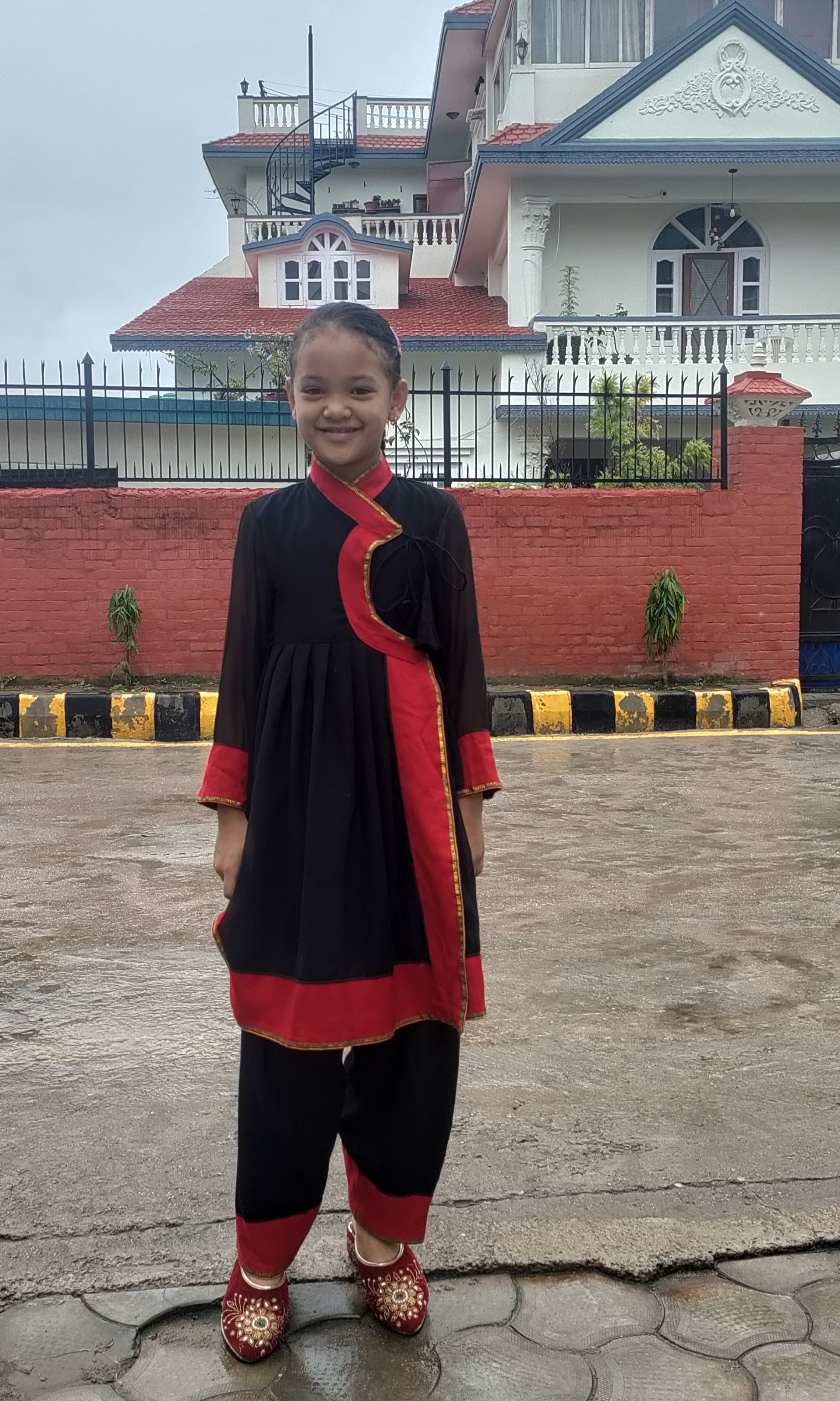
A girl is preparing to go to school in a Newari dress Tapaln

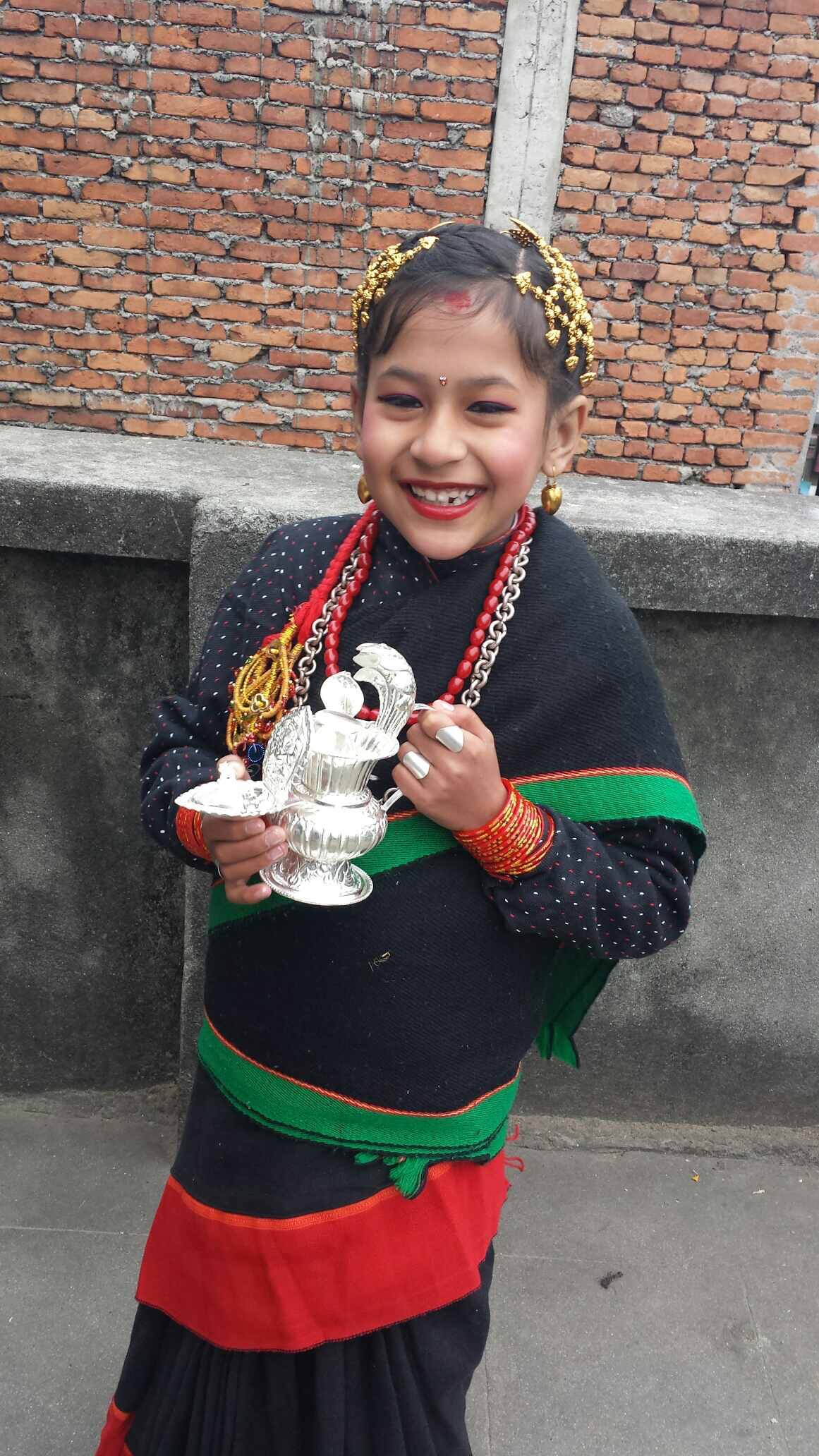
Newar girl in cultural dress

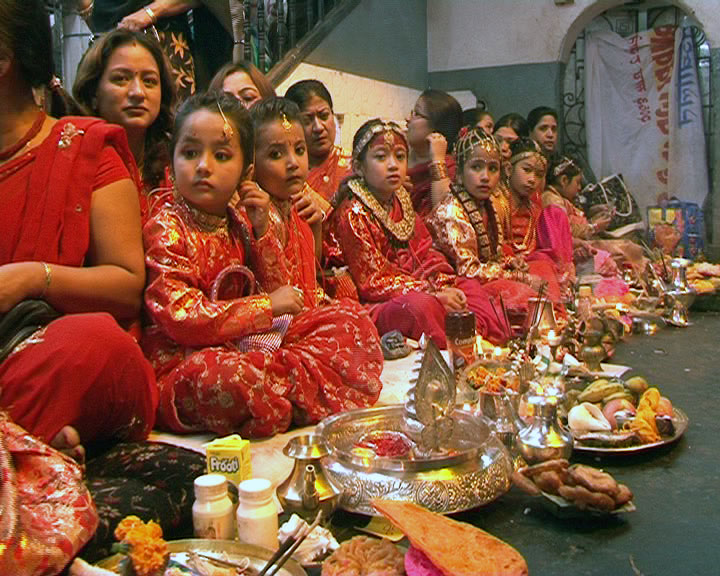
Newar children in Nepal performing Ihi, also known as Bel Marriage

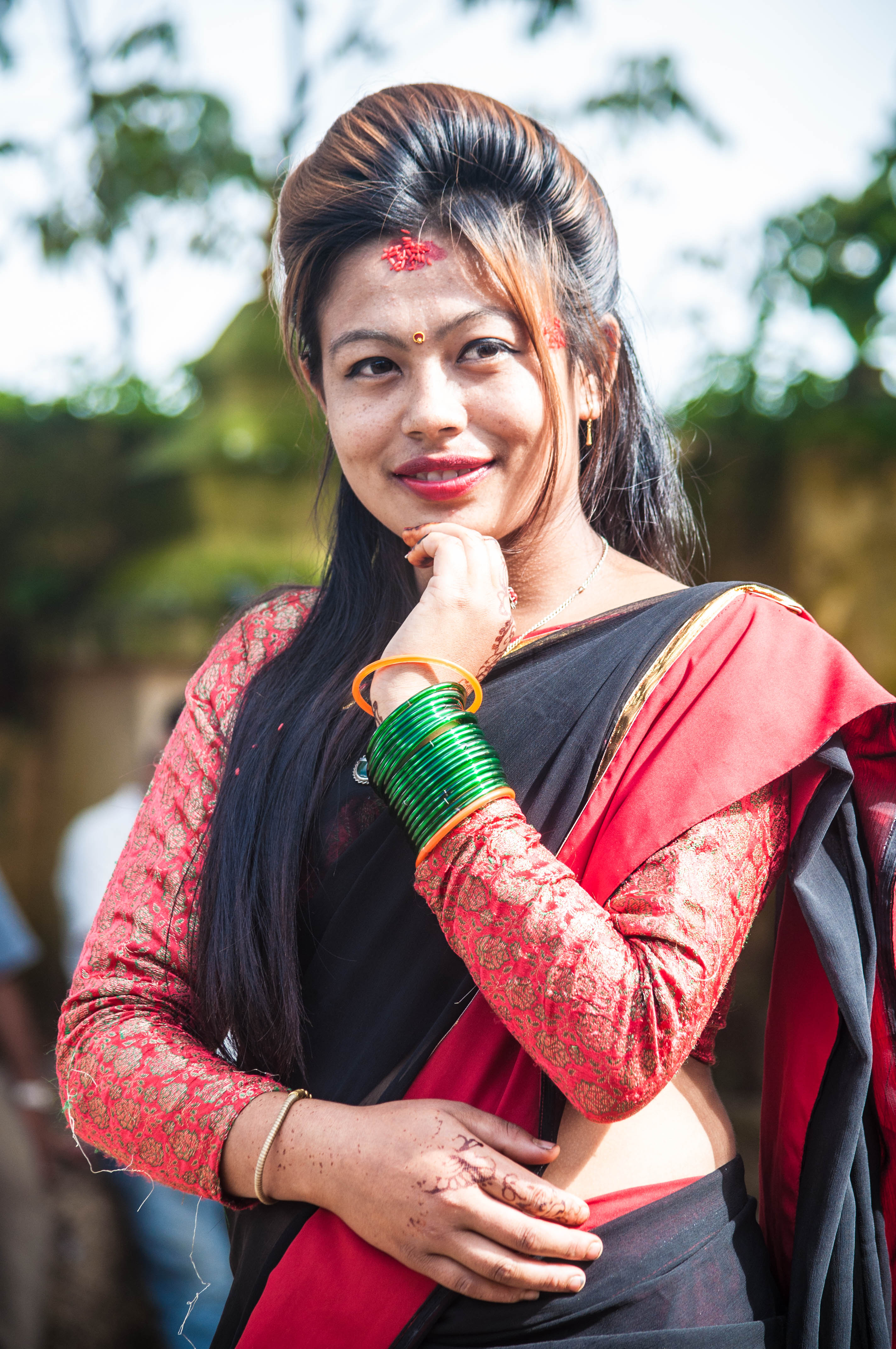
Newar lady in her traditional dress

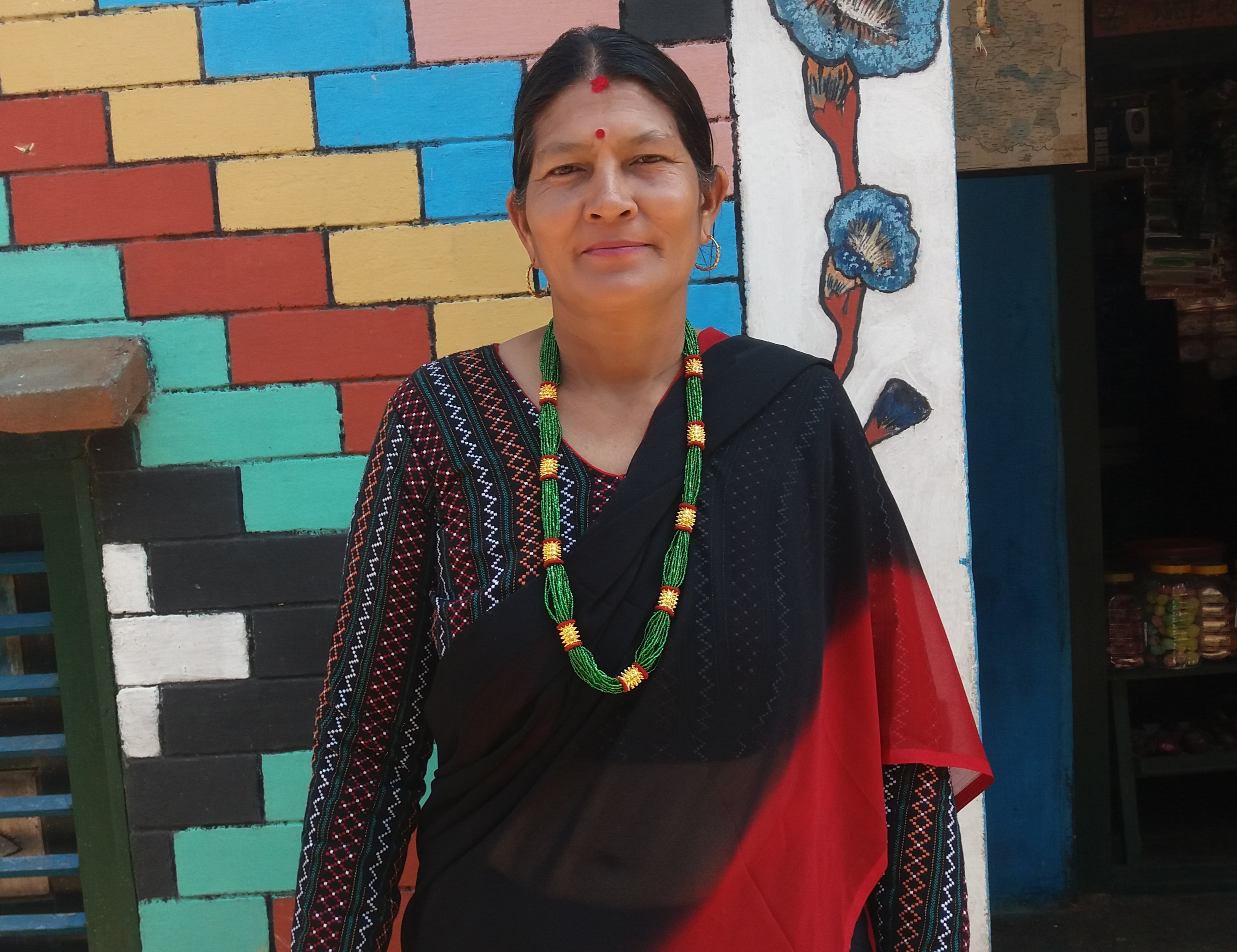
Newar woman of Saldanda Village, Syangja Nepal

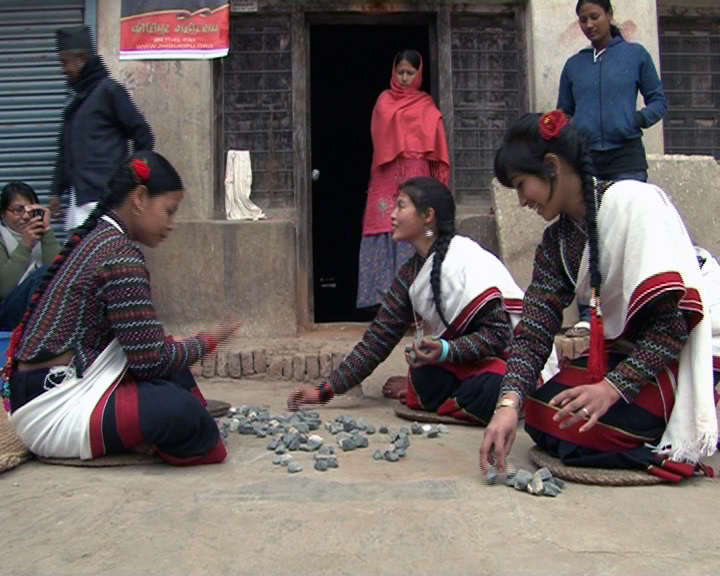
Newar girls playing stones

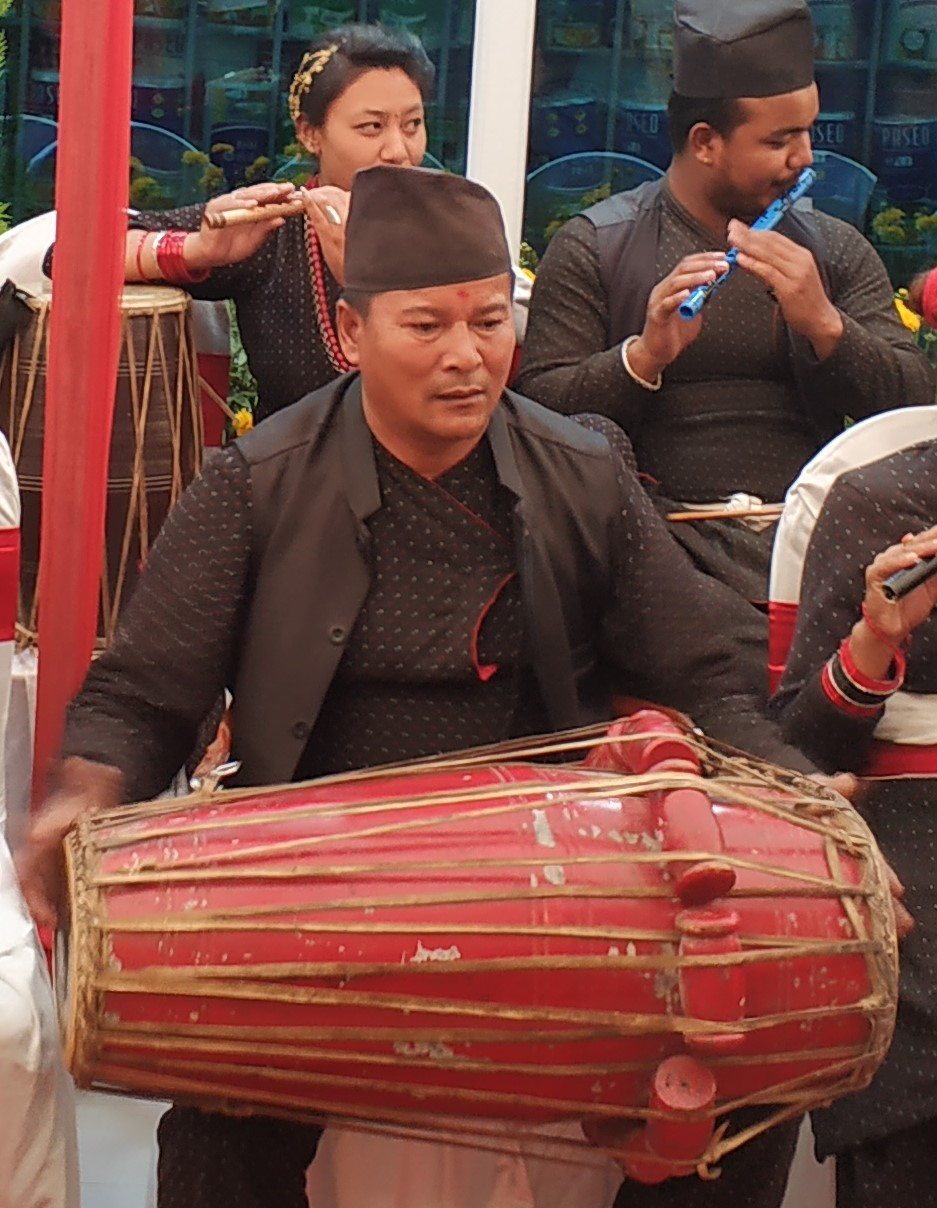
Newar man playing Pakhawaaja (Newar drum)

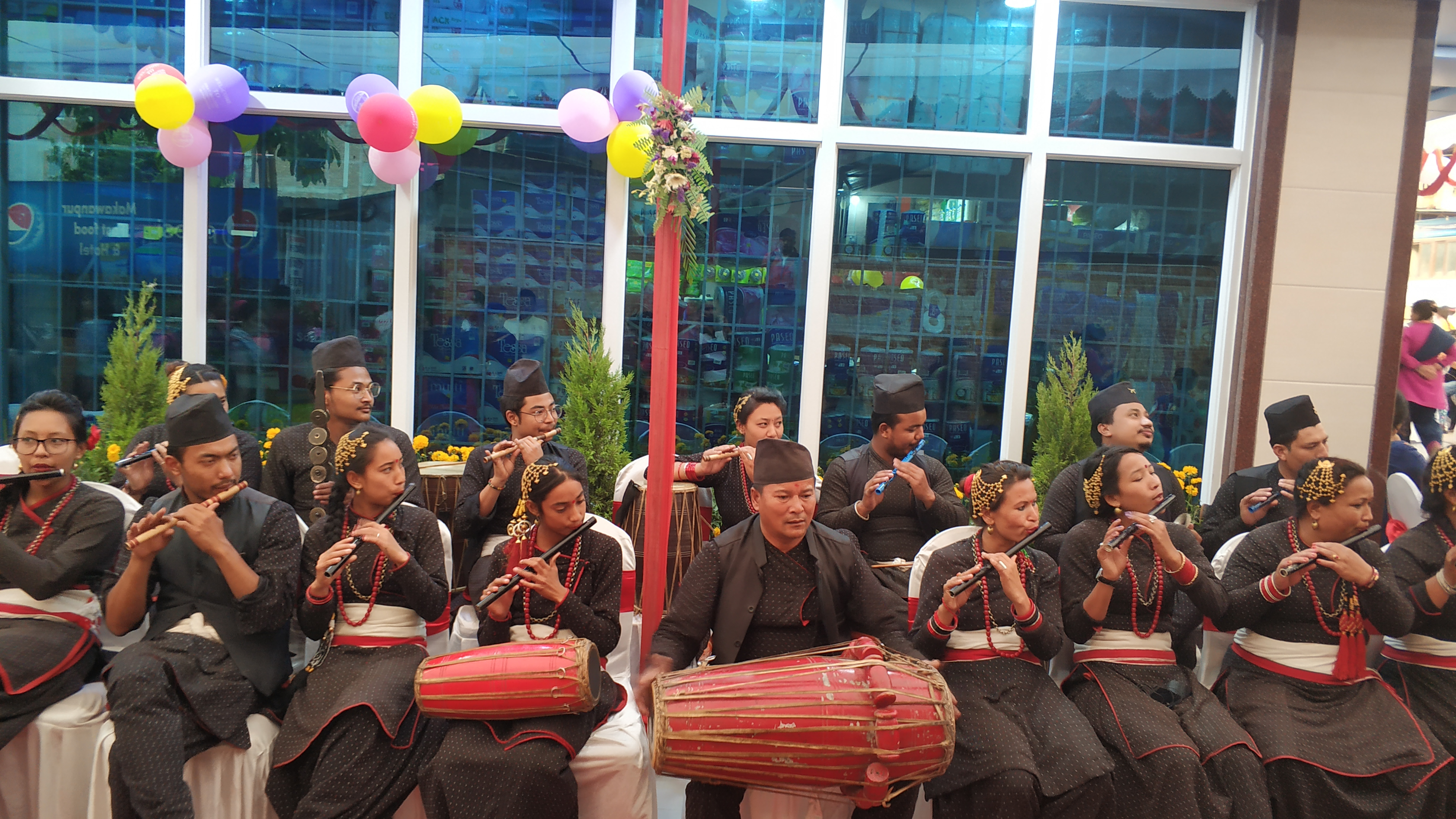
Music performed by the Newar community in Lalitpur district

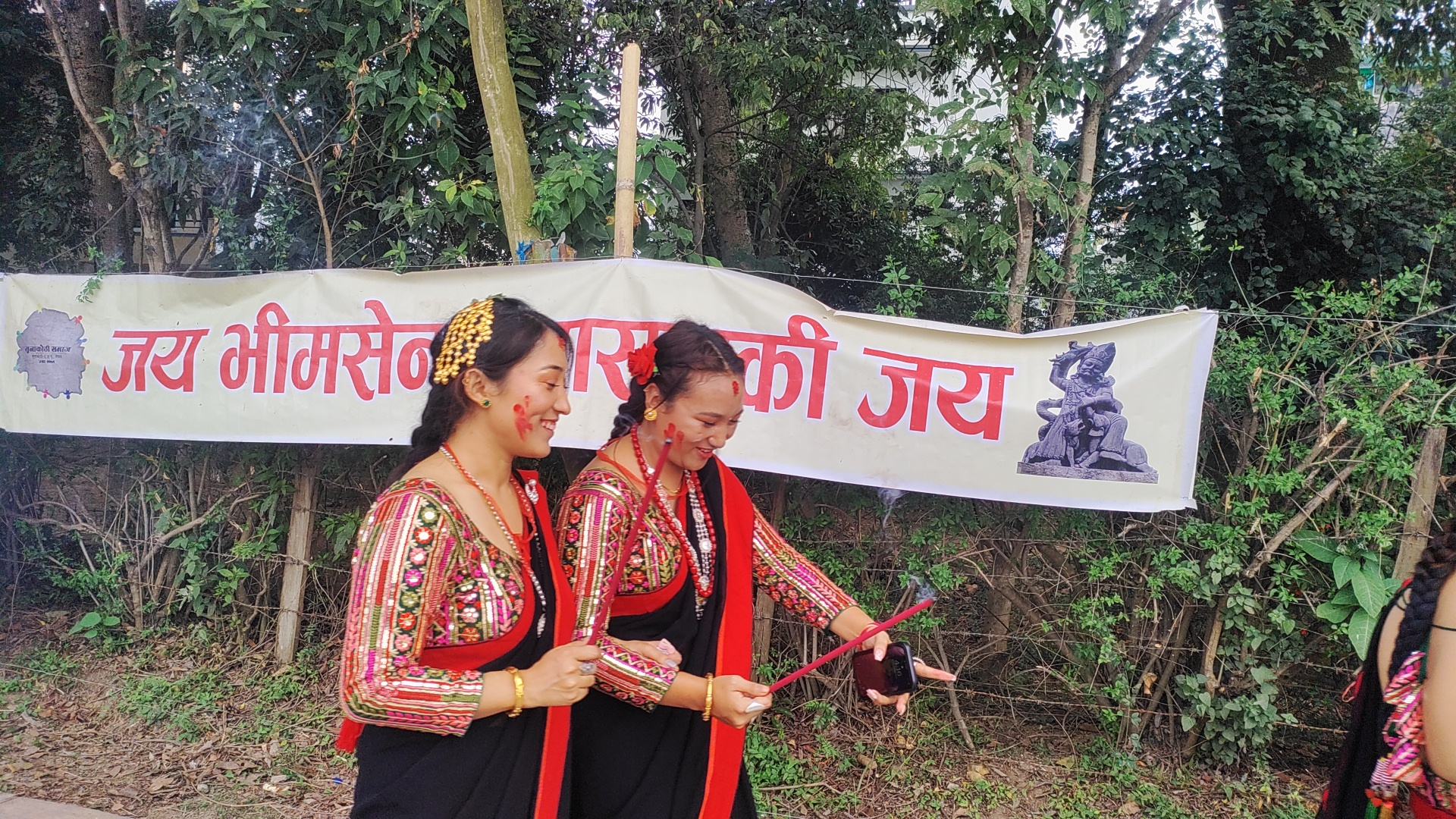
Newar ladies during Bhiumshen jatra at Sunakethi, Lalitpur.

== See also ==
- List of fabrics and textile of Nepal
