= Dhaka fabric =

Traditional fabric type

Dhaka may also refer to Dhaka muslin. It was made using a rare cotton and an elaborate 16-step process. Dhaka muslin was considered a great treasure and was used to clothe statues of goddesses in ancient Greece, as well as emperors and Mughal royalty

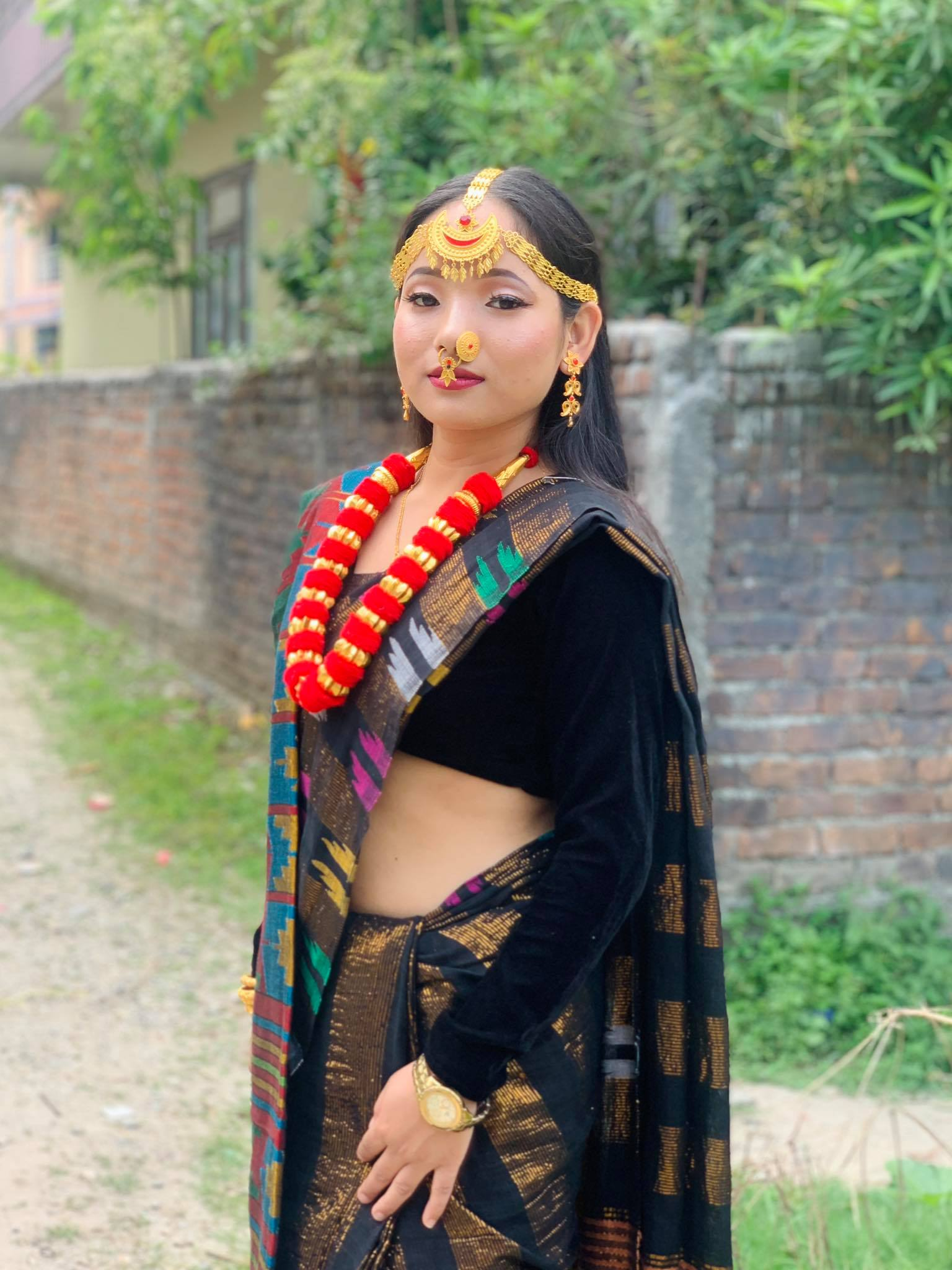
Limbu girl wearing dhaka dress.

Dhaka (originally called Thaka) is traditional hand made fabric of the indigenous Limbu people of eastern Nepal. It is a kind of pattern that is originally hand made which is gaining popularity in all cultures and around the world. It has its origins in Terhathum district of Nepal. The art of making dhaka is taught by one generation to another. Dhaka fabric represents Limbu cultural dress. Limbu man wear clad in dhaka topi (hat) and scarf, and a Limbu woman in dhaka mekhli, shawl and shari.
