= Ministry of Industry, Commerce and Supplies =

Government ministry of Nepal

- उद्योग, वाणिज्य तथा आपूर्ति मन्त्रालय
- Emblem of Nepal

Agency overview
- Jurisdiction: Government of Nepal
- Headquarters: Singha Durbar, Kathmandu, Nepal
- Minister responsible: Deepak Kumar Sah
- Agency executive: Krishna Bahadur Raut, Secretary
- Website: moics.gov.np

The Ministry of Industry, Commerce and Supplies (Nepali: उद्योग, वाणिज्य तथा आपूर्ति मन्त्रालय) is a governmental body of Nepal to monitor and manage industries of the country.

One of the major sub departments is the Department of Industry, which is responsible for the implementation of rules and regulations made by the ministry. In 2018, under the Second Oli cabinet, the portfolio of the ministry was enlarged and the portfolios of Commerce and Supplies was added to the then Ministry of Industry, while the Ministry of Commerce was discontinued. Key functions of the ministry include the creation of a conducive atmosphere for industrial development and investment promotion, tasks of regulation and facilitation of internal, bilateral, and regional trade, and the protection and building of industrial infrastructure and intellectual property rights. The ministry also engages in the formulation of policy and program in connection with industry, commerce, and supplies and collaborates with different ministries and entities of the Government of Nepal, the private sector, and international donor communities. The Ministry of Industry, Commerce and Supplies is headquartered in Singha Darbar, Kathmandu, Nepal.

== Current Organization ==
=== Divisions ===
There are seven divisions in the Ministry of Industry, Commerce and Supplies.

- Multilateral Trade and Trade Cooperation Division
- Industrial and Investment Promotion Division
- Bilateral and Regional Trade Division
- Industrial Infrastructure and Environment Division
- Administration and Enterprises Division
- Supply Management and Consumer Protection Division
- Planning, Monitoring, and Evaluation Division

=== Departments ===
The MoICS is also divided into six departments.

==== Department of Industry ====
The Department of Industry is one of the major agencies at the MoICS which is responsible for the implementation of policy, act, rules, and regulations related to industrial development. The department administers and facilitates middle and large scale industries that have fixed assets of more than 100 million Nepalese rupees. The current Director General is Mr. Jiblal Bhusal.

The major functions of the Department of Industry are as follows:

- Promote local and foreign investment for industrial development.
- Support in the formulation of acts and laws related to industrial as well as foreign investment.
- Approve industry registration and provide a license to the industries which require permission.
- Register medium and large scale industries that have fixed assets of more than 100 million Nepalese rupees.
- Provide permission for foreign investment, technological transfer, and foreign loan; register foreign investment based industries.
- Recommend visas for foreign investors.
- Recommend facilities and concessions accorded to industries.
- Perform administrative work related to industrial property.
- Approve Initial Environment Examination (IEE) report of the industry.
- Prepare raw material consumption norms for the industry.
- Monitor environmental compliance of the industry.
- Recommend Certificate of Origin for the products for preferential entry into India as per Nepal-India Trade Treaty.
- Act as the secretariat to the Industry and Investment Promotion Board and One Stop Service for the administration of various facilities as provided by International Energy Agency (IEA).

==== Commerce, Supply and Consumer Protection Department ====
There are three main objectives of the Commerce, Supply and Consumer Protection Department:

1. To regulate and facilitate internal trade business including foreign and inter-state trade of the commercial sector and reduce trade deficits.
2. To protect the rights of consumers by ensuring a clean, transparent, and competitive market while providing access to quality goods and services to customers.
3. To prepare a statistical basis for the supply system of domestic and foreign trade.

==== Company Registrar's Office ====
The current Registrar is Mr. Pradeep Raj Adhikari. The office has registered over 260,000 companies and issued over 253 trillion Nepali rupees.

==== Nepal Bureau of Standards and Metrology ====
The Nepal Institute of Standards was established in 1976, to develop national standards and to formulate concerning acts and rules. In 1981, the Nepal Institute of Standards was renamed and restructured into the Nepal Bureau of Standards as a full-fledged department of the Ministry of Industry. In 1988, the Department of Weights and Measures of the Ministry of Finance was merged with the Nepal Bureau of Standards and was restructured into the Nepal Bureau of Standards and Metrology and has been acting as such ever since. The Nepal Bureau of Standards and Metrology has offices in Biratnagar, Janakpur, Birgunj, Kathmandu, Pokhara, Butwal, Nepalgunj, Dhangadhi, Jhapa, Birendranagar, and Silgadhi. The current Director General is Mr. Bishwa Babu Pudasaini.

==== Department of Mines and Geology ====
The Department of Mines and Geology is the sole government organization responsible for all types of geological survey, mineral exploration, and administration of mining rules and regulations in Nepal. The current Deputy Director General is Dr. Rajendra Prasad Bhandari.

The major activities of the department cover five main fields of study:

1. Geo-Scientific Survey and Research
2. Engineering and Environmental Geological studies and Hazard assessments
3. Seismo-tectonic studies and Earthquake monitoring
4. Mineral exploration, evaluation and promotion of mineral based industries and administration of mineral and mining rules and regulations
5. Petroleum and Natural Gas Exploration

==== Micro, Cottage and Small Industry Promotion Center ====
The Micro, Cottage and Small Industry Promotion Center was established to carry out works related to the development and promotion of small enterprises and small scale industries. The center is located in the industrial complex of Tripureshwor, Kathmandu. The current General Secretary is Mr. Pushparaj Shahi.

=== Department Institute Committee Board ===
There are twenty-three members of the Department Institute Committee Board:

- Hetauda Cement Industries Limited
- Trade and Export Promotion Center (TEPC)
- Udayapur Cement Industries Limited
- Nepal Aushadhi Limited
- Dhauwadi Iron Company Limited
- National Center for Productivity and Economic Development
- Industrial District Management Limited
- Janakpur Cigarette Factory Limited
- Industrial Business Development Establishment
- Nepal Orient Magnesite Pvt. Ltd
- Nepal Metal Company Limited
- Biratnagar Jute Mills Limited
- Butwal Yarn Factory Limited
- Gorkhali Rubber Industries Limited
- Himal Cement Company Ltd.
- Nepal Transport and Warehouse Management Company Limited
- Food Management and Trade Company Limited
- Nepal Oil Corporation
- Salt Trading Corporation Limited
- Nepal Intermodal Transport Development Board
- Industrial Management Limited (IDML)
- Special Economic Authority Zone, Nepal

== Current Projects ==
=== Nepal-India Regional Trade and Transport Project (NIRTTP) ===
The NIRTTP is a World Bank-financed transport project to improve the efficiency of cross-border trade, including through improving sanitary and Phyto-sanitary (SPS) management, cross-border infrastructure and procedures, and trade-related capacities and has been effective since September 2013. NIRTTP aims to decrease transport time and logistics cost for bilateral trade between Nepal and India and transit trade along the Kathmandu-Kolkata corridor for the benefit of traders by reducing key infrastructure bottlenecks in Nepal and by adopting modern approaches to border management. The project has three main components: Component A: Modernize transport and transit arrangements between Nepal and India; Component B: Strengthen Trade-Related Institutional Capacity in Nepal; Component C: Improve Select Trade Related Infrastructure. Component C includes expanding and upgrading the 33 km Narayanghat-Mugling (N-M) road section, development of Inland Clearance Depot (ICD) in Kathmandu, and the improvement of the ICDs at Birgunj and Bhairahawa.

=== NEC Trade ===
Netreshwori Engineering Consultancy was established on April 19, 2016, with the aim of providing multidisciplinary consulting services and contributing to Nepal's national development. The NEC is registered as a private consultancy firm through the Ministry of Industry, Commerce and Supplies. The company provides areas of expertise in engineering, planning and design, architectural design of facilities, and supervision.

=== Rural Enterprises and Remittances Project (RERP) "SAMRIDDHI" ===
The RERP is a seven-year project jointly initiated by the MoICS and the International Fund for Agricultural Development (IFAD). The project aims at reducing poverty with employment-focused and inclusive economic development by providing sustainable sources of income to poor households, migrant families, and returnees through the creation of micro, small, and rural medium-sized enterprises as a means of developing local businesses and creating jobs and specifically includes returning migrants. RERP is being implemented from December 2015 to December 2022 with total funding of approximately US$23.23 million which includes grants from IFAD, contributions from the Government of Nepal, and expected contributions from the private sector and project beneficiaries. The Project covers 16 districts Morang, Sunsari, Saptari, Siraha, Bhojpur, Dhankuta, Khotang, Terhathum, Udayapur, Bara, Dhanusa, Mahotari, Rautahat, Sarlahi, Okhaldhunga and Sindhuli. The geographic area follows a road corridor approach linking districts along the main roads running south to north to facilitate the connection of hill districts to larger markets in Terai.

Some key performance indicators include:

- A 10% reduction in the prevalence of child malnutrition, as compared to the baseline.
- At least 33% of target entrepreneurs, vocational trainees, and apprentices are women.
- 30,000 rural youth have accessed job placement services.
- 30,000 RERP/SAMRIDDHI-supported enterprises (20,300 new and 9,700 existing) are still in business after 3 years, of which 33% are owned by women and 30% are owned by migrant returnees.
- 21,000 RERP/SAMRIDDHI-supported vocational trainees and apprentices, of which 33% of women, have had gainful employment over at least 6 months.

=== Micro Enterprise Development for Poverty Alleviation (MEDPA) ===
In 1998, the Government of Nepal (GoN) and the United Nations Development Program (UNDP) started implementing the Micro Enterprise Development Program (MEDEP) with the aim to cater to the needs of socially excluded groups living below the poverty line by promoting off-farm employment. Eventually the GoN internalized the program into Micro Enterprise Development for Poverty Alleviation (MEDPA) and implemented it under its own resources through the then Ministry of Industry in the fiscal year of 2009/2010. After the departure of the MEDEP in July 2018, the GoN has implemented MEDPA in all 753 local levels. The government has also allocated a budget of 2.24 billion Nepali Rupees to the MEDPA for the current fiscal year of 2020/2021. The target group of the MEDPA consists of at least 70% women, 30% Dalit, 40% Janajati/Indigenous, 40% Madhesi, 60% youth of ages 16–40 years old. A 2020 government employment plan prepared by the Ministry of Agriculture, Ministry of Labor, the Federal Affairs and General Administration, and representatives from the private sector was submitted to the MoICS. The report stated that 80,000 people can be provided employment through the MEDPA and a budget of 2.27 billion Nepali Rupees would be required.

== See also ==
- Nepal Bureau of Standards and Metrology
