= Department of Customs (Nepal) =

Department of Customs भन्सार विभाग Bhansāra vibhāga

Agency overview
- Formed: 1957

Jurisdictional structure
- Operations jurisdiction: Nepal
- Specialist jurisdiction: Customs, excise, gambling

Operational structure
- Headquarters: Tripureshwor, Kathmandu, Nepal
- Elected officer responsible: Swarnim Wagle, Finance Minister
- Agency executive: Shyam Prasad Bhandari, Director General
- Parent agency: Ministry of Finance, Government of Nepal

Website
- www.customs.gov.np

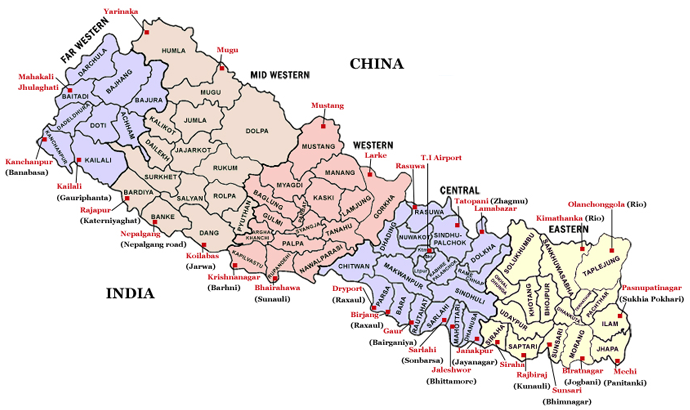
All customs check point and offices for revenue collection administered by government of Nepal, ministry of finance, kathmandu

The Department of Customs of Nepal is an administration of Government of Nepal under the Ministry of Finance which collects customs duty, Value Added Tax, excise and other taxes at the border points and international airport. The Department of Customs is responsible in contributing to the economic and social prosperity by providing professional and quality assured customs services in Nepal. Its mission is promoting and facilitating legitimate trade, protection of society and collecting the revenue. The current Director General of Department of Customs is Dhundi Prasad Niraula.

Prevalence of customs has existed in Nepal since the Lichchhavi era. Before 1950, Tibet and India were Nepal's major trading partners. There were inner customs offices before 1950. However, the modern era of customs begun with the trade treaty with India in 1950; as a result, all inner customs were closed and borders offices started to work as customs offices.

The Nepalese Government has made a new rule starting from Jestha 15, 2080 B.S. It's about what people can bring with them when they travel abroad and what they can bring back to Nepal when they return from foreign countries. This rule is based on a law called the Customs Act, 2064 (2008), and it's found in Section 9, Sub-section (3).

== Customs offices ==
=== At airport ===
Customs Office	Province (Location)	Associated International Airport
Tribhuvan International Airport Customs Office	Bagmati (Kathmandu)	Tribhuvan International Airport (TIA)
Pokhara International Airport Customs Office	Gandaki (Pokhara)	Pokhara International Airport (PIA)
Gautam Buddha International Airport Customs Office	Lumbini (Siddharthanagar)	Gautam Buddha International Airport (GBIA)

=== Central/Port ===
Customs Office	Province	District	Location
Post Clearance Audit Office	Bagmati	Kathmandu	Tripureshwor
Chobhar Dry Port Customs Office	Bagmati	Kathmandu	Chobhar, Kirtipur

=== At border with India ===
Below is a list of Nepalese customs offices located along the border with India:

Customs Office	Province	District (Location)	Border Area / Nearby Town
Pashupatinagar Customs Office	Koshi	Ilam (Suryodaya)	Pashupatinagar – Mirik
Mechi Customs Office	Koshi	Jhapa (Mechinagar)	Kakarbhitta – Naxalbari
Bhadrapur Customs Office	Koshi	Jhapa (Bhadrapur)	Bhadrapur – Galgalia
Biratnagar Customs Office	Koshi	Morang (Biratnagar)	Biratnagar – Jogbani
Sunsari Customs Office	Koshi	Sunsari (Koshi)	Bhantabari – Bhimnagar
Rajbiraj Customs Office	Madhesh	Saptari (Tilathi Koiladi)	Rajbiraj – Kunaolee
Thadi Customs Office	Madhesh	Siraha (Sakhuwanankarkatti)	Lahan – Laukaha
Siraha Customs Office	Madhesh	Siraha (Siraha)	Madar – Madhubani
Janakpur Customs Office	Madhesh	Dhanusha (Janakpur)	Janakpur – Jainagar
Jaleshwar Customs Office	Madhesh	Mahottari (Jaleshwar)	Jaleshwar – Bhitthamore
Sarlahi Customs Office	Madhesh	Sarlahi (Malangwa)	Malangwa – Sonbarsa
Gaur Customs Office	Madhesh	Rautahat (Gaur)	Gaur – Bairgania
Birgunj Customs Office	Madhesh	Parsa (Birgunj)	Birgunj – Raxaul
Tribeni Customs Office	Gandaki	Nawalpur (Binayi Tribeni)	Raninagar – Pipra
Maheshpur Customs Office	Lumbini	Parasi (Palhinandan)	Maheshpur – Thuthibari
Bhairahawa Customs Office	Lumbini	Rupandehi (Siddharthanagar)	Siddharthanagar – Sonauli
Krishnanagar Customs Office	Lumbini	Kapilbastu (Krishnanagar)	Krishnanagar – Barhni
Suthauli Customs Office	Lumbini	Kapilbastu (Yashodhara)	Suthauli – Khunwa
Koilabas Customs Office	Lumbini	Dang (Gadhawa)	Koilabas – Rampur
Nepalgunj Customs Office	Lumbini	Banke (Nepalgunj)	Nepalgunj – Rupaidiha
Rajapur Customs Office	Sudurpashchim	Bardiya (Rajapur)	Rajapur – Katarniaghat
Satti Customs Office	Sudurpashchim	Kailali	
Kailali Customs Office	Sudurpashchim	Kailali (Dhangadi)	Dhangadhi – Gauriphanta
Kanchanpur Customs Office	Sudurpashchim	Kanchanpur (Bhimdatta)	Gaddachauki – Banbasa
Mahakali Customs Office	Sudurpashchim	Baitadi (Dasharathchand)	Dasharathchand– Pithoragarh
Darchula Customs Office	Sudurpashchim	Darchula (Mahakali)	Mahakali – Dharchula

This table lists Nepalese customs offices located along the India–Nepal border and their associated crossing areas. Some offices may serve air cargo or small local trade zones.

=== At border with China ===
Customs Office	Province	District (Location)	Border Area / Region
Olangchungola Customs Office	Koshi	Taplejung (Phaktanglung)	Olangchungola – Tipta La – Ri'og
Kimathanka Customs Office	Koshi	Sankhuwasabha (Bhotkhola)	Kimathanka – Zhêntang
Lamabagar Customs Office	Bagmati	Dolakha (Bigu)	Lamabagar –
Tatopani Customs Office	Bagmati	Sindhupalchok (Bhotekoshi)	Kodari – Friendship Bridge – Zhangmu
Rasuwa Customs Office	Bagmati	Rasuwa (Gosaikunda)	Rasuwagadhi – Gyirong Port – Kyirong
Larke Customs Office	Gandaki	Gorkha	Larkya La –
Mustang Customs Office	Gandaki	Mustang (Lo Manthang)	Lomanthang – Korala – Zhongba
Mugu Customs Office	Karnali	Mugu	
Yari (Naka) Customs Office	Karnali	Humla (Namkha)	Hilsa – Burang

== See also ==
- List of Nepal government organizations
