= ICP Raxaul =

ICP Customs Office Raxaul
- आईसीपी सीमा शुल्क कार्यालय, रक्सौल
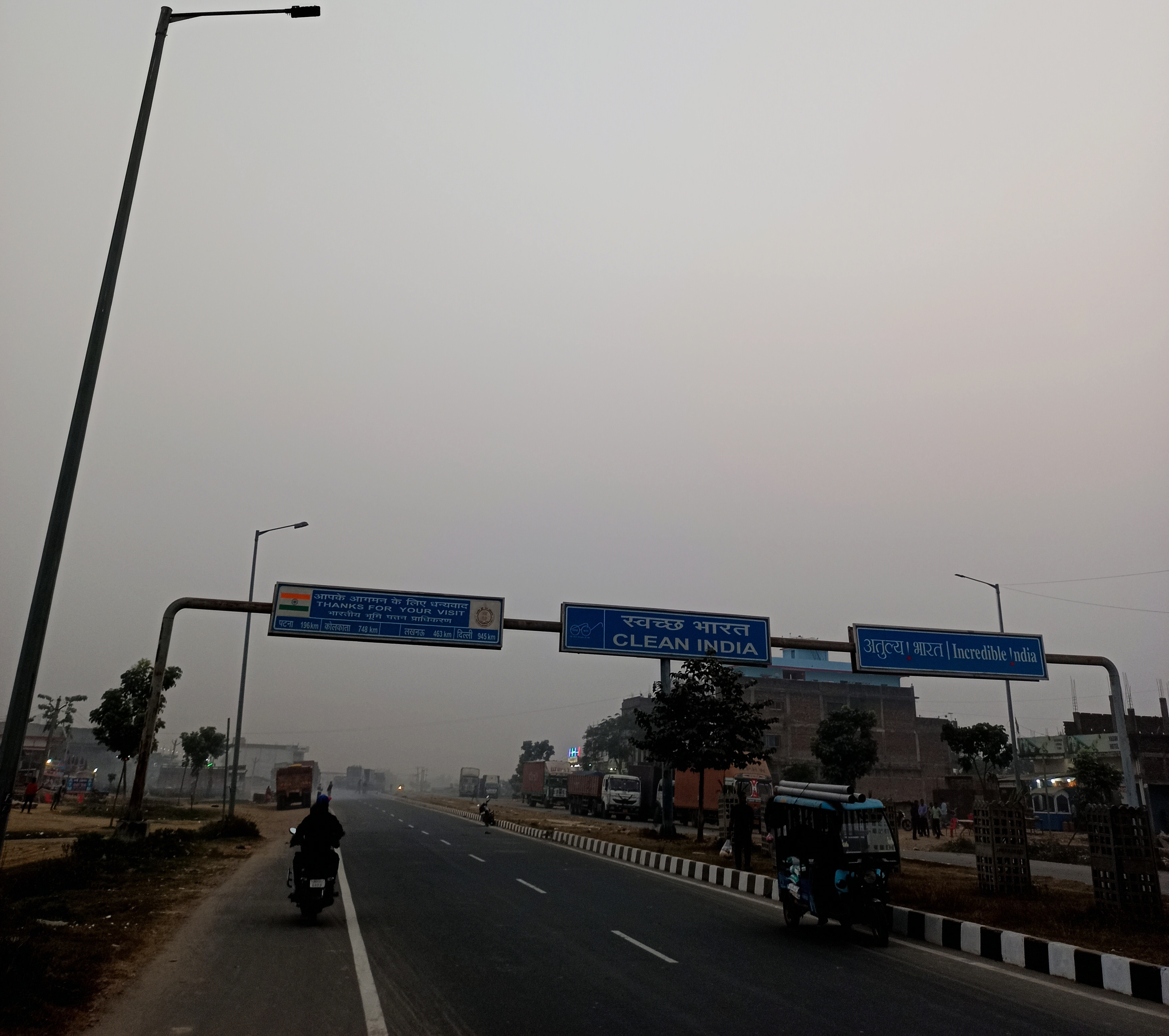
- Customs Office at Raxaul, Bihar

Agency overview
- Formed: 3 June 2016
- Jurisdiction: India-Nepal border
- Headquarters: Raxaul, East Champaran, Bihar, India; 26.99078°N 84.85805°E
- Parent department: Ministry of Finance
- Parent agency: Central Board of Indirect Taxes and Customs
- Website: lpai.gov.in

Integrated Check Post Raxaul (ICP Raxaul) is a land port on the India–Nepal border, located in the town of Raxaul, East Champaran district, Bihar, India. It facilitates cargo and passenger movement with Birgunj, Nepal, and is managed by the Land Ports Authority of India.

== History ==
The foundation stone for ICP Raxaul was laid in 2010, and the facility became operational on 3 June 2016. It was jointly inaugurated with its counterpart in Birgunj, Nepal, in April 2018 by the Prime Ministers of both countries. The project was developed by the Land Ports Authority of India (LPAI) to streamline cross-border movement and trade.

== Location ==
ICP Raxaul is located approximately 230 km from Patna, the capital of Bihar, and about 5 km from Raxaul Railway Station. It lies adjacent to the town of Birgunj in Nepal, often referred to as the "Gateway of Nepal".

== Trade and economic significance ==
The Integrated Check Post (ICP) at Raxaul, located on the India–Nepal border in Bihar, is a key hub for bilateral trade between the two nations. According to official figures, in the fiscal year 2022–2023, India exported goods worth approximately ₹33,882 crore (INR) through the Raxaul Land Port, which accounted for nearly 45% of the total trade between India and Nepal.

The ICP is managed by the Land Ports Authority of India (LPAI), which has been responsible for developing and operating several land ports across India since its establishment in 2012.

== Infrastructure ==
Spread over an area of 235.33 acres, ICP Raxaul is equipped with modern facilities to handle both cargo and passenger movement. Key infrastructure includes:

- Dedicated cargo terminals with warehousing and inspection facilities
- Customs and immigration offices
- Quarantine and health inspection units
- Electronic weighbridges and scanning equipment
- Separate lanes for inbound and outbound traffic

== Trade significance ==
ICP Raxaul is one of the busiest land ports on the India–Nepal border. In the fiscal year 2016–17, India's exports to Nepal increased by 75% following the operationalization of the ICP. The port handles approximately 45% of the total bilateral trade between the two countries. Major exports from India through this route include petroleum products, iron and steel, pharmaceuticals, motor vehicles, and dairy machinery. Imports from Nepal consist of vegetable oils, processed foods, textiles, cosmetics, and leather goods.

== Passenger movement ==
Despite the open border policy between India and Nepal, formal passenger movement through ICP Raxaul remains minimal. In 2016–17, only 2,321 passengers were recorded crossing through the ICP, averaging less than 10 individuals per day. This low number is attributed to the unrestricted movement allowed to citizens of both countries, with formal crossings primarily used by third-country nationals.

== Connectivity ==
ICP Raxaul is connected to the Sirsiya Inland Container Depot (ICD) in Birgunj, Nepal, via a broad-gauge railway line. This linkage facilitates direct movement of containers from Indian ports, notably Kolkata, to Nepal, enhancing trade efficiency. Additionally, the Motihari-Amlekhganj pipeline, inaugurated in September 2019, passes through Raxaul, ensuring a steady supply of petroleum products to Nepal.

== See also ==
- ICP Birgunj Customs Office
- India–Nepal border
- Land Ports Authority of India
- Dryport Birgunj
- Motihari-Amlekhganj pipeline
