= Chobhar Customs Office =

- चोभार भन्सार कार्यालय

Customs office overview
- Formed: 2022
- Jurisdiction: Government of Nepal
- Headquarters: Chobhar, Kirtipur, Kathmandu District, Nepal
- Parent department: Department of Customs, Ministry of Finance
- Website: chobhar.customs.gov.np

The Chobhar Customs Office (Nepali: चोभार भन्सार कार्यालय) is a customs office of the Government of Nepal located at the Chobhar Dry Port in Chobhar, Kirtipur, on the outskirts of Kathmandu. It operates under the Department of Customs and handles customs clearance for cargo processed at the Chobhar Dry Port, which is managed by the Nepal Intermodal Transport Development Board (NITDB).

== History ==
The Chobhar Dry Port, Nepal's first inland dry port, was built with about World Bank financial assistance of US$22 million under an agreement signed in 2013. Land ownership transfer delays pushed back construction, and the foundation stone was laid by then-Prime Minister KP Sharma Oli on 17 January 2019. Construction, awarded to a joint venture of local and international contractors, was completed in October 2021 after delays caused by the COVID-19 pandemic and local protests. The dry port and its customs office were formally inaugurated on 5 April 2022 by Prime Minister Sher Bahadur Deuba.

== See also ==
- Department of Customs (Nepal)
- Nepal Intermodal Transport Development Board
- Chobhar
