= Himal Cement Industry =

State owned cement factory

- Native name: हिमाल सिमेन्ट कारखाना
- Type: Public
- Industry: Cement
- Founded: 1967; 59 years ago
- Defunct: 2002
- Fate: Chobhar Dry Port
- Headquarters: Chobhar, Kirtipur, Nepal

Himal Cement Industry (Nepali: हिमाल सिमेन्ट कारखाना) was a state owned cement factory of Nepal. It was established in 1967 and was the first and biggest cement industry of Nepal till it shut down in 2002. The capacity of the plant was 160 TPD in 1975. After renovation, the capacity was increased to 200 TPD. The industry is remembered for its historical significance as it substantially increased the cement demand in Nepal for development works. Prior to its construction, cement was imported from India, Singapore and European countries.

== History ==
Himal Cement Industry was located in Chobhar, Kirtipur in the suburbs of Kathmandu (it is now occupied by the Chobhar Dry Port). The project was originally constructed with a financial aid from Germany. The production line was delivered in 1967 and the operation started in 1975. The initial design capacity was 48,000 tonnes of cement annually accounting for about 18% of Nepal's cement demand. But the production was far below. The plant was rehabilitated in 1986 by a Chinese supplier with installation of electrical filters for dust removal and additional mills. The factory had clinker production, grinding and packaging facilities.

Due to technical problems the plant was shut down briefly in 1990. The plant was finally shut down in 2002 after a large opposition by the locals concerning dusts and air pollution.

== Current status ==
The land of the factory is now used to develop a dry port by Nepal Intermodal Transport Development Board with the loan assistance from the World Bank. The dry port will contain warehouses, parking lot, litigation shed, administrative buildings, quarantine, bank and other required facilities for customs clearance. The dry port will have a capacity of about 600 containers and parking facility for about 350 trucks. However, the locals demand that land be utilized only after consulting them.

== See also ==
- Udayapur Cement Industry, another state owned cement industry of Nepal
- Herbs Production & Processing Co. Ltd., state owned herb industry of Nepal
