= Ropeways in Nepal =

Ropeways in Nepal, which mainly refer to the aerial ropeways, are used for human and cargo transport. In the 'Nepal Country Report' of 1976 by the World Bank concluded that construction and maintenance of roads in mountainous are costly due to hilly terrain, and thus other means of transport should be studied mainly indicating to the ropeways. However, ropeways have not gained significant popularity over roadways. In the Ninth Five-year Plan ropeway was encouraged with and involvement of the private sector. But no provision in the national budget was made for ropeway development. Nonetheless, private sector has initiated the construction and operation of ropeways mainly in lucrative places such as religious temple.

== History ==
The first ropeway to carry cargo was Halchowk-Lainchour ropeway which was used to transport stones from the quarry to build palaces. The famous, Dhorsing-chisapnai-Chandragiri ropeway passing into Kathmandu was built by Chandra Shamser Rana in 1922. It was upgraded in 1964 to reach to Hetauda with a total length of 42 km with technical and financial assistance from USAID.

== Types of ropeways in Nepal ==
Following are the types of ropeways based on the operation mechanism and types of transport.

=== Tar pul or Ghirling ===
Also known as twin, these are rudimentary ropeways used in lieu of bridges to cross rivers. These are generally installed by the local community based on necessity. As of May 2004, there are 25 Tar Pul in Kavre, Gorkha, Myagdi, Udaypur, Chitwan and Lamjung

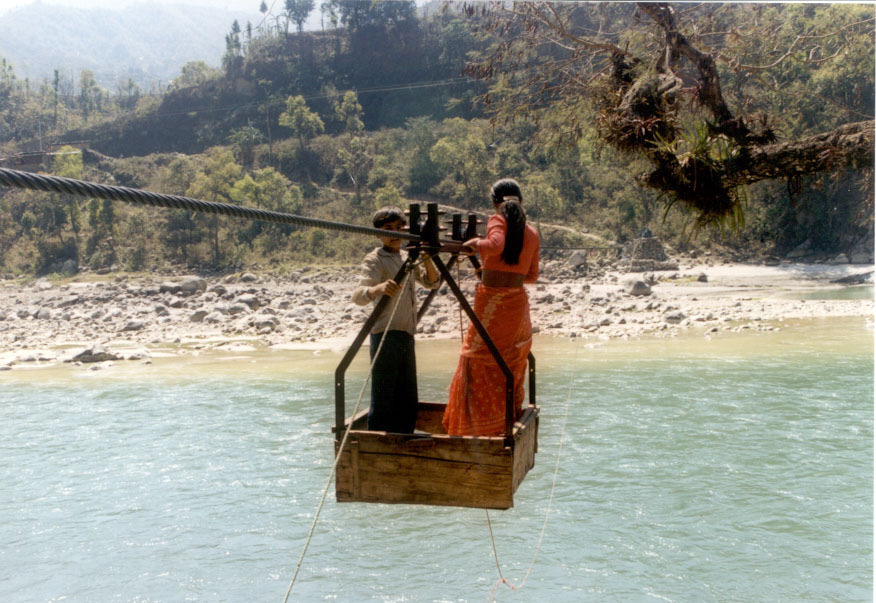
Tar pul or Ghirling or Tuin

=== Gravity Ropeways ===
A gravity ropeway operates by using potential energy with mechanical power. A weight lowered from a higher elevation lifts the cargo. Ropeways of this type were first used in Mustang to transport apples. Since then they have been installed in four other locations: Gorkha, Tanahun, Kalikot and Achham. Most of the construction ropeways fall in this category.

=== Cargo Ropeways ===
Cargo ropeways are used in Nepal to transport goods from one place to another. The first ropeway, Halchowk-Lainchour, was in fact a cargo ropeway. The most famous cargo ropeway was the Kathmandu-Hetauda Ropeway, which is now out of operation.

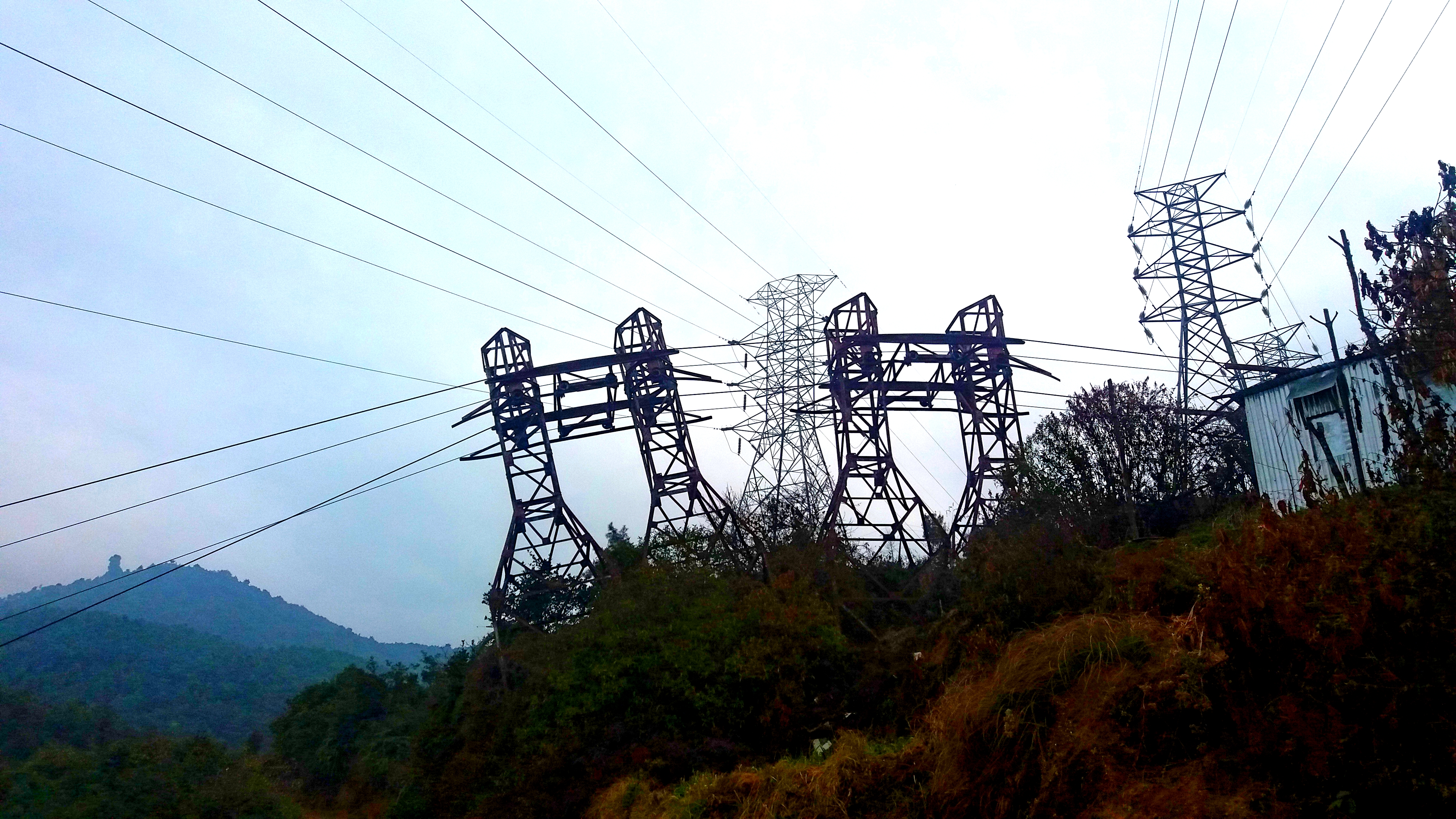
Kathmandu-Hetauda Cargo Ropeway

=== Passenger ropeways ===
Mostly electrically operated, these kinds of ropeways or Cable Cars are used by passengers. The first of this kind was Manakamana Cable Car, established in 1998.

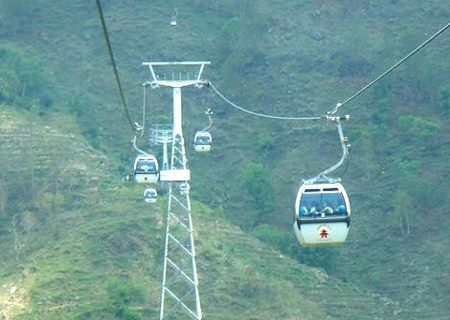
Manakamana Passenger Ropeway

Annapurna Cable Car

== List of ropeways in Nepal ==
This list does not include the smaller ghirlings, which are more numerous.

Name	Location (From - To)	Type (Cargo or Passenger)	Length (m)	Capacity	Description	Operation date (Start-End)	Current Status	Construction cost	Photo
Adhi khola ropeway	Syangja	Cargo	1200	300 kg	Used to transport construction material for Adhikhola Hydropower Project	1985	Non-functional	NPR 2.3 Million	No photo
Jimhruk khola ropeway	Syangja, Madi-to construction sites	Cargo	1200	800 kg	Used to transport construction material for Jhimruk Khola Hydropower Project	1990	Non-functional	NPR 3.5 Million	No photo
Khimti Ropeway	Kirene- construction sites	Cargo	2100		Used to transport construction material for Khimti I Hydropower Project		Non-functional	NPR 35 Million	No photo
Hetauda Cement Factory Ropeway	Hetauda Quarry site-factory	Cargo	11,000	150 tonne/hr	Used to transport stones		Non-functional		No photo
Bhattedanda Milkway	Lalitpur, Bhattedada-Jhakridada	Cargo	3022	450 kg	Used to transport milk and khuwa (खुवा)	1995–2001, 2002-	Unknown		No photo
Bharpak Ropeway	Gorkha	Cargo			Used to transport general merchandise. Stopped working after the accident.	1998-1999	Non-functional		
Manakamana Cable Car	Chitwan	Passenger	2772	600 person/hour	Transport to the Manakamana Temple from Prithvi Highway	1998	In operation		Manakamana Cable Car
Chandragiri Cable Car	Kathmandu, Thankot to Chandragiri	Passenger	2400	1000 person/hour	Transport to Bhaleshwor Mahadev temple	2016	In operation		Chadragiri
Tri Chandra Nepal Tara Ropeway (Kathmandu-Hetauda Ropeway)	Kathmandu-Hetauda	Cargo	42,300	22 tonne/day	Used to transport cargo	1964-1994	Non-functional		No photo
Dorsing-Chisapani-Kathmandu	Kathmandu	Cargo	22,000		It was upgraded to Kathmandu-Hetauda Ropeway in 1964. Engineer was Dilli Jung Thapa.	1922	Non-functional		No photo
Halchowk-Lainchour	Kathmandu	Cargo	4,000		Used to transport stones.	1924	Non-functional		No photo
Janagaun Gravity Ropeway		Cargo			Used to transport food and medicines. Installed by Practical Action Nepal	2005	In Operation		No photo
Bishaltar Gravity Ropeway	Kathmandu	Cargo			Used to transport food and medicines. Installed by Practical Action Nepal.	2007	In Operation		No photo
Kalinchowk Cable Car	Dolkha, (Kuri to Kalinchok Bhagawati Temple	Passenger	1,000		Passenger to the temple.	2018	In operation		
Annapurna Cable Car	Pokhara, Phewatal to Sarankot	Passenger	2,500		Passenger to the temple.	2020	in Operation	NPR 1 Arab and 10 Crores.	Annapurna Cable Car
Kharidunga mine ropeway	Dolakha, Sindhupalchowk (Kharidhunga to Lamosanghu)	Cargo	10,300		Transport talc and magnesium mine at Kharidhunga.	2020	Non-functional		Kharidunga mine ropeway
Udayapur cement mine ropeway	Udayapur, (Sindhali-hill to factory)	Cargo	13,800		Transport limestone.	1987	In Operation		No photo
Lumbini Cable Car	Goalpark Bamghat-Basantpur, Tinahu	Passenger	3,000		Passenger to the temple	2023	in Operation		No photo
Maula Kali cable car	Gaidakot-Maulakali	Passenger	1,200		Passenger to the temple	2023	in Operation		No photo
Bandipur Cable Car	Dumre Bazzar- Bandipur	Passenger	1,700		Passenger to the temple	2024	in Operation		No photo
Siddhartha Cable Car	Butwal to Nuwakot (Palpa)	Passenger	1,950		Passenger to Nuwakot, Palpa	2024	In Operation		No Photo

== Projects under consideration ==
Name	Location (From - To)	Length (m)	Type (Cargo or Passenger)	Description	Current Status	Construction cost
Muktinath Cable Car	Birethanti to Muktinath	86,650	Passenger	World's Longest Cable Car	Under Construction	NPR 35 billion
Pathibhara Cable Car	Pathibhara (Taplejung)	2,750	Passenger		Under Construction	
Jalpa Devi Cable Car	Lamki Chuha (Kailali)	3,100	Passenger		Under Construction	
Sikles Cable Car	Madi Rural Municipality (Kaski)	6,416	Passenger		Under Construction	
Chimkeswori Cable Car	Chhimkeswor Temple (Tanahu)		Passenger		Under Construction	
Champadevi Cable Car	Chalnakhel (Kathmandu)		Passenger		Under Construction	

== Accidents and safety ==
- In cargo type ropeways, accidents such as falling off of the bucket (as in Adhi Khola and Jimruk Khola ropeways) usually are not fatal.
- Four people riding in the ropeway car at Bhapak Ropeway died when the hauling cable snapped on 7 May 1999.
- The Chandragiri cable car stopped in mid-air once for 40 minutes and twice for 10 minutes on separate occasions in 2020, inducing panic among the passengers.

== See also ==
- Manakamana Cable Car
- Chandragiri Cable Car
- Transportation in Nepal
