= ICP Birgunj Customs Office =

- वीरगञ्ज एकीकृत जाँच चौकी भन्सार कार्यालय
- ICP Birgunj Customs Main Building (2018)

- Location within Nepal

Agency overview
- Formed: 2018
- Jurisdiction: Government of Nepal
- Headquarters: Birgunj, Parsa District, Madhesh Province, Nepal; 26°59′36″N 84°51′37″E
- Agency executive: Deepak Lamichhane, Chief Customs Administrator
- Parent department: Ministry of Finance, Government of Nepal
- Website: birgunj.customs.gov.np

ICP Birgunj Customs Office (Nepali: वीरगञ्ज एकीकृत जाँच चौकी भन्सार कार्यालय) is one of the most significant customs facilities in Nepal, situated in Birgunj near the border town of Raxaul, India. It operates under the Department of Customs (Nepal), Ministry of Finance (Nepal) and facilitates high-volume trade and customs clearance through the Integrated Check Post (ICP) system.

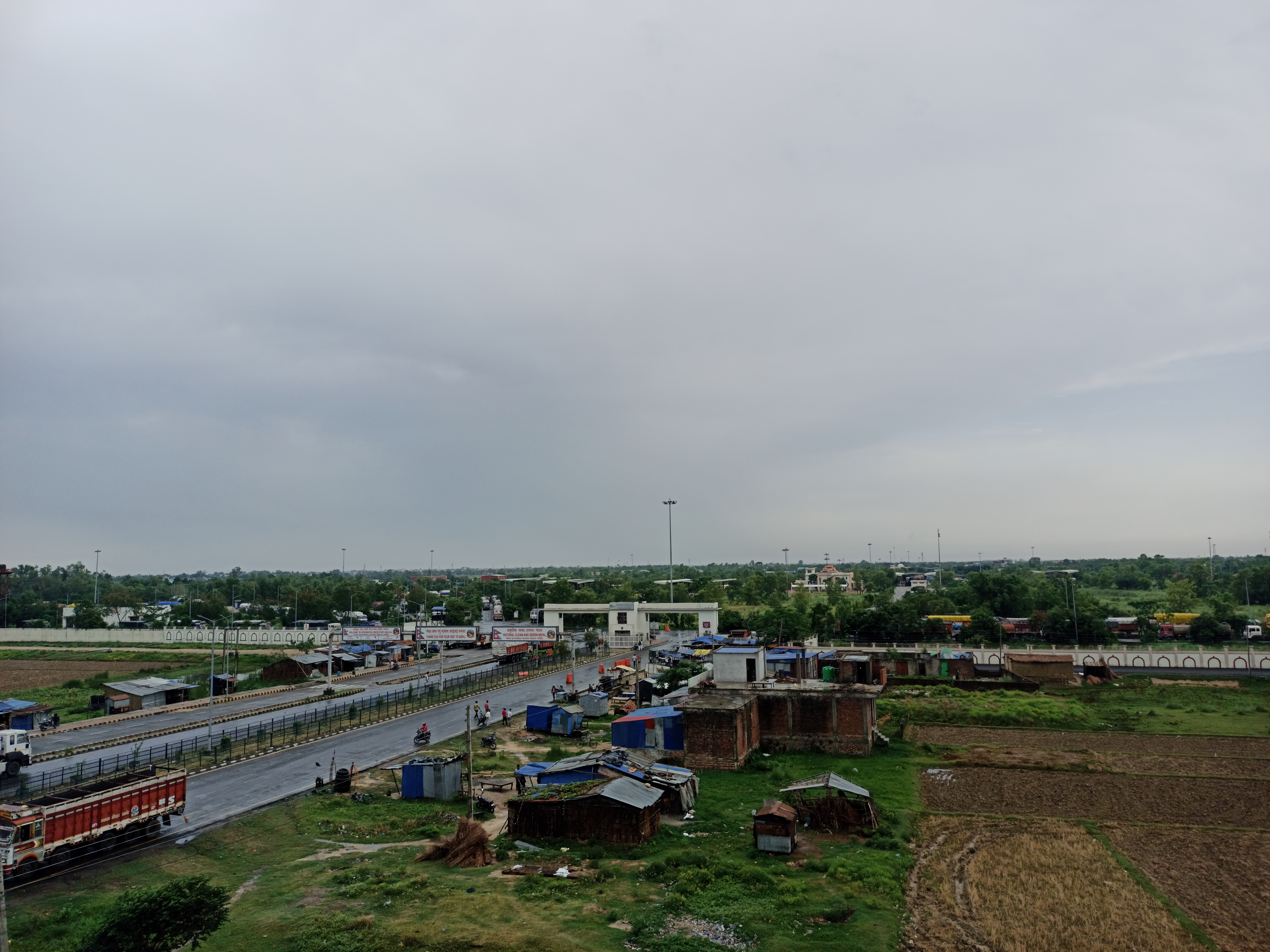
Birgunj Customs Office, ICP Birgunj

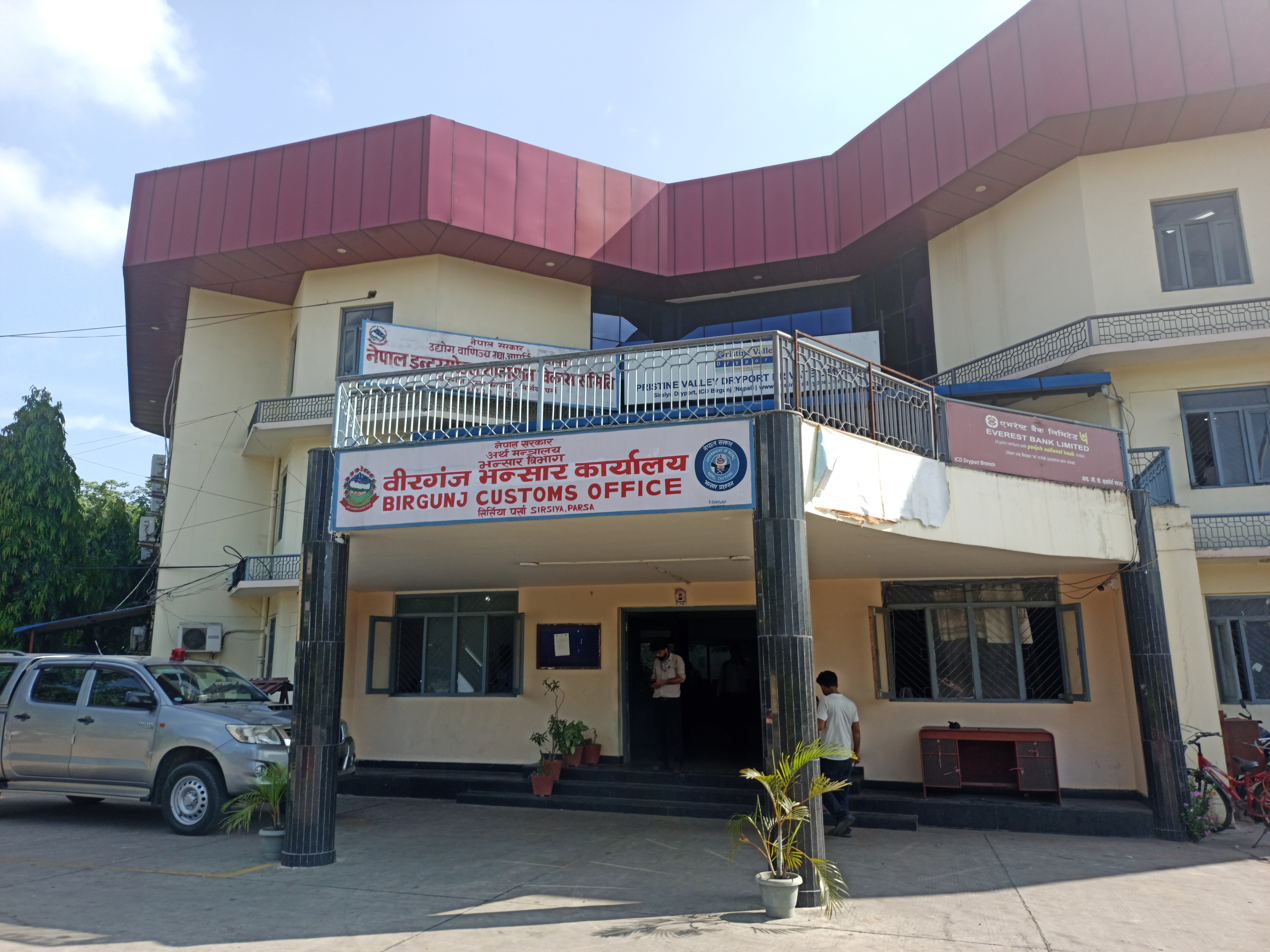
Birgunj Customs Office, ICD

Birgunj Integrated Check Post (ICP) is a key land port and customs facility situated on the Nepal–India border in Birgunj, Parsa District, Nepal. It lies opposite Raxaul in the Indian state of Bihar and serves as one of the most important gateways for bilateral trade between Nepal and India.

== History and development ==
The ICP was constructed with financial and technical assistance from the Government of India under the bilateral agreement to facilitate modern cross-border trade infrastructure. It was inaugurated jointly by Prime Ministers KP Sharma Oli of Nepal and Narendra Modi of India on 7 April 2018 via video conference. The project was constructed at a cost of around INR 860 million.

== Economic significance ==
The Birgunj ICP handles around 58% of Nepal's total trade with India. In fiscal year 2017–18, it collected over NPR 131 billion in revenue, making it the largest revenue-collecting land port in the country. As of the first six months of Fiscal Year 2024/25, the Birgunj Customs Office handled imports worth NPR 275.70 billion, making it one of the largest import points in Nepal. In the first seven months of the same fiscal year, it collected NPR 94.52 billion in revenue. According to New Business Age, Birgunj Customs has consistently been the highest revenue-generating customs office in Nepal for several years.

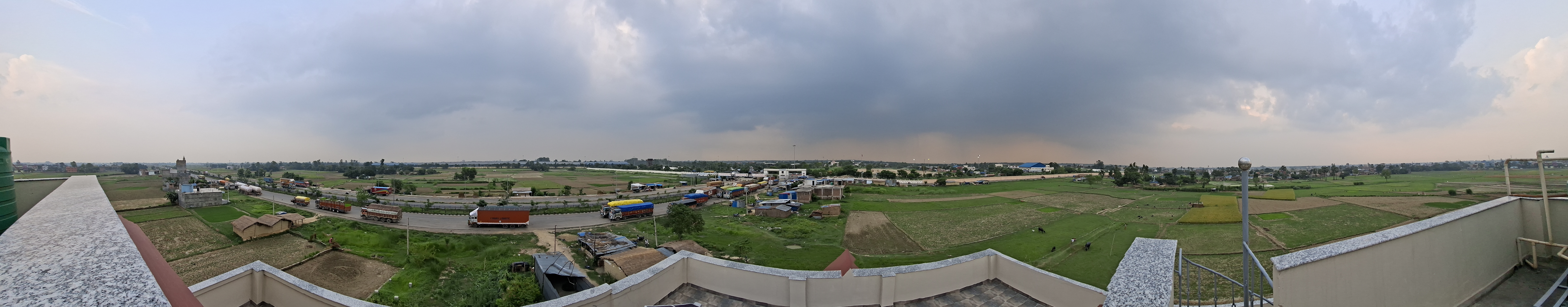
Panoramic view of ICP Birgunj Customs Office

== Rail and road connectivity ==
The ICP is directly connected to the Indian Railways via Raxaul Railway Junction and serves the Dryport Birgunj in Birgunj. This facilitates container movement from Indian seaports such as Kolkata and Visakhapatnam.

== Administration ==
The facility is overseen by the Nepal Intermodal Transport Development Board (NITDB), under the Ministry of Industry, Commerce and Supplies.

== Merger of Birgunj Customs Office and Birgunj Dry Port ==
The Birgunj Customs Office and Birgunj Dry Port are undergoing a merger as part of an administrative restructuring by the Government of Nepal. The integration aims to streamline trade processes, reduce bureaucratic delays, and enhance operational efficiency at Nepal's busiest inland trade gateway.Now the dry port is also known by the name of Birgunj Customs Office.

=== Background ===
Birgunj Dry Port, Nepal's first Inland Container Depot (ICD), handles the majority of the country's cross-border trade with India. Meanwhile, the Birgunj Customs Office regulates customs clearance for goods entering via the Sirsiya (Birgunj) border point. The merger seeks to unify their functions under a single authority.

=== Objectives ===
- Centralize customs and logistics operations.
- Reduce cargo clearance time for importers/exporters.
- Optimize infrastructure utilization at the Dry Port.

=== Current Status ===
A high-level committee has been formed to oversee the merger, with full implementation expected by 2025.

== Facilities ==
The ICP is equipped with:

- Electronic weighbridges
- Container yards and warehouses
- Cold storage and quarantine facilities

== See also ==
- ICP Raxaul
- Dryport Birgunj
- India–Nepal relations
- Department of Customs (Nepal)
