= 2015–16 Nepal blockade =

Economic and humanitarian crisis in Nepal

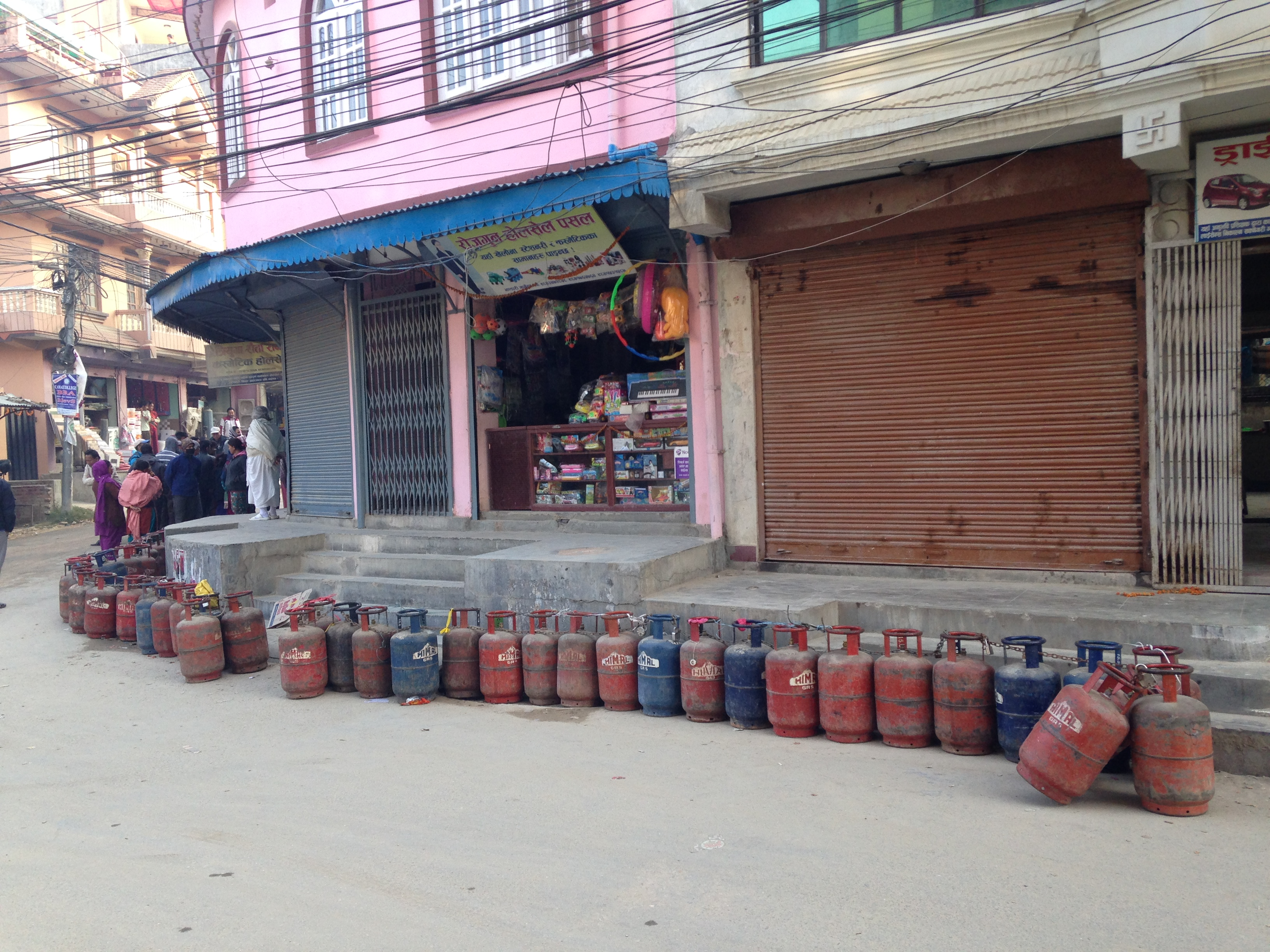
Shortages of bottled gas caused a fuel crisis during the blockade

Beginning on 23 September 2015, segments of Nepal's Madheshi people imposed a blockage on the country's Indian border as a protest against changes to the country's constitution. Many of Nepal's Madheshi people had migrated to the foothills from the Indian plains, and the Nepalese government accused India of provoking the blockade, which the Indian government denied. The blockade lasted until February 2016.

The blockade, which came just months after the April 2015 Nepal earthquake, severely hampered humanitarian efforts in the earthquake's aftermath, including important food and shelter shipments to people impacted by the earthquake. A landlocked country, Nepal had imported "all" of its petroleum supplies via India at the time of the blockade, meaning the blockade had effectively halted imports of petroleum into the country. This fuel shortage resulted in the shuttering of schools, markets, and public transportation within Nepal. Roughly 300 fuel trucks enter from India on a normal day, but this dwindled to a sporadic passage of 5–10 fuel trucks daily during the crisis, though shipments of perishables like fruits and vegetables had generally been allowed to pass. The blockade also had a severe impact on the country's healthcare system, and it was reported that hospitals had run out of medicines and blood bags as a result. UNICEF and Oxfam warned in November 2015 that the blockade risked subjecting Nepal to a major health crisis that could impact millions. The blockade coincided with the beginning of the 2015–2017 Nepal humanitarian crisis.

Nepal accused India of imposing an undeclared blockade, which India denied, stating that the blockade was on the Nepalese side of the border, and that some Indian truck drivers were simply concerned about their safety amid protest-related clashes. Nevertheless, some have highlighted concerns by the Indian government over the revisions of Nepal's constitution, and over China's influence in Nepal. The Nepal Oil Corporation also reported that trucks it had sent into India to retrieve fuel had only partially been supplied by Indian counterparts.

== Background ==
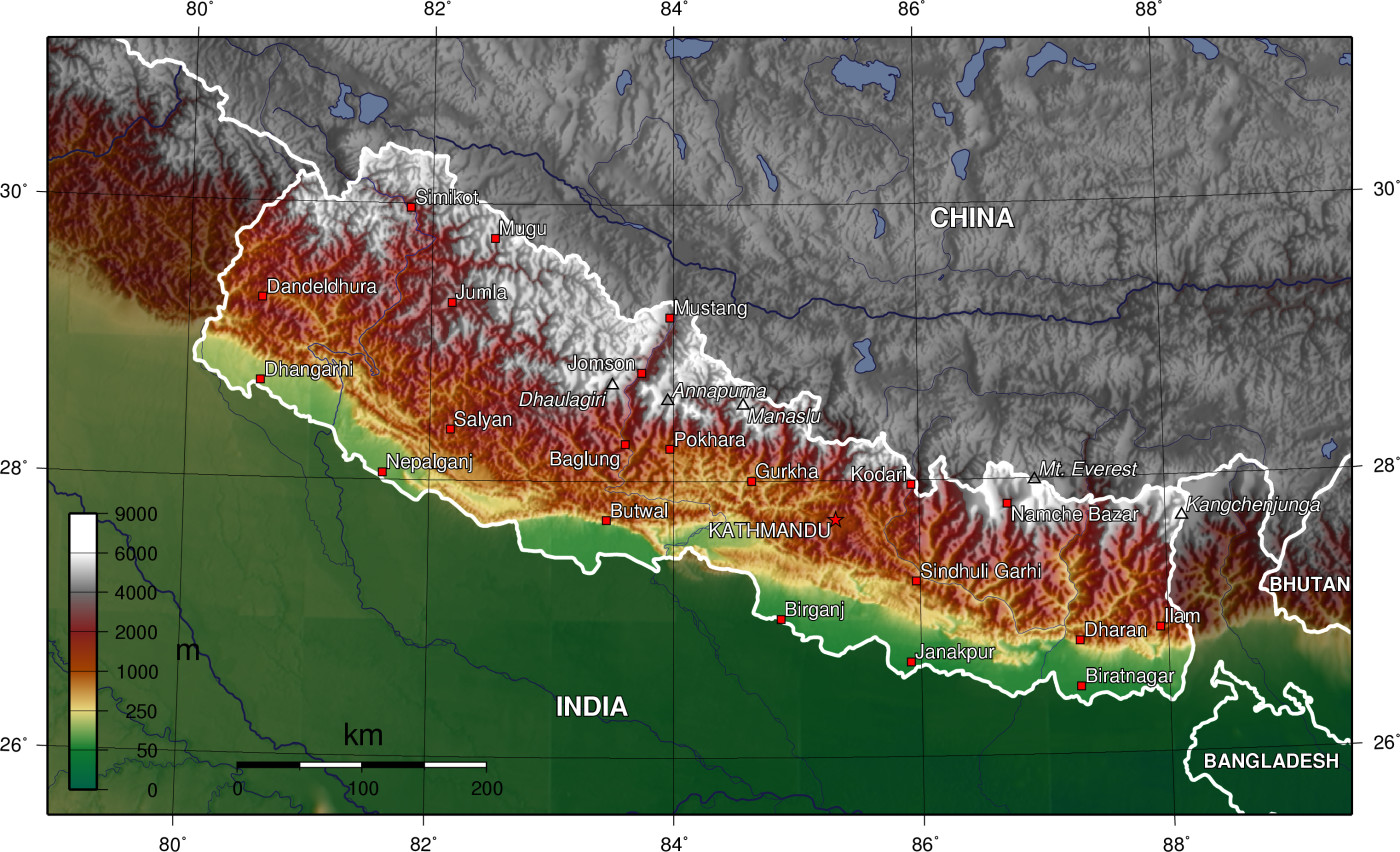
Topographic map of Nepal, showing mountain, hill and plains regions

Provinces of Nepal as per the 2015 constitution

=== Concerns about Nepal's constitution ===
On 20 September 2015, the long-stalled Constitution of Nepal was passed in Nepal's Constituent Assembly. Two ethnic groups — Madheshi people and Tharu people — had been protesting against the new constitution, alleging that it marginalized them. 66 members of Nepal's 598-strong Constituent Assembly, belonging to these groups, abstained from voting in protest. By 20 September, more than 40 people had been killed in clashes between the protesters and the police. There were also bandhs (strikes) declared in the Terai region, curtailing Terai business but otherwise not affecting the rest of the country.

=== Indian concerns ===
India had expressed concerns over the violent protests, and had asked Nepal to take Madhesi interests into consideration. The Indian prime minister Narendra Modi called Sushil Koirala on 25 August, and later sent S. Jaishankar as his personal envoy to discuss the concerns. The government of Nepal and the Nepalese media portrayed Madhesi movements as subversively backed by Indian infiltrators, and as an assault on their sovereignty.

On 24 September, the day that the fuel blockade began, Indian Express newspaper reported that India had demanded specific changes to the new Nepali constitution. While the Indian government denied this claim, the Indian Express reporter stood by his or her original report restating, "these amendments/changes were communicated by New Delhi to Kathmandu". According to commentator Amitava Mukherjee, personnel from the Indian Sashastra Seema Bal (SSB) "confirmed that at least till the third week of September, they had orders from above to intercept fuel shipments to Nepal".

Indian concerns were also exacerbated by the upcoming elections in Bihar and that violence from across the border could spill over to Bihar. There were also speculations that India's Bharatiya Janata Party was using its support to the Madhesi cause to win votes in Bihar.

=== Ties and border ===
Due to an open border between Nepal and India, citizens of both countries can move freely, work, and live across borders without passports. Nepalese citizens moving along the border had long been an issue straining Nepal-India relations. Madheshis share strong socio-cultural ties to the neighbouring Indian states of Bihar and Uttar Pradesh.

Landlocked Nepal, due to its Himalayan location and extremely basic and fragile infrastructure depends on India for almost all its import needs. In 1989, India had closed 19 of the 21 border crossings, after a dispute over renegotiation of lapsed trade and transit treaties between the two countries. Nepal's increasing cooperation with China, including its purchase of Chinese weaponry, was seen as a major factor behind this blockade.

== Effects of blockade ==
The blockade had caused the only international airport to deny foreign carriers fuel, contributing to isolating the landlocked nation from the outside world at a time when the country is still reeling from ongoing landslides blocking border trade with China following the devastating 2015 Nepal earthquake. Meanwhile, none of the $4 billion of internationally donated quake relief funds to the Nepali government have been dispersed to survivors even after many months, causing anger among Nepalis and international agencies alike.

The Nepali government decided to stop providing fuel to private automobiles, including public transport and taxis, for a few days at the beginning so as to distribute the fuel to government and prioritized sector use. As a result, some 2,000 factories were shut down by 1 October. The Nepal Oil Corporation sued Indian Oil Corporation for not allowing the majority of trucks to enter Nepal. The unofficial "Indian Blockade" forced Nepalese to ride bicycles or resort to carpooling, and many also turned to electric vehicles, with demand for electric motorcycles and scooters surging in response to the fuel shortage.

The Nepal oil corporation is the only state-owned company that imports and distributes petroleum in Nepal. It does not have enough facilities to store petroleum for even a few weeks use. The fuel shortage caused the public to be angry due to not getting products like petrol, diesel, cooking gas (LPG), kerosene from the state oil corporation, despite standing in line for days. The government of Nepal had imposed a rule to provide fuel to the public as well as private transportation on the basis of odd and even number plate system. Although this system was imposed, the taxi drivers and private vehicle owners faced huge problems, as they had to wait their vehicles in line for two-three days or more, but still often did not get their required fuel. A black market arose, with individuals bringing fuel from the border points with India and selling it in Kathmandu and other places for threefold prices. For instance, before the Madhesi blockade, a price of a liter of petrol in Kathmandu was 104 rupees, whereas after the blockade, the public was forced to buy petrol from the black marketeers paying 300 to 450 rupees for a liter.

The government of Nepal failed to ease this fuel crisis and could not bring petroleum from China on time, although it signed an agreement to buy one third of Nepal's petroleum requirement from their northern neighbor. This agreement was seen as a cornerstone for Nepal to end the full dependency on only one country for petroleum imports. The common Nepalese were hopeful to get fuel from the northern neighbor. The other Nepal-China border point, Tatopani in Sindhupalchowk district, was not functional after the Nepal earthquake 2015 because of serious damages and obstructions. China had also donated 1.3 million liters of petrol to Nepal after the fuel crisis through the Kerung border point.

The Nepali government spoke of airlifting fuel and essential supplies when the talk with the Indian side was not fruitful. India repeatedly stated the issue lay with the Madheshi people, claiming they were the ones blocking the border points and disrupting supplies. The Indian trucks could not go to Nepal because of the insecurity as the Terai part of Nepal was facing strikes from the period before the Nepal's new constitution was declared. Some reports also came in Nepali media that the Madheshi protesters were sitting on Indian land and throwing stones at Nepal. The government of Nepal was also unable to convey the true message to the International communities about the problem in Nepal at a time when some Nepali scholars were asking the government to Internationalize the issue, as India had moved back from the Nepal India friendship treaty and violated the various International trade, transit and commerce laws. While in Kathmandu, the government had asked for International help to solve the fuel crisis, which was hitting daily Nepalese life very hard. Nepal government started selling firewood in Kathmandu because there were acute shortage of cooking gas (liquified petroleum gas), causing households to resort to buying electrical induction cookers. As Nepal faced big energy problems and power cuts, using induction cookers would not be a permanent alternative to cooking gas.

The Government of India denied imposing a blockade, stating that the truck drivers coming from India were not entering Nepal due to safety concerns resulting from the violent protests. India's Ministry of External Affairs stated that the border obstructions were a result of "unrest, protests, and demonstrations on the Nepalese side, by sections of their population." The Government of Nepal contested India's claim, stating that there were no major security concerns that would prevent the trucks from entering Nepal. Nepal's spokesperson Laxmi Prasad Dhakal argued that the Madheshi protests had been happening since past few months, and Indian trucks had been entering Nepal until 23 September without any problems.

On 1 October, Indian minister Sushma Swaraj officially denied Nepal's accusations. India's spokesperson Vikas Swarup pointed out that India had sent 4,310 trucks to the border, where they had been stranded. He argued that from there onwards, it was Nepal's responsibility to ensure that the trucks entered Nepal safely. On the other hand, it is reported that the vehicles weren't allowed to enter Nepal by the Indian side thus resulting in long queues of Nepalese trucks stranded for days Inside the Indian border. The Indian Oil Corporation reportedly refused to fill the Nepalese trucks following instructions from higher authorities.

On 6 October, the Madheshi-centric Nepal Sadbhawana Party criticized the Nepali media reports blaming the blockade on India. Its President Rajendra Mahato stated that the blockade had been done by the Madheshi people and that India had nothing to do with it. The Indians alleged that the Maoists, who dominate the Nepali politics, were promoting a false propaganda against India. An editorial in the Nepali Times has claimed the Indian blockade is no longer about the Madhes and the constitution, but rather that India also seems to be opposed to KP Oli replacing Sushil Koirala as prime minister, and has a whole host of demands on security and other issues that we haven't even heard about.

There is no gas, no vegetable supplies, no fuel for vehicles, no fuel for airlines, and life is about frozen. We don't want this type of friendship. (In reference to 1950 Indo-Nepal friendship treaty) —Khadga Prasad Oli UML Chair & Prime minister-designate of Nepal

Nepal has lobbied the United Nations on the obstruction.

On 28 October, the Nepal Oil Corporation and PetroChina signed an agreement to import fuel from China, the first fuel agreement ever between the two nations. China also pledged to donate 1,300,000 L (290,000 imp gal; 340,000 US gal) of fuel to Nepal. Nepal is planning to import a third of its fuel from China.

=== Cascading shortages ===
Nearly all sectors of the economy have taken a severe hit, from tourism to transport to domestic factories to agriculture. The once vigorous construction industry had already come to a standstill before the blockade due to quake fears, new enforcement of building code, and monsoon issues, most reconstruction work has been put off until after the monsoon. Tourism, a mainstay of hard currency, already saw 40% cancellation post-quake, since then new advisories from Germany to US have been issued due to Madhesi related issues., many restaurants remain closed in tourist zones and transport remains at best a hack. Basic goods, mostly imported from India, remain in short supply. Some 14 Nepali pharmaceutical factories remain shut, causing widespread shortages in medicine, including for infectious diseases such as Tuberculosis that do not respect borders, some 90 percent of raw and packaging materials usually enter from Birgunj customs point (India). People have resorted to illegal imports of medicines from India, putting patients at risk. The most acute shortages of medicines in Kathmandu are for Intensive Care Unit such as high blood pressure, diabetes, anesthesia, injectable antibiotics, and hyperbaric oxygen. In more remote areas zero supplies of medicines have come within 2 months, resulting in complete lack of medicines including vaccines and Oxygen. Rice paddy production was already forecast to shrink by 18-20 percent due to several factors. The poor South Asian monsoon and chemical fertilizer shortage, improper seeds from post-quake international donations not suited to climate account for some 10% of the expected crop (half of the crop failure), however due to the fuel crisis the figure is expected to worsen sharply as machinery and fertilizer are affected, manpower is limited due to mass overseas migration of young males, disproportionately leaving elderly and children behind to tend to farms. To provide heat, people have been increasing turning to electric heaters, causing increasing burden on electricity transmission and supply, with some 530 transformers having already exploded as of December.

=== Humanitarian crisis ===
More than 3 million children under the age of 5 in Nepal are at risk of death or disease during the harsh winter months due to a severe shortage of fuel, food, medicines and vaccines. —UNICEF media press release, 30 November 2015

As issue of post-quake vulnerability became lost in the increasingly vocal information war between Kathmandu and New Delhi, a major humanitarian crisis has erupted at a time when international agencies are stretched very thin due to El Nino related agricultural disasters as well as exploding conflict in Syria, Yemen, and their spawned refugee crises. UNICEF has followed with a warning echoing US embassy statements about the looming humanitarian disaster, citing 3 million children at risk of disease and death in Nepal alone. On a separate note, while governments focus on immediate needs and politics, misanthropes take advantage of the situation, in particular human trafficking; some 400 girls who have entered India from Nepal have gone missing.

== Overseas protests against blockade ==
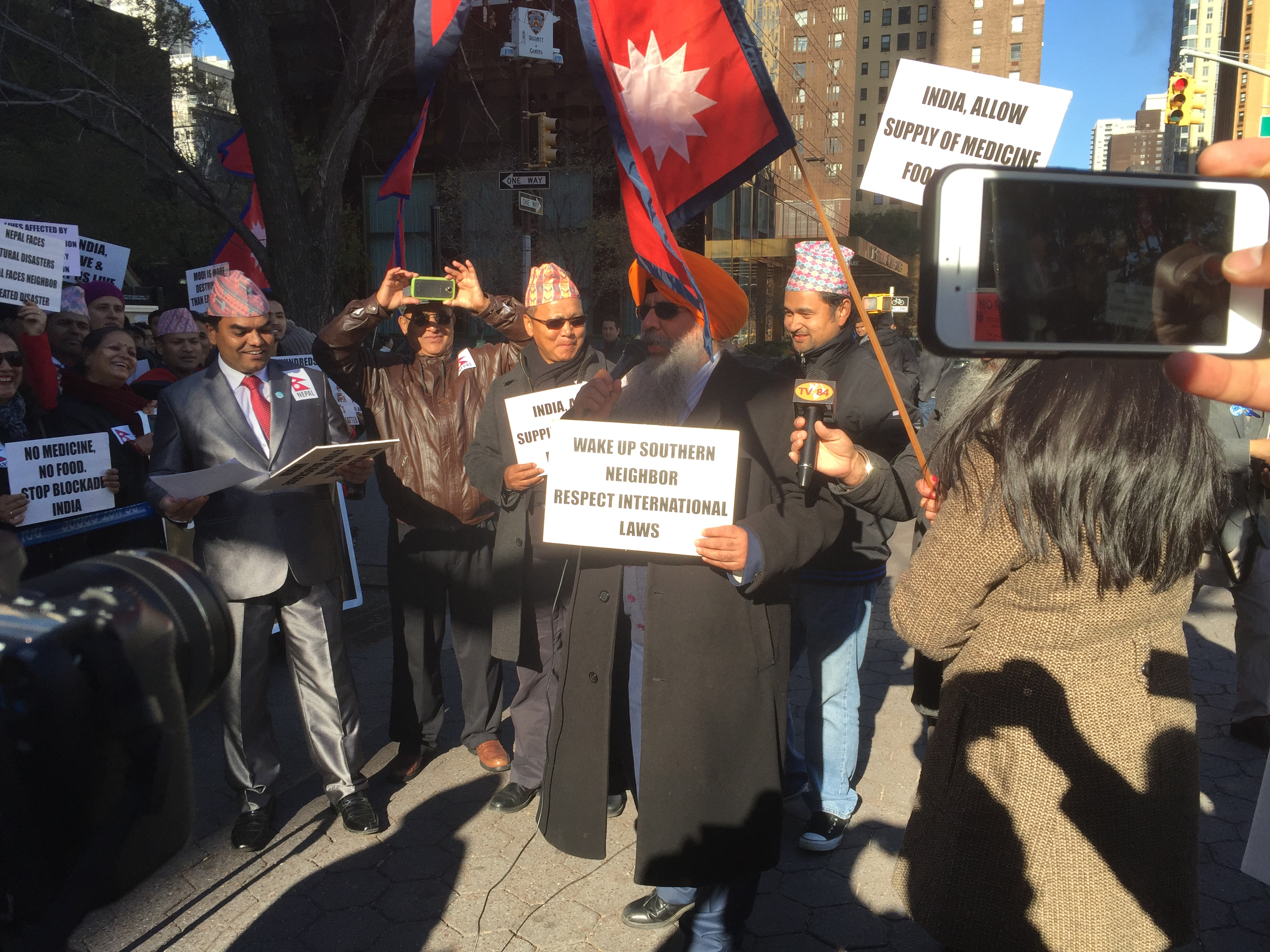
Protest in the United States against the blockade

Nepalese residing in the UK demonstrated against the Indian Prime Minister Narendra Modi at 10 Downing Street, London during his visit on 12 November 2015. The demonstrators included ex-military families (the so-called "Gurkha Regiment" and "non-Gurkhas"), Sikh extremists and various other individuals dissatisfied with the Indian Prime Minister. Some reports claimed that as soon as Modi arrived back in Delhi, he ordered an assessment of the power that the Nepali people have in Great Britain and other places overseas On 17 November, the "Non-Resident Nepali Association USA" protested against what they refer to as the Indian Government's so-called "economic blockade of Nepal" in front of United Nations Headquarters in New York. Also on 30 November in the United States, another branch of the same "non-resident Nepali" group protested in front of India's embassy in Washington, D.C..

== Police action against the protesters ==
On 2 November 2015, Nepal Police moved in to clear out the protesters in Birgunj. Despite police actions, the protesters managed to return and continue the blockade. Protesters attacked a Nepalese police station with petrol bombs and stones. In retaliation, the police opened fire, killing one person, Ashish Kumar Ram, who was later identified as an Indian citizen, which raised concerns over involvement of Indians in the Madhesh protests. Six Nepalese police officers were injured in the attack and more than 25 protesters and civilians were injured. Since then, a curfew has been imposed in Birgunj.

On 21 November, Nepalese police clashed with protesters led by Samyukta Loktantrik Madhesi Morcha (SLMM) in the district of Saptari who were blocking vehicles from entering Nepal. Around 5,000 protesters were involved. Nepalese police shot and killed three protesters at Bhardaha, Rupani and Rajbiraj. Another protester was killed on 22 November in Rajbiraj. Afterwards, a curfew was imposed on all three towns. To complicate matters, Tharuhat protestors of Tharu descent, also Madhesis, have clashed with the Madhesi parties seeking their own separate state different from Madhesi parties in the Western Terai zone.

Separately, Federal Limbuwan State Council (FLSC), representing different ethnic groups (Mongoloids) than the Madhesis (Indo-Aryans), represents the most ancient of the indigenous groups of Nepal, who have historically had a large degree of autonomy in the Far East Terai. FLSC have been striking and enforcing vehicular bans on a separate region of the Terai for the entire time the Madhesis have been active doing the same; their demands overlap Madhesh demands and territories of states, both demands cannot be reconciled geographically. Madhesi parties have refrained from direct confrontation with FLSC. FLSC and the Mongoloid voice of the nation been almost completely ignored by all Western and Indian media; they don't have the backing of India nor Kathmandu. Nevertheless, India perceives FLSC as a pro-Nepal force. FLSC has also accused Kathmandu of use of excessive brutal police forces just as the Madhesi parties have. KP Oli, Nepal's PM, issued a statement from Itahari (where FLSC is most active) in December 2015, "The government will not spare those who take the law in their hands ... and air secessionist views, a veiled threat to FLSC actions.

== Indian border police action ==
On 25 November, Indian Sashastra Seema Bal (SSB) border police shot four Madhesi Nepali youths at the border. According to Nepali officials, the youths were trying to bring food and fertilizer into Nepal, and the shooting took place at Bhantabari, Sunsari District on the Nepalese side of the border. The SSB denied this, stating that the shooting took place in the Indian territory facing Nepal's Haripur village. The SSB also claimed that the people shot at were smuggling prohibited materials, and attacked its personnel when stopped. Nepalese government quickly responded with 1 million rupees in compensation to 4 victims' families dispensed within 2 days.

== Attacks on Nepali media ==
In spite of an apparent agreement hashed out between India and Nepal, Madhesis stated their demands were still not met. Madhesi protesters have stepped up attacks against Nepali media outlets, with a Kathmandu Post media van torched on 28 December. India has also been stepping up its control of information in late December, with Sashastra Seema Bal wanting to install radio stations along the border.

== Resolution ==
We failed to create pressure on the government by blocking border points, we only caused suffering to ordinary people. —Rajendra Mahato, senior leader of Unified Madhesi Front

India and Nepal seemed to have worked out their differences with passage of a constitutional amendment by Nepal, but Madhesi leaders remained defiant, along with other movements of separatists/autonomists. Nevertheless, Madhesis were the only movement with state support from India, but prominent Madhesi leader, Mahato, has backed down as of 4 February 2016.

On 29 March 2016, panic buying caused by worries about another fuel blockade hit Kathmandu, where long lines of motorists formed. The prime minister had just returned from a visit to China with a number of agreements signed that will reduce long term dependence on India. Nepal Oil Corporation reported normal fuel shipments but, even one and a half months after the embargo was lifted, domestic diesel and cooking gas deliveries have not returned to normal.

== Nepalese opinions ==
India officially may not call it a blockade. But it smells like a blockade, it feels like a blockade and sounds like a blockade. —Kanak Mani Dixit, Nepalese journalist and political analyst

The Nepal government has accused India of unofficially backing this protest by slowing or stopping traffic from crossing the border into Nepal completely. However, India has maintained that Nepal's failure to draft an inclusive Constitution is responsible for the unrest. It has also been pointed out by India that the "blockade" is taking place on Nepal's side of the border, where protestors have attacked Indian drivers who were trying to transport food and facilitate trade between the two neighbors.

On 23 September 2015 demonstrators in Kathmandu shouted anti-India slogans to protest the fuel shortage. Nepal Cable Television Association blocked 42 Indian channels in protest against unofficial blockade into the country.

Nepalese political analyst Amit Dhakal stated, "Even a child can make out that it is a deliberate blockade." Kishor Bikram Malla, a student leader of the CPN (UML) party opined, "The new generation of Nepalese can go without fuel for months but we are not ready to bend before India." Similarly, Nepalese political analyst Kanak Mani Dixit contended that Prime Minister of India authorized S. Jaishankar on his conduct towards Nepal:

By all accounts, Jaishankar was uncouth, brash and imperial in his behaviour towards Nepal's politicians. It left no doubt in anybody's mind that the orders had come from the Prime Minister to act tough. Otherwise, Jaishankar is too sophisticated to resort to such things.

CPN (UML) has however denied any statement by the then PM KP Sharma Oli against India.

=== #BackOffIndia ===
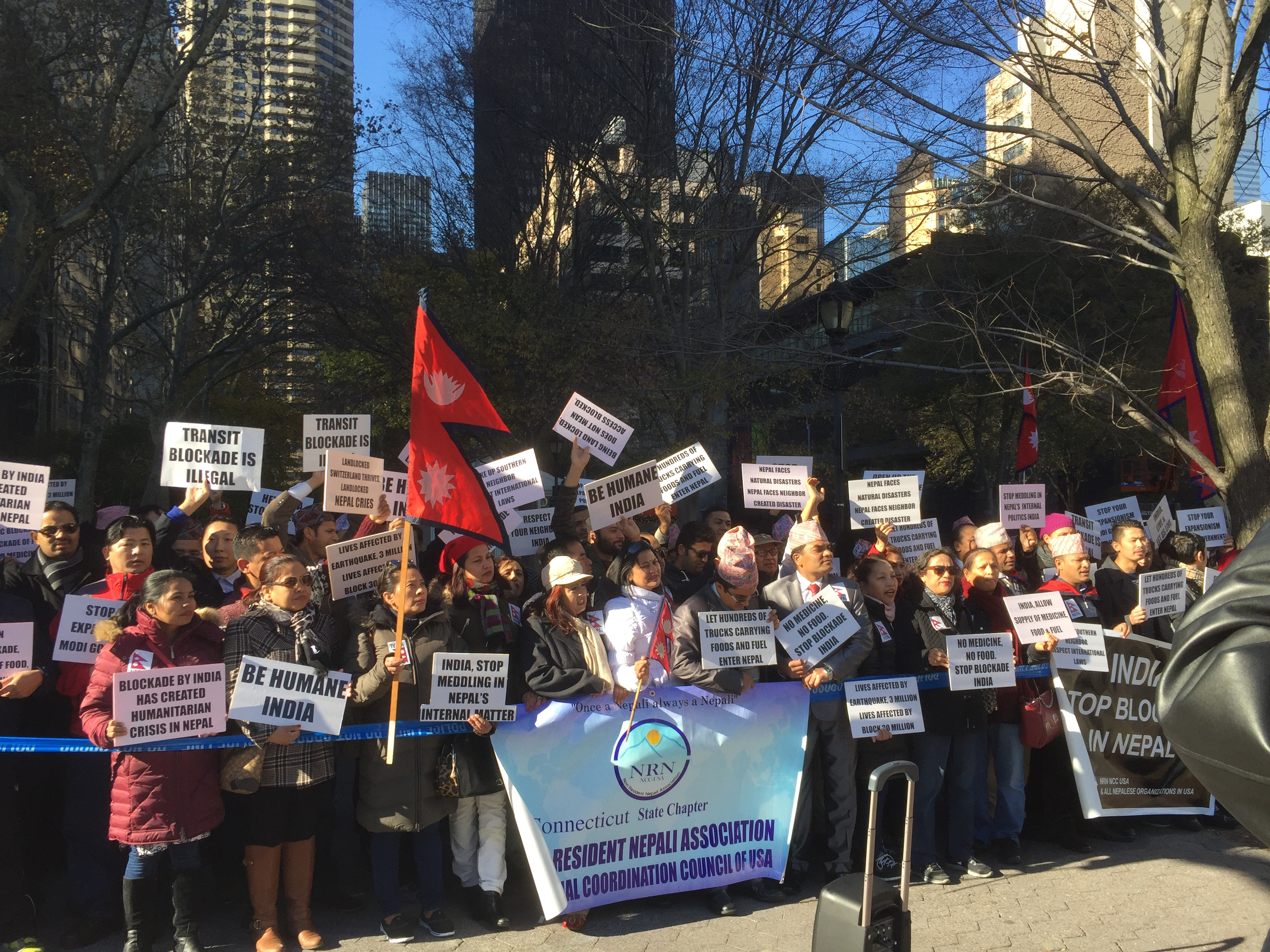
Protest against blockade in Nepal, Protest against Indian maps showing Kalapani territory

#BackoffIndia is a Twitter hashtag and social media campaign against alleged "intervention" by India in Nepal's internal affairs, accusing it of having caused the blockade. The blockade was caused by Madhesi protestors in Nepal who were dissatisfied with the newly adopted Constitution of Nepal. However, the government of India and ruling party at that time held multiple meetings with Madhesi leaders and provoked them to cause blocking. India too participated passively with events like refusing to accept new constitution, orders were sent to border authorities at Indian side to not let any movements of goods across the border.

The hashtag was used by Nepalese around the world to accuse India of interfering in the country's internal matters. During September–December 2015, more than 6,750 tweets have been created in Twitter with this hashtag. When news of the blockage of shipments reached the government, Kathmandu sent additional armed-police forces to the border. Many leaders of various parties claimed India had infiltrated the Madhesh with Indian protesters, and Madheshi leaders refuted the infiltration allegations, stating that the Madheshis should not be mistaken for Biharis or other Indians.

The hashtag was used again in 2019 when the Nepalese Government claimed the 35 km^{2} Kalapani territory at the northwest frontier of Nepal within India's territory. The Kalapani dispute was first raised in 1996 but it became an important issue in 2019. Once again, conspiracy theories give rise to disaffection.

== International reactions ==
Bangladesh – On 18 October, Tofail Ahmed, Minister of Commerce, Bangladesh, urged an end to the blockade and commented that such blockades hit at agreements like the BBIN.

European Union – On 24 October, Jean Lambert, MEP and Chair of the European Parliament Delegation to South Asia, stated the unofficial 'blockade' at the Nepalese border only serves to hurt the Nepalese people who are still recovering from the devastating earthquakes earlier this year.

United States – On 5 November, the US expressed deep concern over the critical shortages of essential supplies in Nepal resulting from a volatile situation along the Nepal-India border.

United Nations – On 11 November, Secretary-General Ban Ki-moon reiterated his "concern over the obstruction of essential supplies on the Nepal-India border. Acute shortages in fuel supplies continue to impede planned deliveries to earthquake-affected villages in Nepal," said spokesman Stephane Dujarric. "The Secretary-General underlines Nepal's right of free transit, as a landlocked nation as well as for humanitarian reasons, and calls on all sides to lift the obstructions without further delay."

== Aftermath ==
In 2016, during Oli's visit to China, the two countries signed a treaty on trade and transit, including a plan to build a high speed railway from Kathmandu to the Chinese border. In June 2018, Nepal and China agreed on construction of the railway as a component of a series of cooperation projects approved by the two sides. A mutual agreement over the pre-feasibility study was reached in August 2018. The railway has been viewed as a way to reduce Nepal's dependence on India, which was made apparent during the 2015 Nepal blockade.

During the COVID-19 pandemic, China closed its border with Nepal, and plans to diversify imports from China failed to materialize.

The blockade had long lasting effects on Nepali households use of petroleum fuels, with poorer households more often continuing to use dirtier fuels such as firewood, whereas richer household moved towards using cleaner energy sources.

== See also ==
- Anti-Indian sentiment
- Foreign policy of India
- Indian influence in Bangladesh

== Bibliography ==
- Nepal's Divisive New Constitution: An Existential Crisis (PDF), International Crisis Group, 2016
- Nepal Blockade: A Humanitarian Crisis amidst Diplomatic Kerfuffle (PDF). South Asians for Human Rights. 2016. ISBN 978-955-1489-18-2.
