= Kharidhunga mine =

Magnesium mine in Bagmati, Nepal

- Location: Bagmati , Nepal
- Products: Magnesium

The Kharidhunga mine is one of the largest magnesium mines in Nepal and in the world. The mine is located in the east of the country in the Janakpur Zone. The mine has estimated reserves of 180 million tonnes of ore 88% magnesium.

== Dolakha-Sindhupalchwok ropeway ==
The Dolakha-Sindhupalchwok ropeway is an ropeway conveyor connecting the talc and magnesium mine at Kharidhunga with the processing plant at Lamosanghu in Nepal. It is one of the longest ropeways in Nepal, crossing two districts: Sindhupalchok and Dolakha. The talc plant used to be 3rd largest talc plant in South Asia.

The ropeway is 10.3 kilometres (6.4 mi) long. It was operational in the 1990s, but has since been closed down. It travels through Kharidhunga, Tauthali, Tekanpur and Lamosangu.

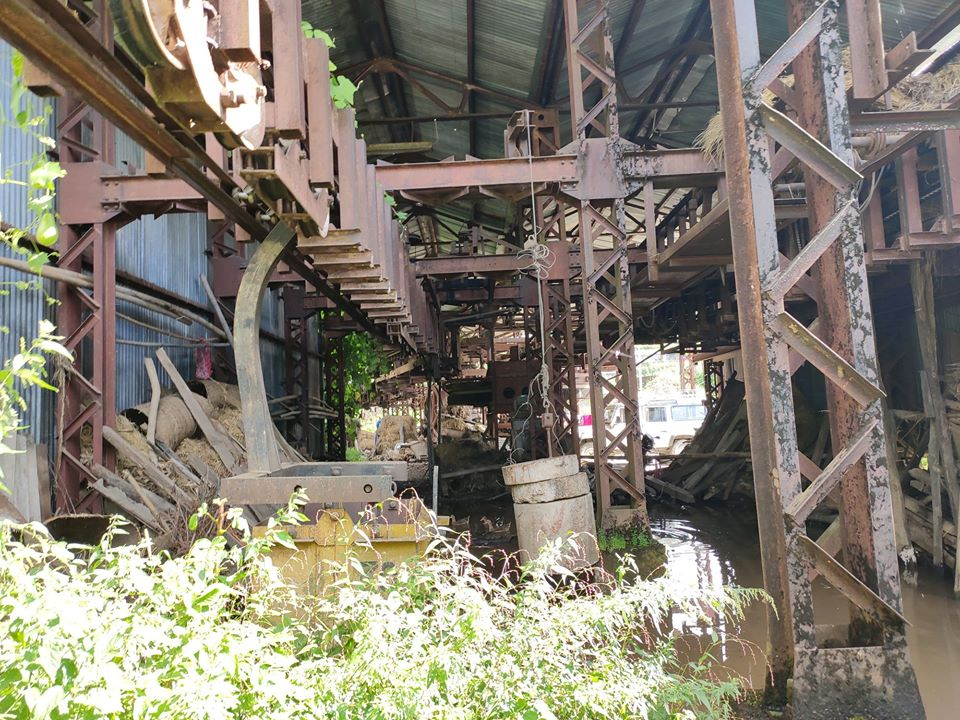

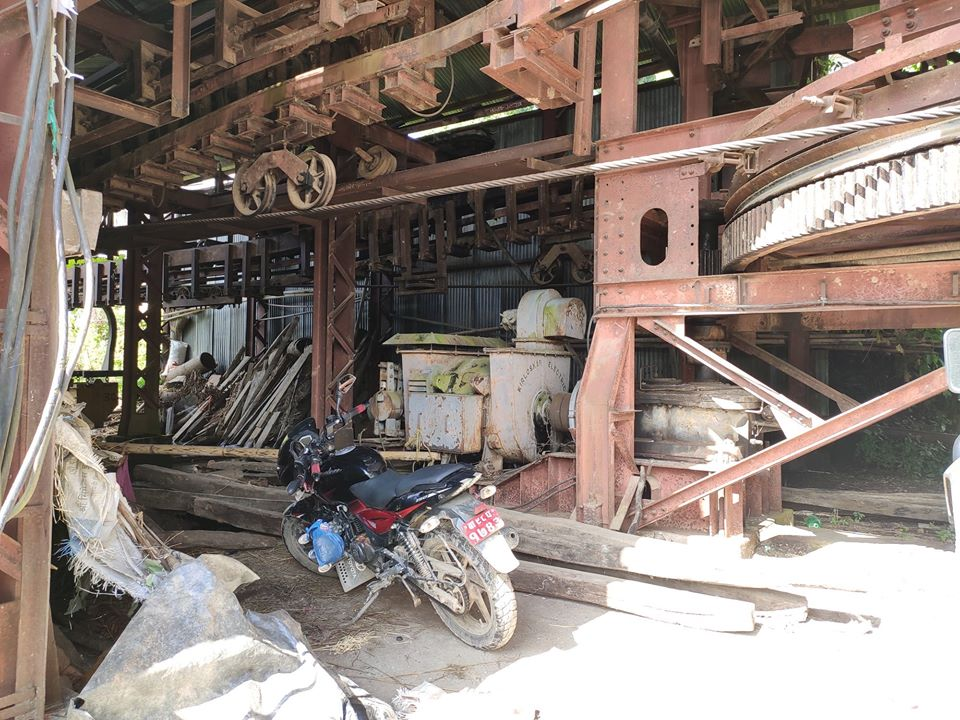

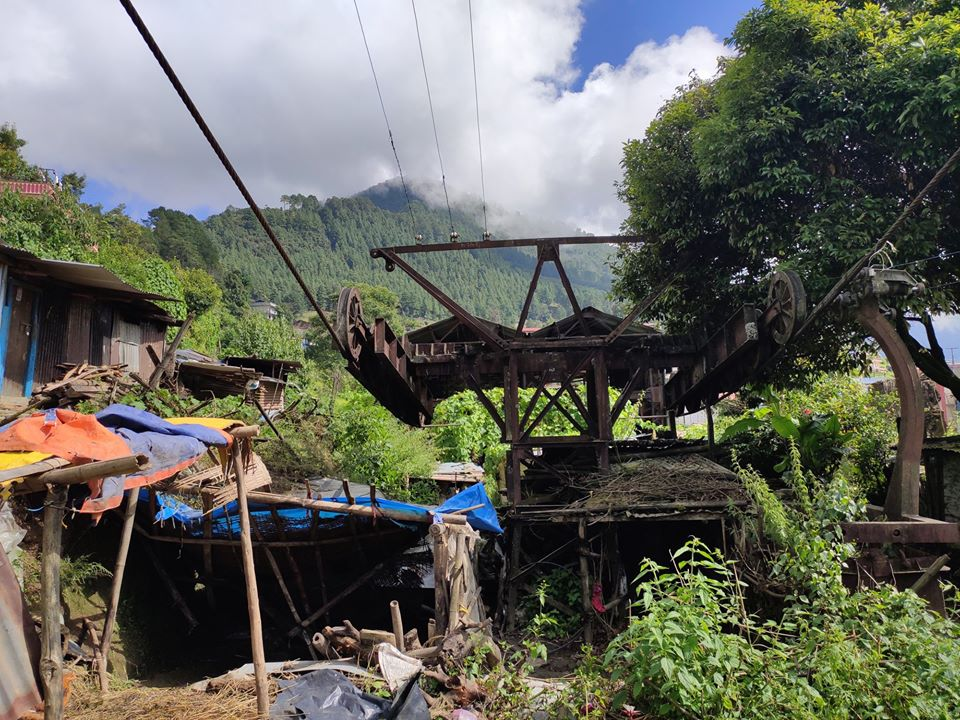

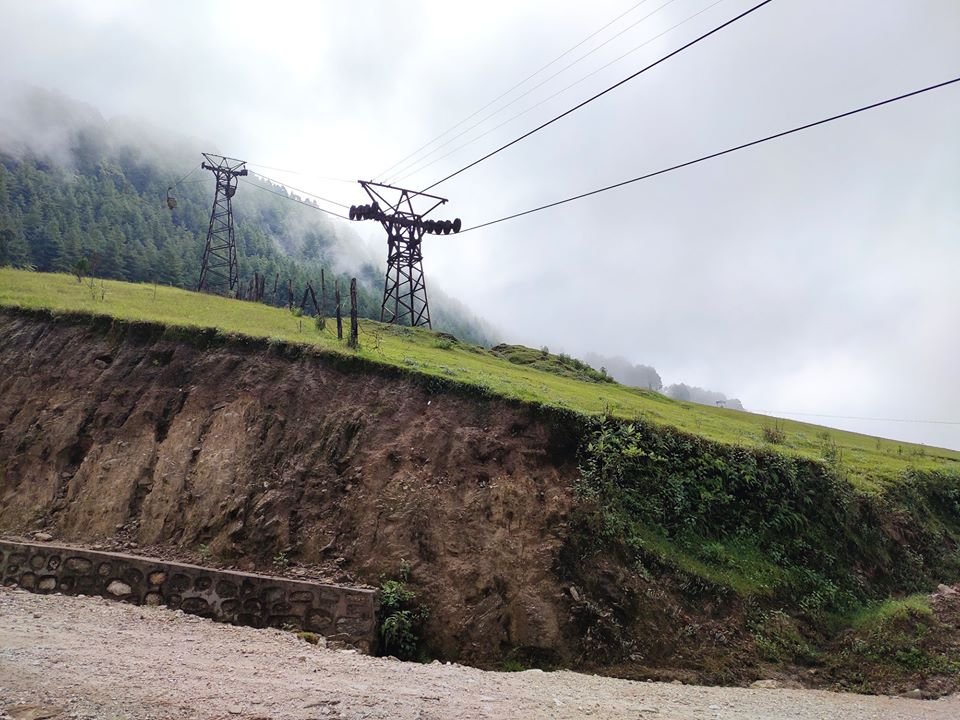
