= Motihari-Amlekhganj pipeline =

Transborder petrolium pipeline between Nepal and India

Motihari-Amlekhganj Oil Pipeline
- Indian Oil Corporation, Motihari Nepal Oil Corporation, Amlekhganj

Location
- Country: India, Nepal
- Direction: South–North
- Start: Motihari
- To: Amlekhganj

General information
- Type: Oil Pipeline
- Partners: Indian Oil Corporation; Nepal Oil Corporation

Technical information
- Length: 69 km (43 mi)
- Maximum discharge: 2 million tonnes per year

Motihari-Amlekhganj pipeline
Pipeline route

Motihari-Amlekhgunj pipeline is a 69 km (43 mi) long trans-border petrolium pipeline between Amlekhgunj Oil Depot in Parsa of Nepal and Motihari of India. This pipeline transports petroleum from Indian Oil Corporation (IOC) to Nepal Oil Corporation (NOC). It is also the first ever trans-national pipeline in the Indian subcontinent. It has an annual capacity of two million metric tonnes.

== History ==
The pipeline was first proposed in 1996. An agreement was reached between the NOC and IOC in 2004. The project finally was set for construction after the visit of Indian prime minister Narendra Modi to Kathmandu in 2014. Both governments inked an agreement to execute the project in August 2015. However, the project construction was delayed due to the 2015 earthquake in Nepal and supply obstruction along the southern border. The project construction works finally began in April 2018 and were completed in April 2020. The pipeline was jointly inaugurated by the Prime ministers of India and Nepal on 10 September 2019.

The pipeline displaces the need to carry petroleum products from India to Nepal by tankers that was done since 1973. The pipeline is expected to save NPR 2 billion annually on transportation.

The project was constructed in 15 months, though the actual duration allocated was 30 months.

== Features of pipeline ==
- 32.25 km (20.04 mi) of the pipeline lies in Indian territory (from Raxaul to Motihari) and the 37.25 km (23.15 mi) in Nepal from Raxaul to Amlekhgunj
- About 6,500 large trees and about 4,000 small trees were cut off in the Parsa National Park area for the construction of the pipeline.
