= Dahi Jatra =

Annual ritual in Tauthali village, Nepal

Curd Splashing Festival
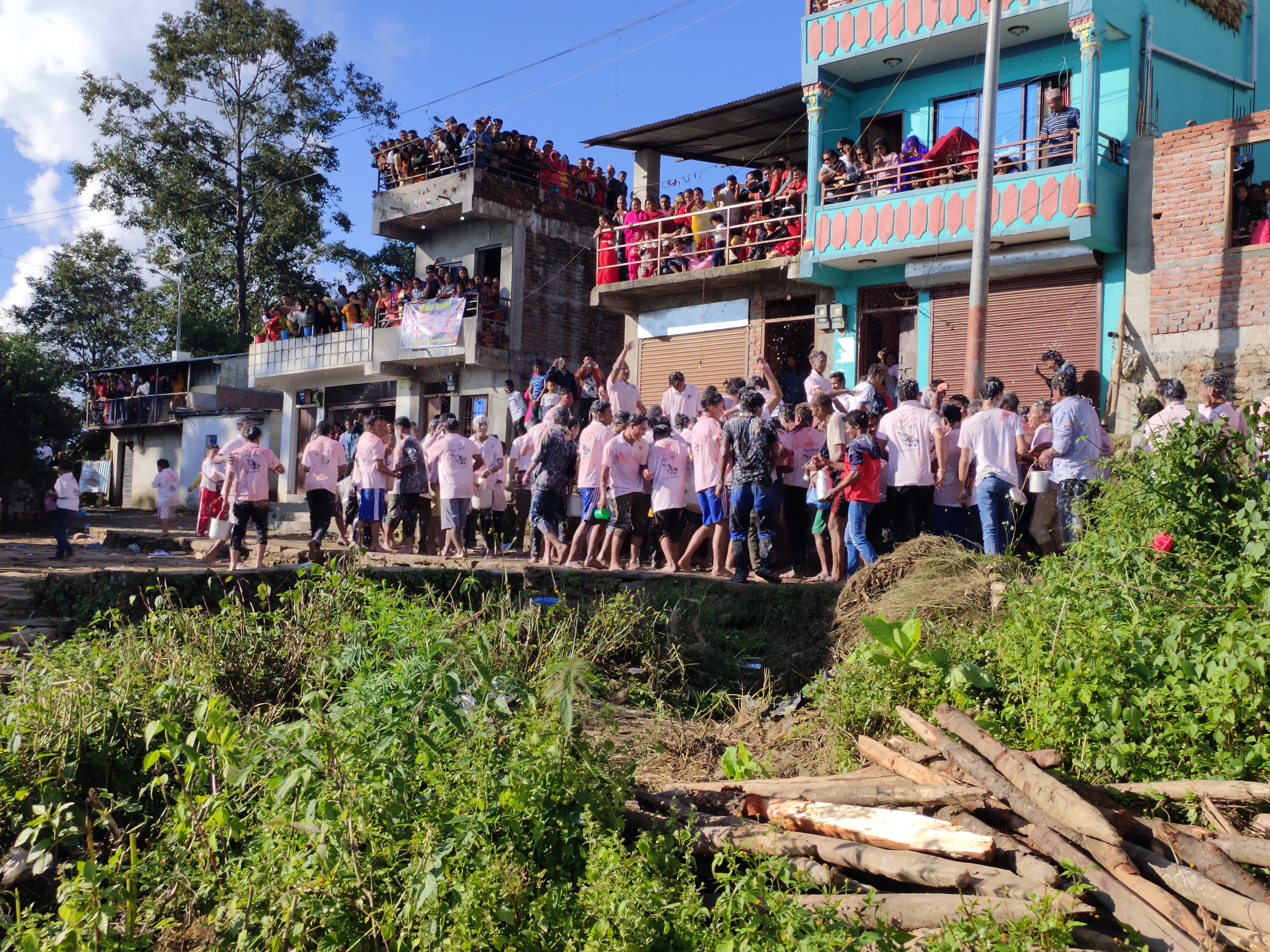
- Dahi Jatra in 2019
- Official name: दही जात्रा
- Observed by: Newar, Tauthali, Nepal
- Observances: Dashain Festival
- Date: last wednesday October
- Frequency: annual
- Related to: Newar Community (Hindu Culture)

Curd Splashing Festival (दही जात्रा) is an annual ritual performed by the local people (especially youth) of Tauthali village. It takes place the day after Bijaya Dashami. Locals who are involved in this jatra splatter curd (in south Asia, curd refers to a traditional home-made yogurt, dahi) on one another. Dahi Jaatraa begins with an offering of curd to the local goddess Tripura Sundari Mai, held in Tripura village body (त्रिपुरा गाउँपलिका) of Sindhupalchok District.

This tradition is celebrated only at Tauthali, in the temple of goddess Shree Tripura Sundari Maai. It is similar to the La Tomatina festival held in Spain, where participants throw tomatoes at other participants for fun. In this jatra participants use curds to throw at participants for both entertainment and traditional purposes. After the festival, participants' bodies and the goddess Shree Tripura Sundari Maai Temple is covered in curd, which makes devotees strenuous to walk and performed another rituals (Linggo Jaatraa) properly.

This tradition started in the 13th century during the rule of Malla dynasty. Before centuries, farmers who kept cattle in the village used to offer curd to goddess Tripura Sundari Maii, believing that she would bless them so that they would be able to produce more curd next year.

Before decades, the curd splashing in this place would bring a stream of curd flowing down the area during the ritual due to the sheer amount of curd that used to be splashed. But the amount of curd brought for the ritual has diminished over the years as the number of farmers rearing cattle has been reduced in this community. Locals and a few organizations are trying to preserve this tradition so that younger generations would get the chance to see this distinctive festival of Nepal (तौथली).
