= Binayi Tribeni Rural Municipality =

Binayi Tribeni Rural Municipality विनयी त्रिवेणी गाउँपालिका
- Gaunpalika
- Location in Nepal
- Coordinates: 27.604339°N 83.949399°E
- Country: Nepal
- Province: Gandaki
- District: Nawalpur District

Area
  - Total: 288 km^{2} (111 sq mi)

Population
  - Total: 33,119
  - Density: 115/km^{2} (298/sq mi)
- Time zone: UTC+5:45 (Nepal Time)
- Website: http://binayitribenimun.gov.np/

Binayi Tribeni Rural Municipality (Nepali :विनयी त्रिवेणी गाउँपालिका) is a Gaunpalika in Nawalpur District in Gandaki Province of Nepal. On 12 March 2017, the government of Nepal introduced a new local administrative structure, replacing Village Development Committees (VDCs) with municipalities and village councils. Binayi Tribeni is one of the 753 local units established under this system.
