= Rampur, Bihar =

Rampur
- Village
- Location within Bihar
- Coordinates: 27.108°N 84.464°E
- Country: India
- State: Bihar
- District: West Champaran district

Languages
  - Official: Hindi
- Time zone: UTC+5:30 (IST)
- ISO 3166 code: IN-BR

Rampur is a village in West Champaran district in the Indian state of Bihar. This village is famous for khaini, which is a smokeless tobacco product.

== Demographics ==
As of the 2011 census of India, Rampur had a population of 2191 distributed among 380 households. Men constitute 52.53% of the population and women 47.46%. Rampur has an average literacy rate of 45.59%, lower than the national average of 74%: male literacy is 62.86%, and female literacy is 37.13%. In Rampur, 20.3% of the population is under 6 years of age.
