= Yashodhara Rural Municipality =

Yashodhara Rural Municipality Birendra yadav यसोधरा गाउँपालिका
- Gaunpalika
- Location in Nepal
- Coordinates: 27.475305°N 83.005656°E
- Country: Nepal
- Province: Lumbini Province
- District: Kapilvastu District

Government
  - Type: Chairman-council government

Area
  - Total: 68.66 km^{2} (26.51 sq mi)

Population
  - Total: 38,952
  - Density: 567.3/km^{2} (1,469/sq mi)
- Time zone: UTC+5:45 (Nepal Time)
- Postal code: 32800
- Area code: 076
- Website: http://yasodharamun.gov.np/

Yashodhara Rural Municipality (Nepali :यसोधरा गाउँपालिका) is a Gaunpalika in Kaplivastu District in Lumbini Province of Nepal. On 12 March 2017, the government of Nepal implemented a new local administrative structure, with the implementation of the new local administrative structure, VDCs have been replaced with municipal and Village Councils. Yashodhara is one of these 753 local units.
