= Tauthali =

Tauthali तौथली
- Village
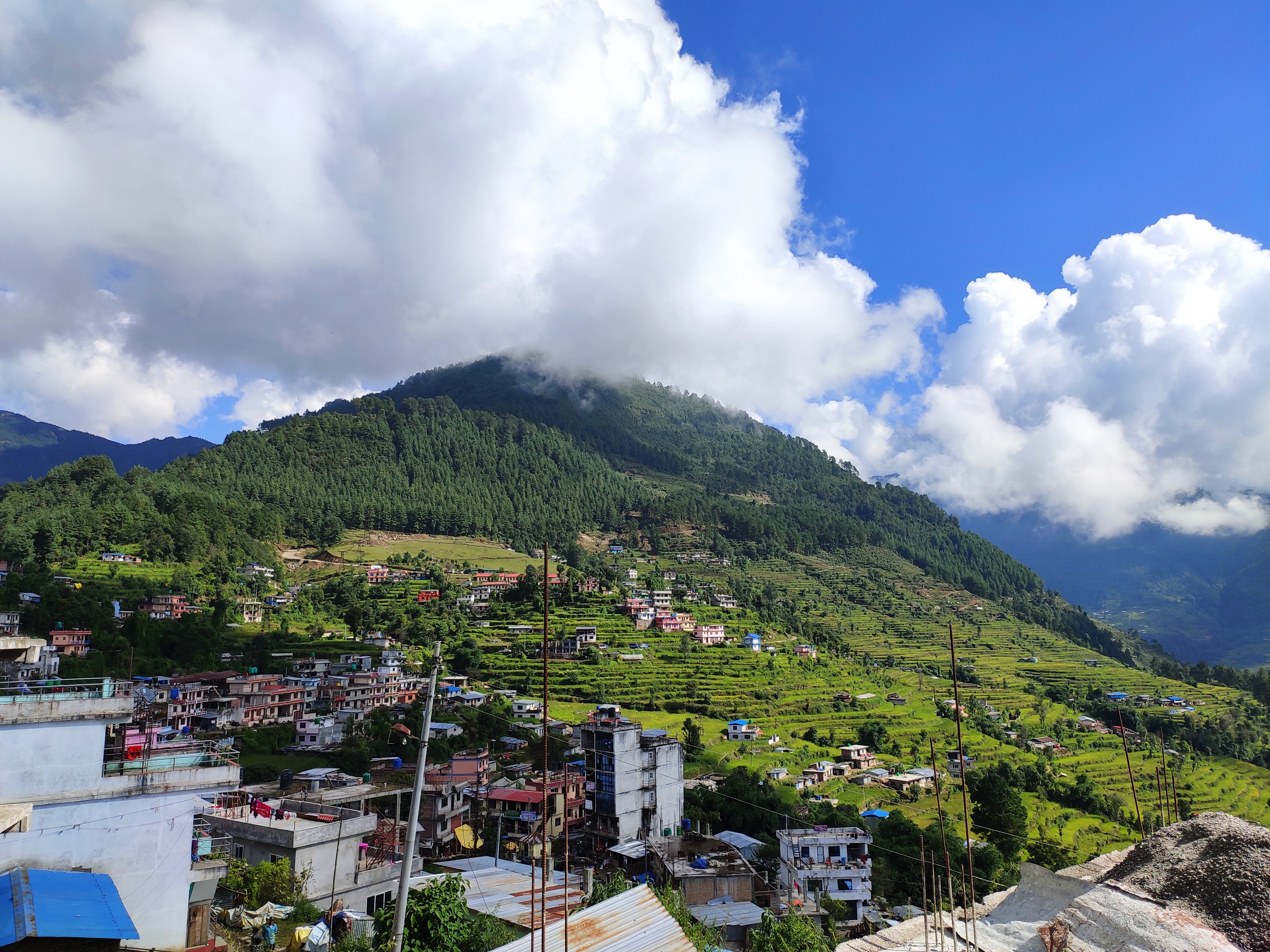
- Shikharchuli view

- Location in Nepal
- Coordinates: 27.73°N 85.91°E
- Country: Nepal
- Province: Bagmati Province
- District: Sindhupalchok District

Population (2011)
  - Total: 2,762
- Time zone: UTC+5:45 (Nepal Time)

Tauthali (Nepali: तौथली) is a village in Sindhupalchok District in Bagmati Province, central Nepal. Tauthali is 110 km away from Kathmandu.

As of 2011 census, the population was 2,762 (1,507 females and 1,255 males) in 776 households.

In the devastating earthquake of 2015, almost every house was destroyed including religious sites such as the temple of Tripura Sundari Mai. Within three years of the disaster, almost all houses had been rebuilt, completely transforming the village compared to before the earthquake.

== Notable attractions ==
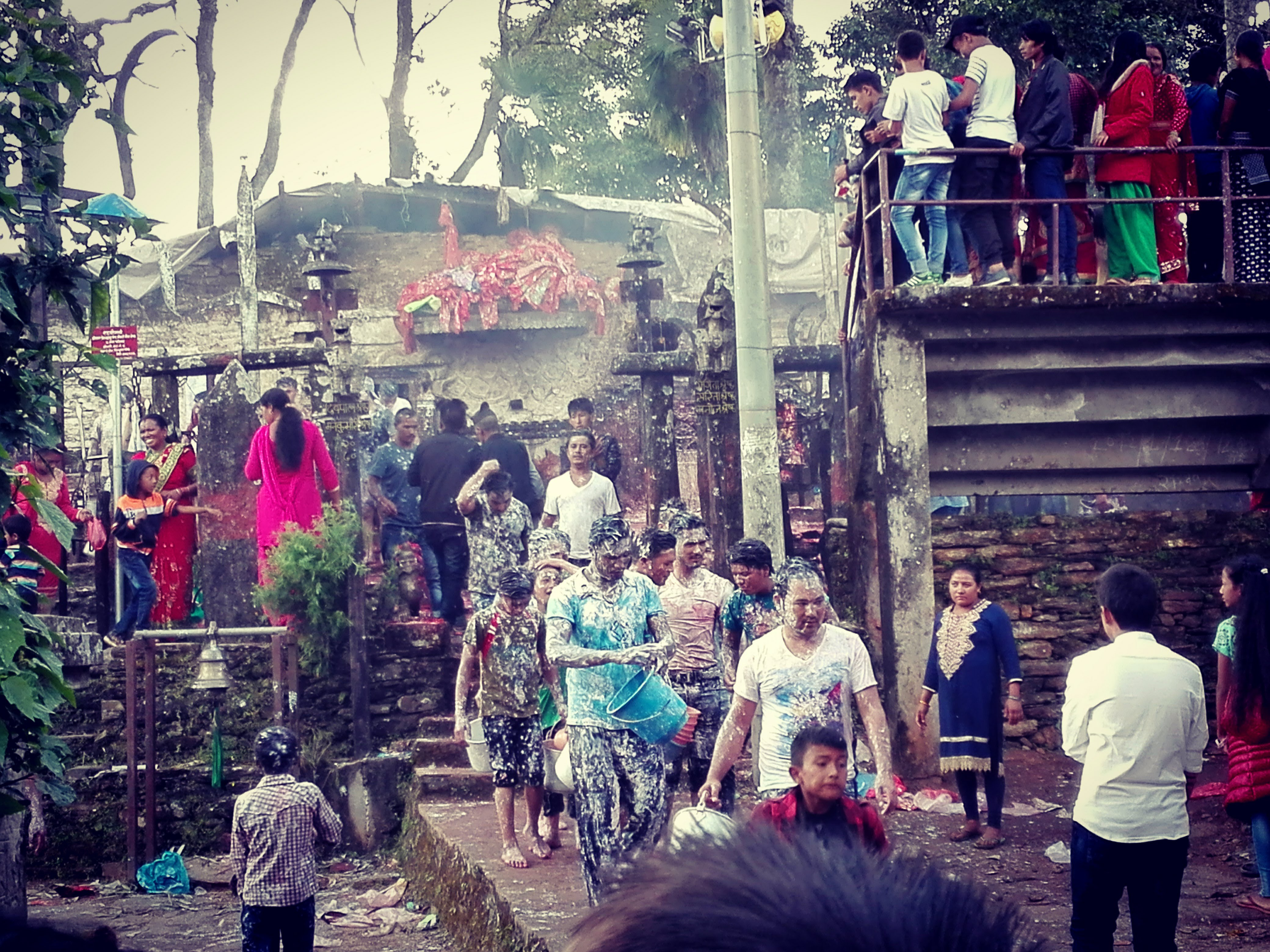
Youth playing with curd to celebrate Dahi Jatra

- The Tripura Sundari Mai temple
- Bhimeshwor temple
- Dahi Jatra, a jatra (street festival) celebrated by people splashing yoghurt on each other, in reverence to the Hindu goddess, Tripura Sundari

== Gallery ==
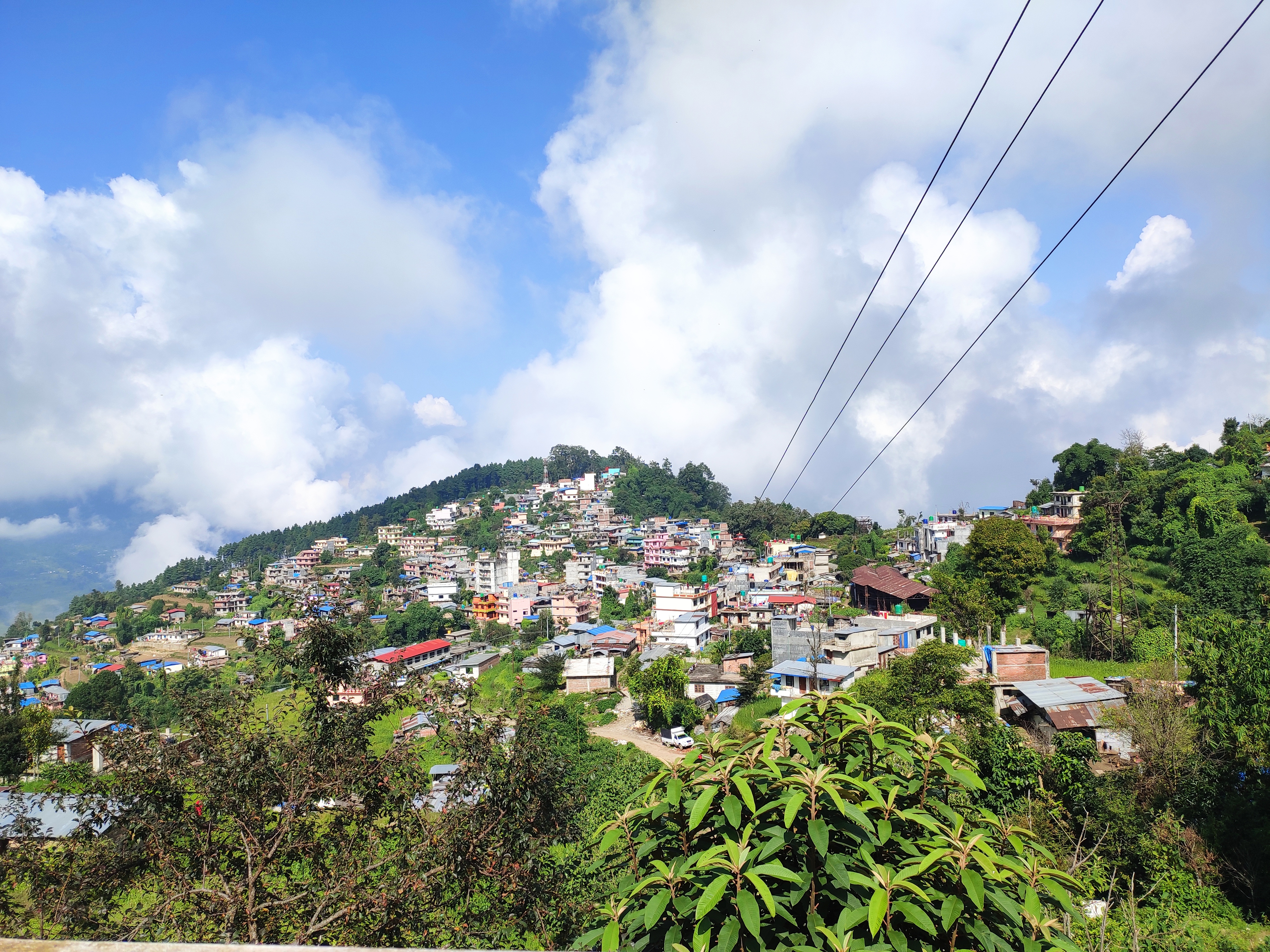
Tauthali Village

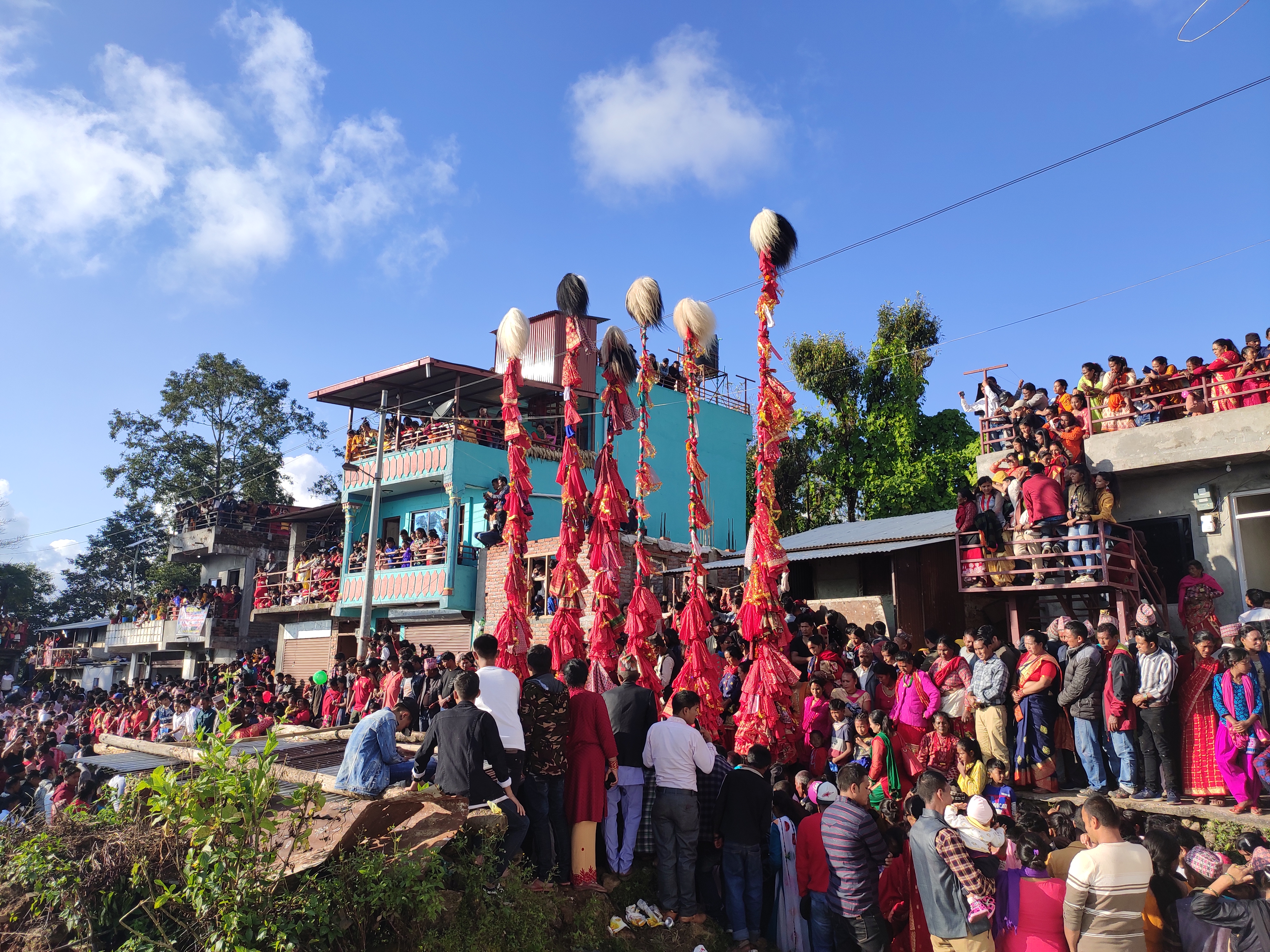
Newar dance

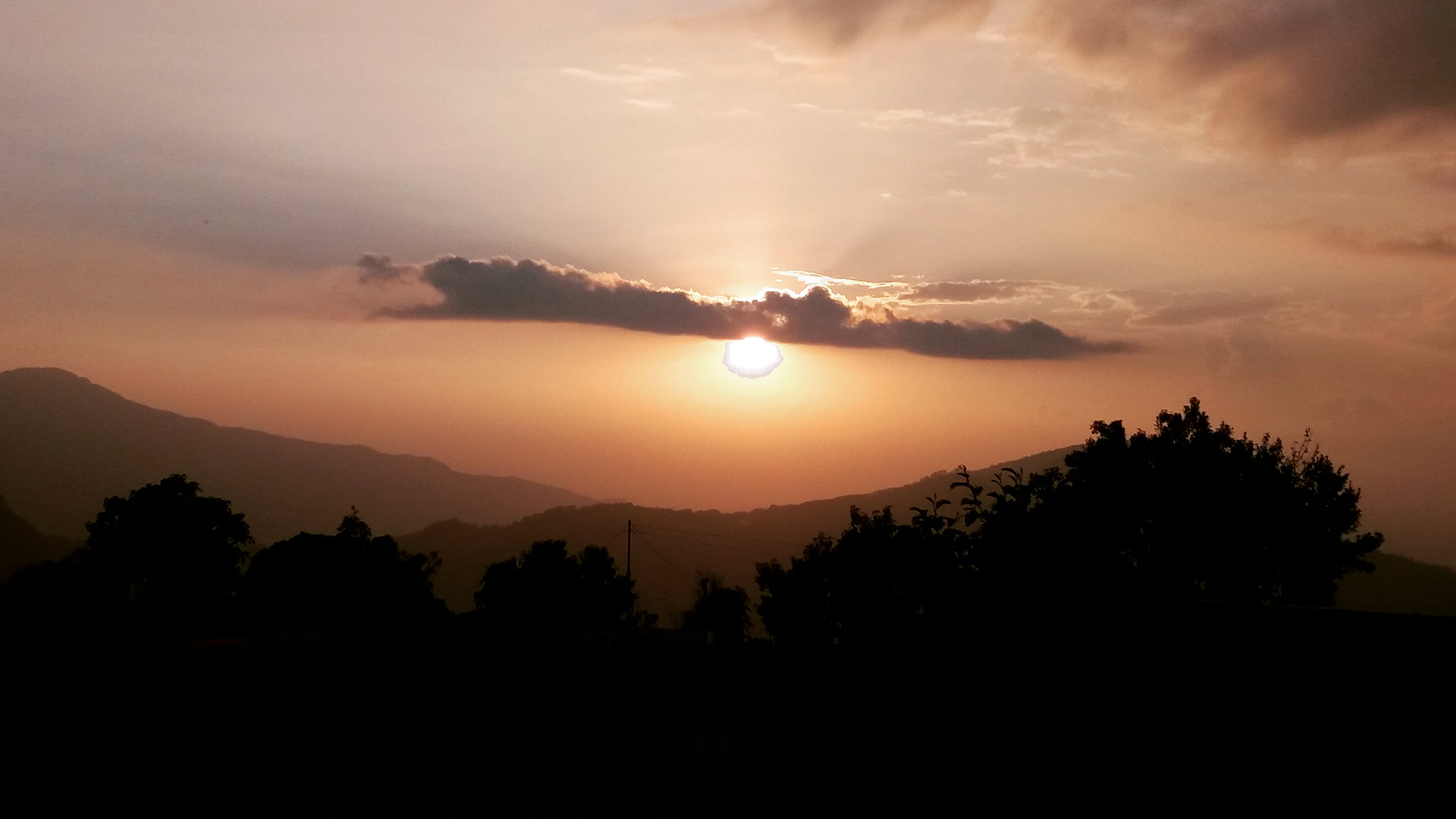
Sunset view from Tauthali (Jabshiley)

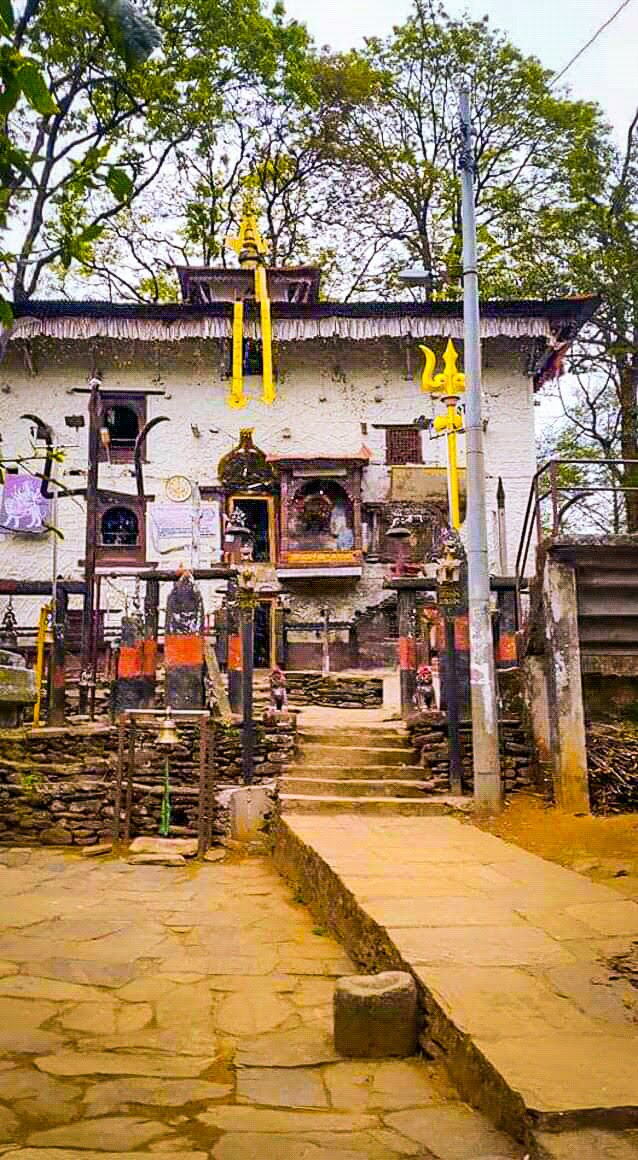
Shree Tripura Sundari Mai before the 2015 earthquake

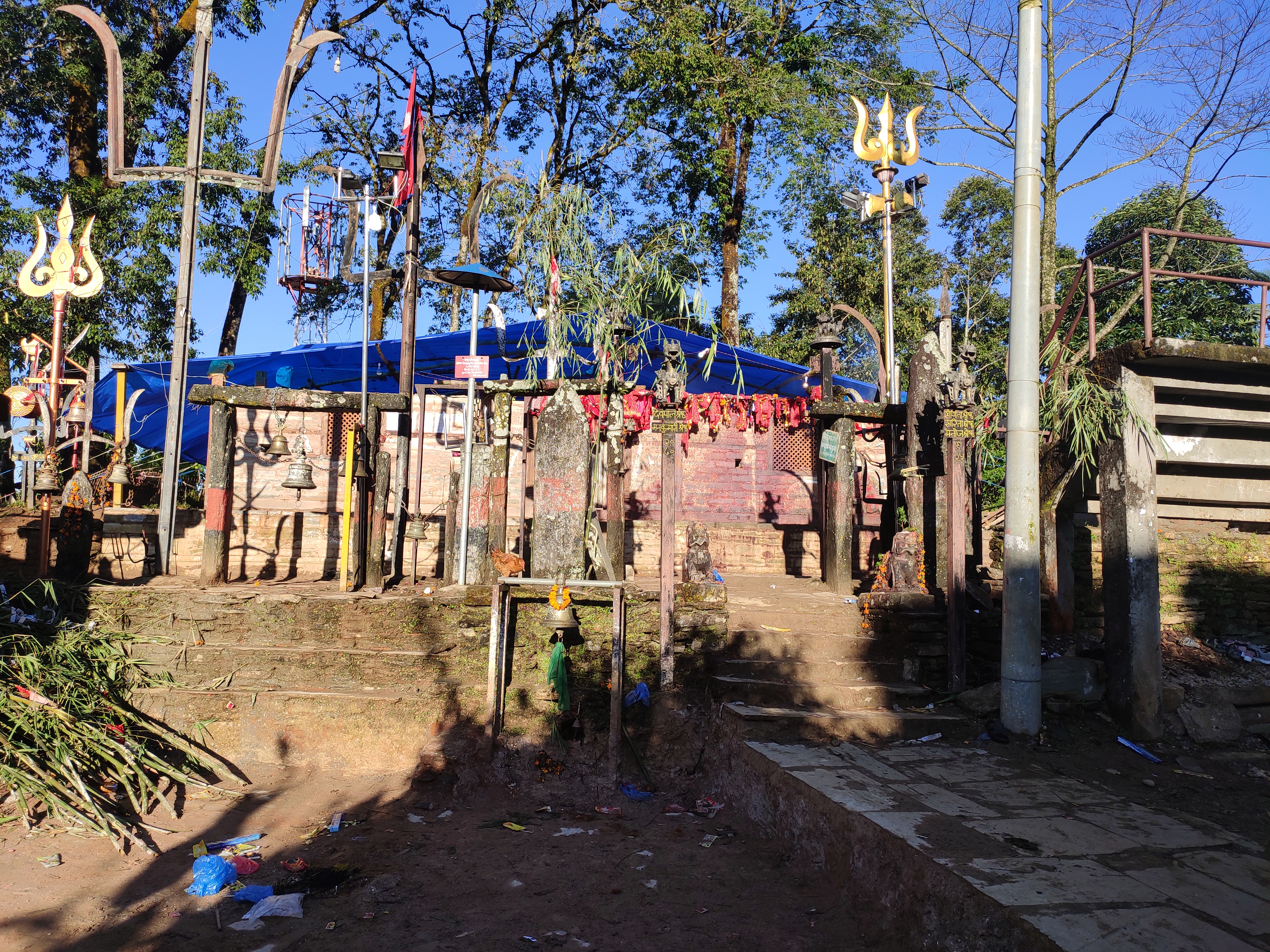
Shree Tripura Sundari Mai (under reconstruction in 2019-20)
