= Land Ports Authority of India =

Government agency of India

- Vasudhaiva Kutumbakam
- Native name: भारतीय भूमि पत्तन प्राधिकरण
- Type: Statutory authority
- Industry: Indian Border Infrastructure
- Predecessor: Department of Border Management, Government of India
- Founded: 1 March 2012
- Headquarters: Lok Nayak Bhawan, Khan Market, New Delhi-110511
- Key people: Aditya Mishra (Chairman)
- Products: Border Management and Border Infrastructure
- Revenue: ₹462.55 crore (US$49.4 million) (2020-21)
- Parent: Ministry of Home Affairs
- Website: lpai.mha.gov.in

The Land Ports Authority of India (Note: Hindi: भारतीय भूमि पत्तन प्राधिकरण Bhāratīya Bhūmi Pattana Prādhikaraṇa) or LPAI is a statutory body (created through the Land Ports Authority of India Act, 2010) working under the Ministry of Home Affairs, Government of India is responsible for creating, upgrading, maintaining and managing border infrastructure in India. It manages several Integrated Check Posts (ICPs) all across Borders of India.

== History ==
LPAI was set up by Land Ports Authority of India Act, 2010 of Parliament of India on 1 March 2012.

== Projects ==
- Integrated Check Posts (ICPs)
- Inland Custom Posts
- Shri Kartarpur Sahib Corridor
