= Nepal Intermodal Transport Development Board =

Nepalese government agency

- नेपाल इन्टरमोडल यातायात विकास समिति

Agency overview
- Formed: 1998
- Jurisdiction: Nepal
- Headquarters: Chobhar, Kirtipur, Kathmandu, Nepal
- Annual budget: NPR
- Minister responsible: Balendra Shah, Prime Minister of Nepal
- Agency executive: Rajeshwor Gyawali, Director General
- Parent agency: Ministry of Industry, Commerce and Supplies, Government of Nepal
- Website: https://nitdb.gov.np/

The Nepal Intermodal Transport Development Board (NITDB) was formed by the government of Nepal in 2054 BS (1997 AD) to oversee the economical and efficient management of Inland Clearance Depots (ICDs) for the facilitation of Nepal's foreign trade. There are three ICDs in Nepal which operate under the NITDB.

- Birgunj Inland Dry Port
- Biratnagar Inland Dry Port
- Bhairahwa Inland Dry Port
- ICP Birgunj Customs Office
