= Udayapur Cement Industry =

Cement manufacturer in Nepal

Udayapur Cement Industries Limited
- Native name: उदयपुर सिमेन्ट उद्योग लिमिटेड
- Company type: Government
- Industry: Cement
- Founded: 14 June 1987
- Headquarters: Udayapur, Nepal
- Products: Gaida Cement
- Website: udayapurcement.org.np

Udayapur Cement Industries Limited (Nepali: उदयपुर सिमेन्ट उद्योग लिमिटेड) is a cement industry run by the Government of Nepal. The factory is located at Jaljale in Udayapur District of Nepal. The industry was established on 14 June 1987. The factory was designed by Onoda Engineering, Japan and constructed by a consortium of Kawasaki Heavy Industries and Tomen Corporation, Japan. It sells its cement under the brand name of "Gaida Cement". The industry, along with Hetauda Cement Industry, is among the few state-owned industries in Nepal that make cumulative profit.

Limestone is locally mined while gypsum required for the cement production is imported.

The plant also has collaboration with Kathmandu University.

== Infrastructure ==
The cement production plant has:

- a 13.8 km long cable ropeway to transport limestone from Sindhali-hill to factory
- limestone feed hoppers
- raw mill to grind limestone
- clinker burning chamber of 1500C
- packing plant
- testing labs

== Production ==
The initial production capacity of the plant was 800 tonnes/day. In 2019, the production capacity was upgraded to 900 tonnes/day.. The plant plans to increase the capacity to 1100 tonnes/day.

The annual mine requirement is about 330,000 MT of limestone, 4,000 MT of iron ore, 57,000 MT of clay (alumina), 10,500 MT of gypsum and 21,00 MT of silica sand, as raw materials. Similarly, about 50,000 MT of coal, 12,000 kL furnace oil is required per year. Water demand is about 1500 m3/day while electricity demand is 8,000 kW.

The mine is expected to last for 200 years. By 2020, the company has managed to extract only 15% of limestone from the mine.

== See also ==
- Herbs Production & Processing Co. Ltd., state owned herb industry of Nepal
