= Micro-Enterprise Development Programme =

- Website: medep.org.np

Micro-Enterprise Development Programme (MEDEP) is non-profit organisation of Nepal to translate the broader vision of the government's Ninth Five-Year Plan, which is to try and address poverty through the development of micro-enterprises among low-income families.

== Objectives ==
- Providing skill and business training and other support, mainly for women and poor and disadvantaged people to set up micro-enterprises;
- Helping establish business support services and representative organisations for micro-entrepreneurs; and
- Working with the government to improve the policy environment.
