= Nepal Bureau of Standards and Metrology =

Nepal Bureau of Standards & Metrology
- नेपाल गुणस्तर तथा नापतौल विभाग

Agency overview
- Headquarters: Kathmandu, Nepal
- Agency executive: Kumari Jyoti Joshi (Bhatta), Director General
- Website: nbsm.gov.np/index.php

Nepal Bureau of Standards & Metrology (NBSM) is a department under the Ministry of Industry, Nepal. The department was established in 1976 based on the Industrial policy (1974) with an aim to regulate and improve the quality of industrial production. The initial name of the department was Nepal Institute of Standards (NIS). In 1981, with the promulgation of the Nepal Standards (Certification Mark) Act 2037 and Rules 2040 were, it was renamed into Nepal Bureau of Standards (NBS). Later, in 1986 the metrology section was added. In 1988 Department of Weights and Measures of Ministry of Finance was also merged with Nepal Bureau of Standards and was restructured into Nepal Bureau of Standards and Metrology.

The Nepal Standard (Certification Mark) Act 2037 formed Nepal Council for Standards (NCS) as the governing body for Quality, Standards, Testing and Metrology (QSTM) activities in Nepal. The NBSM acts as the secretariat to this council.

== Publications ==
NBSM develops national standards and also to formulate concerning acts and rules. The standards are formulated following international practices. Majority of the standards published by NBSM are voluntary standards, however, it could be mandatory to those who apply and comply with the provisions as laid down in Nepal Standards.

It has established national specification for more than 600 industrial items.

== Regional Office ==
Nepal Bureau of Standards and Metrology(NBSM) has eleven regional offices for implementation of Standard Measure and Weight Act 2025 and rules 2027, and Prepackages Rules, 2077.

1. Standard and Metrology Office, Jhapa
2. Standard and Metrology Office, Biratnagar
3. Standard and Metrology Office, Janakpur
4. Standard and Metrology Office, Birgunj
5. Standard and Metrology Office, Kathmandu
6. Standard and Metrology Office, Pokhara
7. Standard and Metrology Office, Butwal
8. Standard and Metrology Office, Nepalgunj
9. Standard and Metrology Office, Birendranagar
10. Standard and Metrology Office, Dhangadhi
11. Standard and Metrology Office, Silgadhi

== Departments ==
NBSM has the following departments:

- Departmental Head
- Certification Department
- Quality control and Laboratory Department
- Scientific Metrology Department

== Noticeable works ==
- In January 2019, the licence of 18 construction material manufacturing companies were suspended for producing substandard goods. These were including Ghirahi Cement Pvt Ltd in Dang, Narayani Micropipe Industry Pvt Ltd in Bara, Nawa Nepal Plastic Industry, Narayani Cement Industry Pvt Ltd in Bara, Mega Cement Pvt Ltd in Jhapa, Laxmi Steels Pvt Ltd in Nawalparasi, Kathmandu Steels Pvt Ltd in Nawalparasi and Ganapati Vanaspati Pvt Ltd in Bara, International Cement Pvt Ltd in Birgunj, Gorakhkali Cement Industries Pvt Ltd in Jhapa, Annapurna Cement Pvt Ltd in Morang, Golden Battery Pvt Ltd in Morang, Sugam Manufacture in Kathmandu, MJP Cement Pvt Ltd in Kapilvastu, Ganapati Cement Pvt Ltd in Kapilvastu, Hongsi Cement Industry in Nawalparasi, Arghakhanchi Cement Industry in Rupandehi and Shubha Shree Jagadamba Cement Industry in Bara.
- In February 2020, 13 cement, iron and steel factories were investigated for cheating consumers by producing and selling substandard products.

== Controversy and corruption ==
- NBSM was blamed for neglecting the standards of the gas plants construction.
