= Herbs Production & Processing Co. Ltd. =

Government run herbal industry in Nepal

- Native name: जडीबुटी उत्पादन तथा प्रशोधन कम्पनी लिमिटेडको
- Type: Public
- Industry: Herbal medicine
- Founded: 1981; 45 years ago
- Headquarters: Koteshwor, Kathmandu, Nepal
- Key people: Dr. Buddi Sagar Poudel (Chairperson), Mrs. Sangita Yadav (General Manager), Mrs. Usha Rijal (Manager), Mr. Dharma Lal Nepal (Information Officer)
- Owner: Government of Nepal
- Website: hppcl.com.np

Herbs Production & Processing Co. Ltd. (abbr. HPPCL)(Nepali: जडिबुटी उत्पादन तथा प्रसोधन कम्पनी)is a Government of Nepal undertaking herbal production company.

== History ==
The company was established in 1981 under the supervision of government of Nepal. It is the first Nepali company to harvest the countries MAPs (medicinal and aromatic plants) and produce medicinal extract and essential oil for the pharmaceutical, food, beauty and wellness industries. Dr. Sindu Prasad Dhungana is the current chairperson of the company.

The headquarter of the company is in Kathmandu. It owns 500 Bighas of land in Bara, 70 hectors in Belbari, 25 hector in Sunsari and 4.5 hector in Kailali districts to grow the medicinal herbs. In Kanchanpur it owns 20 Ropanis land. A branch office was established in Jajarkot (Karnali district) in 2078 BS.

== Products ==
- Sancho: It is one of the main product with annual production totalling to 3.3 million units. It is essentially Zanthoxylum oil made from a blend of various Himalayan essential herb oils and used for curing minor aches and cold. It consists of eucalyptus, kapoor, Tusli, Timoor .
- Balm
- Himalayan massage oil
- Silajit

== See also ==
- Herbal medicine
