= Chobhar Dry Port =

Dry port in Nepal

- Interactive map of Chobhar Dry Port
- Location in Nepal Bagmati Province# Nepal Chobhar Dry Port (Nepal)
- Native name: चोभार सुख्खा बन्दरगाह

Location
- Country: Nepal
- Location: Kirtipur, Bagmati Province, Nepal
- Coordinates: 27.655903010580776°N 85.29098359061426°E

Details
- Type of harbour: Dry port

The Chobhar Dry Port (Nepali: चोभार सुख्खा बन्दरगाह) is a dry port in Kirtipur, Bagmati Province, Nepal.

In January 2019, then prime minister KP Sharma Oli laid the foundation stone for the port. The dry port spans over 11.77 hectares of land and it is estimated that it will cost 1.70 billion Nepalese rupees (NPR). The Chobhar Dry Port is being built on the land that was previously used by Himal Cement Factory.

In August 2021, it was reported that the port was ready to begin its operation. The Chobhar Dry Port was initially met with protests by the locals as they believed that the construction of the port will eventually displace them.

In April 2022, it was reported that the port has begun its business operation.
