= Dryport Birgunj =

Dry port in Nepal

Birgunj Dry Port
- Interactive map of Birgunj Dry Port
- Location in Nepal Madhesh Province# Nepal Birgunj Dry Port (Nepal)
- Native name: वीरगञ्ज सुख्खा बन्दरगाह

Location
- Country: Nepal
- Location: Birgunj, Madhesh Province, Nepal
- Coordinates: 27°01′10″N 84°50′57″E

Details
- Type of harbour: Dry port

Birganj Inland Dry Port (Nepali: बिरगञ्ज आंतरिक सुख्खा बन्दगाह) also known as Birgunj Customs Office is Nepal's first dry port constructed in 2000 AD by Nepal Government. In 2001 AD. ownership of dryport transferred to NITDB. NITDB awarded HTPL the contract to operate and manage the Inland Clearance Depot in Sirsiya, Birganj. The dryport came in operation from 16 July 2004. The dryport covers an area of 38 hectares including customs office, four shed houses, terminal buildings, weighing bridges, two banks, and six lines for the train container yard. 1586 containers can be managed at a time. The dryport is connected by Train owned by Indian Railways which connects the dryport to Raxaul in India.

== Offices in Dryport ==
- Nepal Intermodal Transport Development Board (NITDB)
- Custom Office - Dryport
- Pristine Valley Dryport Pvt Ltd (Port Operator Company)
- Intermodal Logistic
- Custom agent office
- Nepal Police
- Banks
1. Kumari Bank Limited, Dryport Branch
2. Everest Bank Limited, ICD Branch

== See also ==
- Nepal Intermodal Transport Development Board
