= Nepal Oil Corporation =

Nepali state-owned monopoly enterprise for petroleum products

Nepal Oil Corporation Limited
- Native name: नेपाल आयल निगम लिमिटेड
- Type: State-owned
- Industry: Petroleum
- Founded: 10 January 1970
- Founder: Subarna Bikram Thapa
- Headquarters: Babarmahal, Kathmandu, Nepal
- Number of locations: 10 (494)
- Area served: Nepal
- Key people: Narayan Prasad Sharma Duwadee (Chairman); Nagendra Sah (Managing Director)
- Products: Petrol, Diesel, Kerosene, LPG
- Production output: 71674KL
- Owner: Government of Nepal
- Number of employees: 1200+ (2020)
- Website: http://noc.org.np/

Nepal Oil Corporation Limited (NOC) (Nepali: नेपाल आयल निगम लिमिटेड) is a monopoly state owned trading enterprise of Nepal that imports, stores and distributes various petroleum products in the country. In Nepal, no private or other companies are allowed to import Petrol and Diesel other than NOC. It was established on 2027 Poush 26 by the Government of Nepal under the "Company Act, 2021 (1964)". The government owns 99.46% of its share and rest is contributed by four other state owned enterprises: Rastriya Beema Sansthan, National Trading Ltd., Nepal Bank Ltd. and Rastriya Banijya Bank.

== History ==
In the very beginning, the trading activities of NOC were started by storing two products in two drums under the leadership of the late Mr. Subarna Bikram Thapa. His persistent endeavor to develop NOC resulted in more than 30,000 kilolitres (kL) of storage facilities for petroleum products in different development regions of Nepal.

Nepal, being one of the land locked countries of south Asia, has to depend on India for the supply and distribution of various petroleum products as the eastern, southern and western part of the country is attached with India. The prospect of crude oil exploration in Nepal has not yet been proven a feasible one, so the entire national demand is met by import alone. From the very beginning of NOC's trading activities, a special and long-term supply arrangement has existed with Indian Oil Corporation Ltd. (IOC), a leading national oil company of India, having more than 55% of the market share.

NOC, headquartered in Kathmandu, has Seven Provincial offices in every State of Nepal, Three branch offices, two fuel depots, One Petrol Pump, and Ten aviation fuel depots, with total existing storage capacity of 71,558 kilolitres (kL) and employing 872 permanent staffs and other contract work force. The highest policy making and controlling body of NOC is its board of directors. The board is represented by all bureaucrats except one as expert, expert is also appointed by the government of Nepal.

== Motihari-Amlekhgunj Oil Pipeline ==
The Motihari-Amlekhganj pipeline is a 69 kilometres (42.9 mi) long oil pipeline from Motihari, India to Amlekhgunj (Bara district) Nepal. This pipeline is built to make transportation of oil easier, safer and faster to Nepal.It is the first trans-national pipeline in the Indian sub-continent operated by Indian Oil Corporation Limited.

The pipeline was jointly inaugurated by Prime ministers of India and Nepal on 10 September 2019.
