= 1995 Myeong-dong migrant labor protest =

Labor protest in Seoul, South Korea

The 1995 Myeong-dong Migrant Labor Protest occurred in front of the Myeongdong Cathedral in Seoul, South Korea. The nine day sit-in protest by 14 Nepalese migrant workers, which started on New Year's Day and lasted until January 9, was a demonstration against the Industrial Trainee System and the inhumane working conditions that stem from this guest worker program. Several events that led up to the 1995 sit-in includes Jeon Tae-Il's death, as well as rising anti-foreign worker sentiment and activism from the Federation of Korean Trade Unions (FKTU) and the Korean Trade Unions Council (KTUC). The 1995 demonstration is notable for sparking the migrant labor rights movement, including the creation of the Migrant Worker Support Movement (MWSM) and the Joint Committee for Migrant Workers in Korea (JCMK).

== Background ==
=== Industrial Trainee System ===
The Industrial Trainee System (ITS) was implemented in November 1991 to help rebuild the declining manufacturing sector. Under the ITS, small and medium-size companies in the manufacturing, construction, and fishing sectors were able to recruit foreign workers from China, Philippines, Indonesia, and other Southeast Asian countries, under the status of a "trainee" to work in South Korea for a temporary period of time.

As these migrant trainees did not have official working status, they were not protected by labor laws. Employers placed them in dangerous working conditions and trainees faced wage theft.

Many migrant trainees left their designated workplaces, which rendered them as unauthorized workers and placed them at risk of being deported. New employers took advantage of their legal vulnerability by threatening to call immigration if workers complained about their working conditions, perpetuating the cycle of inhumane working environments for undocumented migrant workers. Migrant labor activists described the ITP as a modern-day slavery system in South Korea that denied basic human and labor rights to migrant workers and in 1995, launched a historic protest to demand the end of the exploitative system.

=== Working conditions and discrimination ===
Migrant laborers in South Korea worked under dangerous circumstances. Some reported conditions include working long work days with only three hours of sleep; hourly wages below the minimum set by state labor legislation; chronic wage theft; inadequate job instruction, and high rates of workplace injury and accidents. Reports also revealed that employers restricted workers from leaving their positions, withheld worker immigration documents, called for immigration raids, as well as physically, verbally, and sexually abused workers.

Furthermore, many South Koreans viewed migrant laborers as a threat to their ethnic homogeneity, imposing them to further discrimination.

Overall, migrant workers have been pushed to the lower tier of the labor market. From the beginning, they faced social discrimination through being seen as a population of degenerate foreigners. With their sensitive immigration status’, being placed in inhumane workplace conditions and having minimal protection of their labor rights, they have been consistently taken advantage of.

=== Earlier demonstrations ===
==== Death of Jeon Tae-Il ====
The death of Jeon Tae-Il, a labor rights activist, was referred to as a major influence in the inspiration and organization of the 1995 Protest, as well as the beginnings of the migrant labor rights movement. Jeon Tae-Il was a 22-year old tailor working in the PyeongHwa Clothing Market. On November 13, 1970, he set himself on fire while marching through the market yelling expressions such as “Workers are not machines!” and “Let us rest on Sundays!”. Although he was fighting for the labor rights movement overall, with no specification of migrant labor rights, he became a symbol for labor rights struggle and advocacy under South Korea's strict military dictatorship. This set the scene for the labor rights movement for domestic workers, as well as the inspiration for the origins of the migrant labor rights movement. 25 years after the death of Jeon Tae-Il would be the 1995 Protest.

==== Rising anti-foreign worker sentiment ====
Prior to the 1995 protest, anti-foreign worker sentiment was increasing across big cities that had large companies importing migrant laborers. The Federation of Korean Trade Unions (FKTU) and the Korea Trade Unions Council (KTUC) were at the forefront of this growing conception. They resisted legislation that would open the labor market to migrant workers, with the argument that this strips jobs away from domestic laborers. Thus, as migrant workers were in their beginning stages of outwardly expressing their struggle in the workplace and disagreement with the ITS, the FKTU and KTUC continued to support the ITS.

== Protest ==
=== Event ===
The protest began on New Year's Day in 1995 at the Myeongdong Cathedral, lasting a total of 9 days, in opposition against the Industrial Trainee System for systematically producing a population of vulnerable, bottom-tier migrant workers in the labor market. This sit-in protest was demonstrated by 13 Nepalese migrant workers previously contracted under the Industrial Trainee System. They publicized how they arrived in South Korea as trainees to escape poverty after finding that there were no available jobs in their home countries. However, during their employment period, their employers had withheld their wages for over six months, with the reasoning that they would send the money directly back to the trainees’ families on their behalf, which was false. Furthermore, workers were consistently abused and beaten when demanding to receive their wages directly. After this conflict gained traction, and the increase of migrant workers expressing their struggles and concerns internally within their community, these demonstrators organized this protest.

During the nine days of the protest, the demonstrators shackled their necks with iron chains, exposing their struggles as a migrant laborer, paralleling the image of a slave. Their signs and slogans said “Do not beat us. We are humans too, we are not slaves.” Other grassroots organizations, mostly religious, were also recorded to have protested along in solidarity of the migrant worker community.

=== Response from state ===
After the 1995 protest, the state acknowledged the systematic issues stemming from the Industrial Trainee System. They changed the Labor Standards Law to include migrant workers and industrial trainees contracted by the ITS in legislation regarding industrial accidents, medical insurances, and minimum wage arrangements.

Although the Protest is viewed as successful due to this relatively quick government response, it still did not address the issues of toxic and inhumane working conditions and the production cycle of unauthorized workers. This realization eventually led to the creation of the Migrant Workers’ Support Movement (MWSM) and Joint Committee for Migrant Workers in Korea (JCMK).

== Aftermath and significance ==
The 1995 Protest is memorable for being the first major protest supporting the migrant worker community, front lining their struggles. Furthermore, the location of the protest, at the Myeongdong Cathedral, is notable for being a stage for advocacy against the military dictatorship. The protest is also particularly significant for sparking the migrant worker rights activism after the demonstration. For example, it was recorded that Filipino migrant workers began utilizing Catholic churches as a community meeting spot to discuss abuse issues, leading to the support of domestic Catholic grassroots groups such as the Catholic Young Workers’ Group.

The two major organizations created from the impact of the protest were the Migrant Workers Support Movement (MWSM) and the Joint Committee for Migrant Workers in Korea (JCMK).

=== Migrant Workers Support Movement (MWSM) ===
The Migrant Workers Support Movement (MSWM) was an organization of religious groups, non-governmental organizations, and individuals in the migrant worker community that advocated for revised employer management styles and more lenient policies for foreign laborers. They organized more protests and focused on increasing awareness of migrant labor rights issues.

The MSWM is especially significant for being the first organization to push for the independent unionization of migrant laborers. Individuals from the migrant worker community were active in this organization, self-advocating for the formation of a union for their own.

=== Joint Committee for Migrant Workers in Korea (JCMK) ===
The Joint Committee for Migrant Workers in Korea (JCMK) stemmed from the MSWM, created as one of its sub-organizations, to not only continue advocating for migrant labor rights but to also administer different types of services for the migrant labor community. Some of these services include cultural assimilation training, settlement counseling, and navigating medical care. They also planned various protests and demonstrations to demand migrant labor legislation reform.

The JCMK organized a number of campaigns and rallies to pressure the government to reform immigration labor policy while providing various services, such as cultural assimilation training, settlement counseling, and medical care, to foreign workers.

== See also ==
- Immigration to South Korea
- Foreign Worker Legislation in South Korea
- Human Rights in South Korea
- Trade Unions in South Korea
