= City Express Money Transfer =

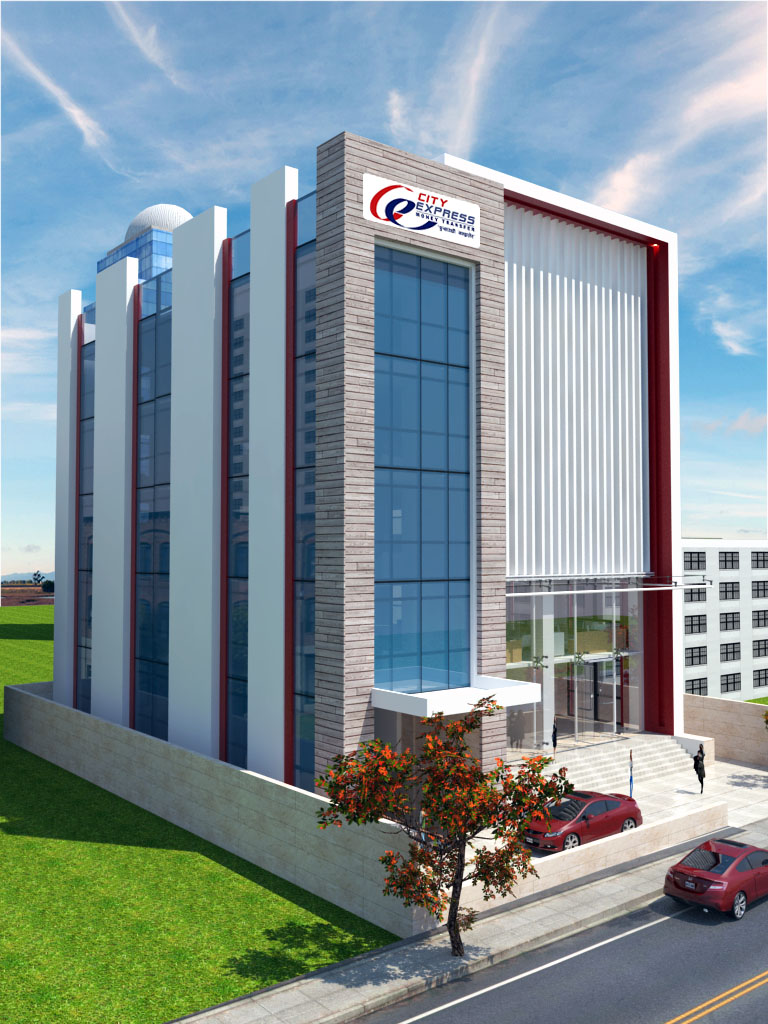
- City Express Building at Kathmandu, Nepal
- Native name: सिटी एक्सप्रेस मनि ट्रान्सफर
- Type: Private
- Industry: Financial services
- Founded: 11 July 2007; 19 years ago
- Headquarters: Kathmandu, Nepal
- Area served: Worldwide
- Key people: Chandra Tandan (Managing Director)
- Services: Money transfer, Remittance
- Website: www.ctxpress.com

City Express Money Transfer is a Nepal-based remittance service founded in July 2007. It is the promoter of CityPay (City Wallet Pvt. Ltd.), a licensed digital wallet in Nepal that allows instant remittance payouts directly into the wallet. The company's headquarters are located in Kathmandu, Nepal. It has been licensed by the Central Bank of Nepal, Nepal Rastra Bank to operate money transfer service in Nepal. There are more than 7000 City Express authorized payout locations all over Nepal. Branches of City Express are also located in areas such as the Middle East, Malaysia, Korea, Japan, Australia, US and UK. The company is a member of the Nepal Remitters Association. It is also one of six institutions permitted to accept payment of Nepal Electricity Authority bills. An important factor in reducing poverty, remittance income was almost equal to the Nepal national budget in 2014. Malaysia, the US and the Gulf region are the top locations for Nepali workers abroad who remit earnings home.

== See also ==
- Remittances to Nepal
- CityPay (digital wallet promoted by the company)
