= Labour migration from Nepal =

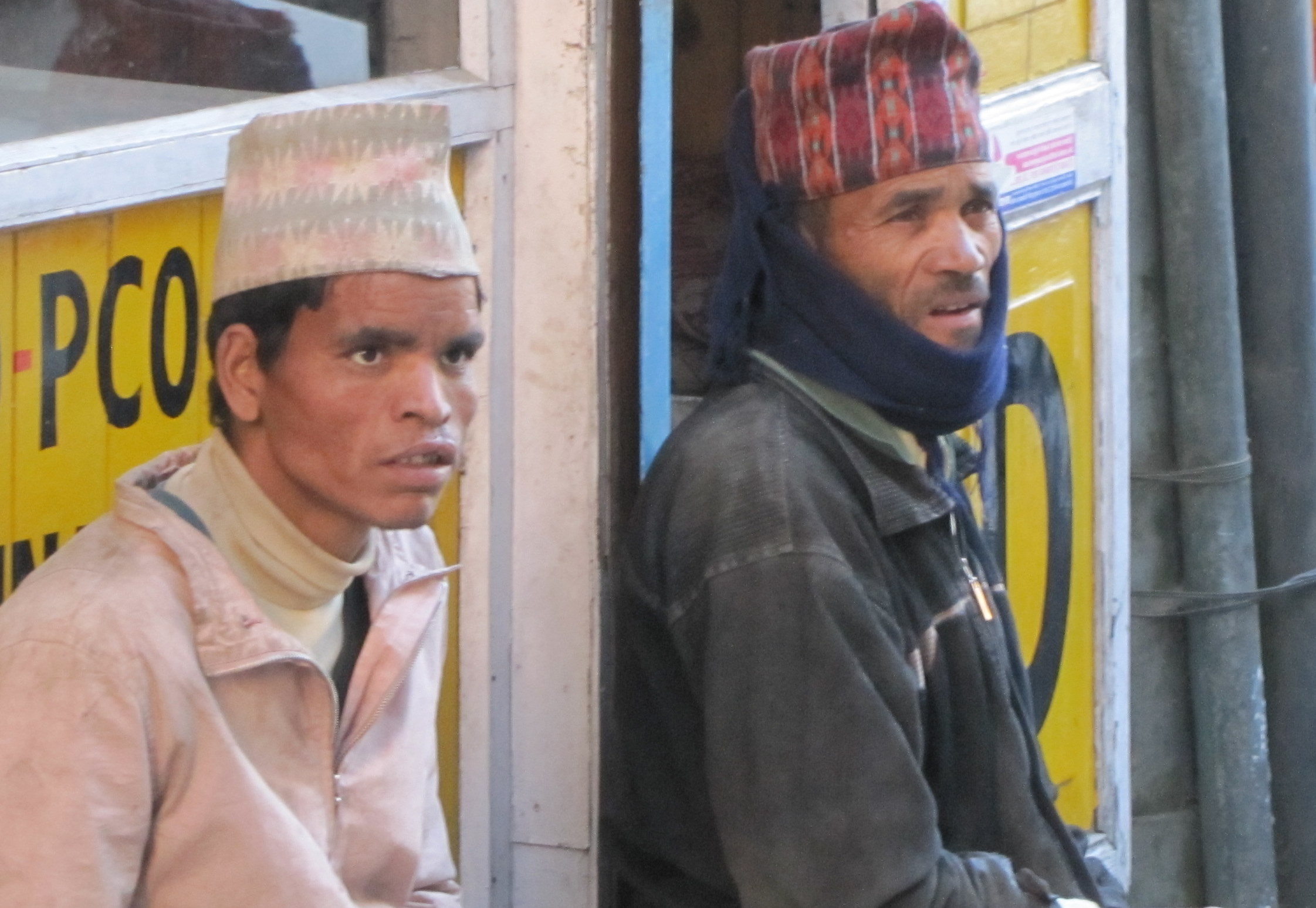
Nepali Coolies (porters) in Landour Dehradun India

Many Nepalis migrate to foreign countries in search of employment and better income opportunities. Labour migration has been a key livelihood strategy of many Nepalese families, aiming to improve income and living standards and to secure a better future. Labour migration has become a major source of remittances to Nepal.

== History and terminology ==
Foreign employment of Nepalis started in medieval time with the great sculptor Arniko, who moved to China with 80 sculptors and masons in 1260 AD. During the Mughal rule in India, a handful of Nepalese people had been to Delhi and other cities. The expression Muglāne, (Nepali: मुग्लाने) appeared in the early 18th century and was initially used to denote migrant workers; it literally means "person employed in the country of Mughals". Later, the term referred to the numerous Nepalese economic migrants working from the late Mughal until the early British rule in India After the Gorkhas' defeat in the Anglo-Nepalese War, some Gorkha soldiers led by Balbhadra Singh Kunwar fled to Lahore and joined the army there. Following this, many Nepalese joined the armies of various states of medieval India. In British India the term Lāhure (Nepali: लाहुरे), was coined, literally meaning "army working in Lahore". It is also said that some Nepalese youths fought in the Nepali-British war (1871–1872) and later reached Lahore. They joined the army of King Ranjit Singh of Punjab. That is why the term Lahure is associated with Lahore. During that time, a huge number of Nepalese laborers worked in road construction, tea plantations, coal mining, porterage, etc. in various cities of India. Later, any type of Nepalese migrant worker working in British India was called Lahure. The term 'Lahure' is still in use and is a respectful term, especially used to address Gurkhas serving in foreign armed forces. The terms 'labour migrants' is used for any type of foreign employee in modern days.

== Major destinations and professions ==
The army and security services have historically attracted Nepalese people as sources of foreign employment. The formal labour migration in Nepal started at the beginning of the 19th century after the Anglo-Nepalese War 1814-1816. After Gurkha soldiers demonstrated gallantry during World War I and World War II, young Nepalis were greatly in demand, and were recruited into the British armed forces as the British-Gurkha regiment, followed by the Indian Army, the Brunei Army and the Singapore Police. Demand for Nepalese guards encourages many youths to join private security services abroad. After the 1950 Indo-Nepal Treaty people of Nepal and India could travel freely, which gave the opportunity for Nepalese youth to move to India for work in different sectors like tea gardens, restaurants, factories, etc.

In modern days, the field of work has been diversified, and Nepalese migrant workers are employed in various sectors across the globe, ranging from security to sales and marketing, heavy equipment handling to software engineering, and data science to biotechnologies.

Middle East countries such as Qatar, United Arab Emirates, Saudi Arabia, and Oman are the main attractions for low- and semi-skilled manpower. Similarly, South Korea, and Malaysia are also good destinations. Australia, Canada, USA and European countries are also attracting a significant semi-skilled and high-skilled manpower.

== Statistics ==
The absent population numbers 2.19 million according to the 2021 census. The statistics show that 7.5% of the total population is resident outside the country. The report says 73.29% of the absent population is in the 15-44 age group. Migration from Nepal includes labour migration, student migration, long-term and seasonal migration. The Nepal government has issued institutional permits to 111 countries, but there are also some countries that are banned by the government; nevertheless people work in countries like Afghanistan, Iraq, and Libya. The number of foreign labour permits issued showed a steady increase from 2008-09 until 2014-15, but the number dropped due to the devastating earthquake. Between 2008-09 and 2016-17, the Department of Foreign Employment issued 3.5 million foreign employment permits (around 14% of Nepal's total population). On average, 95.2% of the permits were issued to males, and 4.7% to females (Thapa & Ghimire, 2018). Most migrants fall into the 26-35 age group (47.5%) and the 36-45 age group (25.9%).

Malaysia has been the top destination for Nepalese migrant workers since 2008; 4.23% of total labour permits issued in 2018-19 were for Malaysia. This is also the top destination for female labour migration from Nepal.

== Contribution to the national economy ==
Foreign employment is one of the major sources of income of Nepali families, but this not only helps the family members but also plays a vital role in the national economy. In 2023, Nepal received around USD 11 billion in remittances, which is 26% of the country's GDP. In 2018, Nepal became the 8th highest remittance-receiving country in the world and the first within South Asian countries based on its contribution to GDP.

Besides its contribution to the economy, it has contributed to Nepal through importing skills migrant learned in the host countries. Those skills migrant have used own country upon return.

== Nepalese Women in labor migration ==
Like overall international labor migration, women's migration overseas is also on the rise. In just two decades, women's labor migration increased fivefold, from 82172 in 2001 to 406,163 in 2001. Although work is the main reason behind their migration, many also migrate as dependents of their husband. For women to migrate as laborers, they need to get a permit from the Department of Foreign Employment, but until now no laborers going from Nepal to India should take a labor permit. The majority of Nepalese women migrate to Malaysia or Gulf countries (GCC countries and most of them are engaged in domestic work. Nearly 69,000 Nepalese women are employed in Kuwait as domestic workers despite the Nepal government's ban on sending Nepalese women in that sector. There are many cases of abuse and violence that are faced by Nepalese women during migration. Poor living conditions, work-related harassment, lack of free movement, long working hour, sexual harrsement, etc are few of problems that is reported often.

There are also studies that shows that, labor migration has also contributed to women empowerment. The regular income and their contribution to family members have make them empowered because they can contribute to major household decisions, which was not the case before labor migration.

== Cultural transformation ==
Nepal was kept in isolation by the Rana rulers, limiting the mobility of the general citizens; therefore, people were living solo lifestyles limited to their ancestral professions. Nepalese migrant workers have made a significant contribution to the cultural transformation abroad and social change in the nation. When European society had reached the peak of industrial development, its influence had already begun to spread to British-ruled India. Railway tracks had been laid across the plains of the Ganges, marking the spread of modernity. Nepal was in such a context that Nepali society couldn't remain untouched by these global transformations. Gurkha fighters were the first Nepalese people who have exposure to the outer world. The strongest agents who carried these waves of change to Nepalese villages were the Lahures, Nepali youths who went abroad for military service.

Young men from Nepal's hill villages who worked for the Gorkha regiments returned back as Lahures, carrying new lifestyles, clothing styles and those manners gradually entered rural Nepal. During the First World War, Nepali youths reached as far as Europe to fight. Those who returned after enduring countless hardships brought back the customs, habits, diets, and ways of life they had seen and experienced abroad, introducing a new wave of transformation into Nepali society

== Challenges and support mechanism ==
While labor migration offers many benefits to both individuals and the nation, it also poses many challenges. Exploitation of labor, low pay, and risky jobs are among the challenges, but migrant workers, due to a lack of access and knowledge, are forced to stay submissive to such abuses and violations. One report shows that Nepalese migrant workers are dying at a rate of one in two days in Gulf countries, mainly those who work in the construction sector. The more heartbreak report is, at least one death body arrives from the Gulf or the UAE to Nepal. This clearly shows the poor working condition and lack of healthcare for the Nepalese migrant workers.

However, there are a lot of challenges, there are government entities and national internal agencies to support the migrant workers. International organizations, governmental agencies, and social institutions are actively engaged in addressing various dimensions of migration, including policy development, migrant protection, and reintegration support. The International Organization for Migration (IOM) collaborates with the Government of Nepal to ensure effective migration management, focusing on areas such as migration health, migrant assistance and protection, labor mobility, and the interconnection between migration, environment, and climate change. Similarly, the International Labour Organization (ILO) works to safeguard the rights of vulnerable migrant workers, enhance the developmental benefits of labor migration, and curb irregular migration. Helvetas Swiss Intercooperation Nepal, through its Safer Migration (SaMi) Project, promotes safe migration practices by offering counseling, skills training, literacy programs, and psychosocial support for returnee migrants. In addition, United Nations agencies like UNDP and UN Women are actively involved in protecting migrant workers' rights, improving labor migration governance, and promoting gender-responsive migration policies.

On the national level, the Ministry of Labour, Employment and Social Security (MoLESS) plays a central role in migration governance by formulating policies, implementing related projects, and leading the Foreign Employment Promotion Board (FEPB). The FEPB and the Department of Foreign Employment (DoFE) oversee the regulation and administration of foreign employment, including information dissemination, pre-departure orientation, and the management of the migrant welfare fund. The Nepal Association of Foreign Employment Agencies (NAFEA), representing recruitment agencies, has created significant employment opportunities abroad, though it often faces criticism for cases of worker exploitation. Civil society organizations also play vital roles—Centre for Mental Health and Counseling-Nepal (CMC-Nepal) develops counseling modules and supports family reunification of returnee migrants, while trade unions like General Federation of Nepalese Trade Unions (GEFONT) and Nepal Trade Union Congress (NTUC), along with NGOs such as Shakti Samuha, Maiti Nepal, and Child Workers in Nepal (CWIN)-Nepal, work against human trafficking through rescue, rehabilitation, shelter, legal aid, and vocational training initiatives.

There are also some national Acts like the Human Trafficking and Transportation Control Act 2007 (HTTCA) and the Foreign Employment Act 2007 and 2008 (FEA) to protect migrant workers from exploitation. HTTCA Act says that if a person commits human trafficking, they will be jailed up to 20 years.

== See also ==
- Nepalese diaspora
