= Migrant Housing Act of North Carolina =

Law that governs migrant workers' housing in North Carolina, United States

The Migrant Housing Act (MHA) of North Carolina (S.B. 631; North Carolina General Statutes 95-222:229) was made into law in the U.S. state of North Carolina in 1989. It governs migrant workers housing through regulations of housing inspections, standards to be met, and recognition of housing that meets all standards and requirements after the pre-occupancy inspection is done by the North Carolina Department of Labor (NCDOL) and the local county health department. Its goal is to ensure safe and healthy migrant housing conditions.

== Background ==
Migrant workers can be defined as people who come from their home country to the United States legally, typically with limited benefits, to work in a variety of industries such as furniture, agriculture, and construction. An H-2A visa allows a foreign national entry into the U.S. for temporary or seasonal agricultural work. Typically, migrant workers make low wages, have limited access to healthcare and other medical facilities, and work for extremely long periods of time in extreme and often hazardous conditions. North Carolina is a state that thrives off of farmworker labor as it is home to Christmas tree farms, tomato farms, poultry factories, and tobacco fields.

In 1983, the United States Department of Labor passed the Migrant and Seasonal Agricultural Workers Protection Act that regulated many aspects of migrant workers housing and working conditions. Section 203, "Safety and Health of Housing," focused on the properties and their conditions that migrant workers lived on. The Migrant Housing Act of North Carolina (S.B. 631) was ratified in 1989 and implemented in 1990, and established certain requirements for employers who employed and housed migrant workers, such as required housing inspections and standards. Since then, the N.C. Department of Labor has conducted an annual housing registration, inspection and compliance program. The Act also requires that if a grower/owner provides housing to one or more migrant workers on a seasonal basis, then they are covered by the act except for housing in commercial lodging, such as a motel, or if the housing is owner-occupied. The NCDOL Agricultural Safety and Health Bureau conducts pre-occupancy inspections of migrant housing. Housing must meet occupational safety and health standards and specific standards for heat, fire protection and kitchen sanitation. Migrant housing should be registered at least 45 days prior to occupancy. Housing that does not meet the standards can result in fines and abatement requirements for the owners.

== Policy process and enacting legislation ==
The policy formulation officially began in 1986 when advocates of stricter regulations began raising their voices and concerns about the impact of housing standards on migrant workers.

=== House of Representatives bill ===
S.B. 631 was introduced to the North Carolina House of Representatives for the first time on April 21, 1989 as, "An act to consolidate the regulation of migrant housing within the Department of Labor and to establish standards and enforcement provisions for the regulation of migrant housing." The bill was referred to the Committee on Commerce. On May 8, S.B. 631 was enrolled and duly ratified, and then sent to the office of the Secretary of State/North Carolina General Assembly. The bill at this point was also being referred to as "Chapter 91".

=== Senate bill ===
On March 23, S.B. 631 was addressed in North Carolina Senate and referred to Agriculture Committee and re-referred to Manufacturing and Labor Committee and Appropriations Committee. Senator Speed sponsored S.B. 631 in Senate. April 17 marked the date of the completion of the N.C. General Assembly Legislative Fiscal Note, written and prepared by Legislator Carol Shaw and sponsored by Senator Speed. The fiscal note provided great detail to the fiscal responsibilities of the S.B. 631, especially the reorganization of the added employees within the Department of Labor to assist in migrant inspections. On May 8, Senate enrolled S.B. 631 and it was duly ratified and sent to the office of the Secretary of State.

In addition to the Migrant Housing Act of North Carolina, the NCDOL Agricultural Safety and Health Bureau enforces the Occupational Safety and Health Standards for Agriculture, 29 CFR 1928. The N.C. General Assembly amended the Migrant Housing Act in 2007 to require owners and operators of migrant housing to provide migrant workers a bed with "a mattress in good repair with a clean cover" and to add additional regulatory and reporting requirements for the Department of Labor.

Funding the legislation also sparked debate due to the nature of the work and the large territory that must be accounted for. When S.B. 631 was passed, $278,638 was appropriated for the remainder of fiscal year 1989-1990, and then $493,154 was appropriated for fiscal year 1990-1991. This budget included salaries for director, secretary, clerk, field supervisor, and 10 migrant inspectors, as well as benefits and other costs that come with operating a business or organization

== About the law ==
People who provide housing to one or more migrants employed in agriculture on a seasonal basis are covered by the Migrant Housing Act of North Carolina. People who own housing used by migrants (whether their employees or not) or who make arrangements to use someone else's property to house migrant employees must make sure that the housing meets the standards and that the N.C. Department of Labor is notified prior to the migrants moving in.

The law excludes from coverage commercial lodging, such as motels open to the general public, and owner-occupied homes. The law covers any other housing in which migrants live—even if that housing is occupied year-round by other farmworkers. The law extends to migrants working in crab processing facilities and migrants cultivating and harvesting Christmas trees.

People covered under the act must register the housing with the N.C. Department of Labor's Agricultural Safety and Health Bureau 45 days before the migrants' arrival date. The Agricultural Safety and Health Bureau will do a preoccupancy inspection of the housing. Water and sewage inspections have to be done by the county health department before the Agricultural Safety and Health Bureau will do its preoccupancy inspection. If the housing meets all of the requirements, the NCDOL inspector will issue a certificate allowing the housing to be used. If the housing does not meet all of the requirements, the inspector will note what must be fixed. The inspector may have to return to do another inspection before migrants are allowed to move in.

In 2009, the Agricultural Safety and Health Bureau completed 1,367 preoccupancy housing inspections of migrant farmworker housing and 68 compliance inspections. Certificates were issued to 1,285 sites with total occupancy (beds) of 14,442. There were 799 sites in 100 percent compliance at time of inspection.

Gold Star Growers

The Gold Star Grower program recognizes growers who house or are responsible for housing migrant workers that meet all of the requirements stated in the Migrant Housing Act of N.C. at the time of inspection from the DOL and the county's health department. If this process is done two years in a row, the Gold Star Grower could be nominated to display a Gold Star Grower's flag at the housing site. The flag is considered an award from the DOL and shows the grower is committed to safe, well-maintained housing for his/her workers. This nomination process all includes site visits during occupancy, interviews (with grower and/or tenants), and pesticide training for grower and workers.

== Standards to be ensured compliant before occupancy ==
The following standards must be met before occupancy can occur. These standards will be inspected by the NCDOL and the county's health department, and could be inspected by the federal Wage & Hour Division, if necessary.

For complete listing of each specific standard, please visit Migrant Housing Standards, see page 2 of document.

Housing Site:

1) Must be well-drained and not within 200 feet (61 m) of standing water unless treated for mosquitoes.

2) Cooking and sleeping areas must be at least 500 feet (150 m) away from any livestock unless it's deemed safe or if it's a hen house.

3) Space must be kept clean during occupancy and must be cleaned after occupants move out.

Structures:

1) The structure must protect tenants from the weather and must have no holes in the flooring, walls, or ceiling.

2) Ceilings must be at least 7 feet (2.1 m) high unless there is permission on previously manufactured home with smaller than 7-foot (2.1 m) high ceilings.

3) Bedroom must be at least 50 square feet per occupant. If occupants cook, live, and sleep in same space, then 100 square feet (9.3 m^{2}) must be provided, per occupant.

4) Floors must be made of wood, concrete, or asphalt. If made of wood, it must be smooth and tight, and must be elevated at least 1-foot (0.30 m) above the ground.

5) Window space equals 1/10 of floor space. Half of each window must be able to be opened for ventilation purposes. Screens must be on all doors and windows.

6) One ceiling light fixture and one electrical outlet must be in each room.

7) Smoke detectors must be provided in each building where workers sleep and that is larger than 900 sf.

8) All multistory buildings must have a staircase, as well as a fire extinguisher.

9) Each worker must be provided with a mattress and cover that is in good repair, as well as a bed, cot, or bunk. Storage facilities must also accompany every room where workers sleep.

Kitchen:

1) Each kitchen must be kept clean.

2) Each kitchen must have a stove with at least one burner per 5 people with at least 2 burners, a refrigerator, a table, and a sink that puts out hot and cold running water.

3) Must have food storage facilities that can be and must be kept clean.

Toilets:

1) 1 toilet per 15 people of the same sex.

2) 1 urinal per 25 men.

3) Toilet rooms must be at least 100 feet (30 m) away from any sleeping quarters, but within 200 feet (61 m) of sleeping quarters.

4) Must be able to be ventilated, and workers must not have to cut through another's sleeping quarters to get to the bathroom.

5) Toilets must be marked "men" and "women" in English and in native language of the workers.

6) Bathrooms must be lighted, stocked with toiler paper, and kept clean daily.

Laundry and Bathing:

1) Hot and cold water must be available at camp.

2) Shower rooms must be able to reach 70 degrees during cold temperatures.

3) Floors and walls must be smooth and have drainage systems.

4) 1 showerhead per 10 people; 1 handwash basin per 6 people; 1 laundry tub per 30 people.

5) For clothes-drying purposes: either a clothing line or machine must be provided.

6) All buildings must be kept clean.

Heating:

1) If the temperature outside falls below 50 degrees, inside heating must be adequate to 65-70 degrees.

Water and Sewer:

1) Drinking water and sewage systems must be approved and checked by the local health department.

2) OSHA regulates 35 gallons per person, per day. Water outlet must be within 100 feet (30 m) of camp and one water fountain per 100 workers.

Garbage:

1) Grounds and camp must be kept clean and free of garbage and debris.

2) Tight garbage containers must be provided and must be within 100 feet (30 m) of camp.

3) Containers must be kept clean and emptied when full.

Pets:

1) The camp must be free from rodents and insects.

Health:

1) A first-aid kit must be on-site and someone trained in first-day must be available.

2) If any worker has a communicable disease, they must go to the local health department.

General duty:

The law requires migrant housing operators to provide housing "free from recognized hazards that are causing or are likely to cause death or serious injury or serious physical harm." See N.C. Gen. Stat. § 95-129(1).

== Findings ==
According to the Center for Worker Health at Wake Forest University School of Medicine, 27 camps (non-H2A resident camps) were inspected in 2008. All 27 camps had at least one NCDOL housing violation; 41% had 6-10 violations, 18% had 11-16 violations, and 26% had 3-5 violations. The most common violations include no resident trained in First Aid and trash cans were missing a lid. Other major violations that occurred frequently include insufficient space in bedrooms, insufficient laundry facilities, and rodent infestation. The Center for Worker Health states that possible explanations for these violations include that the housing exceeds capacity for which it was certified by the NCDOL, employers fail to properly maintain the camps post-inspection, and that inspections are prioritized for H2A-residential camps. Recommendations by the Center for Worker Health include increased number of inspectors and post-occupancy inspections, as well as expand efforts to identify and inspect unregistered camps.

== The debate of the law ==
- Anonymous reporting of noncompliance from advocates, health department inspectors, workers, and other growers in compliance still not being followed up on
- Number of inspectors still low
- Adequate laundry facilities still neglected to be included in law. Many workers work with pesticides, which has proven to be harmful to their health and well-being
- Poor migrant housing conditions lead to increased prevalence of lead poisoning, respiratory illness, ear infections, and diarrhea

== Amending S.B. 631 ==
Farmworker advocates encouraged the North Carolina General Assembly to adopt changes to the Migrant Housing Act of North Carolina in 2007. Among the changes included adding a requirement that housing providers furnish a bed with a mattress and a mattress cover. Other recommendations included: requiring 1 telephone per camp, 1 washer and dryer per 30 workers, 1 showerhead per 5 workers, 1 toilet per 10 people & 1 urinal per 15 men, the right to visitors, compliance language referencing both growers and crewleaders in the law, and regulatory post-occupancy inspections for camps who have not met regulations during pre-occupancy inspections.

In 2006, Farmworker Advocacy Network (FAN's website) urged politicians to introduce a bill that would require growers to provide a mattress and cover, in good repair, to all workers, as well as increase regulations to be enforced by the NCDOL and inspectors. Senator Alberton introduced SB 1466 and Representative Alexander introduced HB 1501 and HB 1502 in 2006. Specifically, the new law reads, "Each migrant shall be provided with a bed that shall include a mattress in good repair with a clean cover." According to NCDOL's commissioner, Cherie K. Berry the written nature of the new law has created confusion as to what a "mattress" and "cover" is, therefore specifics have been outlined for growers to use as a guide when determining what constitutes as a mattress.

Another change to the law requires the inspectors to provide operators with a copy of a guide for employers on compliance with the Immigration and Nationality Act published by the U.S. Department of Justice.

The NCDOL has also expressed three recommendations that they are working on to improve housing conditions for migrant workers. Their three goals are to: scout each season for unregistered camps, issue citations and penalties for nonregistered camps for noncompliance, and lastly, to ensure that crew leaders are educated on housing standards and that they are complying with the law.
