= Signal International =

Defunct marine construction company

Signal International, LLC is a Mobile, Alabama based marine construction firm specializing in the construction of large oceangoing structures such as offshore drilling rigs, production platforms and barges. The company also has operations in Pascagoula, Mississippi, and Orange, Texas. The company filed for bankruptcy on July 12, 2015, following settlements on lawsuits alleging human trafficking and violating H2B visa conditions for migrant workers.

== Corporate ==
The company was formed after the acquisition of Friede Goldman Halter in 2002. In 2010 the company acquired Bender Shipbuilding and Repair in Mobile, Alabama. The purchase came after Bender filed for bankruptcy. The cost was $31.2 million. Dick Marler is the president and CEO. In 2005 the company hired over 300 workers for a single project to create a floating hotel to serve offshore workers. In 2014 Signal was awarded a $4.5 million government contract to repair and refurbish a navy product tanker. The firm employed an additional 150 workers for that contract.

== Human Trafficking Controversy ==
In 2008 the company was sued in United States federal court on allegations related to human trafficking and infringement of visa policies for migrant workers. Allegations centered on 12 guest workers (among 500) who claimed that Signal forced them to live in squalid living conditions. Approximately 500 skilled Indian nationals were promised a decent living in worker's quarters only to later find they were being housed in an overcrowded setup where up to 24 men shared a space the size of a double-wide trailer. The workers were hired to rebuild infrastructure damaged after Hurricane Katrina. The "camps", in Orange, Texas, were guarded at all times and workers were subject to inspection upon entry and exit. Signal International also deducted $1050 per month from employee paychecks to pay for "rent". In their testimony, affected migrant employees detailed further infringements such as regular searches in the camps, no alcohol or visitor policies, and guards addressing workers by numbers. Signal saved an estimated $8 million in labor costs as a result of this scheme.

In May 2013 suits were filed by 83 other workers with similar claims. In August 2013 the Southern Poverty Law Center filed additional suits representing 500 more workers. In February 2015, a federal court jury awarded $14.1 million in damages to 5 workers arising from the original suit. Following the lawsuits, Signal international filed for Chapter 11 bankruptcy protection on July 12, 2015. At the time of claiming bankruptcy, Signal had 11 similar lawsuits involving 227 other migrant workers from India under similar circumstances. Another $20 million was settled by the company to trafficked workers in early July 2015 just before filing bankruptcy.
