= Migrant worker =

Person who migrates to pursue work

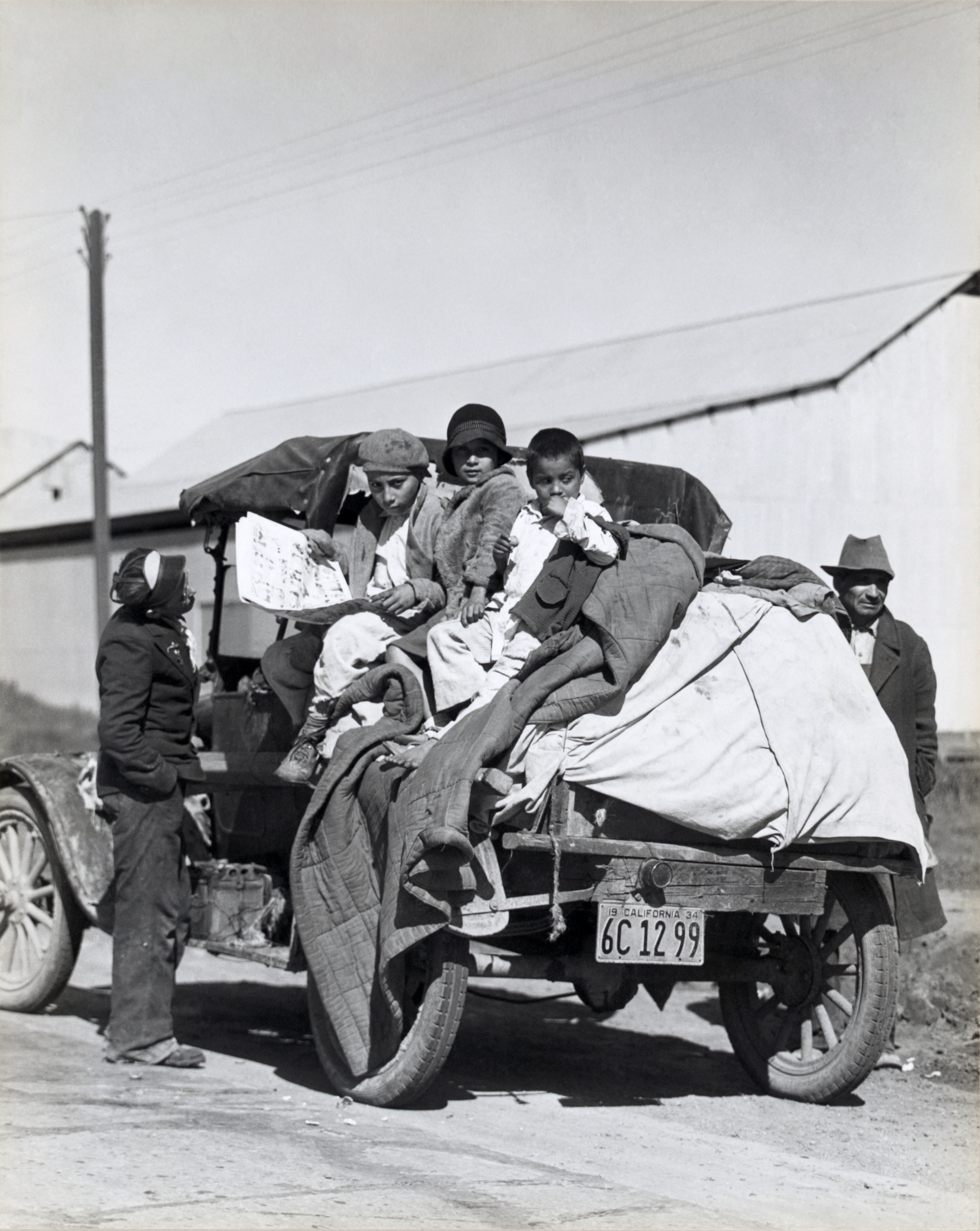
Migrant workers in California, 1935

A migrant worker is a person who migrates within a home country or outside it to pursue work. Migrant workers usually do not have an intention to stay permanently in the country or region in which they work.

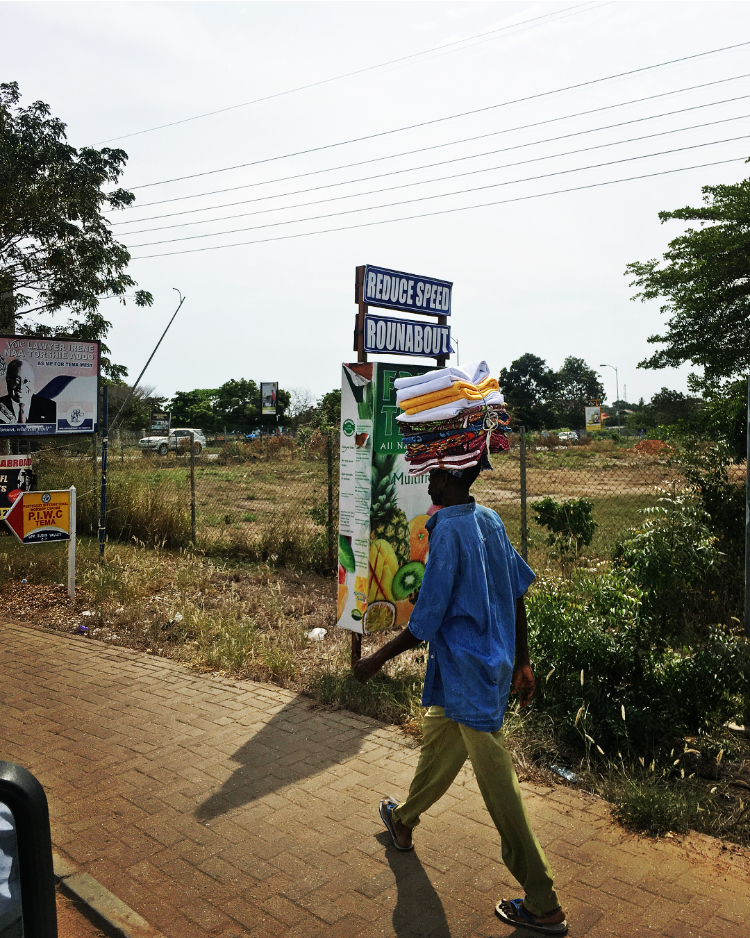
In Ghana, a migrant hawker carries colorful textiles on his head for sale

Migrant workers who work outside their home nation are also known as foreign workers. They may also be called expatriates or guest workers, especially when they have been sent for or invited to work in the host country before leaving the home country.

The International Labour Organization estimated in 2019 that there were 169 million international migrants worldwide. Some countries have millions of migrant workers. Some migrant workers are illegal immigrants or slaves.

== Definition ==
The International Organization for Migration's Global Migration Data Analysis Centre states that "there is no internationally accepted statistical definition of labour migration", but refers to the International Labour Organization (ILO)'s definition: "international migrants who are currently employed or unemployed and seeking employment in their present country of residence".

== Worldwide ==
An estimated 14 million foreign workers live in the United States, which draws most of its immigrants from Mexico, including 4 or 5 million illegal workers. It is estimated that around 5 million foreign workers live in northwestern Europe, half-a-million in Japan, and 5 million in Saudi Arabia. A comparable number of dependents are accompanying international workers.

=== Americas ===
==== United States ====
There are approximately 14 million non-permanent workers in the United States. Today it is estimated that there are about 10.7 million undocumented migrant workers in the United States, many of whom come from Mexico and other countries in Central America. These workers often travel to the United States to look for occupational opportunities and to provide economic stability for their families. These workers risk their lives to cross the border - facing extreme heat and the risk of being caught by border control to find jobs in the United States, often facing language barriers, cultural shock, stigma, and discrimination upon reaching the United States. In the United States 65% of farm workers are Latino, with about half of the workers being undocumented.

The jobs available to undocumented migrant workers in America are often in the domestic, industrial and agricultural field. These jobs are often physically demanding and are often dangerous. All of these workers are exposed to fast paces, and repetitive motions at work which can easily lead to injury. In the domestic field many, often female, migrant workers are subject to physically demeaning cleaning jobs that involve harsh chemical cleaners that have adverse health effects. Industrial workers often have to use heavy machinery without proper training or safety protocols. In the agricultural field, the workers spend long days doing intense physical labor often in extreme weather conditions such as storms and heat. The workers are also exposed to unsafe levels of pesticides, herbicides, and fertilizers, which can lead to respiratory illness, dermatitis, cancer, and reproductive problems. If these workers do get injured or sick from work, they are left to navigate the American healthcare system without insurance and with a language barrier. The undocumented nature of many migrant workers in the United States leads to the exploitation of the population as a whole. The lack of government regulation of employers that hire migrant workers means that the workers work long hours in adverse conditions for little pay. These workers often live in unsafe living conditions that are overcrowded and often unsanitary. Additionally, they are at constant risk of sudden deportation, which leads to migrant workers accepting poor working conditions and unlivable wages from their employers. This leads to employers exploiting migrant workers by subjecting them to unhealthy working conditions for poverty wages. Socially, migrant workers face social stigma and discrimination as they are referred to as "illegal migrants".

Additionally, migrant workers are one of the most vulnerable groups in regards to the impending climate crisis. These workers are already exposed to long work days in extreme conditions. The nature of agricultural, industrial, and construction work puts these migrant workers at higher rates of heat stroke, sun exposure, and injuries caused by storm conditions. The climate crisis will disproportionately affect migrant workers because of the intensive outdoor nature of their work and the lack of access they have to social resources.

==== Canada ====
Foreign nationals are admitted into Canada on a temporary basis if they have a work permit, study permit, are seeking asylum, or under special permits. Migrant workers generally enter as work permit holders under the Temporary Foreign Worker Program (TFWP) or the International Mobility Program (IMP); the key distinction between the programs being the requirement for Canadian employers to obtain a positive or neutral labour market impact assessment (under the TFWP) or an exemption from this process (IMP). Most work permits (~70%) issued in 2018 were under the IMP. Around 495,000 work permits were issued in 2018, while closer to 328,000 were issued in 2008, representing an increase of over 50 percent over the decade. All work authorizations under the TFWP are granted by the issuance of work permits conditional to one employer and job offer, also called "employer-specific" or "closed" work permits. The IMP facilitates both employer-specific and open work permits, as well as work permit exemptions. Open work permits allow migrant workers to change employers, with limited exceptions. With respect to the difference in volumes and admissions of permanent immigrants (i.e., those who have the right to reside permanently) and migrant workers, in 2008, the intake of non-permanent immigrants, had overtaken the intake of permanent immigrants (247,243). The contributions that migrant workers make in Canada are diverse and significant as they work in a wide range of occupations - harvesting fruits and vegetables, caring for children and the elderly, driving long-haul transport trucks, as well as working in IT, academica and medicine.

Since the 1960s, farmers in Ontario and other provinces have been meeting some of their seasonal labour needs by hiring temporary workers from Caribbean countries and, since 1974, from Mexico under the Canadian Seasonal Agricultural Workers Program (CSAWP). This federal initiative allows for the organized entry into Canada of low- to mid-level skilled farm workers for up to eight months a year to fill labour shortages on Canadian farms during peak periods of planting, cultivating, and harvesting of specified farm commodities. The program is run jointly with the governments of Mexico and the participating Caribbean states, which recruit the workers and appoint representatives in Canada to assist in the program's operations.

Non-agricultural companies in Canada have begun to recruit under the temporary foreign worker program since Service Canada's 2002 expansion of an immigration program for migrant workers.

In 2002, the federal government introduced the Low Skill Pilot Project to allow companies to apply to bring in temporary foreign workers to fill low skill jobs. The classification of "low skill" means that workers require no more than high school or two years of job-specific training to qualify.

==== Latin America ====
Immigrants often take any available job, often in the fields. The work often consists of hard manual labour, often with unfair pay. The article "Migrant Farmworkers: Is government doing enough to protect them?" by William Triplett states that the median annual income was $7,500, and 61% had income below the poverty level. Immigrants try to find a way to feed their families, and may end up being exploited. Triplett also notes that since 1989, "their average real hourly wages (in 1998 dollars) had dropped from $6.89 to $6.18", and that immigrants suffer physical as well as economic exploitation in the work place.

=== Asia ===
In Asia, some countries in East and Southeast Asia offer workers. Their destinations include Japan, South Korea, Hong Kong, Taiwan, Singapore, Brunei and Malaysia.

Foreign workers from selected Asian countries, by destination, 2010-11: Thousands
	Source Country								
Destination	Nepal	Bangladesh	Indonesia	Sri Lanka	Thailand	India	Pakistan	Philippines	Vietnam
Brunei		2	11		3	1	66	8	
Taiwan			76		48			37	28
Hong Kong			50		3		22	101	
Malaysia	106	1	134	4	4	21	2	10	12
Singapore		39	48	1	11		16	70	0
Japan	1	0	2	0	9	-	45	6	5
South Korea	4	3	11	5	11	-	2	12	9

==== China ====
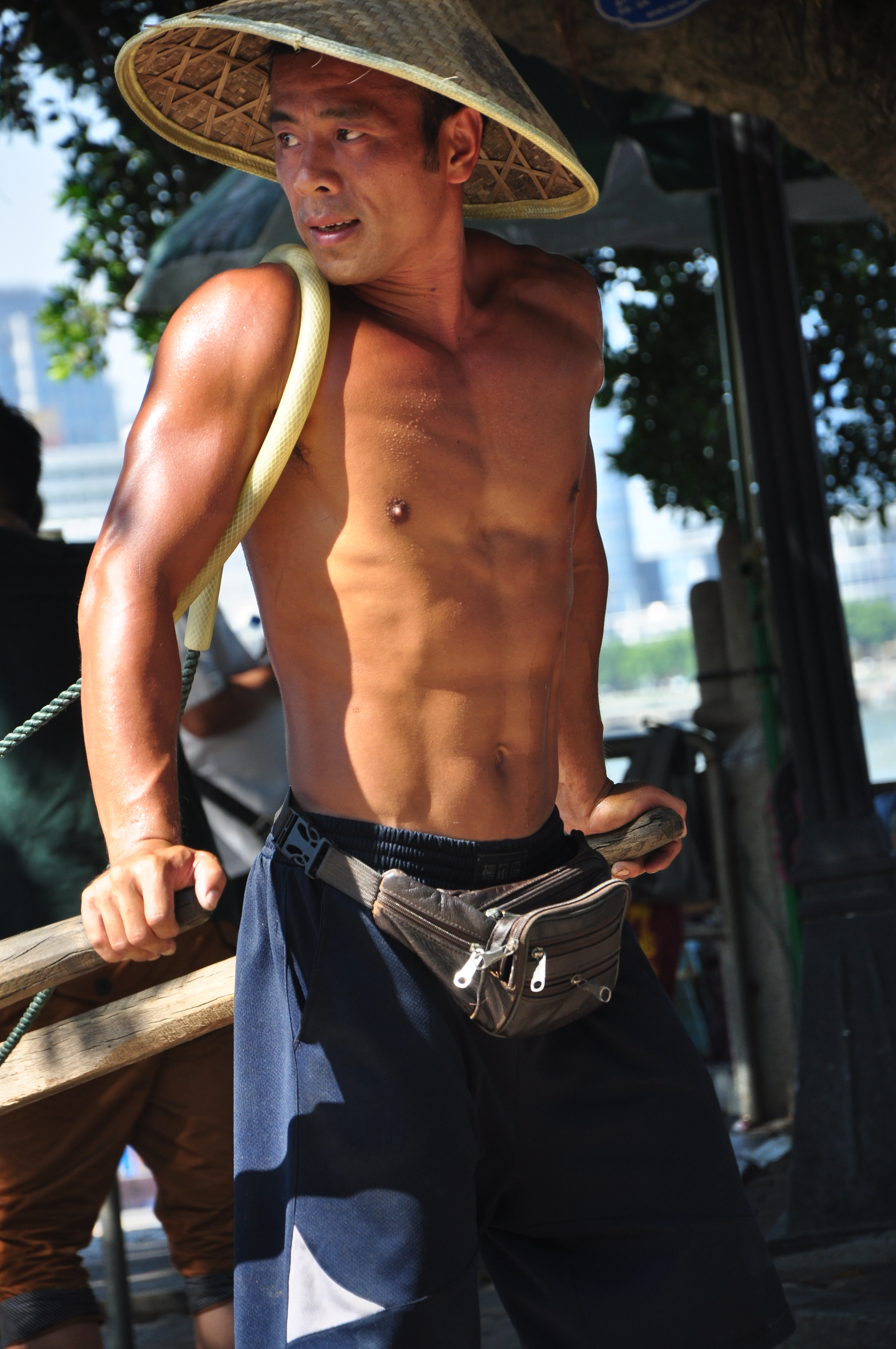
A Mingong working in China

Overall, the Chinese government has tacitly supported migration as means of providing labour for factories and construction sites and for the long-term goals of transforming China from a rural-based economy to an urban-based one. Some inland cities have started providing migrants with social security, including pensions and other insurance. In 2012, there were a reported 167 million migrant workers in China, with trends of working closer to home within their own or a neighbouring province but with a wage drop of 21%. Because so many migrant workers are moving to the city from rural areas, employers can hire them to work in poor working conditions for low wages. Migrant workers in China are notoriously marginalized, especially because of the hukou system of residency permits, tying one stated residence to all social welfare benefits.

==== India ====
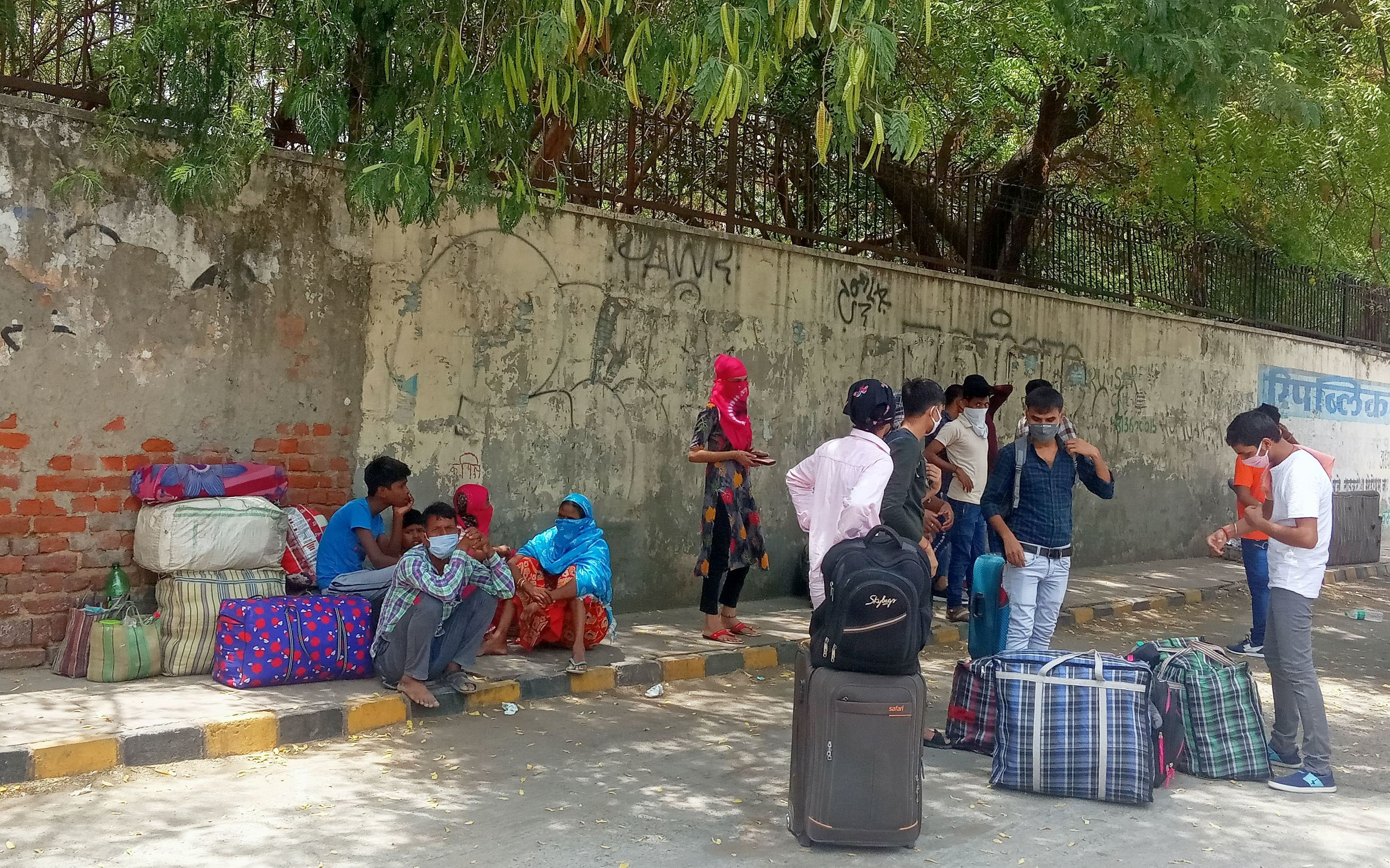
Stranded migrant workers in India during COVID-19 lockdown

Migration in India is induced by both penuriousness and prosperity. India has a large migrant population; every third person in India is a migrant. As per the 2011 census, migrants constitute 455.8 (approx.) millions of India's 1.21 billion (approx.) population which is 37.68 percent of the total population.9 This includes interstate migrants and intrastate migrants. Out of 455.8 million migrants, 67.93% are women and 32.07% are men. The predominant reason for migration among women was cited as marriage. This reason for migration was stated by around 42.4 million migrants out of 65.4 million female migrants in total. Among males, 'Work/Employment' was the most significant reason for migration, 12.3 million out of 32.8 million total male migrants cited this reason for migration. There has been a substantial flow of people from Bangladesh and Nepal to India over recent decades in search of better work. Researchers at the Overseas Development Institute found that these migrant workers are often subject to harassment, violence, and discrimination during their journeys at their destinations and when they return home. Bangladeshi women appear to be particularly vulnerable.

==== Turkmenistan ====
In Turkmenistan 17 April 2025 was declared a national observance day to promote migrant worker rights and general display.

==== Indonesia ====
The migrant worker population of Indonesia, the world's fourth largest, has contributed to their surplus of work forces. Combined with a scarcity of jobs at home, that has led numbers of Native Indonesians to seek work abroad. It is estimated that around 4.5 million Indonesians work abroad; 70% of them are women; most are employed in the domestic sector as maids and in the manufacturing sector, and most of them are between 18 and 35 years old. Around 30% are men, mostly working in plantations, construction, transportation, and the service sector. Malaysia now employs the largest numbers of Indonesian migrant workers, followed by Taiwan, Saudi Arabia, Hong Kong, and Singapore. These are official numbers, but the actual numbers might be far larger because of unrecorded illegal entry of Indonesian workers into foreign countries. They are prone to exploitation, extortion, physical and sexual abuses, suffered by those enduring human trafficking. Several cases of abuses upon Indonesian migrant workers have been reported, and some have gained worldwide attention.

==== Japan ====
Japan, with the world's most aged population and the resulting deficit in labour force, is a net importer of migrant workers, especially from the rest of Asia and South America. According to the Ministry of Health, Labour and Welfare, there were 2.05 million foreign residents registered as workers as of October 2023, which is a 185% increase since 2013. Vietnam (26.2%), China (23.0%), and the Philippines (11.1%) were the largest sources of these workers, while the number of Indonesian and Burmese workers has increased by more than 50% since 2022. The manufacturing industry was the largest employer. A Ministry of Foreign Affairs report concludes there were 1.29 million Japanese people residing overseas as of October 2023, but this number includes people such as those studying abroad and those living with families abroad, and the exact number of Japanese nationals working overseas is not clear.

Some news reports suggest that the country's stagnant economy since the 1990s, and more recently the weak yen beginning in 2022, have made Japan less attractive as a work-abroad destination, but so far the rapid influx of migrant workers has continued.

==== Malaysia ====
During the Seventh Malaysia Plan (1995–2000), Malaysia's total population increased by 2.3% per year, while foreign residents (non-citizens) make up 7.6% of the total working-age population in Malaysia, not including illegal foreign residents. In 2008 the majority of migrant workers (1,085,658: 52.6%) originally came from Indonesia. This was followed by Bangladesh (316,401), Philippines (26,713), Thailand (21,065) and Pakistan (21,278). The total number of migrant workers from other countries was 591,481. Their arrival, if not controlled, will decrease the local population's employment opportunities. However, the arrival of migrant workers increased the country's output and reduced the wage rates in the local labor market. Despite the benefits achieved by both the sending and receiving countries, many problems arise in the receiving country, Malaysia. The number of migrant workers currently in Malaysia is very difficult to determine, although the numbers working legally, with a passport and a work permit, are known.

==== Nepal ====
Labour migration from Nepal is one of the main backbone of Nepal's economy.Lack of job opportunities in Nepal and huge income gaps are a few of the reasons Nepali youths are attracted to overseas migration.

==== Philippines ====
In 2013, the Commission on Filipinos Overseas (CFO) estimated that approximately 10.2 million Filipinos worked or resided abroad. In the census year of 2010, about 9.3 percent of Filipinos worked or resided abroad. (Note: Calculation: Domestic population (2010): ~92.34 million Overseas Filipinos (2010): ~9.45 million Some sources have indicated that there are on the order of 3 million additional Filipinos working illegally abroad. These have not been included in this calculation. Total Filipinos (2010): ~101.79 million 9.45 million is about 9.3% of 101.79 million.)

More than a million Filipinos every year leave to work abroad through overseas employment agencies, and other programs, including government-sponsored initiatives. Overseas Filipinos often work as doctors, physical therapists, nurses, accountants, IT professionals, engineers, architects, entertainers, technicians, teachers, military servicemen, seafarers, students and fast food workers. Also, a sizable number of women work overseas as domestic helpers and caregivers. The Philippine Overseas Employment Administration is an agency of the Government of the Philippines responsible for opening the benefits of the overseas employment program of the Philippines. It is the main government agency assigned to monitor and supervise recruitment agencies in the Philippines.

On 30 December 2021, President Rodrigo Duterte, signed Republic Act 11641, creating the Department of Migrant Workers.

==== Singapore ====
Since the late 1970s, Singapore has become one of the major receiving countries of migrant workers in Southeast Asia with 1,340,300 foreign workers constituting 37% of the total workforce in December 2014. This is the largest foreign labour force in Asia as a proportion of population. About 991,300 of Singapore's foreign workers fall under the category of unskilled or low-skilled. In 2019, there were 322,700 male construction workers and 222,500 female domestic workers in Singapore. Many came from Bangladesh, India, Indonesia, Sri Lanka, the Philippines or Thailand. In 2020, it was reported that of the 1.4 million foreign workers in Singapore, nearly 1 million were in low paid, low skilled work. Such jobs are often perceived by local Singaporeans as less attractive since they are dirty, physically demanding, and potentially dangerous.

Observers such as the OCBC Bank economist Selena Ling say migrant workers are necessary given the ageing labour force and a low fertility rate. In order to control the large amount of these workers, Singapore implemented migration policies with visa categories for different skill levels. Employers are regulated in the proportion of foreign workers (called the "dependency ratio ceiling") and must pay a tax called the foreign worker levy for each foreign worker. The maximum foreign worker quota and levy vary by industry and skill of the workers. The government reports the numbers of foreign workers annually. In 2005, economist Ivan Png, then a nominated Member of Parliament, proposed to auction the rights to employ foreign workers. The proposal was rejected by the government as artificial and not meeting social objectives.

The COVID-19 pandemic led to further concerns about treatment of migrant workers, especially those in dormitories. COVID-19 in the dormitories saw a more rapid spread of the virus compared to the rest of the population in Singapore. According to the Minister of Manpower, Josephine Teo, approximately 200,000 workers live in 43 dormitories in Singapore with about 10 to 20 workers sharing each room.

It was announced that from January 2021, a new insurance scheme would be introduced to cover migrant workers against critical illnesses, non-work related deaths, with the employers needing to pay premiums of $9 a year per worker.

Singapore issues a particular category of work permit for foreigners limited to domestic work. The number of foreign domestic workers (FDWs) increased from about 201,000 in 2010 to 255,800 in 2019, or by 27 percent. As of 2019, one of every five Singaporean household hires a maid. In 1990, the ratio was about one in 13, with about 50,000 maids in Singapore at that time.

==== South Korea ====
Like many nations, South Korea started as a labour exporter in the 1960s before its economic development in the 1980s changed it to a labor importer. In 1993, the Industrial Trainee Program was established to meet the needs of migrant workers. It provided work for foreigners as trainees in small and medium-sized businesses. However, these workers were considered trainees and not official employees, so they could not receive protection under Korean labour laws. On 14 February 1995 Guidelines for the Protection and Management of Foreign Industrial Trainees provided legal and social welfare for migrant workers. The Act on the Employment of Foreign Workers which states that "a foreign worker shall not be given discriminatory treatment on the ground that he/she is a foreigner", was put into force on 16 August 2003. Later that year the numbers of migrant workers multiplied dramatically.

Even though there has been a drastic rise of migrant workers in Korea and policies are in place for their protection, the lack of cheap labour in Korea has forced the Korean community to condone the maltreatment of illegal migrant workers, and other unsavoury practices. In response, the Korean government has increased the quota for migrant workers by 5,000, to 62,000 individuals in 2013. In addition, on 31 January 2013, the minimum wage for migrant workers increased to 38,880 KRW for eight hours per day or a monthly rate of 1,015,740 KRW. Programs were put into place to protect migrant workers and ease their integration to Korean society. Programs sponsored by the government such as Sejonghakdang (세종학당), Multicultural Center of Gender Equality and Family Program, Foreign Ministry Personnel Center Program, and Ministry of Justice Social Integration Program provide free Korean language lessons for migrant workers. In addition, by fulfilling all the requirements of the Ministry of Justice Social Integration Program, migrant workers can apply for Korean citizenship without taking the Naturalization exams.

The E-9 Non-professional Employment visa was launched in order to hire foreigners to work in the manual labour field. The visa is only limited to people that come from 15 Asian countries including, the Philippines, Mongolia, Sri Lanka, Vietnam, Thailand, Indonesia, Uzbekistan, Pakistan, Cambodia, China, Bangladesh, Nepal, Kazakhstan, Myanmar and East Timor. A new visa, known as the C-3 visa, was launched on 3 December 2018 which allows one to stay in South Korea for up to 90 days within the visa's validity period of up to 10 years with no restrictions on the number of visits to the country. The visa is specifically designed for professionals like doctors, lawyers or professors, graduates who are enrolled in four-year-plus programs in South Korean universities and those with master's degrees or above from overseas. The visa is only granted to people from 11 Asian countries those being Bangladesh, Cambodia, India, Indonesia, Laos, Myanmar, Nepal, Pakistan, the Philippines, Sri Lanka and Vietnam.

Traditionally, South Korea has appeared to largely accept overseas ethnic Koreans such as the Koreans of China and other Asians. Under the Employment Permit System launched in 2004 for foreign worker registration, 55% of those registered in 2007 were ethnic Koreans, mostly Chinese nationals of Korean descent. Among those who weren't ethnic Koreans, most were Asian with the largest groups being the Vietnamese, Thais, Mongolians, Indonesians and Sri Lankans. In 2013, there were 479,426 foreigners working in South Korea and holding nonprofessional working visas and 99% of them came from other Asian countries with ethnic Koreans from China at 45.6%, Vietnamese at 11.8%, Indonesians at 5.9%, Uzbeks at 5.1%, ethnic Chinese at 4.2%, Cambodians at 4%, Sri Lankans at 3.9%, Thais at 3.9%, Filipinos at 3.8% and Nepalis at 3.3%. The vast majority of foreign workers in South Korea come from other parts of Asia with most coming from China, Southeast Asia, South Asia, and Central Asia.

Since taking office in June 2025, President Lee Jae Myung has pursued a policy shift aiming to reduce South Korea's reliance on low-wage foreign labor, arguing that the heavy reliance on migrant workers in key industries undermines domestic wage levels.

==== Sri Lanka ====
Sri Lanka is currently a net emigration country, however in recent years a gradual rise in immigrant workers in Sri Lanka has coincided with the decline in the departure of Sri Lankans leaving the country for overseas employment. As a result, the country has now been transitioning from a country that only sends workers overseas to one that both sends and receives migrant workers. Thousands of foreign workers have entered the country from other Asian countries to work in Sri Lanka with 8000 coming from China and others coming from Nepal, Myanmar, Bangladesh and India. In addition to lawfully residing and working foreigners in the country, there are those that have over-stayed their visas or have illegally entered the country. In 2017, there were 793 investigations on unauthorised workers in the country and 392 foreign nationals were removed. The number of illegal Nepali migrants hiding in Sri Lanka prompted Nepal to launch an investigation in 2016 in order to crack down on the illegal movement of its citizens into Sri Lanka. An estimate from a Sri Lankan minister in 2017 put the number of foreign workers in the country at 200,000. However this number has been disputed. Additionally, there have been allegations that there are 200,000 illegal workers from China, India and Bangladesh working in the country, however certain parties have also dismissed this claim.

==== Taiwan ====
As of June 2016, there are more than 600,000 migrant workers in Taiwan which are spread across different sectors of industry, ranging from construction workers, domestic helpers, factory workers and other manual jobs. Most of them come from Southeast Asia. A 2020 Greenpeace investigation found significant evidence for the abuse of foreign laborers in the Taiwanese distant water fishing industry. Taiwanese conglomerate FCF was specifically singled out for links to illegal fishing and forced labor.

==== Thailand ====
In Thailand, migrants come from bordering countries such as Burma, Laos and Cambodia. Many face hardships such as lack of food, abuse, and low wages with deportation being their biggest fear. In Bangkok, Thailand many migrant workers attend Dear Burma school where they study subjects such as Thai language, Burmese language, English language, computer skills and photography.

=== Europe ===
==== European Union ====
In 2016, around 7.14% (15,88,300 people) of total EU employment were not citizens, 3.61% (8,143,800) were from another EU Member State, 3.53% (7.741.500) were from a non-EU country. Switzerland 0.53%, France 0.65%, Spain 0.88%, Italy 1.08%, United Kingdom 1.46%, Germany 1.81% were countries where more than 0.5% of employees were not citizens. United Kingdom 0.91%, Germany 0.94% are countries where more than 0.9% of employees were from non-EU countries. countries with more than 0.5% employees were from another EU country were Spain 0.54%, United Kingdom 0.55%, Italy 0.72%, Germany (until 1990 former territory of the FRG) 0.87%.

The recent expansions of the European Union have provided opportunities for many people to migrate to other EU countries for work. For both the 2004 and 2007 enlargements, existing states were given the rights to impose various transitional arrangements to limit access to their labour markets. After the Second World War, Germany did not have enough workers so laborers from other European states were invited to work in Germany. This invitation ended in 1973 and these workers were known as Gastarbeiter.

1 March has become a symbolic day for transnational migrants' strike. This day unites all migrants to give them a common voice to speak up against racism, discrimination and exclusion on all levels of social life. The transnational protests on 1 March were originally initiated in the US in 2006 and have encouraged migrants in other countries to organise and take action on that day. In Austria the first transnational migrants' strike (Transnationaler Migrant innenstreik) took place in March 2011, in the form of common actions, e.g. a manifestation, but also in form of numerous decentralised actions.

==== Armenia ====
In 2016, the International Organization for Migration (IOM) reported that Armenia had the highest rate of labor migration in the South Caucasus and Eastern Europe region, with an estimated 5.2 million people having migrated between 2010 and 2016. The report also noted that over half of these migrants (55.3%) were temporary workers and that the majority of them had migrated to four countries: Russia (33.5%), the United States (14.2%), Germany (7%), and France (6.7%).

The main destination for Armenian seasonal workers is Russia. Until the end of the 1990s, there was an act of a third huge wave of Armenian emigrants, which accounted for about one million people. The main destination was the Russian Federation (620,000) ․ When Armenia became Independent (1991), the number of people who leave the country permanently slowed down, whereas, the number of seasonal labor migrants mainly to Russia increased. According to a study conducted by the Ministry of Territorial Development and Administration, 95% of seasonal migrants and 75% of long-term migrants work in Russia as of the end of the year 2018, and the reason is supposed to be the membership with the Eurasian Economic Union (EAEU). The First Deputy Minister of Territorial Administration and Development of Armenia, Vache Terteryan, once said:

"We must ensure that our labor force feels comfortable both at home and in EAEU countries," said Mr. Terteryan, speaking at a meeting of the Advisory Committee on Migration Policy under the UNECE (UN Economic Commission for Europe). "They must also feel comfortable in third countries. The principles of reciprocity in terms of length of service, pay, pensions, medical care and so on should be respected."

The Armenian government has attempted to reduce labor migration by developing the economy and creating jobs. However, these efforts have been hindered by the country's volatile economic situation, which is largely due to the conflict with Azerbaijan over the Nagorno-Karabakh region. According to the International Labor Organization, the Armenian economy has been in recession since 2009, with unemployment rising from 10.3% in 2009 to 20.4% in 2015. This has led many Armenians to seek better economic opportunities abroad. The Armenian government has taken steps to protect its citizens from exploitation and abuse while working abroad, such as establishing the State Migration Service of Armenia (SMS) in 2016. The SMS is responsible for promoting safe and legal labor migration, as well as for providing assistance for returning migrants.

==== Finland ====
According to the Finnish trade union organizations SAK (Central Organisation of Finnish Trade Unions) and PAM Finnish Service Union United PAM foreign workers were increasingly abused in the construction and transportation sectors in Finland in 2012, in some cases reporting hourly wages as low as two euros. Bulgarians, Kosovars and Estonians were the most likely victimised in the building trade.

==== Germany ====
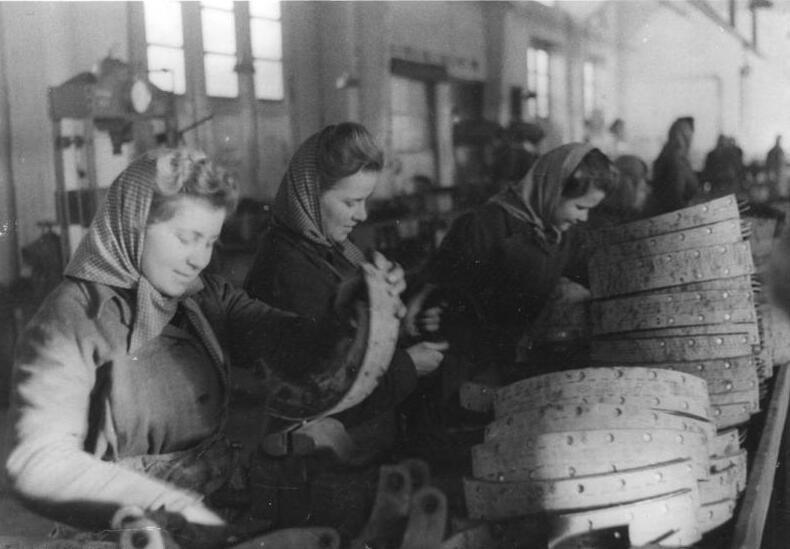
Soviet civilians forced to work in a repair plant for engine parts, Berlin 1945

In Nazi Germany, from 1940 to 1942, Organization Todt began its reliance on guest workers, military internees, Zivilarbeiter (civilian workers), Ostarbeiter (Eastern workers) and Hilfswillige ("volunteer") POW workers.

The great migration phase of labor migrants in the 20th century began in Germany during the 1950s, as sovereign Germany since 1955 due to repeated pressure from NATO partners yielded to the request for closure of the so-called 'Anwerbe' Agreement (German: Anwerbeabkommen). The initial plan was a rotation principle: a temporary stay (usually two to three years), followed by a return to their homeland. The rotation principle proved inefficient for the industry, because the experienced workers were constantly replaced by inexperienced ones. The companies asked for legislation to extend the residence permits. Many of these foreign workers were followed by their families in the following period and stayed forever. Until the 1970s, more than four million migrant workers and their families came to Germany like this, mainly from the Mediterranean countries of Italy, Spain, the former Yugoslavia, Greece and Turkey. Since about 1990, with the disintegration of the Soviet bloc and the enlargement of the European Union, guest workers have primarily been coming to Western Europe from Eastern Europe. Sometimes, a host country sets up a program in order to invite guest workers, as did the Federal Republic of Germany from 1955 until 1973, when over one million guest workers (German: Gastarbeiter) arrived, mostly from Italy, Spain and Turkey.

==== Russia ====
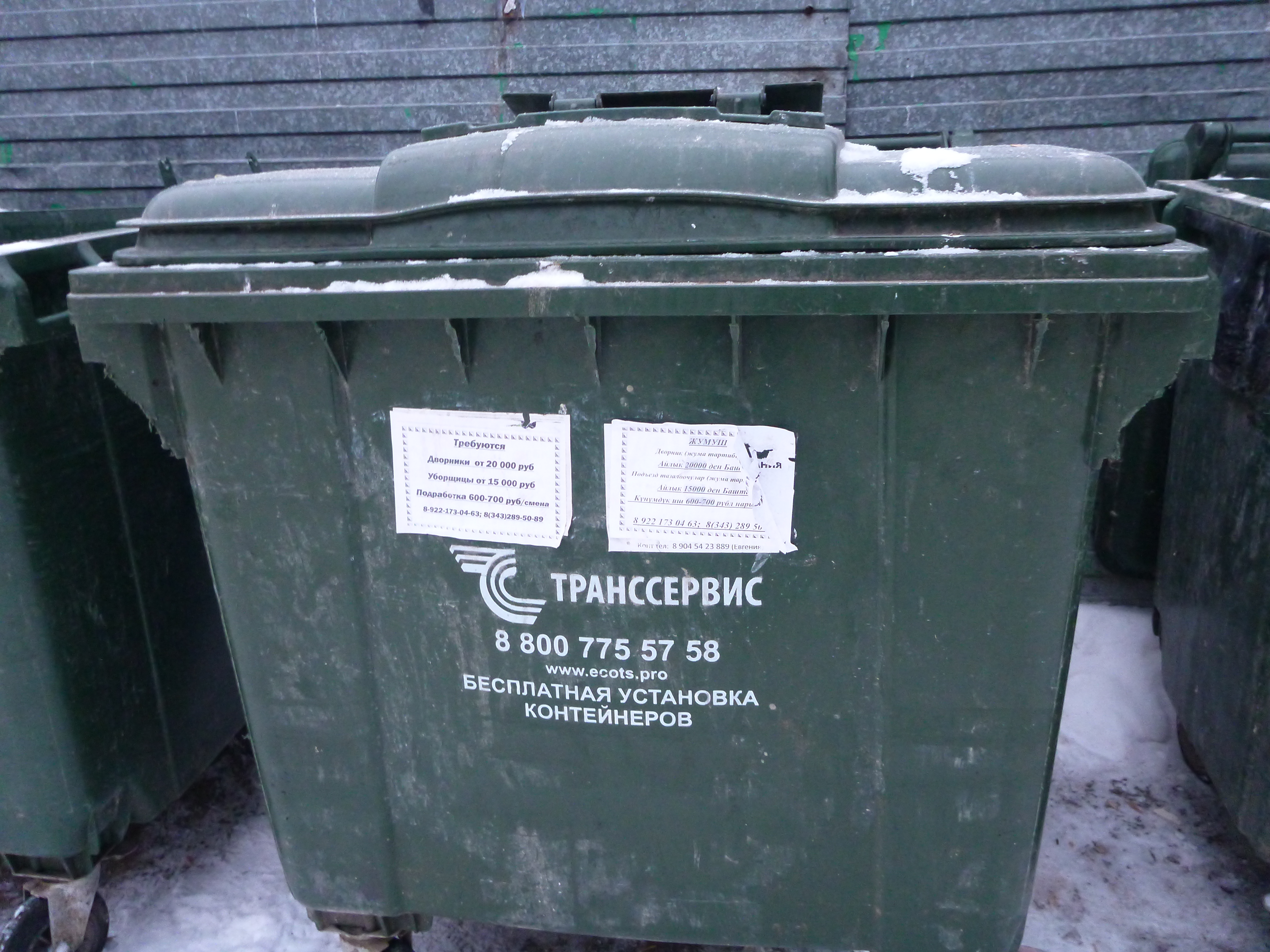
A janitor vacancy advert in Russian and Kyrgyz languages, Yekaterinburg, Russia

A custom known as otkhodnichestvo operated in the Russian Empire, in poorer agricultural areas the peasants, usually men, were forced to temporarily migrate away from their place of residence to supplement their income. This was not necessarily seasonal. In some governorates, otkhodniks constituted up to 40% of adult male population.

In modern Russia, a considerable part of workforce in several regions of Russian Far North are fly-in fly-out workers. They work for longer shifts and live in shift settlements during work shifts.

Foreign migrant workers in Russia are commonly referred to by the German word as "gastarbeiters" (Russian: гастарбайтеры, romanized: gastarbaytery). They form a significant part of Russia's workforce since the dissolution of the Soviet Union. Comprising as much as 25% of the workforce, the majority of migrant workers come from Central Asia and the South Caucasus, and often work in low-skilled jobs. A considerable amount of them are illegal immigrants. As of 2020, there were 11.58 million international migrants in Russia or about 7.9% of the total population, making Russia the country with the fourth largest migrant population.

==== Sweden ====
Since December 2008, Sweden has more liberal rules for labor immigration from 'third countries' – countries outside the European Union and European Economic Area – than any other country in OECD. The introduction of employer-driven labor immigration, motivated by the need to address labor shortages, resulted in large inflows of migrants also in low-skilled occupations in labor surplus sectors, for example the restaurant and cleaning sectors.

==== Switzerland ====
The underestimation of the required integration services by the state and the society of the host countries, but also by the migrants themselves. Switzerland's transformation into a country of immigration was not until after the accelerated industrialization in the second half of the 19th century. Switzerland was no longer a purely rural Alpine area but became a European vanguard in various industries at that time, first of textile, later also the mechanical and chemical industries. Since the middle of the 19th century especially German academics, self-employed and craftsmen, but also Italians, who found a job in science, industry, construction and infrastructure construction migrated to Switzerland.

==== United Kingdom ====
In the United Kingdom, migrant workers, including seasonal workers, are protected by national employment laws. They should receive equal pay to British workers doing the same job and must be paid at least the national minimum wage.

Migrant workers can be denied National Health Service treatment unless they can afford to pay. Untreated illnesses can worsen and migrant workers can die from treatable illnesses that remain untreated.

Trade union UNISON's Scotland division published a "Charter for Migrant Workers" in June 2008, citing concerns about the exploitation of migrant workers in Scotland. The forms of exploitation they referred to included excessive costs being charged before migration for travel costs and paperwork, bullying and harassment and discrimination over pay and conditions. The union called instead for migrant workers to be offered "a traditional Scottish welcome", arguing also that employers who take a role in bringing overseas workers to the UK should also "be proactive in overseeing and assisting with suitable travel and accommodation arrangements" for them.

=== Middle East ===
When chattel slavery was abolished in the Arabian Peninsula by the 1960s, it was succeeded by the Kafala system.

In 1973, an oil boom in the Persian Gulf region, which includes the Gulf Cooperation Council (GCC), created an unprecedented demand for labor in the oil, construction and industrial sectors. Development demanded a labor force. This demand was met by foreign workers, primarily those from the Arab states, with a later shift to those from Asian countries. A rise in the standards of living for citizens of Middle Eastern countries also created a demand for domestic workers in the home.

Since the 1970s, foreign workers have become a large percentage of the population in most nations in the Persian Gulf region. Growing competition with nationals in the job sector, along with complaints regarding treatment of foreign workers, have led to rising tensions between the national and foreign populations in these nations.

Remittances are becoming a prominent source of external funding for countries that contribute foreign workers to the countries of the GCC. On average, the top recipients globally are India, the Philippines, and Bangladesh. In 2001, $72.3 billion was sent as remittances to the countries of origin of foreign workers, equivalent to 1.3% of the world GDP. The source of income remains beneficial as remittances are often more stable than private capital flows. Despite fluctuations in the economy of GCC countries, the amount of dollars in remittances is usually stable.

The spending of remittances is seen in two ways. Principally, remittances are sent to the families of guest workers. Though often put towards consumption, remittances are also directed to investment. Investment is seen to lead to the strengthening of infrastructure and facilitating international travel.

With this jump in earnings, one benefit that has been seen is the nutritional improvement in households of migrant workers. Other benefits are the lessening of underemployment and unemployment.

In detailed studies of Pakistani migrants to the Middle East in the early 1980s, the average foreign worker was of age 25–40 years. 70 percent were married, while only 4 percent were accompanied by families. Two thirds hailed from rural areas, and 83 percent were production workers. At the time, 40 percent of Pakistan's foreign exchange earnings came from its migrant workers.

Domestic work is the single most important category of employment among women migrants to the Arab States of the Persian Gulf, as well as to Lebanon and Jordan. The increase of Arab women in the labour force, and changing conceptions of women's responsibilities, have resulted in a shift in household responsibilities to hired domestic workers. Domestic workers perform an array of work in the home: cleaning, cooking, child care, and elder care. Common traits of the work include an average 100-hour work week and virtually non-existent overtime pay. Remuneration differs greatly according to nationality, often depending on language skills and education level. This is seen with Filipina domestic workers receiving a higher remuneration than Sri Lankan and Ethiopian nationals.

Saudi Arabia is the largest source of remittance payments in the world. Remittance payments from Saudi Arabia, similar to other GCC countries, rose during the oil boom years of the 1970s and early 1980s, but declined in the mid-1980s. As oil prices fell, budget deficits mounted, and most governments of GCC countries put limits on hiring foreign workers. Weaknesses in the financial sector and in government administration impose substantial transaction costs on migrant workers who send them. Costs, although difficult to estimate, consist of salaries and the increased spending required to expand educational and health services, housing, roads, communications, and other infrastructure to accommodate the basic needs of the newcomers. The foreign labor force is a substantial drain of the GCC states' hard currency earnings, with remittances to migrants' home countries in the early 2000s amounting to $27 billion per year, including $16 billion from Saudi Arabia alone. It has been shown that the percentage of the GDP that foreign labor generates is roughly equal to what the state has to spend on them.

The main concerns of developed countries regarding immigration centers are: (1) the local job seekers' fear of competition from migrant workers, (2) the fiscal burden that may result on native taxpayers for providing health and social services to migrants, (3) fears of erosion of cultural identity and problems of assimilation of immigrants, and (4) national security.

In immigrant-producing countries, individuals with less than a high school education continue to be a fiscal burden into the next generation. Skilled workers, however, pay more in taxes than what they receive in social spending from the state. Emigration of highly skilled workers has been linked to skill shortages, reductions in output, and tax shortfalls in many developing countries. These burdens are even more apparent in countries where educated workers emigrated in large numbers after receiving a highly subsidized technical education.

A report by Robert Fisk revealed that the housemaids in the Arab region's Saudi Arabia, Abu Dhabi, and Kuwait were subjected to dreadful abuse at the hands of their employers. From countries like the Philippines and Sri Lanka, the maids were often tortured, beaten, burned, and even sexually assaulted. Embassies of the respective nations received complaints of human rights abuse from dozens of such maids every year.

As of 2007, 10 million workers from Southeast Asia, South Asia, or Africa live and work in the countries of the Persian Gulf region. Xenophobia in receiving nations is often rampant, as menial work is often allocated only to foreign workers. Expatriate labor is treated with prejudice in host countries despite government attempts to eradicate malpractice and exploitation of workers. Emigrants are offered substandard wages and living conditions and are compelled to work overtime without extra payment. With regards to injuries and death, workers or their dependents are not paid due compensation. Citizenship is rarely offered and labor can often be acquired below the legal minimum wage. Foreign workers often lack access to local labor markets. Often, these workers are legally attached to a sponsor/employer until completion of their employment contract, when a worker must either renew a permit or leave the country.

Racism is prevalent towards migrant workers. With an increasing number of unskilled workers from Asia and Africa, the market for foreign workers became increasingly racialized, and dangerous or "dirty" jobs became associated with Asian and African workers noted by the term "Abed", meaning dark skin.

Foreign workers migrate to the Middle East as contract workers by means of the kafala, or "sponsorship" system. Migrant work is typically for a period of two years. Recruitment agencies in sending countries are the main contributors of labor to GCC countries. Through these agencies, sponsors must pay a fee to the recruiter and pay for the worker's round-trip airfare, visas, permits, and wages. Recruiters charge high fees to prospective employees to obtain employment visas, averaging between $2,000 and $2,500 in such countries as Bangladesh and India. Contract disputes are also common. In Saudi Arabia, foreign workers must have employment contracts written in Arabic and have them signed by both the sponsor and themselves in order to be issued a work permit. With other GCC countries, such as Kuwait, contracts may be written or oral.

Dependence on the sponsor (kafeel) naturally creates room for violations of the rights of foreign workers. Debt causes workers to work for a certain period of time without a salary to cover these fees. This bondage encourages the practice of international labour migration as women in situations of poverty are able to find jobs overseas and pay off their debts through work. It is common for the employer or the sponsor to retain the employee's passport and other identity papers as a form of insurance for the amount an employer has paid for the worker's work permit and airfare. Sponsors sell visas to the foreign worker with the unwritten understanding that the foreigner can work for an employer other than the sponsor.

When a two-year work period is over, or a job loss is lost, workers must either find another employer willing to sponsor them or return to their nation of origin within a short time. Failing to do this entails imprisonment for violation of immigration laws. Protections are nearly non-existent for migrant workers. With work conditions often equating to modern-day slavery, it has also been reported that suicide rates are over five times higher for migrant workers than citizens of the UAE.

The population in the current GCC states has grown more than eight times during 50 years. Foreign workers have become the primary and dominant labor force in most sectors of the economy and the government bureaucracy. With rising unemployment, GCC governments embarked on the formulation of labor market strategies to improve this situation, to create sufficient employment opportunities for nationals, and to limit the dependence on expatriate labor. Restrictions have been imposed: the sponsorship system, the rotational system of expatriate labor to limit the duration of foreigners' stay, curbs on naturalization and the rights of those who have been naturalized, etc. This has also led to efforts to improve the education and training of nationals. Localization remains low among the private sector, however, because of the traditionally-low income that the sector offers. Other reasons are long working hours, a competitive work environment, and the need to recognize an expatriate supervisor, often difficult to accept.

In 2005, low-paid Asian workers staged protests in some GCC countries, including Bahrain and Kuwait, for not receiving salaries on time, and some of them were violent. In March 2006, hundreds of mostly South Asian construction workers stopped work and went on a rampage in Dubai, UAE, to protest their harsh working conditions, low or delayed pay, and general lack of rights. Sexual harassment of Filipina housemaids by local employers, especially in Saudi Arabia, has become a serious matter. In recent years, this has resulted in a ban on the migration of females under 21. Such nations as Indonesia have noted the maltreatment of women in the GCC states, with governments calling for an end to the sending of housemaids altogether. In GCC countries, a chief concern with foreign domestic workers is childcare without the desired emphasis on Islamic and Arabic values.

Possible developments in the future include a slowdown in the growth of foreign labor. One contributor is a dramatic change in demographic trends. The growing birth rate of nationals in the GCC states will lead to a more competitive workforce. That could also lead to a rise in the numbers of national women in the workforce.

==== Israel ====
In 2010, the US Department of State issued a report which stated that "the Government of Israel does not fully comply with the minimum standards for the elimination of trafficking however it is making significant efforts to do so." It noted that Israel continued law enforcement actions against human trafficking, and established a shelter for labor traffic victims. However, the government did not identify the victims, and law enforcement and protection efforts diminished since transferring anti-trafficking duties from Immigration police to the Ministry of Interior.

The 2015 US Department of State report stated that some foreign workers experienced conditions of forced labour, including "the unlawful withholding of passports, restrictions on freedom of movement, limited ability to change or otherwise choose employers, nonpayment of wages, exceedingly long working hours, threats, sexual assault, and physical intimidation." The most vulnerable were foreign agricultural workers, construction workers, and nursing care workers (particularly women).

==== United Arab Emirates ====
The treatment of migrant workers in the UAE has been likened to "modern-day slavery". Migrant workers are excluded from the UAE's collective labour rights, hence migrants are vulnerable to forced labour. Migrant workers in the UAE are not allowed to join trade unions. Moreover, migrant workers are banned from going on strike. Dozens of workers were deported in 2014 for going on strike. As migrant workers do not have the right to join a trade union or go on strike, they don't have the means to denounce the exploitation they suffer. Those who protest risk prison and deportation. The International Trade Union Confederation has called on the United Nations to investigate evidence that thousands of migrant workers in the UAE are treated as slave labour.

Human Rights Watch have drawn attention to the mistreatment of migrant workers who have been turned into debt-ridden de facto indentured servants following their arrival in the UAE. Confiscation of passports, although illegal, occurs on a large scale, primarily from unskilled or semi-skilled employees. Labourers often toil in intense heat with temperatures reaching 40–50 degrees Celsius in the cities in August. Although attempts have been made since 2009 to enforce a midday break rule, these are frequently flouted. Those labourers who do receive a midday break often have no suitable place to rest and tend to seek relief in bus or taxi stands and gardens. Initiatives taken have brought about a huge impact on the conditions of the laborers. According to Human Rights Watch, migrant workers in Dubai live in "inhumane" conditions. The Reuters reported on 22 July 2020 about the expatriates community in Dubai, which has been affected largely by the economic crisis caused by coronavirus pandemic in the United Arab Emirates. The migrant workers are said to have become a target of the financial shortages and piling debts, forcing many to go days without food. Therefore, more than 200,000 migrant workers from India, Philippines, Pakistan, and Nepal have already left the emirate, as a result, according to Reuters.

Paid social media influencers in the UAE promoted it as an ideal tourist destination. However, several migrant workers began to use the TikTok application highlighting the other side. While influencers with even few thousand followers received free meals, free products and free trips in exchange of promotion, the viral videos and million views on the videos of these low-paid blue collar workers of the UAE provided no enhancement in lifestyle. Despite being famous on TikTok, these migrants continued to earn low wages and shared room with a dozen of other people.

Agents in the UAE had been using Instagram to run black-market networks, where women recruited from Africa and Asia are being advertised to be picked for domestic jobs by employers. Nearly 200 accounts in the Persian Gulf are operating on the basis of these services, where the pictures of women along with their personal details are posted. Human rights activists said that migrant workers recruited through such informal channels are at a higher risk of trafficking and other forms of exploitation, even though the workers employed through licensed agency and proper documentation also face difficult situations.

Near the end of June 2021, security officers in the UAE raided the residential buildings in Abu Dhabi to arrest about 700 African migrants. The workers were cuffed during the first two weeks of their detention and besides being subjected to racial slurs and physical abuse, they were also refused access to basic medical aid such as sanitary pads to women. ImpACT International and Euro-Mediterranean Human Rights Monitor released a report detailing the accusations of racially motivated human rights violations. According to the report, more than a dozen female African workers arrested were subjected to sexual harassment by the officers who raided their houses and touched their private parts while they were asleep in their nightwear during the raid. Some of these African migrants worked as waiters, assistant nurses, teachers, oil and gas contractors, nannies, etc. More than 20 people went on record to share their testimonies about the abuse by UAE officials against them and their fellow workers from Cameron, Uganda, and Nigeria on the night of the raid.

Some of the African migrants deported by the UAE amongst the approximately 700 workers, included Cameroonians, who feared returning to their country due to the region being mired in violent crime due to the ongoing conflict. Ngang Rene, one of the many Cameroonian migrant workers arrested and deported, warned Emirati authorities about the dangerous conditions in the North West region. Nevertheless, he was deported, forcing him to trek with his wife day and night to reach a safe zone.

==== Saudi Arabia ====
On 4 August 2020, The Guardian revealed abhorrent condition of migrant workers held in Saudi Arabia's detention centers, which were terribly overcrowded with insanitary conditions and lack of adequate healthcare. The report also revealed cases of physical abuse inside the immigration detention centers. In a time of increased dangers from COVID-19, the detainees suffered from high risk of infection in crowded institutions.

In December 2020, the Human Rights Watch (HRW) researchers interviewed migrants in Saudi detention centers, where nearly 350 of them are kept in unsanitary rooms. Many of them are beaten to death by guards. The migrants kept in camps included Indians, Pakistanis, Chadians, Ghanaians, Kenyans, Nigerians and Somalis.

In March 2021, Saudi Arabia introduced some amendments to the existing labour laws. Despite claiming to improve working conditions for all migrant workers, the new reforms still bar formations of trade unions and strikes. Also, it doesn't include over 3.7 million domestic workers who become victims of serious abuses in the country. Many workers have complained of forced confinement, long working hours without any day off and rampant physical and sexual abuse in the country.

==== Qatar ====
Migrant workers in Qatar account for six times as many people as naturalized citizens, with the largest sending communities being India, amounting to 23.58% of the total population of Qatar, Nepal, which makes up 17.3%, and the Philippines, which makes up 9.65%. Migrant workers makeup the majority of Qatar's labor force at 94%. These populations are so large that in 2009 a study found that Nepalese migrant workers in Qatar were responsible for contributing 5% of Nepal's GDP.

Due to Qatar's goal of becoming an "advanced nation" by 2030, the largest growing migrant sector has become construction. Migrant construction workers in Qatar face unique abuses in the form of poor living and labor conditions. In the three years leading up to 2013, the Qatari construction sector accounted for 1200 labor migrant deaths. Numbers are especially high amongst private sectors, with statistics from 2008 reporting that 99.5% of non-citizens comprise the sector compared to 42% of non-citizens in the public sector.

Additionally, FIFA named Qatar the host of the 2022 World Cup in 2010 which drew attention to the abuses of Qatar's migrant population as the country planned to spend over 200 billion dollars on World Cup-associated construction projects, which would require upwards of 1.5 million new labor migrants to enter the country. These infrastructure projects increase abuses and international pressure to improve labor conditions, however, to relatively little effect. In 2015, it was projected that by 2022, there would be nearly 4,000 additional migrant deaths in Qatar.

=== Oceania ===
==== Australia ====
Migrant workers in Australia hold the same employment rights as Australian citizens, regardless of their migration status. In 2019-2021 temporary migrants held 7.8% (Note: Per source, temporary and permanent migrants held 26.3% of jobs, and temporary migrants held 29.5% of this amount.) of jobs in Australia. In 2023 there were 1.9 million people (7% of the population) living in Australia on a temporary visa with working rights, including 680,000 New Zealanders in Australia. Although many of these migrants seek permanent residency in Australia, only 195,000 permanent visas were available in 2023.

==== Pacific Islands ====
Tens of thousands of migrant workers travel to Australia and New Zealand on seasonal work visas every year under Australia's Pacific Australia Labour Mobility scheme (PALM, which also includes Timor-Leste) and New Zealand's Recognised Seasonal Employer Scheme (RSE). In 2023 almost 48,000 workers participated in the two schemes, including over 20% the male working-age population of Tonga and Vanuatu. The schemes have been touted as providing significant income and remittance opportunities for Pacific nations, as well as providing vital labour for industries such as horticulture in Australia and New Zealand. However, the impact of the schemes on Pacific countries is increasingly perceived as negative, removing skilled workers from these countries' economies, separating families, and failing to up-skill temporary workers. Despite being entitled to the same employment rights and minimum wage as New Zealanders, several instances of exploitation of RSE workers have been reported.

== Migration, work, and health ==
Both migration and work are both acknowledged as Social Determinants of Health.

== Female migrant workers ==
According to the ILO, 48 per cent of all international migrants are women and they are increasingly migrating for work purposes. In Europe alone there are 3 million women migrant workers. The 1970s and 1980s have seen an increase in women migrant labourers in France and Belgium. In China, as of 2015 a third of their migrant workers were women who had moved from rural towns to bigger cities in search of employment. Female migrants work in domestic occupations which are considered part of the informal sector and lack a degree of government regulation and protection. Minimum wages and work hour requirements are ignored and piece-rates are sometimes also implemented. Women's wages are kept lower than men's because they are not regarded as the primary source of income in the family.

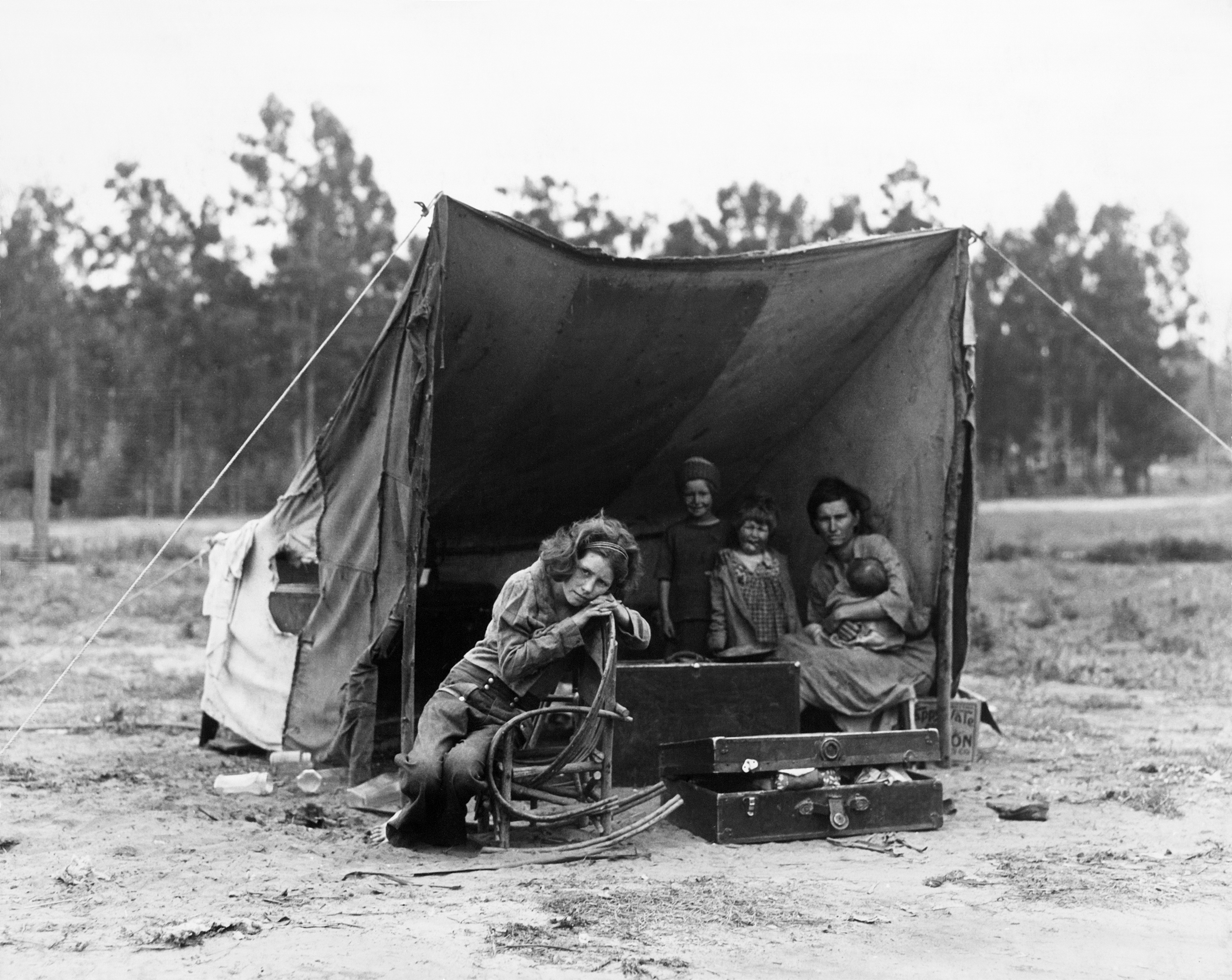
Migrant agricultural worker's family, California, 1936

Women migrate in search of work for a number of reasons and the most common reasons are economic: the husband's wage is no longer enough to support the family. In some places, like China, for instance, rapid economic growth has led to an imbalance in the modernization of rural and urban environments, leading women to migrate from rural areas into the city to be a part of the push for modernization. Other reasons include familial pressure, on a daughter, for instance, who is seen as a reliable source of income for the family only through remittances. Young girls and women are singled out in families to be migrant workers because they have no viable alternative role to fulfil in the local village. If they go to work in the urban centres as domestic workers, they can send home money to help provide for their younger siblings. Many of these women come from developing countries, and are low skilled. Additionally women who are widowed or divorced and have limited economic opportunities in their native country may be forced to leave out of economic necessity. Migration can also substitute for divorce in societies that do not allow or condone divorce.

=== Impact on roles within family ===
In terms of migrant labour, many women move from a more oppressive home country to a less oppressive environment where they have actual access to waged work. As such, leaving the home and obtaining increased economic independence and freedom challenges traditional gender roles. This can be seen to strengthen women's position in the family by improving their relative bargaining position. They have more leverage in controlling the household because they have control over a degree of economic assets. However, this can lead to hostility between wives and husbands who feel inadequate or ashamed at their inability to fulfil their traditional role as breadwinner. The hostility and resentment from the husband can also be a source of domestic violence. Studies have also been done which point to changes in family structures as a result of migrant labour. These changes include increased divorce rates and decrease in household stability. Additionally, female migrant labour has been indicated as a source for more egalitarian relationships within the family, decline of extended family patterns, and more nuclear families. There is also a risk for infidelity abroad, which also erodes the family structure.

Researchers identified three groups of women to represent the dimensions of gender roles in Singapore. The first group is made up of expatriate wives who are often reduced to dependent spouse status by immigration laws. The second group are housewives who left work in order to take care of the children at home. Although they are from the Singaporean middle class, they are stuck at almost the same level and share status with the third group, foreign domestic workers. Because of global economic restructuring and global city formation, the mobility of female labours is increasing. However, they are controlled through strict enforcement and they are statistically invisible in migration data. The female foreign domestic workers are always gender-stereotyped as maids and generalized as low wages workers in society.

=== Women migrant workers in the informal sector ===
The spread of global neoliberalism has contributed to physically displaced people, which translates to displaced workers, worldwide. Due to the national and transnational economic push and pull of migration, growing numbers of women migrant workers find themselves employed in the underground and informal sector. To be clear, these women tended not to be previously employed in the formal sector, if at all. Frequently, the cheap and flexible labor is sought in more developed areas. Also, these women migrant workers are often considered an asset to employers who think of these individuals as docile, compliant, and disposable.

Work found in the informal economy is defined as being outside the legal regulation of the state. The underground sector includes nontraditional types of employment: intimate care, street vending, community gardening, food selling, sewing and tailoring, laundry service, water selling, car cleaning, home cleaning, and various kinds of artisan production. These positions are frequently precarious and lack the social contracts often found between employee and employer in the formal sector. This unofficial economy is often found in locations that are between home and work and combine personal and private spaces. Because migrant women workers often occupy the lowest economic positions, this leaves them especially vulnerable to exploitation and dangerous working conditions. Incidentally, Guy Standing has termed this kind of vulnerable worker, the Precariat.

Women are frequently at the bottom of the economic hierarchy from various factors, mainly a lack of opportunity to support themselves and their families and a lack of adequate education. Despite the United Nations' Girls Education Initiative, there remains high rates of illiteracy among women in the Global South. Commonly, the informal sector is the only place in which geographically displaced workers can join the economy. Thus, women migrant workers perform much of the work found in the informal sector.

Partly because of complex migration issues, which include the restructuring of gendered and familiar relations, women migrant workers frequently care for children without a local family network. The informal sector allows for public and private space to be merged and accommodate their care-taking responsibilities. New immigrants are often concerned with leaving children unattended and the informal sector allows for care-taking alongside of economic activities.

Case studies have determined that men and women migrate for similar reasons. Both leave places in search of better opportunities, most often financially. In addition to the financial push, women also migrate to escape oppressive environments and/or abusive spouses.

=== Children of female migrant workers ===
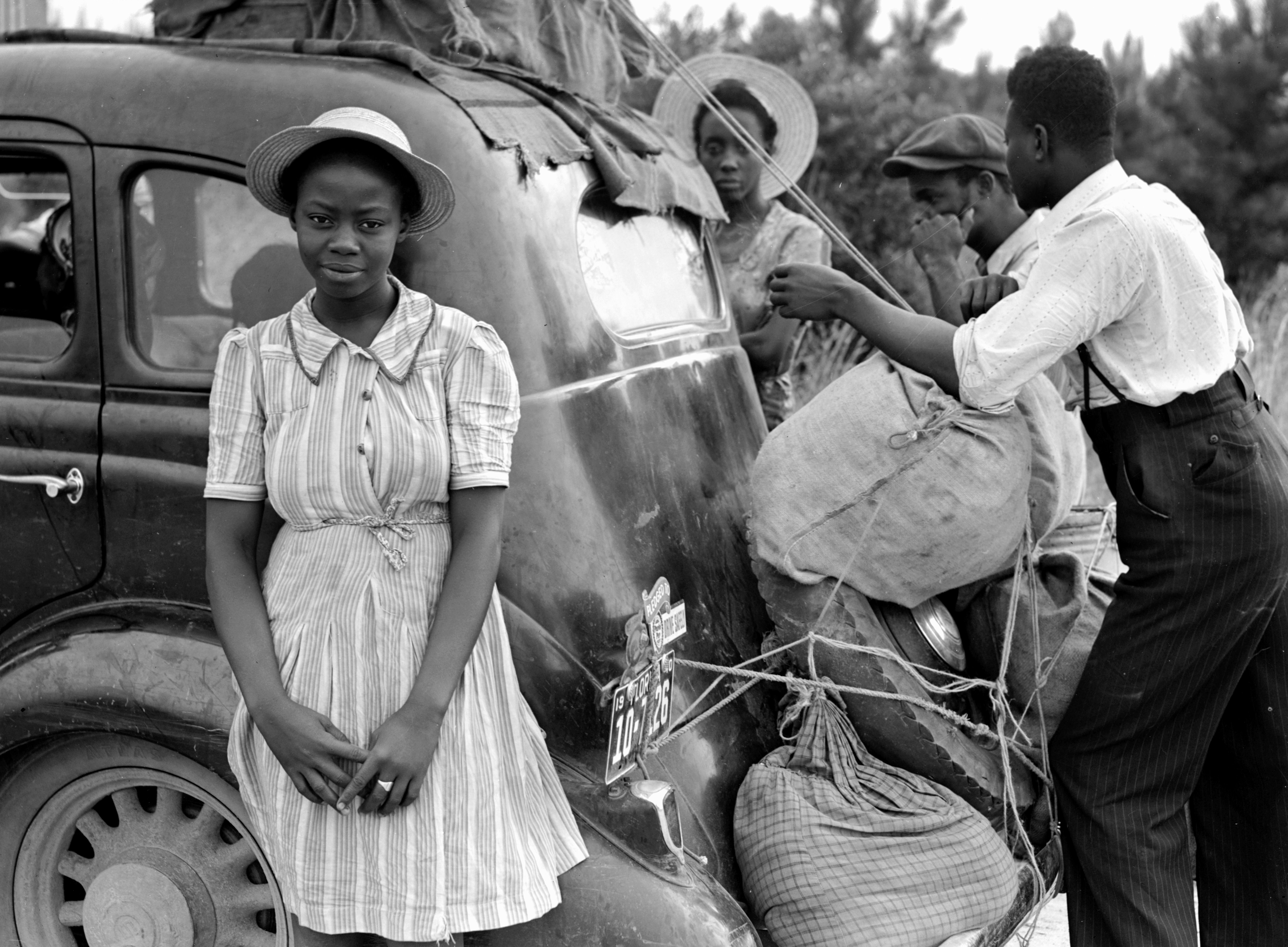
Group of Florida migrants near Shawboro, North Carolina, on their way to Cranbury, New Jersey, to pick potatoes

Migrant labour of women also raises special concerns about children. Female migrant workers may not have enough possibilities to care for their own children whilst being abroad. Their children may learn to regard their relatives at home as their parents and may rarely see their mothers. Frequently, children of migrant workers become migrant workers themselves. There is concern that this may have negative psychological effects on the children who are left behind. Although this has not been proven to be entirely true or false, studies have been done which show that many children of migrant workers manage reasonably well. One theory states that remittances to some degree make up for the lack of care by providing more resources for food and clothing. Additionally, some migrant mothers take great care in attempting to maintain familial relationships while abroad.

== Migrant education ==
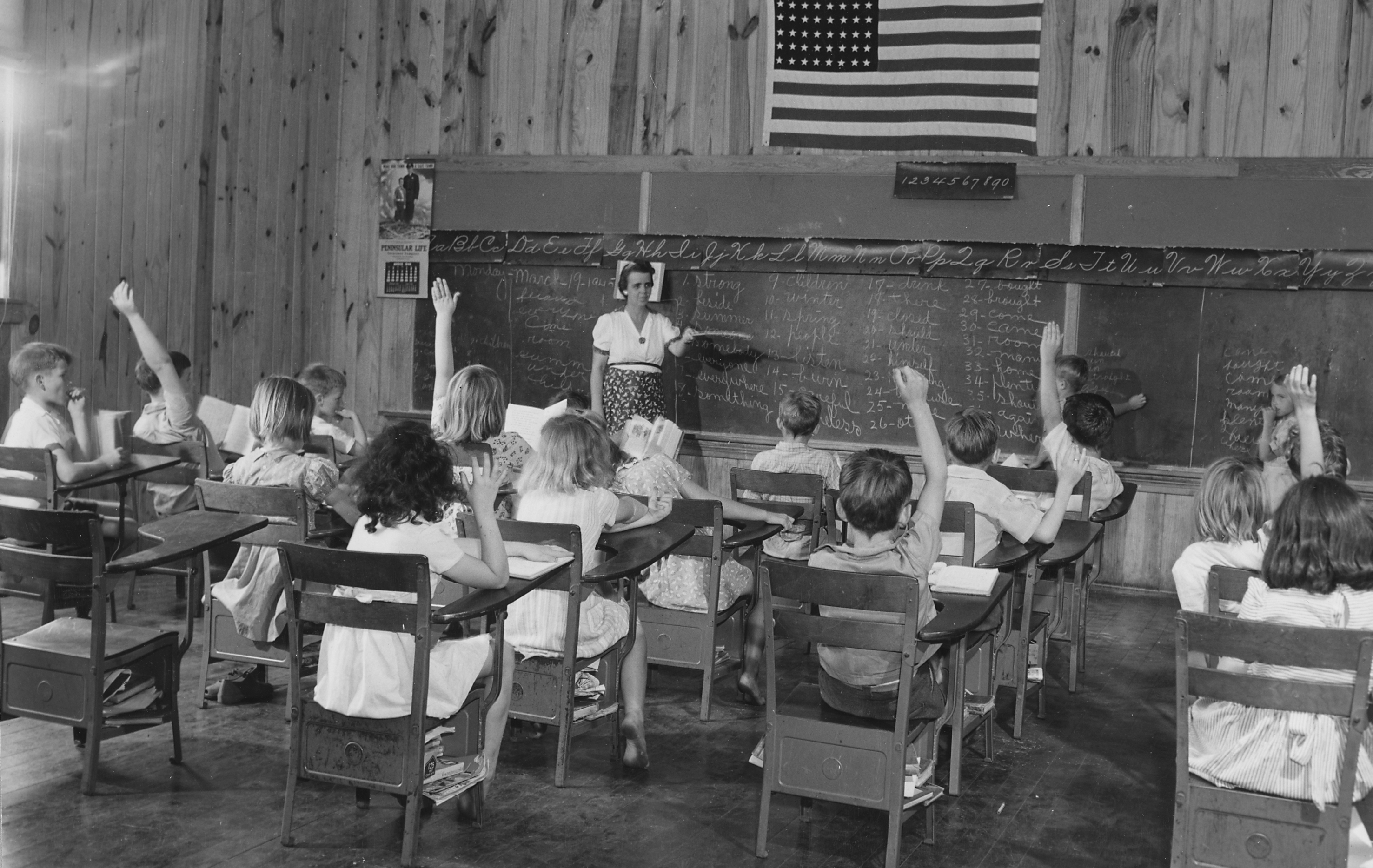
A school for the children of white migrant farm workers, circa 1945

Children of migrant workers struggle to achieve the same level of educational success as their peers. Relocation, whether a singular or a regular occurrence, causes discontinuity in education, which causes migrant students to progress slowly through school and drop out at high rates. Additionally, relocation has negative social consequences on students: isolation from peers due to cultural differences and language barriers. Migrant children are also at a disadvantage because the majority live in extreme poverty and must work with their parents to support their families. These barriers to equal educational attainment for children of migrant workers are present in countries all over the world. Although the inequality in education remains pronounced, government policies, non-governmental organizations, non-profits, and social movements are working to reverse its effects.

=== Migrant workers and literacy ===
In 2015, scholar Gabriela Raquel Ríos of the University of Central Florida published "Cultivating Land-Based Literacies and Rhetorics" in which she coins the phrase "land-based literacies and rhetorics." Her definition is as follows:

These literacies (acts of interpretation and communication) and rhetorics (organizational and community-building practices) ultimately build a theory that 1) recognizes the ways in which land can produce relations and 2) recognizes the value of embodied ways of knowing.

Ríos argues that migrant workers' rhetorical practices incorporate their relationship to land and labor in addition to language. Comparing the "ideology of literacy" (the normative expectation that migrant workers should learn to read and write, or to "speak a language of power, particularly [in the context of migrant workers in Florida] English or Spanish"), she notes that the farm worker activists with whom she has worked do not share this ideology. Gerardo Reyes, of the Coalition of Immokalee Workers states that, for him and other migrant workers, "due to the transient nature of their labor, learning English is the last thing on the list of important needs".

== Migrant labour force in economies ==
The migrant workforce has historically played a vital role nationally and across local communities in recent times. Economic globalization has created more migrant workers than ever existed before. While developed countries have increased their demand for labour, especially unskilled labour, workers from developing countries are also used. As a result, millions of workers and their families travel to other countries to find work. This influx of migrant workers contributes to growth of slums and urban poverty, according to Mike Davis. Some of these workers, usually from rural areas, cannot afford housing in cities and thus live in slums. Some of these unskilled workers living in slums suffer from unemployment and make a living in the informal sector. According to the International Labor Organization, as of 2013 there were approximately 175 million migrants around the world. In 2020 world migration 281 millions workers.

== Exploitation and enslavement of migrant workers ==
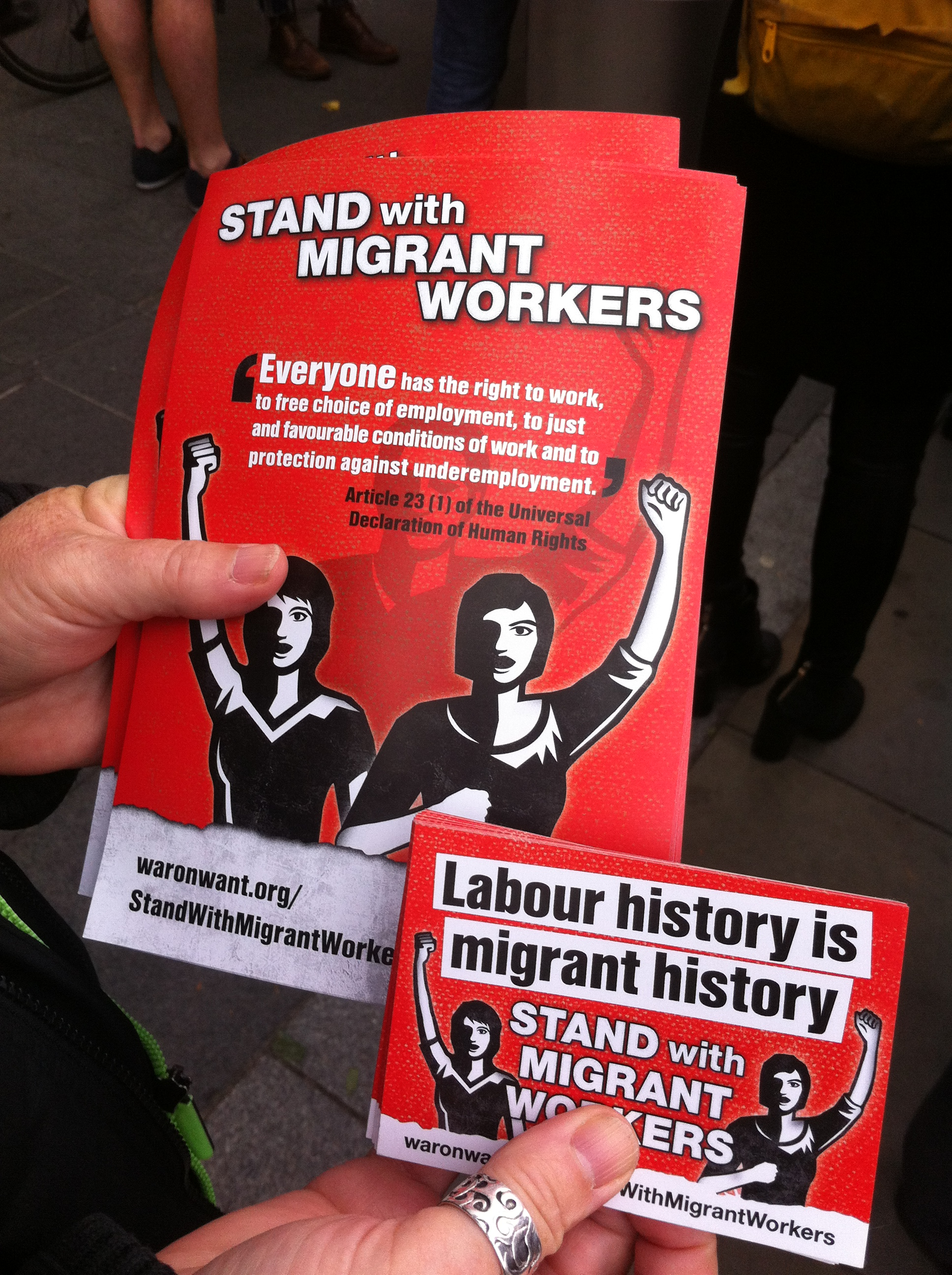
Protest banners on solidarity to migrant workers

The recruitment of international workers through employment agencies is a common phenomenon in developed countries, such as the United States or the UAE. Especially members of underprivileged communities are attracted by the opportunities of living and working in the US. Some of these agencies make fraudulent promises. But even worse than false promises, some migrants are abused and mistreated by the agencies and their middlemen. Some migrant workers may have their passports and mobile phones confiscated, are imprisoned in the employer's home or at least strictly overseen and disconnected from society, friends and family; some may not receive their full wage and have to work unrestrained long hours without breaks or days off. Migrant workers may also be denied adequate food and living conditions, as well as medical treatment.

In a study undertaken by the Human Rights Watch of 99 domestic workers in the United Arab Emirates, 22 alleged that their sponsors had physically abused them. Workers refuse to report their abuse for fear of deportation and not being able to find a better job. It is common in some cases for a woman to fall victim to sexual violence and harassment because stories by employer will be trusted more.

Some migrant workers flee from their abusive employers and seek help at the embassy or consulate of their home country, but that is difficult to achieve in remote locations.

=== Indian migrant workers in US ===
A United States company, Signal International, led by an immigration lawyer, Malvern C. Burnett, and an Indian labor recruiter, Sachin Dewan, "lured hundreds of Indian workers to a Mississippi shipyard with false promises of permanent US residency." This was under the H-2B visa guest worker program, to work as welders, pipefitters, and in other positions to repair damaged oil rigs and related facilities. Each worker paid the labor recruiters between $10,000 and $20,000 or more in recruitment fees and other costs after being promised good jobs, green cards, and permanent U.S. residency. Some went deep into debt. "On arrival at Signal shipyards in Pascagoula, Mississippi, beginning in 2006, they discovered that they wouldn't receive the green cards or permanent residency, and that in fact, each would have to pay $1,050 a month to live in isolated, guarded labor camps where as many as 24 men shared a space the size of a double-wide trailer."

==== Conviction ====
Signal International "had to compensate workers $14.4 million in a jury ruling to five Indian guest workers, one of the largest settlements of its kind in U.S. history. The ruling was based on the finding that the company and its agents engaged in labor trafficking, fraud, racketeering and discrimination, News India Times reported at that time. The jury also found that one of the plaintiffs was a victim of false imprisonment and retaliation."

=== Philippines migrant workers in US ===
There have been many cases of corruption among brokers who often act as if they have companies, often encouraging migrants to come to the United States. This was the case with broker, Kizzy Kalu was, "a naturalized United States citizen from Nigeria". "He secured government approval to bring in Filipino nurses under a government visa program, claiming they would be paid up to $72,000 as instructors at an Adam University in Colorado, according to a 2012 criminal indictment of the labor broker." Adams State University did exist in Colorado, however Adam University was nonexistent just as much as the jobs that were supposed to be there for migrants. "Kalu promised the nurses, most from the Philippines, jobs as nurse instructors/supervisors." "He arranged with the Departments of Labor and Homeland Security to provide H-1B visas for the workers, saying that Adam University faced a labor shortage and needed foreign labor to serve as nursing instructors/supervisors," as a way to lure workers in.

Kizzy Kalu and "other foreign nationals" received compensation for these visas after they had secured and received them for the soon-to-be-workers. "Kalu $6,500 for assistance in obtaining them. Upon arrival in Denver, Colorado, the nurses were told that there was no such place as Adam University. Instead, they were sent to "work in nursing homes. The facilities paid Kalu's company, Foreign Health Care Professionals Group, $35 per hour for one of the nurses. Kalu then pocketed almost half the wage and paid the nurse $20 an hour." He continued to exploit these workers by allowing them to work while he was gaining their profit. He had to report to the government about these women and that they were in fact working in the country so that he could continue to receive funds while they continued to work. "Documents he submitted to the government didn't indicate that he and his partner, Philip Langerman, were taking a large portion of the visa-holders' wages."

Eventually, the scheme that Kalu and his partner, Phillip Langerman created, began to become known to the public. Instead of the facilities paying the company that they had created together from the work the women were doing, the nurses were paid directly by the facilities but were required to pay Kalu $1,200 a month, or Kalu would send a letter to the Department of Homeland Security and they would lose their visas, prosecutors said. Soon, the nurses realized this kind of unfair treatment and mode of oppression and stopped paying him. Therefore, their visas got revoked because he reported the matter to officials.

==== Conviction ====
Kizzy Kalu was guilty of "trafficking in forced labor for luring foreign nurses to the United States with promises of high-paying jobs but then demanding they kick back a portion of their wages or face deportation." He was sentenced to nearly 11 years in prison and ordered to pay $3.8 million in restitution. He was convicted of 89 counts of mail fraud, visa fraud, human trafficking and money laundering. Kalu's partner, Philip Langerman, 78, of McDonough, Ga., was sentenced to three years of probation for his role in the criminal scheme. He, too, must pay restitution of $3.8 million." U.S. District Chief Judge Marcia Krueger said in this case unlike many others, "Kalu did not sexually assault, isolate or strike his victims. She describe these cases as "fraud and economic coercion."

==== Other cases in US ====
There are other fraudulent cases by United States companies that recruit and employ Filipino workers. On 19 March 2013, in an article titled, "Filipino Workers Urge Overhaul of U.S. Guest Worker Policies", information is provided about the corruption in labor. "The shipyard, Grand Isle Shipyard (GIS) in L.A., put the Filipinos to work on an oil production platform owned by Black Elk Energy, a U.S. company that, according to federal regulators, had racked up 315 documented "incidents of safety non-compliance" offshore since 2010.The problems at Black Elk Energy were amplified following an explosion in November on a platform in the Gulf of Mexico that claimed the lives of three Filipino workers, while three others were seriously injured." The problem became known because the work at the company had been very dangerous even before they were hired and so work was stopped. However, that did not stop GIS, which needed to make money. Unfortunately the migrant workers were the ones who suffered.

"The main [hazardous condition] is the sleep deprivation that they experience – just long hours of work that the [U.S.] workers don't face. They're forced to work sometimes for two weeks straight, 70 hours a week." Many skillful men from the Philippines who were "welders, pipefitters and scaffolders were trafficked under "fraudulent" contracts that promised high pay and safe working conditions. But many were placed for work on dangerous oil rig platforms."

=== Mexican migrant workers in US ===
Since the early 1980s, increasing numbers of Mexican women have migrated to the United States in search of jobs. The women usually leave their families, including young children, behind to help maintain their families by sending remittances. After arriving in the US, many are put to work and live in places that are neither clean nor safe. Companies and traffickers promise legitimate jobs in America because they make money doing so.

An article, "Girl Next Door", by Peter Landsman examines the system, which is said to be brutal and inhumane oppression of migrant workers. "On a tip, the Plainfield police raided the house in February 2002, expecting to find illegal aliens working an underground brothel. What the police found were four girls between the ages of 14 and 17. They were all Mexican nationals without documentation. But they weren't prostitutes; they were sex slaves. The distinction is important: these girls weren't working for profit or a paycheck. They were captives to the traffickers and keepers who controlled their every move." These girls, a large percentage underage, are forcefully lured from their homeland in Mexico and other parts of Latin America.

"They had been promised jobs as models and babysitters in the glamorous United States, and they probably had no idea why they were sitting in a van in a backwater like Tijuana in the early evening."

"The police found a squalid, land-based equivalent of a 19th-century slave ship." There were doorless bathrooms, decaying sinks and mattresses, morning after pills (medications that can induce abortion) and girls were pale, exhausted and malnourished. However, this is just an example of one of the apartments and houses that were affected by this type of abuses. Many other houses or neighborhoods in the U.S. that seem to be upscale and upper class are infested with these types of illegal actions.

=== Migrant workers in Europe ===
In the agricultural sector (such as the strawberry industry) in some countries in Europe (Spain, Italy), sexual harassment, rape, and even sexual exploitation occurs.

== Migrant workers' rights ==
The International Labour Organization (ILO)'s first International Labour Conference, held in Washington DC in 1919, adopted a Recommendation concerning Reciprocity of Treatment of Foreign Workers which recommended to each member state that their laws for the protection of their own workers, including the right of lawful organization, should be extended on equal terms to migrant workers. The Recommendation treated labour migration as a state-directed programme, referring to "condition[s] of reciprocity and upon terms to be agreed between the countries concerned". In the light of this principle of equality, most of the ILO instruments intended to protect the rights of migrant workers are the generic ones which refer to the rights of all workers.

The People's Movement for Human Rights Education (PDHRE) composed a list of fourteen rights for migrant workers. The United Nations Sustainable Development Goal 10 also advocates for the implementation of planned and well-managed migration policies and a reduction in the transaction costs of migrant remittances.

=== Philippines migrant workers' rights ===
"The Philippine government has long lauded the fact that, every day, some 4,500 Filipinos are sent abroad to work. The remittances they send back keeps the Philippine economy afloat. The government doesn't seem to provide any protection when these overseas Filipino workers run into distress. This labour export policy is still one of their pillars of development – pushing people to other countries instead of addressing poverty or lack of jobs at home." Instead of sending workers out just because the process helps the economy at their countries of origin, the country needs to examine ways to work with its people to obtain jobs or at least to create more jobs. When their skilled workers come to the United States and are often sexually, physically, and mentally exploited, it affects the workers but also the country upon their return, if they are able to return at all because of the conditions that they face. They are risky jobs, and journeys taken by migrants to ensure themselves better lives and also families make governments need to do more. "The exploitative immigration system of the U.S. works hand-in-hand with the corrupt labour export policy of the Philippines to maintain a steadily increasing flow of cheap, temporary migrant labour."

=== Bangladeshi migrant workers' rights ===
Between the months of July and September in 2020, Bangladeshi authorities arbitrarily detained about 370 Bangladeshi migrant workers after their return to the country from abroad. They had been detained on the allegation of committing criminal activities in foreign nations without any credible evidence of any kind in support. Amnesty International called the detention a violation of the International Covenant on Civil and Political Rights (ICCPR).

== Effects on migrant workers' health ==
Migrant workers often have poorer health and shorter life expectancy relative to the general population. Migrant workers are often undocumented, making it much harder for them to seek protections under the labor laws of the country they are in. Many employers take advantage of this fact and create dangerous working conditions. These risks often result in high rates of work-related diseases and injuries among migrant workers.

Migrant workers often work in more hazardous occupations, under informal work arrangements and to lower wages compared to non-migrant workers, which pose them at an increased risk of work related illness. Studies show that migrant workers are at higher risk of work injuries than non-immigrant workers. Many labor migrants undergo forms of health screenings or assessments, with the high testing procedure costs, the tests are often paid by the migrants. This testing often does not ensure referral for necessary treatments or medical follow up. Migrants also report higher level of perceived discrimination and bullying at the workplace compared to non-migrant workers.

In the United States, migrant farm workers experience work-related bone problems, respiratory problems and allergic reactions. The life expectancy compared to average is 26 years less for a migrant worker in the U.S.

In Asia, a survey by Lien Centre for Social Innovation in Singapore found that over 60 per cent of lower-skilled South Asian migrant workers who are waiting for salary or injury compensation from employers were predicted to have serious mental illness.

The World Health Organization and the International Labour Organization estimate that an estimated 745,000 fatalities from ischemic heart disease and stroke events occurred in 2016 due to long working hours. Officials of the organizations noted that migrant workers were amongst the populations most exposed to long working hours, which put them at risk of fatalities and disability from cardiovascular diseases.

== National vs. transnational migrations ==
Like transnational migration, national (internal) migration plays an important role in poverty reduction and economic development. For some countries, internal migrants outnumber those who migrate internationally. For example, 120 million people were estimated to migrate internally in China compared to 458,000 people who migrated internationally for work. Situations of surplus labour in rural areas because of scarcity of arable land is a common "push factor" in the move of individuals to urban-based industries and service jobs. Environmental factors including drought, waterlogging, and river-bank erosion also contribute to internal migration.

There are four spatial patterns of internal migration:

1. Rural-rural migration: in many poor countries like Senegal, rural-rural migration occurs when labourers from poorer regions travel to agriculturally-rich and irrigated areas that have more work.
2. Rural-urban migration: seen in the urbanizing economies of Asia, migration of poor agricultural workers move to larger cities and manufacturing centers.
3. Urban-rural migration: migration that occurs when individuals retire back to their villages. Often, migrants who return bring back skill sets that benefit their home areas tremendously.
4. Urban-urban migration: as the predominant form of internal migration, this movement takes place from the centre of towns to the outer areas of the town.

Circular migration, the temporary and repetitive movement of a migrant worker between home and host areas, can occur both internally and transnationally.

== Foreign worker quotas ==
Some countries regulate the absolute number of foreign workers admitted on an annual basis. For instance, each year, the United States stipulates fixed numbers of H1-B visas for specialized workers and H2-A visas for non-agricultural workers. Likewise, Japan and South Korea set annual quotas for the admission of foreign workers.

In 2005, economist Ivan Png, then a nominated Member of Parliament, proposed that the government of Singapore stipulate the number of foreign workers to admit and then auction the rights to employ the foreign workers. The government rejected the proposal as artificial and not meeting social objectives.

In 2012–2014, economists Giovanni Peri (University of California, Davis), Pia Orrenius (Federal Reserve Bank of Dallas) and Madeline Zavodny (Agness Scott College) suggested reforming the allocation of H1B and H2A visas from a lottery to an auction. Subsequently, the auction mechanism was elaborated. However, Ray Marshall (University of Texas, Austin) critiqued the auction of rights to employ foreign workers.

When the government of Hong Kong announced a new scheme to admit 20,000 migrant workers for the construction, aviation, and bus transport industries, Png suggested that the government allocate the rights to admit workers by auction.

== See also ==
- Body Shops
- Bracero program (historical American guest-worker program)
- Dekasegi
- Dirty, dangerous and demeaning
- Economic migrant
- Environmental racism
- Exploitation of labour
- Global labor arbitrage
- Farmworker
- Feminization of migration
- Global mobility
- Harvest of Shame, 1960 television documentary presented by Edward R. Murrow
- Hobo, typically restricted to late-19th and early-20th century trainhopping in North America.
- Human Security
- Immigration
- Internal migration
- Itinerant
- Labor shortage
- Labour inspectorate
- Lavoie v. Canada (a Canadian Supreme Court case ruling on foreign worker status)
- Mercenary
- Mexican Americans
- Migrant domestic workers
- Migrant domestic workers in Lebanon
- Migrant education
- Migrant Housing Act of North Carolina
- Migrant prostitution
- Migrant Workers (Supplementary Provisions) Convention, 1975
- Migrant workers in the Gulf region
- Opposition to immigration
- Queer Migration
- Remittance
- Schengen Agreement (an EU agreement to open borders)
- Smart contract: can be used for temporary employment contracts
- Sweatshop
- Third Country National
- United Nations Convention on the Protection of the Rights of All Migrant Workers and Members of Their Families
- Unreported employment
- Wage slavery
- Work permit

== Notes ==
=== References ===
- Priya Deshingkar & Sven Grimm (2005). Internal Migration and Development: a Global Perspective (PDF). Vol. 19. International Organization for Migration. Archived from the original (PDF) on 20 June 2010.
- Espenshade, Thomas J. (1995). "Unauthorized immigration to the United States". Annual Review of Sociology. 21 (1): 195–216. doi:10.1146/annurev.soc.21.1.195. JSTOR 2083409. PMID 12291061.
- Friedland, William H.; Nelkin, Dorothy (1971). Migrant Agricultural Workers in America's Northeast. New York: Holt, Rinehart and Winston. ISBN 978-0-03-086706-4.
- Hanson, Gordon H. (2006). "Illegal migration from Mexico to the United States". Journal of Economic Literature. 44 (4): 869–924. CiteSeerX 10.1.1.77.5215. doi:10.1257/jel.44.4.869. JSTOR 30032389. S2CID 145485291.
- Lowe, Christian (14 January 2009). "Financial crisis hits migrant workers in Russia". New York Times. Archived from the original on 7 February 2017.
- Menjívar, Cecilia (1999). "The intersection of work and gender: Central American immigrant women and employment in California". American Behavioral Scientist. 42 (4): 601–627. doi:10.1177/00027649921954381. S2CID 144108646.
- Lycklama à Nijeholt, Geertje (1980). On the Road for Work: Migratory Workers on the East Coast of the United States. Boston: Martinus Nijhoff Publishing. ISBN 978-0-89838-043-9.
- de Parle, Jason (22 April 2007). "A good provider is one who leaves". New York Times. Archived from the original on 12 March 2017.
- Schob, David E. (1975). Hired Hands and Plowboys: Farm Labor in the Midwest, 1815–60. Chicago: University of Illinois Press. ISBN 978-0-252-00509-1.
- "United Nations Convention on the Protection of the Rights of All Migrant Workers and Members of Their Families". United Nations. Archived from the original on 15 August 2019.
- Wang Zhenghua (21 September 2005). "Convicted migrant worker killer waits for final verdict". China Daily. Archived from the original on 12 October 2008.
- Wright, Gavin (2003). "Slavery and American agriculture history" (PDF). Agricultural History. 77 (4): 527–552. doi:10.1525/ah.2003.77.4.527. S2CID 154395674. Archived (PDF) from the original on 26 April 2012.
- Taran, Patrick (2011). "Globalization, Migration and Labour: Imperatives for a Rights Based Policy". Journal of Globalization Studies. 2 (1): 58–77. Archived from the original on 16 January 2015.
