= Foreign worker legislation in South Korea =

Like most countries, South Korea has legislation on foreign and migrant workers. As industrialization advanced in the 1980s and a shortage of low-skilled workers emerged, the question of foreign and emigrant workers increased. Since the 1990s, in response to growing labor shortages, foreign workers may be hired as industrial trainees for a limited period, and are covered by health and safety regulations and insurance systems. The current Employment Permit System for workers from specified countries was introduced in 2004, despite opposition from employers, and since then the system has been extended to more types of enterprise and the periods of validity have been increased.

== Industrial technology training system ==
Through the 1988 Seoul Olympics, South Korea sought to raise its profile as an economic power and a serious international player. But these efforts had a strong impact on domestic politics and the pursuit of democratization and international relations. The Seoul Olympic Games accelerated economic development, particularly the shortage of manpower in the manufacturing industry. In response to the growing labor shortage, the government referred to the technology trainee system in Japan, and introduced an industrial technology training system. Since 1993, small and medium-sized enterprises (SMEs) have expanded their system to allow foreigners to be hired as trainees for a period of one-year extension to the initial one year employment for SMEs employing 10 to 300 workers.

After the implementation of the industrial technology training system, wages were low and safety measures on site were not sufficient, causing many industrial accidents. To solve these problems, the government enacted the Guidelines for the Protection and Management of Foreign Industrial Trainees to solve the problems, and trainees' industrial accident insurance and national health insurance were introduced. In 1998, trainees received training for two years, received a recommendation from a company that received training, and a training employment system that gave them the qualification to work for one year if they passed the prescribed test. In 2002, the original training period was shortened to one year, and on the contrary, the period of employment after training was extended to two years.

== Employment permit system ==
In the mid-1990s, there was a move to abolish the trainee system and implement an 'Employment Permit System' to officially introduce foreign workers in low-skilled fields. But the move was not realized due to opposition by industry. The largest beneficiary of the industrial trainee system and the largest opposition to the introduction of the Employment Permit System was the Small and Medium Business Administration. In addition to being able to hire trainees at low cost, companies affiliated with the Federation of Small and Medium Businesses also had problems with the recruitment, recruitment, training, and follow-up management of trainees, as well as the National Federation of Small and Medium Business. There was concern that the expenses required for entry such as rain, departure fee, return deposit, and the like were charged unfairly. In addition, it was pointed out that the deposit that was held when the trainees left the training site is the benefit of the Federation of Small Businesses.

But to solve the problems of the mid- to long-term population decrease and the potential growth rate, the serious labor shortage of SMEs and the problem of serious training system, the necessity of introduction of Employment Permit System was raised. The Employment Permit System was enacted on 17 August 2004. The existing industrial trainee system was implemented in parallel with the Employment Permit System until 2006, and was incorporated into the Employment Permit System from 1 January 2007. It is possible to extend the employment permit system up to three years with the principle of one year. These regulations are set in terms of preventing the settlement of foreign workers and ensuring that foreign workers have sufficient time to achieve their economic objectives. In addition, the trainee system has caused various problems such as unfair claim of brokerage fees due to involvement of private institutions in the process of introduction of trainees. In the Employment Permit System, a Memorandum of understanding was signed between the countries that send foreign workers and Korea, Intervention was excluded.

The Employment Permit System has been extended to 15 countries at the time of the enforcement of the Employment Permit System in 2004. Workers, mainly from Central and South-East Asia, are allowed to fill low-paid jobs in small and medium-sized enterprises which are not filled by Korean workers. This has reduced the number of illegal workers and, due to the prevention and combating of corruption in the public service, the EPS program was awarded first place in the UN Public Service Award in 2011. However, it is still criticized for being too employer-friendly, for not allowing the worker to change employer and not paying severance pay until they return home. The industry also started in 2004 in the manufacturing, construction and enrichment industries, and expanded to include fisheries and some services as of 2014. Also, in the early stage of the stay, the short-term circulation change was strictly observed based on the three-year stay period, but it was gradually extended due to the skilled manpower of foreign manpower. If a company applies for a re-entry permit for a foreign worker who meets the requirements of the foreign worker whose stay of 1 year and 10 months expires in the past three years after the establishment of the Special Reduplicate Exemption System for Seniors in February 2012, Later, they allowed re-entry and employment. In this case, they may stay for another 4 years and 10 months only once, and as a result they may stay for a total of 9 years and 8 months.
