= Remittances to Nepal =

Money transfers by Nepalese workers

Remittances to Nepal are money transfers from Nepalese workers employed outside the country to friends or relatives in Nepal and form part of the wider global remittance transfers by migrant workers back to their home countries. Remittances constitute a substantial economic pillar for Nepal. In 2023, these inward transfers were valued at an estimated US$11 billion, contributing a significant 26.6% to the nation's gross domestic product. This surpasses the aggregate inflow from both official development assistance and foreign direct investment, underscoring the critical role of remittances in Nepal's economic landscape.

It is said that remittances represented more than 20 percent of GDP in Nepal in the year 2017 onwards. Moreover, it would be highly beneficial to the country, where there are natural calamities, political conflict, people war, low investment in entrepreneurial activities and economic recession. In the financial year (FY) 2000/01, the banking sector showed that NPR 15.9 billion was received.

Remittances to Nepal are facilitated by numerous remittance companies operating through global partner networks.

== Amount ==
In 2023, Nepal's inward remittance inflows surged by 15.4% compared to the previous year, reaching a total of over $11 billion. This substantial increase underscores the significant contributions of approximately 3.5 million Nepali expats and migrant workers who remit a substantial portion of their earnings to support families back home.

== Remittances Received in Nepal (Yearly) ==
Remittances have been a significant source of foreign exchange for Nepal, contributing substantially to the country's economy. The following table presents the annual remittance inflows to Nepal from 2005 to 2023, as reported by the World Bank. The data highlights the overall upward trend in remittances over the period.

Year	Total Remittances (USD Billion)
2005	$1.21
2006	$1.45
2007	$1.73
2008	$2.73
2009	$2.98
2010	$3.46
2011	$4.22
2012	$4.79
2013	$5.58
2014	$5.89
2015	$6.73
2016	$6.61
2017	$6.93
2018	$8.29
2019	$8.24
2020	$8.11
2021	$8.23
2022	$9.29
2023	$11+

== Social impact ==
According to World Bank figures, extreme poverty has declined from almost 70% to 25% in the last 15 years, and the extra billions arriving directly to Nepalese households during this period are undoubtedly part of the story, along with large-scale state investment in social sectors and infrastructure.

The social impacts of such migration are likely to be at least as profound as the financial ones, particularly with regard to family and gender relations. In some Nepalese villages, up to 90% of the young men have left, returning at most every six months. In a case that hit the Nepalese media, there were not enough men left in one particular village to carry a coffin, meaning women had to – women traditionally do not even attend funerals.

Men (and some women) who would have previously expected to spend all of their lives in one place are traveling in groups to new areas, and sexual promiscuity is one inevitable consequence. HIV appears to be significantly higher than the national average among migrants, and divorces are on the increase.

One research demonstrated two important results: (i) migration negatively affects agriculture yield, and (ii) remittance-receiving agriculture households have not demonstrated improvements in agriculture productivity despite increased household incomes. This paper recommends the need for measures to incentivize remittance-receiving agriculture households to invest in capital goods and inputs to improve agriculture productivity so that it more than compensates for the yield losses arising from labour migration.

On the positive side, it is possible that the ongoing process of women's empowerment has sped up in some parts of Nepal. Fertility has fallen by 30% in the last decade, according to the World Bank. With fewer men around, women undertake more responsibility in household and community decisions, including managing limited funds. Women's increased decision-making control is one key factor in the rapid improvement in maternal health in Nepal in the last two decades, including a halving of maternal mortality. This is despite the "brain drain" of Nepal's trained health workers from Nepalese health facilities, another classic consequence of increased migration.
