= List of government agencies of Nepal =

List of government agencies in Nepal

This is a list of agencies and departments of the federal Government of Nepal.

== Parliament ==
- Rastriya Sabha
  - Chairperson of the Rastriya Sabha
  - Deputy Chairperson of the Rastriya Sabha
  - List of current members of the Rastriya Sabha
- Pratinidhi Sabha
  - Speaker of the Pratinidhi Sabha
  - Deputy Speaker of the Pratinidhi Sabha
  - List of current members of the Pratinidhi Sabha
- Provincial assemblies of Nepal

== Executive ==
- Prime minister of Nepal
  - Office of the Prime Minister and Council of Ministers
- Council of Ministers of Nepal
- Secretary to the Government of Nepal
  - Chief Secretary of Nepal
- Civil Services of Nepal
- Provincial governments of Nepal
  - Chief minister

== Judiciary ==
- Supreme Court of Nepal
- Chief Justice of Nepal
  - List of sitting judges of the Supreme Court of Nepal
  - Supreme Court Bar Association
- High Courts of Nepal
- District Courts of Nepal

== Constitutional bodies ==
- President of Nepal
- Vice President of Nepal
- Provincial Chiefs
- Commission for the Investigation of Abuse of Authority (CIAA)
- Public Service Commission (PSC)
- National Human Rights Commission (NHRC)
- Election Commission (ECN)
- Office of the Auditor General
- National Natural Resources and Fiscal Commission
- Other Commissions
  - National Women Commission
  - National Dalit Commission
  - National Inclusion Commission
  - Indigenous Nationalities Commission
  - Madheshi Commission
  - Tharu Commission
  - Muslim Commission

== Office of the Prime Minister and Council of Ministers ==
- Department of Information
- Office of the President and Vice President
- Office of Nepal Trust
- Investment Board Nepal
- New Nepal Construction Fund
- Prime Minister's Disaster Relief Fund
- National Planning Commission (NPC)
- National Vigilance Centre
- Public Procurement Monitoring Office (PPMO)
- National Statistics Office (NSO)
- National Reconstruction Authority (NRA)
- National Natural Resources and Fiscal Commission
- Poverty Alleviation Fund

== Ministry of Finance ==
- Department of Revenue Investigation
- Department of Customs
- Inland Revenue Department
- Department of Money Laundering Investigation

=== Organizations ===
- Financial Comptroller General Office (FCGO)
- Public Debt Management Office
- Public Finance Management Training Center
- Revenue Administration Training Center

== Ministry of Energy, Water Resources and Irrigation ==
- Department of Electricity Development
- Department of Water Resources and Irrigation
- Department of Hydrology and Meteorology
- Nepal Electricity Authority
- Water and Energy Commission Secretariat
- Groundwater Resources Development Board

=== Companies ===
- Alternative Energy Promotion Center (AEPC)
- Water Resource Research and Development Centre
- Alternative Energy Promotion Centre
- Water Resource Research and Development Centre
- Vidhyut Utpadan Company Limited
- Rastriya Prasaran Grid Company Limited (RPGCL)
- Hydroelectricity Investment and Development Company Limited (HIDCL)

== Ministry of Infrastructure Development ==
- Department of Roads
- Department of Railways
- Department of Local Infrastructure Development
- Department of Urban Development and Building Construction
- Department of Transport Management
- Department of Water Supply and Sewerage Management

=== Organizations ===
- Nepal Shipping Office
- Kathmandu Valley Development Authority
- Rastriya Awas Company Limited
- Town Development Fund
- High Powered Committee for Integrated Development of the Bagmati Civilization
- International Convention Centre Development Committee
- Central Level Project Implementation Unit
- National Research Center for Building Technology
- Melamchi Water Supply Development Board
- Project Implementation Directorate
- Kathmandu Valley Water Supply Management Board
- Nepal Water Supply Corporation
- Kathmandu Upatyaka Khanepani Limited
- Rural Water Supply and Sanitation Fund Development Board
- Water Supply Tariff Fixation Commission

== Ministry of Home Affairs ==
- Department of Immigration
- Department of National ID and Civil Registration
- National Investigation Department (NID)
- Department of Criminal Assets Management
- Department of National Personnel Records
- Department of Prison Management

=== Organizations ===
- Nepal Police
- Armed Police Force (APF)
- National Disaster Risk Reduction and Management Authority
- Improper Transactions (Meter Interest) Investigation Commission, 2079

== Ministry of Law, Justice and Parliamentary Affairs ==
- Office of The Attorney General
- Nepal Law Commission

== Ministry of Information and Communication ==
- Department of Postal Service (Nepal Post)
- Department of Printing
- Department of Information Technology
- Department of Information and Broadcasting
- Nepal Telecommunications Authority
- National Information Technology Center (NITC)
- National Information Commission
- Office of Controller of Certification

=== Organizations ===
- Film Development Board
- Gorkhapatra Corporation
- Nepal Telecom
- Nepal Telecommunications Authority
- Nepal Television
- Press Council Nepal
- Radio Broadcasting Development Committee
- Rastriya Samachar Samiti (National News Agency)

== Ministry of Youth, Labour and Employment ==
- Department of Labour & Occupational Safety
- Department of Foreign Employment

=== Organization ===
- Foreign Employment Board
- National Academy foe Vocational Training
- National Youth Council, Sanothimi, Bhaktapur
- Youth and Small Entrepreneur Self Employment Fund, Kupandol, Lalitpur

== Ministry of Foreign Affairs ==
- Department of Passports, Narayanhiti, Kathmandu (website)
- Department of Consular Services, Tripureshwor, Kathmandu (website)
- Institute of Foreign Affairs Tripureshwor, Kathmandu.

== Ministry of Land Management, Cooperatives, Federal Affairs and General Administration ==
- Survey Department
- Department of Land Management and Archive
- Department of Co-operatives
- Land Management Training Centre (in Dhulikhel, Kavre)
- National Co-operative Regulatory Authority
- Land Issue Resolving Commission
- Ministry of Land Management, Cooperatives and Poverty Alleviation Office of the Problematic Cooperative Management Committee
- Co-operative Training and Research Center
- Policy Research Institute (PRI)

== Ministry of Industry, Commerce and Supplies ==
- Commerce, Supply and Consumer Protection Department
- Department of Industry
- Office of Company Registrar
- Nepal Bureau of Standards and Metrology
- Department of Mines and Geology
- Department of Cottage and Small Industries
- Department of Food Technology and Quality Control
- Special Economic Zone Auzhority
  - Special Economic Authority Zone
- Nepal Intermodal Transport Development Board
- Federation of Nepalese Chambers of Commerce and Industry (FNCCI)
  - Food Management and Trade Company Limited
- Department Institute Committee Board

There are twenty-three members of the Department Institute Committee Board:

  - Hetauda Cement Industries Limited
  - Trade and Export Promotion Center (TEPC)
  - Udayapur Cement Industries Ltd.
  - Nepal Aushadhi Limited
  - Dhauwadi Iron Company Limited
  - National Center for Productivity and Economic Development
  - Industrial District Management Limited
  - Janakpur Cigarette Factory Limited
  - Industrial Business Development Establishment
  - Nepal Orient Magnesite Pvt. Ltd
- Krishi Samagri Company Limited
  - Nepal Metal Company Limited
  - Biratnagar Jute Mills Limited
  - Butwal Yarn Factory Limited
  - Gorkhali Rubber Industries Limited
  - Himal Cement Company Ltd.
  - Nepal Transport and Warehouse Management Company Limited
  - Nepal Oil Corporation
  - Salt Trading Corporation Limited
  - Nepal Intermodal Transport Development Board
  - Industrial Management Limited (IDML)

== Ministry of Women, Children, Gender and Sexual Minorities and Social Security ==
- The Department of Women and Children
- The Central Child Welfare Board
- Social Welfare Council Nepal
- Nepal Red Cross Society

== Ministry of Health and Food Hygiene ==
- Health Insurance Board
- Department of Drug Administration (established 1979)
- Department of Ayurveda and Alternative Medicine
- Department of Health Services
- Nepal Health Research Council

== Ministry of Culture, Tourism and Civil Aviation ==
- Civil Aviation Authority of Nepal
- Department of Archaeology
- Nepal Airlines Corporation
- Language Commission
- Aviation Security Division
- Department of Tourism
- Nepal Academy
- Nepal Academy of Tourism and Hotel Management (NATHM)
- Nepal Tourism Board
- Lumbini Development Trust
- Pashupati Area Development Trust
- Extended Janakpur Development Council
- Sanskritik Sansthan, Jamal
- Hanuman Dhoka Museum
- Patan Museum
- National Museum of Nepal
- Nepal Academy of Fine Arts (NAFA)
- Nepal Academy of Music and Drama (NAMD)
- National Archives
- Tourist Police Nepal

== Ministry of Education and Sports ==
- Department of Education (DOE)
- Nepal Medical Council (NMC)
- University Grants Commission (UGC)
- Council for Technical Education and Vocational Training (CTEVT)
- National Examination Board (NEB)
- Teacher Service Commission (TSC)
- Office of the Controller of Examinations
- National Sports Council, Tripureshwor, Kathmandu
- Nepal Olympic Committee
- Nepal Scouts, Lainchaur, Kathmandu
- National Anti-Doping Agency
- फाप्ला अन्तर्राष्ट्रिय क्रिकेट मैदान तथा खेलग्राम पूर्वाधार निर्माण विकास समिति, धनगढी कैलाली।

== Ministry of Defence ==
- Nepali Army
- National Defence University

== Ministry of Agriculture, Forests and Environment ==
- Department of Environment
- Department of Forests and Soil Conservation
- Department of Plant Resources
- Department of National Parks and Wildlife Conservation
- Department of Agriculture
- Department of Livestock Services

=== Organizations ===
- Nepal Food Corporation
- Salt Trading Corporation
- Agriculture Information and Training Center
- Nepal Agricultural Research Council (NARC)
- Forest Research and Training Centre
- REDD Implementation Centre
- President Chure Terai-Madhesh Conservation Development Board
- National Lake Conservation Development Committee

== Ministry of Science, Technology and Innovation ==
- B.P. Koirala Memorial Planetarium, Observatory and Science Museum Development Board
- Nepal Academy of Science and Technology (NAST)

== See also ==
- Government of Nepal
