= Ministry of Water Supply =

Defunct government ministry of Nepal

- खानेपानी मन्त्रालय
- Emblem of Nepal

Agency overview
- Formed: 1972
- Dissolved: 13 May 2026
- Superseding agency: Ministry of Infrastructure Development
- Jurisdiction: Government of Nepal
- Headquarters: Singha Durbar, Kathmandu, Nepal
- Minister responsible: Nisha Mehta (last holder), Cabinet Minister
- Website: mows.gov.np

The Ministry of Water Supply (Nepali: खानेपानी मन्त्रालय, romanized: Khānēpānī mantrālaya) was a government ministry of Nepal that was responsible to provide effective, sustainable and quality water supply and sanitation to the people of Nepal.

On 13 May 2026, as part of an administrative overhaul by the Balen Shah administration to reduce the number of federal ministries from 22 to 18, this ministry was dissolved. Its infrastructure wing was merged with the former Ministry of Urban Development and Ministry of Physical Infrastructure and Transport to form the consolidated Ministry of Infrastructure Development.

== History ==
The Ministry was established in 1972 by the Government of Nepal as the Department of Water Supply and Sewerage under the Ministry of Water Resources. Before it became a ministry, it was working under the Ministry of Housing and Physical Planning and the Ministry of Physical Planning and Works. In 2018, under the Second Oli cabinet, the portfolio of the ministry was changed to its current form, Ministry of Water Supply.

== Organisational structure ==
The Ministry of Water Supply has several departments and subdivisions to facilitate and implement its work:

- Department of Water Supply and Sewerage Management
- Melamchi Water Supply Development Board
- Project Implementation Directorate
- Kathmandu Valley Water Supply Management Board
- Nepal Water Supply Corporation
- Kathmandu Upatyaka Khanepani Limited
- Rural Water Supply and Sanitation Fund Development Board
- Water Supply Tariff Fixation Commission

== Former Ministers of Water Supply ==
This is a list of former Ministers of Water Supply (or equivalent) since the Nepalese Constituent Assembly election in 2013:

	Name	Party	Assumed office	Left office	Portfolio
	Ministry out of operation		25 February 2014	12 October 2015	
1	Prem Bahadur Singh	Samajbadi Prajatantrik Janata Party	24 December 2015	20 July 2016	Minister for Drinking Water and Sanitation
2	Prime Minister Pushpa Kamal Dahal	Communist Party of Nepal (Maoist-Centre)	4 August 2016	19 January 2017	Minister for Water Supply and Sanitation
3	Prem Bahadur Singh	Samajbadi Prajatantrik Janata Party	19 January 2017		Minister for Water Supply and Sanitation
4	Mahendra Yadav	Nepali Congress	26 July 2017	15 February 2018	Minister for Water Supply and Sanitation
5	Bina Magar	Communist Party of Nepal (Maoist Centre) until 17 May 2018; Nepal Communist Party from 17 May 2018	16 March 2018	20 December 2020	Minister of Water Supply
6	Mani Thapa	Nepal Communist Party	25 December 2020	20 May 2021	Minister of Water Supply
7	Anil Kumar Jha	Federal Socialist Forum, Nepal	4 June 2021	22 June 2021	Minister of Water Supply
8	Uma Kanta Chaudhary	Nepali Congress	8 October 2021	26 December 2022	Minister of Water Supply
9	Abdul Khan	Janamat Party	26 December 2022	31 March 2023	Minister of Water Supply
10	Mahindra Ray Yadav	Nepal Socialist Party	31 March 2023	7 May 2023	Minister of Water Supply
11	Pradeep Yadav	People's Socialist Party	15 July 2024	9 September 2025	Minister of Water Supply
12	Nisha Mehta	Rastriya Swatantra Party	27 March 2026	13 May 2026 (last holder)	Minister of Water Supply

== See also ==
- Department of Water Supply and Sewerage Management
