= Nepal humanitarian crisis (2015–2017) =

The Nepal humanitarian crisis (2015-2017) developed owing to a lack of action following the April 2015 Nepal earthquake and its aftershocks. It was compounded by political factors as a result of the 2015 Nepal blockade. Victims of the earthquakes were still living in flimsy, temporary shelters more than a year after the initial devastation. The governmental National Reconstruction Authority had not devised relocation plans for these people as recently as July 2016. In Sindhupalchok District, the region that had suffered the worst devastation, the humanitarian situation was a little better towards the end of 2016, than it had been in 2015.

Development indicators dropped with the passage of time. Nepal had ranked among the countries that had seen remarkable development gains pre-quake; post-quake reversal of gains led to around 43% of the urban population lacking access to even a decent toilet. It has been reported that one of the primary reasons for girls dropping out or irregularly attending school was the lack of toilets.

== Announcement ==
In early November 2015, the US embassy sounded the warning of a humanitarian crisis evolving in Nepal. The issue of post-quake vulnerability somehow dissipated during the increasingly vocal information war between Kathmandu and New Delhi, which witnessed public denouncements at various United Nations offices. Soon UNICEF followed with a warning echoing statements previously made by the US embassy.

== Ethnic Angle ==
The most ignored communities were Nepali Indians, living in the most inaccessible regions of Nepal, clinging to high mountain passes. They have yet to see any quake aid from Kathmandu, while the relief effort focuses on the immediate needs of people in the vicinity of cities. The areas of Nepal hardest-hit by the earthquake, such as Gorkha District, Sindhupalchowk District, and Dolakha District, where 90% of houses were destroyed, are likely to suffer most as Kathmandu historically has shown very little interest in them, and transport must be by mule in treacherous mountainous terrain as no roads exist. In particular, Tamang and Chepang children were already suffering from severe malnutrition before the fuel crisis, and they were worst off. Having waited until winter is in full swing, the government in Kathmandu, finally gearing for action in December, realized that it could not efficiently deliver supplies to remote locations without helicopters. By Christmas 2015, snow had already fallen in many parts of the country.

1/3 of all deaths were among Tamang people, and roughly 2/3 of the 600,000 structures completely destroyed were in Tamang dominant areas. It is the poverty, neglect and outright discrimination against Tamangs that makes them even more vulnerable to disasters like earthquakes, landslides and floods—Anthropologist Mukta Singh Lama.

In total, an estimated 600,000 homes were destroyed in the earthquake (with no donated money reaching any survivors as of 9 November). These and similar predominately Mongoloid groups that inhabit high mountain homelands are known to international tourists and trekkers through trekking circuits, where the experiences of them sharing their homes and hospitality are an integral part of the trekking experience. However, these very same people are the most vulnerable within Nepal due to their remoteness, post-quake effects, weak political representation, low caste, and the altitude and climate. Goma BK of the Gagal Bhadaure Village Development Committee(VDC)-9, Ramechhap, said that she was unable to get find one kilogram of rice or one tarpaulin even after walking four hours daily for six days. Rajendra Nepali of Bhimeshwor Municipality-6, Dolakha, said that Dalits were excluded during the relief effort because their settlements are located in remote areas and lack access to information.

== Humanitarian access ==
Political leaders did not lose their houses, and they have their warm homes in Kathmandu. Only the poor like us suffer like this. They cannot feel our pain unless they spend a night in our shelter.—Quake survivor Rani Mhendo Tamang from Haku village.

Humanitarian access to survivors has been lacking, other than the UNHAS air drops, as the government had seized ad-hoc post-quake efforts and resources within the month after the initial quake. This situation did not improve even with the new government of KP Oli in October. Only after widespread criticism and warnings of impending doom did the government break the logjam and appoint the reconstruction authority head on 25 December, who now has the task of racing against time to begin reconstruction.

== Crisis Intensification ==
=== Winter Onset ===
Despite the first politically unified government since before the Nepalese Civil War, no action has been taken in the month since Cabinet endorsed an action plan for releasing grant assistance meant for houses destroyed by the 25 April earthquake. On 26 November, some 600 children in Gorkha District were diagnosed with malnutrition.

We are alive so far. But I do not know if we will still be alive when it starts snowing after a few weeks. We have a choice to either suffocate in the smoke or freeze in the cold.—Quake survivor Karbo Tamang from Haku village.

In a normal winter the prior year, without quakes or fuel shortages, an estimated 5,000 children died from pneumonia exacerbated by indoor pollution from firewood used to keep warm. These numbers were expected to rise sharply in the winter of 2015. While long-promised legal traction in preparation for assistance has materialized, the first 2,000 families to receive money they can put to immediate use, collected it on 20 December from the Nepal Red Cross for emergency clothing and food. Many complained it is not enough to buy clothes for the entire family let alone any food. As the problems compound, some 3,300 people have been diagnosed with tuberculosis in the west as of 25 December, a region not affected by the quake. In a twist of irony, on 28 December, an ignored and very irritated group of quake survivors sent the Nepali government warm clothes as a symbolic protest. The UN Humanitarian Air Service (UNHAS) of copters, coordinated by the World Food Programme, has made 4,784 sorties in the eight months to remote areas. This has stopped for lack of funds, with the last delivery made on 31 December just as the worst of winter cold sets in, and confirmation of disease and death from lack of food in villages makes headlines in earnest. The first 3 billion rupees was released by the Kathmandu government for warm clothing on 3 January 2016, according to the Ministry of Home Affairs.

Despite an about turn regarding quake relief by the central government of Nepal around Christmas and early January 2016, and one Army led relief to push into remote Gorkha during a blizzard, only one out of four villages received aid as helicopters had trouble landing. The Oli government began selling donated food meant for victims to raise money, instead of delivering the goods to survivors. This move was criticized by the independent Nepal Human Rights Commission. Additionally, the official launch of the reconstruction campaign resembled a religious ceremony rather than a relief mission.

Additionally, even in the Madhesh plains town of Pokariya, which has a well-connected infrastructure compared to the Himalayas, some 26 people have died in two months, with major news outlets failing to report this. Some 400 health facilities were damaged or destroyed in the quake-hit mountain region. As of mid-February 2016, only one had been restored to operation, by an NGO not the government.

=== Ongoing Issues ===
Despite the first government relief actions and commitments, serious hurdles in execution] exist. The quake has not only destroyed homes but livelihoods. According to a news report, every needy family across the quake-hit Gorkha District seeking out a living with traditional occupations finds itself in the same kind of predicament—the quake has destroyed their means of livelihood. Once self-sufficient communities have become entirely dependent on aid for survival, extreme depression (mood) is setting in.

People are just not living well after the disastrous post-quake post-blockade winter. Stress-induced insomnia has become commonplace and chronic and that is wreaking social havoc. Water scarcity has hit 2.8 million people and over 5,200 drinking water projects. As of March 2016, some 325 water sources in 14 districts have gone dry.

== Reconstruction obstruction ==
The NRA should not regulate but facilitate, what we need now is quick decision-making.— Kenichi Yokoyama, Nepal Director of the Asian Development Bank (in response to March 2016 NRA notice)

In a brief notice in early March 2016, the National Reconstruction Authority (NRA) directed all relief agencies to stop reconstructing private homes destroyed or damaged in the earthquake for the 2.5 million survivors, without its approval. Although the intentions finally appeared humanitarian this time as to bring the ad hoc relief agencies into oversight, the timing (a year late and after the brutal winter) had rendered a swift and brutal reaction from relief agencies. Infighting between political parties had already led to the extended and bitterly cruel delay in NRA setup, along with the willful misleading of survivors regarding money to rebuild, and timeliness that only worsened the humanitarian situation, with no government clarification on this. Although the NRA issued a ban, it is clear that NGOs are not waiting, nor is the agency seriously seeking to stop them, as an NRA spokesperson stated: "We don’t mean to stop INGOs and NGOs from reconstruction projects, just to bring them under our jurisdiction." The agency's response has been that they are understaffed and ministries are not cooperating nor attending their meetings.

== International reactions ==
United States – On 5 November 2015, the US expressed deep concern over the critical shortages of essential supplies in Nepal resulting from a volatile situation along the Nepal-India border.

United Nations – On 26 November 2015, United Nations Development Programme resident senior economist Basudeb Guha-Khasnobis stated: "What could have been transient poverty is turning out to be structural poverty due to delay in reconstruction works."

United Nations UNICEF – On 30 November, UNICEF stated – "More than 3 million children under the age of 5 in Nepal are at risk of death or disease during the harsh winter months due to a severe shortage of fuel, food, medicines and vaccines."

United Nations World Food Programme – On 11 December, UN WFP stated – "Major disruptions in food and fuel imports across its southern border with India have severely affected Nepal’s supplies and caused a worrying increase in food prices."

== See also ==
- Madhes Movement
- Anti-Indian sentiment
- Human rights in Nepal
