= Ministry of Physical Infrastructure and Transport =

Defunct government ministry of Nepal

- भौतिक पूर्वाधार तथा यातायात मन्त्रालय
- Emblem of Nepal

Agency overview
- Formed: 2000
- Preceding agency: Ministry of Physical Planning and Works
- Dissolved: 13 May 2026
- Superseding agency: Ministry of Infrastructure Development
- Jurisdiction: Government of Nepal
- Headquarters: Singha Durbar, Kathmandu, Nepal
- Minister responsible: Sunil Lamsal, Cabinet Minister (last holder)
- Agency executive: Keshav Kumar Sharma, Secretary
- Website: www.mopit.gov.np

Ministry of Physical Infrastructure and Transport (Nepali: भौतिक पूर्वाधार तथा यातायात मन्त्रालय) was the governmental body of Nepal responsible for domestic transport, rail transport, and waterways.

On 13 May 2026, as part of an administrative overhaul by the Balen Shah administration to reduce the number of federal ministries from 22 to 18, this ministry was dissolved. Its functions were merged with the former Ministry of Urban Development and Ministry of Water Supply to form the consolidated Ministry of Infrastructure Development.

== Organisational structure ==
Until its dissolution in 2026, the ministry dealt with domestic transport including road and rail transportation as well as waterways, while air transportation was overseen by the Ministry of Culture, Tourism and Civil Aviation.

The ministry's former departments included:

Department	Current Oversight (Post-2026)
Nepal Shipping Office	Ministry of Infrastructure Development
Department of Roads	Ministry of Infrastructure Development
Department of Transport Management	Ministry of Infrastructure Development
Department of Railways	Ministry of Infrastructure Development

== See also ==
- Ministry of Infrastructure Development (Successor)
- Department of Roads
- Department of Railways
