= Nepal Rajpatra =

Government gazette of Nepal

- Type: Government gazette
- Publisher: Department of Printing, Government of Nepal
- Founded: 6 August 1951
- Language: Nepali
- City: Kathmandu
- Country: Nepal
- Website: rajpatra.dop.gov.np

Nepal Rajpatra (Nepali: नेपाल राजपत्र, literally "Nepal Gazette") is the official gazette of the Government of Nepal . It is published by the Department of Printing, a department under the Ministry of Communication and Information Technology of Nepal assigned with the responsibilities of printing on behalf of the government.

Nepal Citizenship (Second Amendment) bill, published in Nepal Rajpatra, 2082 B.S.

It serves as the authoritative public journal used to publish official government notices, laws, bills, acts, rules, cabinet decisions, treaties, executive orders, and national declarations.

== See also ==
- List of government gazettes
- Government gazette
