= Nepal Building Codes =

Nepal Building Codes (NBC) are a set of a technical documents developed by The Department of Urban Development and Building Construction under the Ministry of Physical Planning and Works of Nepal. The codes were first drafted in 1993–1994 and were adopted in 2003. It was included in the gazette in 2006. Adherence to the NBC is mandatory in all municipalities and some rural municipalities in Nepal. Prior to the promulgation of the NBC, various codes (e.g. Indian, British, American) were used in Nepal.

The NBC allow the use of any international codes and standards that meet the minimum requirements of the NBC. Some rules of thumb are also accepted in the codes. The NBC have provisions for both urban and rural buildings to make them seismically resilient.

== See also ==
- Department of Urban Development and Building Construction
