= Department of Road =

Department of Road may refer to:

- Department of Roads (Nepal), road construction authority in Nepal
- Ministry of Road Transport and Highways, ministry of road construction authority in India
- Gauteng Department of Roads and Transport, department of the transport system in the Gauteng province of South Africa
