= National Highway 53 (Nepal) =

Highway in Nepal

Swargadwari Highway स्वर्गद्वारी राजमार्ग
- राष्ट्रिय राजमार्ग ५३
- National Highway 53
- NH53 in red

Route information
- Maintained by MoPIT (Department of Roads)
- Length: 127.92 km (79.49 mi)
- History: F013

Major junctions
- North end: Darbot
- Libang
- Sourh end: Bhalubang

Location
- Country: Nepal
- Provinces: Lumbini Province
- Districts: Dang District, Pyuthan District, Rolpa District

Highway system
- Roads in Nepal
← NH52	→ NH54

National Highway 53, NH53 is a national highway in Nepal located in Lumbini Province of Nepal. The total length of the highway is 127.92 kilometres (79.49 mi). Feeder road F013 was converted and upgraded into NH53.

Three to four hundred vehicles daily use the road from Bhalubang in Dang to Pyuthan Khalanga and Rolpa Libang to Darbot. 40 million Nepali Rupees budget has been allocated for the financial year 2081/082 in the Bhaluwang-Chakchake section of the Bhaluwang-Liwang-Madichour-Darbot road under the Highway Upgrades and Rehabilitation Program.
