= Inarwa Phulbariya =

Former Village Development Committee in Nepal

Inarwa Phulbariya इनर्वा फुलवरीया
- Settlement in Khadak Municipality
- Location in Nepal
- Coordinates: 26.59°N 86.62°E
- Country: Nepal
- Zone: Sagarmatha Zone
- Region: Eastern Development Region
- Province: Madhesh Province
- District: Saptari District
- Municipality: Khadak Municipality
- Ward: 10

Population (2011)
  - Total: 5,403
- Time zone: UTC+5:45 (NST)
- Postal code: 56414
- Website: khadakmun.gov.np

Inarwa Phulbariya (Nepali: इनर्वा फुलवरीया) is a settlement in Ward 10 of Khadak Municipality, located in Saptari District, Sagarmatha Zone, in southeastern Nepal. It was previously a Village Development Committee (VDC) before the administrative restructuring in 2016, when it became part of Khadak Municipality. According to the 2011 Nepal Census, Inarwa Phulbariya had a population of 5,403 people, residing in 1,027 individual households.
