= Ministry of Infrastructure Development (Nepal) =

Federal Ministry of Nepal

- पूर्वाधार विकास मन्त्रालय
- Emblem of Nepal

Ministry overview
- Formed: 13 May 2026; 4 months ago
- Preceding agencies: Ministry of Physical Infrastructure and Transport; Ministry of Urban Development; Ministry of Water Supply
- Jurisdiction: Government of Nepal
- Headquarters: Singha Durbar, Kathmandu
- Minister responsible: Sunil Lamsal, Cabinet Minister
- Website: Ministry of Infrastructure Development

The Ministry of Infrastructure Development (Nepali: पूर्वाधार विकास मन्त्रालय) is a federal ministry of Nepal established on 13 May, 2026. This ministry is responsible for planning, implementation and oversight of the nation's large scale physical assets including road networks, transport systems and urban facilities.

The ministry was established under the administration of Balendra Shah-led government after approval of Nepal Government (Work Division) Regulations, 2083. The ministry was formed through the merger of formerly separate Ministry of Physical Infrastructure and Transport and the Ministry of Urban Development alongside the absorption of Water Infrastructure wing from the dissolved Ministry of Water Supply.

== Organization ==
=== Departments ===
- Department of Local Infrastructure Development
- Department of Railways
- Department of Roads
- Department of Urban Development and Building Construction
- Department of Water Supply and Sewerage Management
- Department of Transport Management
