= Nepal Telecommunications Authority =

Telecommunications regulator in Nepal

Nepal Telecommunications Authority नेपाल दूरसञ्चार प्राधिकरण
- Abbreviation: NTA
- Formation: 4 March 1998 (28 years ago)
- Type: Statutory Authority
- Legal status: Created by Telecommunication Act 1997
- Purpose: Independent regulator
- Headquarters: Kathmandu, Nepal
- Region served: Nepal
- Key people: Arjun Ghimire (Chairman)
- Website: www.nta.gov.np

Nepal Telecommunications Authority (Nepali: नेपाल दूरसञ्‍चार प्राधिकरण; NTA) is the Telecommunications regulatory body of Nepal. It is an autonomous body established in February 1998 in accordance with Telecommunications Act, 1997 and Telecommunications Regulation, 1998. The NTA is responsible for regulating all matters related to telecommunications (wireless, cellular, satellite and cable) of Nepal.

The then Government of Nepal's on 25 December 1995 (2052/09/10 BS) decided to welcome private sector into the telecommunication sector in the country. This decision of the cabinet was meant to be a liberalization policy in the ICT for development. The mission of NTA is to create the optimum conditions for the development of telecommunications sector in Nepal by serving the public interest in terms of quality, choice and value for money; healthy competition among service providers and the nation in its drive for socio-economic advancement through efficient private sector participation.

NTA today publicize the MIS (Management information system) report periodically, usually monthly, as a process to inform citizen of the telecom statistics in the country. NTA published a Cross Holding Study report that suggested all telecom companies in Nepal to go public limited company (PLC). While this decision of January 2014 has welcomed more foreign investment in the telecom sector in the country, it has also promulgated more laws and regulations of the same.
