= Ministry of Urban Development (Nepal) =

Government ministry of Nepal

- Emblem of Nepal

Agency overview
- Dissolved: 13 May 2026
- Superseding agency: Ministry of Infrastructure Development
- Jurisdiction: Government of Nepal
- Headquarters: Singha Durbar, Kathmandu
- Minister responsible: Sunil Lamsal (last holder), Cabinet Minister
- Agency executive: Gopal Sigdel, Secretary
- Website: moud.gov.np

The Ministry of Urban Development (Nepali: सहरी विकास मन्त्रालय) was the government ministry of Nepal responsible for the development of urban areas in the country until its merger with the Ministry of Physical Infrastructure and Transport to form the Ministry of Infrastructure Development on 13 May 2026.

== Organisational structure ==
The Ministry of Urban Development had several departments and subdivisions to facilitate and implement its work:

=== Departments ===
- Department of Urban Development and Building Construction
- Department of Local Infrasctructure

=== Organizations ===
- Kathmandu Valley Development Authority
- Rastriya Awas Company Limited
- Town Development Fund
- High Powered Committee for Integrated Development of the Bagmati Civilization
- International Convention Centre Development Committee
- Central Level Project Implementation Unit
- National Research Center for Building Technology

== List of Ministers of Urban Development ==
This is a list of former Ministers of Urban Development since the Nepalese Constituent Assembly election in 2013:

S. No	Name	Party	Assumed office	Left office
1.	Narayan Khadka	Nepali Congress	25 February 2014	10 October 2015
Ministry out of operation			12 October 2015	4 August 2016
2.	Arjun Narasingha KC	Nepali Congress	26 August 2016	31 May 2017
3.	Prabhu Sah	Communist Party of Nepal (Maoist Centre)	7 June 2017	17 October 2017
4.	Dil Nath Giri	Rastriya Prajatantra Party Nepal	17 October 2017	1 January 2018
5.	Kamal Thapa	Rastriya Prajatantra Party Nepal	1 January 2018	14 February 2018
6.	Prime Minister Khadga Prasad Oli	Communist Party of Nepal (Unified Marxist–Leninist)	15 February 2018	17 May 2018
6.	Prime Minister Khadga Prasad Oli	Nepal Communist Party	17 May 2018	31 May 2018
7.	Mohammad Estiyak Rai	People's Socialist Party, Nepal	1 June 2018	24 December 2019
8.	Gokul Prasad Baskota	Nepal Communist Party	10 January 2020	20 February 2020
9.	Basanta Kumar Nemwang	Nepal Communist Party	20 February 2020	14 October 2020
10.	Krishna Gopal Shrestha	Nepal Communist Party	14 October 2020	25 December 2020
(3).	Prabhu Sah	Communist Party of Nepal (Unified Marxist–Leninist)	25 December 2020	20 May 2021
11.	Ram Kumari Jhakri	Communist Party of Nepal (Unified Socialist)	8 October 2021	26 June 2022
12.	Metmani Chaudhary	Communist Party of Nepal (Unified Socialist)	27 June 2022	26 December 2022
13.	Bikram Pandey	Rastriya Prajatantra Party	17 January 2023	25 February 2023
14.	Sita Gurung	Nepali Congress	31 March 2023	4 March 2024
15.	Dhan Bahadur Buda	Communist Party of Nepal (Unified Socialist)	6 March 2024	15 July 2024
16.	Prakash Man Singh	Nepali Congress	15 July 2024	9 September 2025
17.	Kul Man Ghising	Independent	15 September 2025	7 January 2026
18.	Kumar Ingnam	Independent	7 January 2026	27 March 2026
18.	Sunil Lamsal	RSP	27 March 2026	13 May 2026 (last holder)

== See also ==
- Nepal Building Codes
- Department of Urban Development and Building Construction
- Department of Local Infrasctructure
