= Kamala Kumari Parajuli =

Nepali human rights activist

Honourable Kamala Kumari Parajuli
- कमला कुमारी पराजुली

Chairperson National Women Commission
- Incumbent
- Assumed office 20 December 2020
- President: Bidya Devi Bhandari
- Prime Minister: KP Sharma Oli

Personal details
- Born: 24 July 1968 (age 57)

Kamala Kumari Parajuli (Nepali: कमला कुमारी पराजुली; born 24 July 1968) is a Nepali human rights activist and gender equality specialist who currently serves as Chairperson of the National Women Commission, one of the country's eight constitutional bodies. Appointed in December 2020 she previously worked with Sankalp, the Nepal Peace and Unity Council and the Sancharika Group.
