= Melamchi Water Supply Project =

Drinking water project in Nepal

Coordinates: 27°50′00″N 85°34′38″E

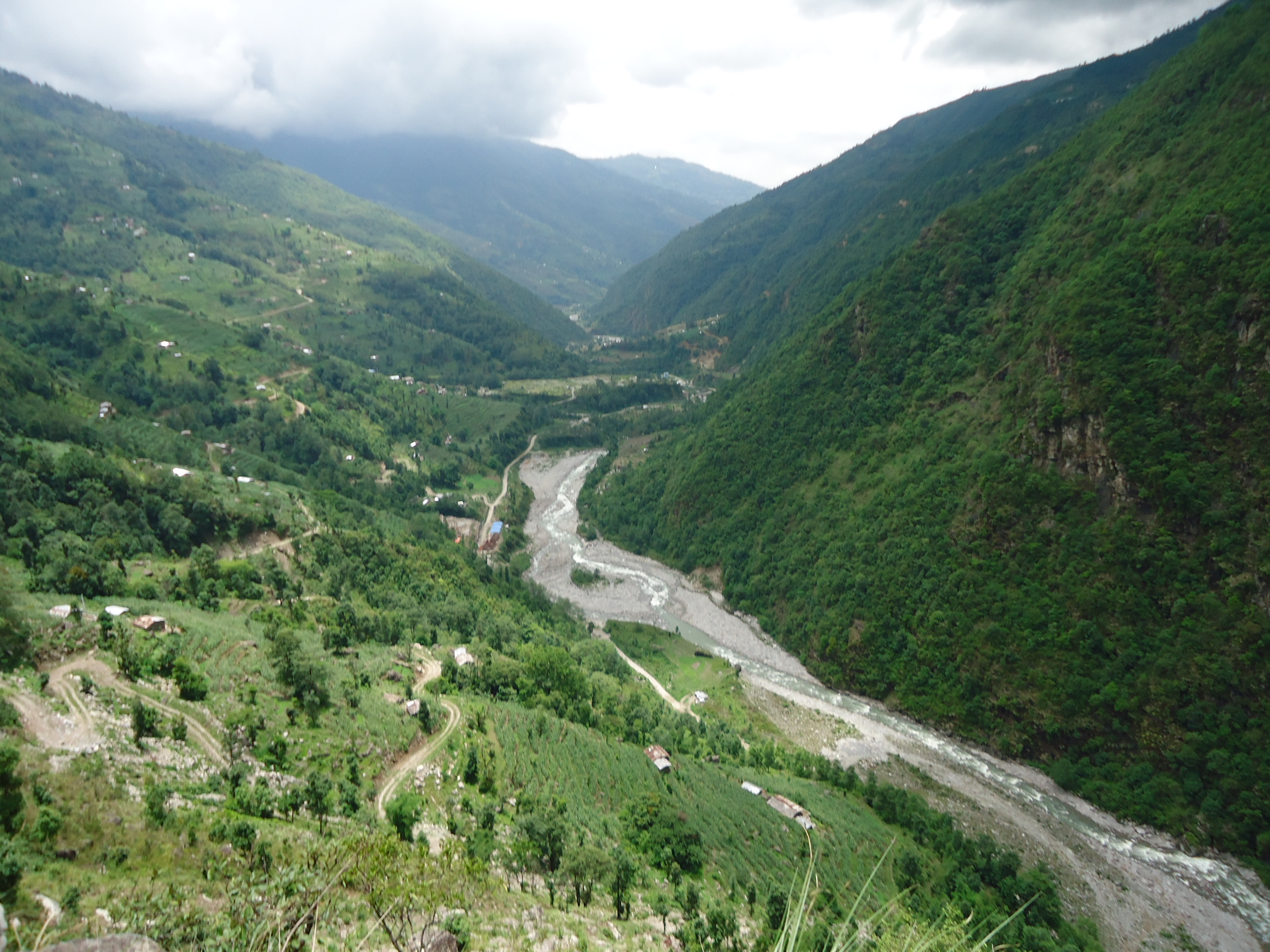
- Melamchi River
- Location: Melamchi, Bagmati Province
- Country: Nepal
- Launched: November 1998
- Closed: April-May 2021

Melamchi Water Supply Project (MWSP) is a project to supply drinking water to Kathmandu Valley by diverting 170,000,000 litres (45,000,000 US gallons) of water per day. The project started in November 1998 and completed in April 2021. The intake of this project is located in Melamchi, Nepal. Ministry of Physical Infrastructure and Transport (Nepal) is the executing agency for the Project and Melamchi Water Supply Development Board is the implementing agency.

This project was mainly financed by Japan and the Asian Development Bank. About 57% of the project cost was loan, 16% was grant and 26% was financed by the Nepalese government.

== Project description ==
The intake of the project lies in the Melamchi valley in the gorge below Ghwakan, just upstream of the confluence of Melamchi River and Ribarma Khola. The main structure is the diversion weir, river-training structures, and sediment exclusion basin. A gravity concrete weir is 5 to 7 m (16 to 23 ft) high with the crest at an elevation of 1,425 m (4,675 ft) asl. The control system and the sediment exclusion basin have a design capacity of 6 m^{3}/s (210 cu ft/s). The sediment exclusion basins are double-chambered with a length of 80 m (260 ft) each.

The tunnel intake is at an elevation of about 1,416.05 m (4,645.8 ft) and the outlet is about 1,408 m (4,619 ft) asl. The length of the tunnel from the intake to the water purification facilities in Kathmandu Valley at Sundarijal is about 26 km (16 mi). The tunnel is longest water supply tunnel of South-Asia and second longest water supply tunnel in Asia. The tunnel is being excavated from Adits at Ambathan, Gyalthum, Sindhu, and Sundarijal Waterfall. The diversion flow of 6 m^{3}/s (210 cu ft/s). The tunnel has a cross-sectional area of 12.7 m^{2} (137 sq ft) and lined with shotcrete in most of the section; concrete lining is done only in the weak rock formation. The tunnel is excavated by drill and blast method. The geology of the areas consists mainly of gneiss with mica schist and laminated quartzite.

The distribution work has nine service reservoirs at various locations in the Kathmandu (Mahankalchaur, Bansbari, Paani Pokhari, Balaju, Khumaltar, Arubari, Tigni, Katunje and Kritipur). The water from Sundarijal to Service Reservoir is supplied by a Bulk Distribution System (BDS). The distribution to households is done by a network of pipes about 670 km (420 mi) long. About 540 km (340 mi) of sewerage network will also be upgraded in this project.

== Delays ==
The project had a serious history of delays. Some are mentioned below,

- In August 2007, the ministry of physical planning, Hislia Yami, cancelled the contract awarded to UK company Severn Trent claiming that Severn Trent did not have a sufficiently strong international track record.
- In September 2012, the contract with China Railway 15 Bureau Group Corporation was terminated.
- In 2018, the deadline was extended to mid-February 2019 with CMC, the contractor.
- In 2019, the contract with Cooperativa Muratori e Cementisti di Ravenna (CMC) was terminated over payment dispute.

== Accidents ==
- 2020-July 14: During testing of the tunnel, the breaking of bulkhead gate caused flooding in the tunnel resulting in the death of two staff.
- 2021-June 15: Due to monsoon flood, the headworks of the project at Ambathan area was blocked by flood. Temporary structures such as construction camps and Bailey bridges swept away. Eight workers including three Chinese, three Indians and two Nepalis were washed away by the flood.

== Corruption ==
- In 2005, Prime Minister Sher Bahadur Deuba was charged for corruption by the Royal Corruption Control Commission. The case was terminated by the Supreme Court considering it as an unconstitutional move by King Gyanendra.
- In 2006, Sweden withdrew its funding of this project over corruption issues.
- In 2019, the contractor Cooperativa Muratori e Cementisti di Ravenna (CMC) alleged two senior Nepali bureaucrats Gajendra Kumar Thakur, a former secretary at the Water Supply Ministry, and Surya Raj Kadel, executive director of the Melamchi Water Supply Development Board asked for a cut of 3% of payment on NPR 300 million payment. This issue led CMC to break the contract with the government.

== See also ==
- Department of Water Supply and Sewerage Management
