= Department of Postal Service (Nepal) =

Statutory Body of Nepal

- हुलाक सेवा विभाग

Department overview
- Type: Agency of the Government of Nepal
- Headquarters: Dillibazar, Kathmandu, Nepal
- Department executive: Mrs. Manmaya Bhattarai Pangeni, Director General
- Parent department: Ministry of Information and Communications
- Website: nepalpost.gov.np

The Department of Postal Service is a government agency of Nepal assigned with the responsibilities of postal related all services on behalf of the Government of Nepal. DPS operates different offices General Post Office (Nepal Post), Postal Training Centre. It currently employs 17,000 employees.

Prime minister Balendra Shah set to launch Government Courier Service in collaboration with Postal Department to deliver government documents such as Driving License, Passport.

== Services ==
There are four main central offices of the postal department viz. Goswwara office, Central Dhanades Office, Philatelic and postage management office and the Postal Training Center in Kathmandu. It has regional office in Biratnagar, Pokhara, Surkhet and Doti. There are 70 district offices and 842 city post offices and 3074 small post offices run by the department. Nepal Post also has participation with the EMS system. Its major functions are to provide prompt and reliable access to letters and postal services to the Nepali People based on the prevailing laws and international treaties. In addition to this, other functions of this department are as follows:

- Manage to deliver Postal Items to the concerned on time,
- Publish postage stamps on time,
- Regular monitoring and supervision of underneath bodies.
- Management of Employees as per the authority given by law,
- Coordinating and collaborating with international postal organizations such as the Universal Postal Union (UPU), and Asia-Pacific Postal Union (APPU) and to provide cross-border service of Nepal Post.
- Taking necessary initiatives to further modify and strengthen Nepal's postal service in accordance with international provisions related to postal services.

== See more ==
- Postal codes in Nepal
