= Department of Transport Management =

Department of Government of Nepal

- यातायात व्यवस्था विभाग

Department overview
- Formed: 2041 BS
- Type: Transport management
- Jurisdiction: Government of Nepal
- Status: Active
- Headquarters: Baneshwor, Kathmandu, Nepal
- Employees: 800 +
- Director General responsible: Rajib Pokhrel
- Parent department: Ministry of Infrastructure Development
- Website: dotm.gov.np

Department of Transport Management (DoTM) (Nepali: यातायात व्यवस्था विभाग) under Ministry of Infrastructure Development is the authority for regulating domestic transport, managing vehicle registrations, issuing driver's licenses, granting route permits, and ensuring road safety across the country. Established in 2041 B.S. (c. 1984–1985 A.D.), the department operates under the framework established by the Vehicle and Transport Management Act, 2049 B.S. and the Vehicle and Transport Management Rules, 2054 B.S.

Following Nepal's federal structure, the central department handles policy, national transport regulation, and centralized smart driving license printing, while regional/field offices (Transport Management Offices / Yatayat Byabastha Karyalaya) are managed under the respective Provincial Ministries of Physical Infrastructure Development.

All the Transport Management Offices are listed below:

Office name	Location		Services	Website
Office name	City	District	Services	Website
Bagmati Province
TMO Ekantakuna	Lalitpur	Lalitpur	Driving License (Trials/Biometrics) & Four-wheeler/Commercial Vehicle Registration	link
TMO Chabahil	Chabahil	Kathmandu	Driving License (Written exam, Biometrics, Trials)	link
TMO Thulobharyang	Thulobhryang	Kathmandu	Driving License (Written exam, Biometrics, Trials)	link
TMO Gurjudhara	Gurjudhara	Kathmandu	Vehicle Registration, Tax Collection & Renewal (Two-wheelers & Heavy Vehicles)	link
TMO Radhe Radhe	Radhe Radhe	Bhaktapur	Driving License (Written exam, Biometrics, Trials)	link
TMO Banepa	Banepa	Kavrepalanchok	Transport Management Services	link
TMO Hetauda	Hetauda	Makwanpur	Combined Vehicle Registration & Driving License Services	link
TMO Khurkot	Khurkot	Sindhuli		
TMO Bharatpur	Bharatpur	Chitwan	Combined Vehicle Registration & Driving License Services	link
Koshi Province
TMO Biratnagar	Biratnagar	Morang	Vehicle Registration & Tax Services	link
TMO Itahari	Itahari	Sunsari	Driving License Services	link
TMO Gaighat	Udayapur			
TMO Birtamod	Birtamod	Jhapa	Vehicle & License Services	link
TMO Okhaldhunga	Rumjatar	Okhaldunga	Regional / Field Services	
TMO Dhankuta	Dhankuta	Dhankuta	Regional / Field Services	link
TMO Ilam	Ilam	Ilam	Regional / Field Services	link
Madhesh Province
TMO Jnakpurdham	Janakpur	Dhanusha	Vehicle Registration & Driving License Services	link
TMO Lahan	Lahan	Siraha	Vehicle & License Services	link
TMO Gaur	Gaur	Rautahat		
TMO Birgunj	Birgunj	Parsa	Vehicle Registration, Customs-related Transport & License Services	link
TMO Kalaiya	Kalaiya	Bara	Vehicle & License Services	link
TMO Rajbiraj	Rajbiraj	Saptari	Vehicle & License Services	link
TMO Malangawa	Malangwa	Sarlahi		
TMO Bardibas	Bardibas	Mahottari	Transport Management Services	link
Gandaki Province
TMO Pokhara	Pokhara	Kaski	Separate dedicated Vehicle Registration & Driving License Offices	link
TMO Nawalpur	Nawalpur	Nawalpur		
TMO Baglung	Baglung	Baglung	Regional Transport Services	link
TMO Dumre	Dumre	Tanahu	Transport Management Services	link
Lumbini Province
TMO Butwal	Butwal	Rupandehi	Vehicle Registration & Driving License Service	link
TMO Nawalparasi	Parasi	Nawalparasi		
TMO Tulsipur	Ghorahi	Dang	Vehicle & License Services	link
TMO Nepalgunj	Nepalgunj	Banke	Vehicle & License Services	link
TMO Palpa	Tansen	Palpa	Regional Transport Services	link
Karnali Province
TMO Birandranagar	Birendranagar	Surkhet	Vehicle Registration & Driving License Services	link
TMO Jumla	Jumla	Jumla	Regional Transport Services	link
TMO Chaurjhari	Chaurjahari	West Rukum	Transport Management Services	link
Sudurpashchim Province
TMO Dhangadi	Dhangadi	Kailali	Vehicle Registration & Driving License Services	link
TMO Mahendranagar	Mahendranagar	Kanchanpur	Vehicle & License Services	link
TMO Dadeldhura	Dadeldhura	Dadeldhura	Regional Transport Services	link
TMO Dipayal	Doti			

== See also ==
- Department of Roads
- Department of Local Infrastructure
- Department of Urban Development and Building Construction
