= National Reconstruction Authority (Nepal) =

- राष्ट्रिय पुनर्निर्माण प्राधिकरण

Agency overview
- Formed: 25 December 2015
- Jurisdiction: Nepal
- Headquarters: Singha Durbar, Kathmandu, Nepal
- Annual budget: NPR 145.93 billion (2017/18)
- Agency executive: Sushil Gyewali, CEO
- Parent agency: Government of Nepal
- Key document: The Reconstruction of the Earthquake Affected Structures Act, 2072
- Website: http://nra.gov.np

The National Reconstruction Authority is a government agency of Nepal that coordinates reconstruction following the April 2015 Nepal earthquake.

== History ==
The National Reconstruction Authority was formed in August 2015 by the Government of Nepal under Prime Minister Sushil Koirala. However, it was dissolved again, due to the government's failure to present a replacement bill. The National Reconstruction Authority was then established again on 25 December 2015, exactly eight months after the devastating earthquake in Nepal.

The objectives of the NRA, as articulated in the National Reconstruction Policy are: (1) To reconstruct, retrofit and restore partially- and completely-damaged residential, community and government buildings and heritage sites, to make them disaster-resistant using local technologies as needed; (2) To reconstruct (restore) damaged cities and ancient villages to their original form, while improving the resilience of the structures; (3) To build resilience among people and communities at risk in the earthquake affected districts; (4) To develop new opportunities by revitalizing the productive sector for economic opportunities and livelihoods; (5) To study and research the science of earthquakes, their impact including damages and effects, and post-earthquake recovery, including reconstruction, resettlement, rehabilitation and disaster risk reduction; and (6) To resettle the affected communities by identifying appropriate sites.

== Structure ==
The Prime Minister of Nepal has a crucial role in designing the work of the agency, as he and the chairman of the parliamentary opposition will chair the Directive Committee and Advisory Council under which the National Reconstruction Authority works. The earthquake-affected districts also have a representative each in the governing bodies of the agency. The agency works closely with several ministries of Nepal, most prominently the Ministry of Urban Development, the Ministry of Education, the Ministry of Federal Affairs and Local Development and the Ministry of Culture, Tourism and Civil Aviation.

== Challenges ==
Geographic location, culture, political instability, and socioeconomic conditions contribute to slow recovery from the 2015 Gorkha Earthquake. Severe weather conditions, isolation of many affected villages, lack of government preparedness to recover, and difficulties of accepting and sending reconstruction supplies made the recovery process harder.

== Other Reconstruction Works ==
The National Reconstruction Authority was also mandated by the Government to overview reconstruction works that follow the 2017 South Asian floods

== Criticism ==
There has been criticism regarding the National Reconstruction Authority, as they are said to be hindering the reconstruction process.
