= Nepal Post =

Statutory Body of Nepal

- नेपाल पाेष्ट/गाेश्वारा हुलाक कार्यालय

Department overview
- Formed: 1878
- Type: Agency of the Government of Nepal
- Headquarters: Dillibazar Kathmandu, Nepal
- Department executive: Mrs. Dal Bahadur GC, Chief Post Master
- Parent department: Department of Postal Service; Ministry of Information and Communications
- Website: www.gpo.gov.np

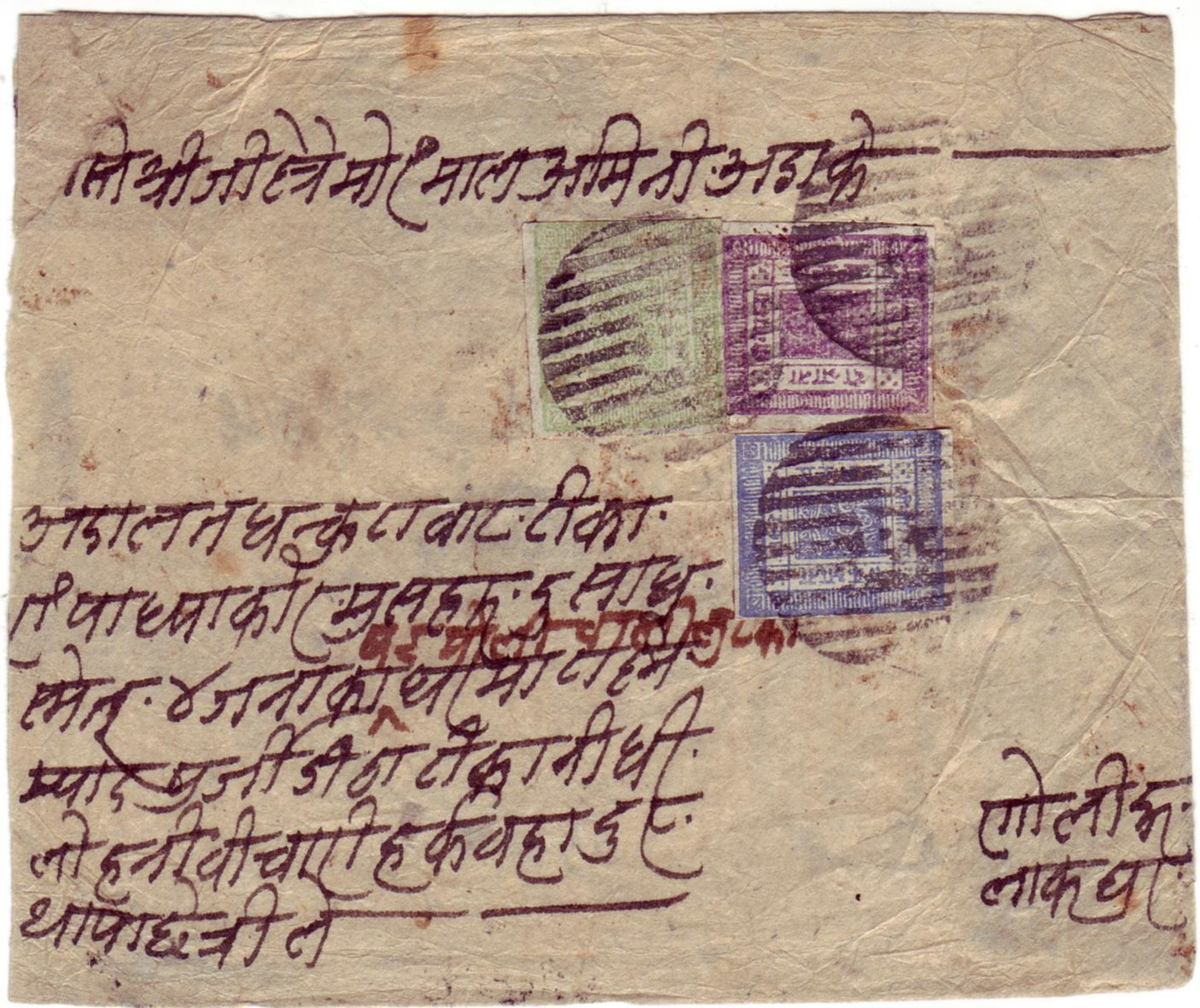
The first stamps of Nepal on cover, 1881.

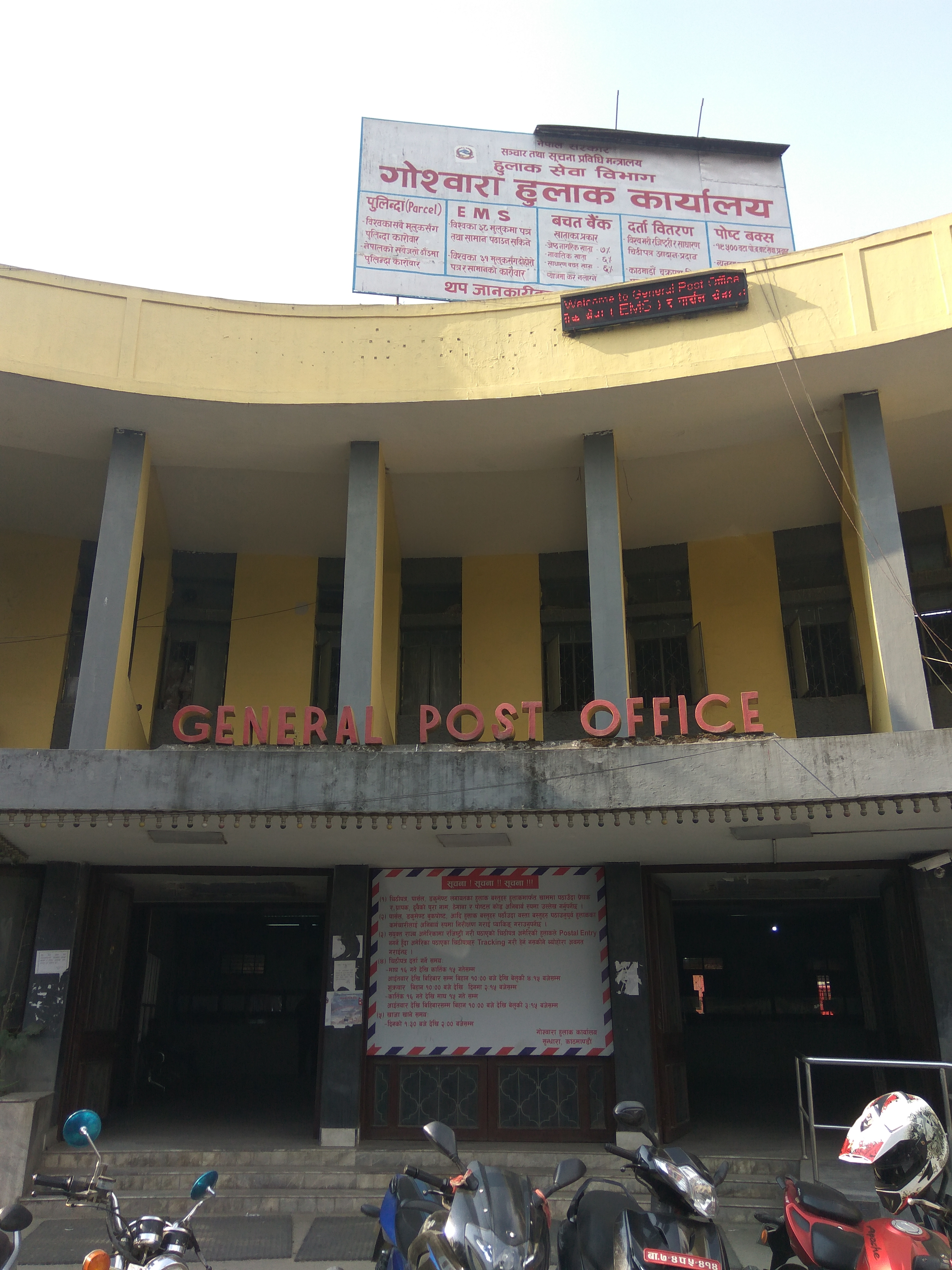
Headquarter of Nepal Government Postal Services Department

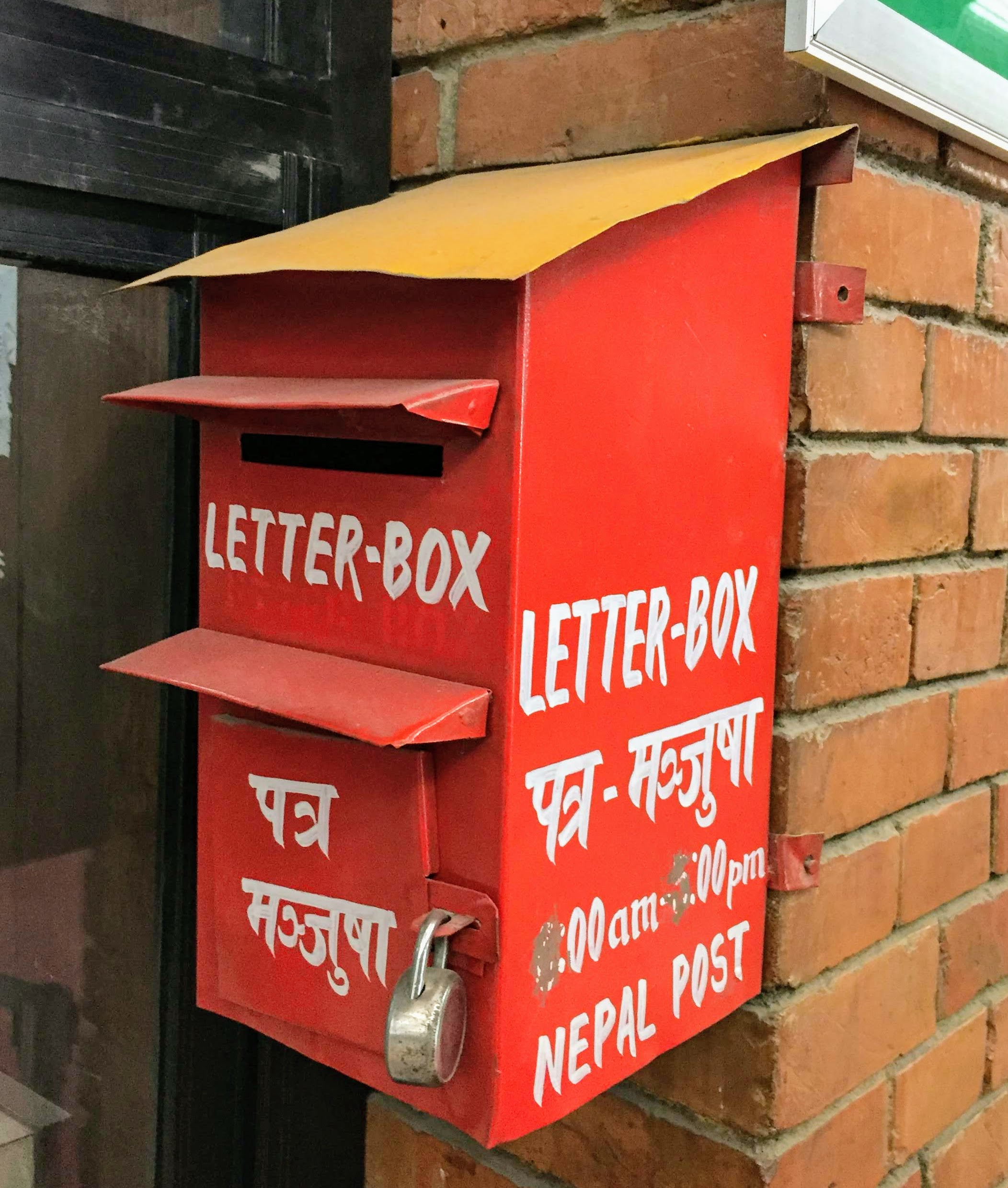
A postbox of Nepal Post at Tribhuvan International Airport, Kathmandu, Nepal

Nepal Post also known as General Post (Nepali: नेपाल हुलाक/गाेश्वारा हुलाक) is a government operated postal Service in Nepal under Department of Postal Service, which comes under Ministry of Information and Communications and the national post office of Nepal. Nepal Post became a member of the Universal Postal Union on 11 October 1956.

== See also ==
- Postage stamps and postal history of Nepal
