= Survey Department (Nepal) =

- नापी विभाग

Department overview
- Formed: 2009 AD
- Type: Surveying, Map making and NeLIS
- Jurisdiction: Government of Nepal
- Status: Active
- Headquarters: Minbhawan, Kathmandu, Nepal
- Annual budget: Nrs 2.924 Billion (FY 2081/82)
- Director General responsible: Prakash Joshi
- Parent department: Ministry of Land Management, Cooperatives and Poverty Alleviation
- Website: www.dos.gov.np

Survey Department (Nepali: नापी विभाग) under Ministry of Land Management, Cooperatives and Poverty Alleviation is the authority for design, develop and operate systems for collecting and analyzing spatial information about the manmade features in Nepal. It aims to collect data from all the areas of Nepal and develop horizontal and vertical control points.

== History ==
In 2009, the Government of Nepal dissolved all Survey Goswara Offices and transferred to all corresponding district survey offices. The survey offices are categorized into 5 types.

== Organization ==
The department is headed by officers of Nepal Engineering Service (Survey).
