= Department of Printing (Nepal) =

Department of Government of Nepal

- मुद्रण विभाग

Agency overview
- Formed: 1992
- Preceding agency: Department of Printing and Publication
- Jurisdiction: Nepal
- Headquarters: Singha Durbar, Kathmandu, Nepal
- Minister responsible: Minister of Information and Communications
- Agency executive: Balabhadra Giri, Director General
- Parent agency: Ministry of Information and Communications, Government of Nepal
- Website: www.dop.gov.np

The Department of Printing is a government agency of Nepal assigned with the responsibilities of printing on behalf of the Government of Nepal. Since 2008, the department publishes the national Government gazette of Nepal, Nepal Gazette. Since 2016, the department also publishes online versions of the gazette on its website, making more than 120,000 copies of the Nepal Gazette published between 1951 and 2014 available to the public. Furthermore it offers security printing services including printing Nepali Citizenship Certificates or Certificates of educational institutions.

== History ==
In 1851, the first printing press was introduced to Nepal brought by Prime Minister Jung Bahadur Rana. The first governmental newspaper, Gorkhapatra, was printed from 1901 on by the Government of Nepal. That press was transformed into a governmental department, the Printing and Publication Department of Nepal in 1989. The last change so far was in 1992, when the department was renamed to the Department of Printing. In February 2017, the department proposed to also print Nepalese banknotes, which are currently not printed in Nepal.
