= National Dalit Commission =

Nepali constitutional body

The National Dalit Commission is a Nepali constitutional body established with a view to provide safeguards against the exploitation of Dalits to promote and protect their social, educational, economic and cultural interests, special provisions were made in the Constitution. About 20 per cent of Nepal's population are Dalit.

== History ==
The first Commission for Dalits was set up in 1963 and caste-based discrimination was abolished in Nepal. The Interim Constitution of Nepal provides for freedom of religion and permits the practice of all religious groups; however, there are some restrictions. The Interim Parliament declared the country a secular state in the Interim Constitution in January 2007. The Interim Constitution maintains the stipulation from the 1990 constitution that no one can be discriminated against based on caste. In 2002 the previous government constituted a National Dalit Commission charged with protecting and promoting Dalit (formerly called "untouchable") rights and ensuring active participation of the Dalit community in the development of the country. Before the People's Movement in April 2006, which led to removal of the King and his government, the Commission devised legal and policy arrangements for Dalit rights, made recommendations to implement international conventions to which the country is a party, monitored and coordinated non-governmental organizations (NGOs) on efforts to uplift Dalits, and launched programs on social awareness to end social discrimination and untouchability. After the success of the People's Movement, many members of the Commission were accused of being royalist and resigned, and the Commission was unable to function. The Interim Government nominated 16 members to the Commission on June 3, 2007. Later, the Caste Based Discrimination and Untouchability Act was passed in 2011.

=== Restrictions on religious freedom ===
The Constitution prohibits discrimination on the basis of caste; however, the caste system strongly influences society. While the Government has stressed that caste-based discrimination is illegal and temple access for "lower castes" has improved in some areas, caste discrimination was frequently practiced at Hindu temples, where Dalits were forbidden from entering by some Hindu priests.

=== Societal abuses and discrimination ===
Although such discrimination is prohibited by the Constitution, the caste system strongly influenced society. Societal discrimination against members of lower castes and Dalits remained widespread despite the Government's efforts to protect the rights of disadvantaged castes. Lower castes also experienced discrimination in many other areas of life, including education, employment, and marriage. Other religious communities did not practice caste discrimination. Entrance into many Hindu temples was often restricted for persons not of South Asian ethnicity, who are unlikely to be Hindu.

On April 11, 2007, the Ministry of Education and Sports reported that Dalit students in Parbat District had been refused admission to the high school completion examination based on their caste. The Ministry said it would take action against those involved; however, at the end of the reporting period, the Ministry had not done so.

On March 4, 2007, more than 100 Dalit families were forced to leave their village in Rautahat District after a clash between a Dalit and a higher caste individual during a religious festival. The families returned to their village on March 8 after police, human rights activists, and Dalit organizations intervened.

In October 2006 a Dalit family in Doti District was banished from its community because family members refused to play music (their traditional role) during a Hindu religious celebration. The family took refuge in a neighboring village.

== See also ==
- Freedom of religion in Nepal
