= Department of Foreign Employment =

Government agency of Nepal

- वैदेशिक रोजगार विभाग

Department overview
- Formed: 31 December 2008
- Type: Foreign Labour
- Jurisdiction: Government of Nepal
- Status: Active
- Headquarters: Tahachal, Kathmandu, Nepal; <!27.720°N 85.335°E>
- Annual budget: (FY 2081/82)
- Director General responsible: Mira Acharya
- Parent department: Ministry of Youth, Labour and Employment
- Website: https://dofe.gov.np

The Department of Foreign Employment is a government agency under the Ministry of Youth, Labour and Employment responsible for supporting the development of workers for foreign employment. Its functions include providing workers with skills and knowledge based on international labour market requirements and promoting safe, organised and dignified foreign employment. The department was established under the Foreign Employment Act, 2007.

== Objectives‍‍ ==
The department's objectives include promoting international employment opportunities, developing skilled workers, simplifying foreign employment procedures, and ensuring worker safety during pre-departure, employment and reintegration. It also aims to protect women migrant workers, promote good governance, strengthen cooperation, and encourage the productive use of remittances.

== Major tasks ==
The Foreign Employment Act, 2007 and Foreign Employment Rules, 2008 require workers to complete procedures including pre-approval, biometric enrolment, welfare-fund registration, medical examination and obtaining a labour permit before departing for foreign employment. The department administers these procedures and provides related services to prospective migrant workers. The process consists of 10 steps before departure. The department's major functions include pre-approval of vacancies, biometric enrolment, welfare-fund contributions, medical examinations, pre-departure orientation and the issuance of labour permits. It also conducts special screening under the Employment Permit System (EPS) for semi-skilled employment in South Korea.

The department also provides legal protection to citizens engaged in foreign employment and takes action against manpower agencies and individuals who violate applicable laws.

== Divisions ==
- Relief and Rescue Division
- G2G Facilitation and Relief Division
- Employment Permission System (EPS) Division
- Foreign Employment Labour Permission Section
- Case and Investment Division

== Network and Activities ==
- Foreign Employment Board
- EPS Korea Section
