= Sanskritik Sansthan =

Nepali cultural organisation

Sanskritik Sansthan (Cultural Corporation of Nepal)
- सांस्कृतिक संस्थान
- Official logo of Sanskritik Sansthan
- Predecessor: Rastriya Nachghar (National Dance Theatre)
- Formation: 1972; 54 years ago
- Founder: Government of Nepal
- Type: Government-owned cultural institution
- Legal status: Active
- Headquarters: Jamal, Kathmandu
- Location: Kathmandu, Nepal
- Region served: Nepal
- Official language: Nepali
- Owner: Government of Nepal
- Secretary General: Kiran Babu Pun
- Parent organization: Ministry of Culture, Tourism and Civil Aviation
- Website: www.sanskritiksansthan.gov.np

Sanskritik Sansthan (Nepali: सांस्कृतिक संस्थान,The Cultural Corporation of Nepal) is a government-owned cultural institution in Nepal. It was established to support the preservation, promotion and presentation of Nepali culture and performing arts. The institution traces its origins to the Rastriya Nachghar (National Dance Theatre), which was established in 2016 BS. Under the Communication Corporation Act, 2028 BS, the institution was reorganized and renamed as Sanskritik Sansthan ( the Cultural Corporation) on 5 Ashar 2029 BS. Kiran Babu Pun is the current Secretary of the Sanskritik Sansthan(Cultural Corporation of Nepal).

== History ==
Sanskritik Sansthan (The Cultural Corporation of Nepal), also known as the Rastriya Nachghar (National Theatre), developed from an institution established to promote and develop the performing arts in Nepal. Rastriya Nachghar was established in 1959 BS as a venue for theatre, music and other performing arts.

In 2029 BS, the institution was reorganized as Sanskritik Sansthan with the objective of contributing to the institutional development and promotion of Nepali culture. Since its reorganization, the institution has organized and presented cultural program featuring Nepalese folk traditions, music, dance and theatre. Its activities have included cultural program held during national events, ceremonies, festivals and other special occasions, as well as cultural presentations representing Nepal at national and international events.

The Management Committee of Sanskritik Sansthan consists of the following positions:

1. Chairperson:- Appointed by the Government of Nepal.
2. General Manager:- Appointed by the Government of Nepal.
3. Member:- A representative of the Ministry of Culture, Tourism and Civil Aviation at the rank of Under Secretary.
4. Member:- A representative of the Ministry of Finance at the rank of Under Secretary.
5. Member:- Appointed by the Government of Nepal.

Sanskritik Sansthan is a government-owned cultural institution operating under the Government of Nepal.

== List of General Managers ==
The following individuals have served as General Managers of Sanskritik Sansthan:

1. Indra Prasad Kafle
2. Narayan Gopal Guruvacharya
3. Ganesh Rasik
4. Ramesh Tamrakar
5. Narayan Bhakta Shrestha
6. Harihar Sharma
7. Laxman Rayamajhi
8. Bhupal Rai
9. Naresh Poudel
10. Shalik Ram Timilsina
11. Rajesh Thapa
12. Ashok Kumar Rai
13. Kiran Babu Pun - currently in office

== Programs ==
- "shubharambha Sanskritik Sajha 2081" by Sanskritik Sansthan (Rastriya Nachghar). The event was addressed by the former Prime Minister of Nepal Pushpa Kamal Dahal (Prachanda)
- “Shorna Mahotsav” was organized by Sanskritik Sansthan (Rastriya Nachghar) to commemorate its 50th anniversary. The event was addressed by the former President of Nepal, Bidya Devi Bhandari
- “Shubharambha Sanskritik Saajh 2082” was organized by Sanskritik Sansthan in collaboration with the Department of National ID and Civil Registration.
- "Rastriya Dhori Git Partiyogita 2083" was organized by Sanskritik Sansthan
