= Department of Local Infrastructure Development =

Department of Government of Nepal

- स्थानीय पूर्वाधार विकास विभाग

Department overview
- Jurisdiction: Nepal
- Headquarters: Shree Mahal, Pulchowk (Lalitpur)
- Employees: 165
- Annual budget: NRs 27.29 Billion (FY 2081/82)
- Minister responsible: Ashok Kumar Sah, Director General
- Parent Department: Ministry of Infrastructure Development
- Website: https://www.doli.gov.np

The Department of Local Infrastructure Development (DoLID), is a department under the Ministry of Infrastructure Development of Nepal, responsible for assisting local governments in the engineering aspects of civil engineering construction including rural, urban and agriculture road/bridge construction and mentinance. It has its branch offices.

== History ==
Department of Local Infrastructure Development and Agricultural Road (DoLIDAR) was established in 2055 BS under Ministry of Local Development and Administration. It was later moved to Ministry of Urban Development and renamed as Department of Local Infrastructure. The department now falls under Ministry of Infrastructure Development after the merging of two ministries in 2026.

== Organization ==
The department is run by officers of Nepal Engineering Service (Civil/General). Under the department, there are 370 technical officers running the department and its branch offices. There are 15 branch offices, namely:

Supervision and Monitoring Office (7)	Divisional offices (21)
Infrastructure Supervision and Monitoring Office, Itahari	Infrastructure Development Division (Panchthar, Dhankutta, Okhaldhunga, Illam)
Infrastructure Supervision and Monitoring Office, Janakpur	Infrastructure Development Division (Siraha, Parsa)
Infrastructure Supervision and Monitoring Office, Hetauda	Infrastructure Development Division (Ramechhap, Sindhupalchowk, Nuwakot, Lalitpur)
Infrastructure Supervision and Monitoring Office, Pokhara	Infrastructure Development Division (Gorkha, Tanahun, Myagdi)
Infrastructure Supervision and Monitoring Office, Butwal	Infrastructure Development Division (Banke, Gulmi, Rolpa)
Infrastructure Supervision and Monitoring Office, Surkhet	Infrastructure Development Division (Jajarkot, Jumla, Mugu)
Infrastructure Supervision and Monitoring Office, Dhangadhi	Infrastructure Development Division (Baitadi, Achham)

- Suspension Bridge Division - 1
- Rural Connectivity Improvement Project - 1
- Provincial and Local Roads Improvement Program - 1

== See also ==
- Department of Roads
- Department of Urban Development and Building Construction
- Department of Railways
