= Salt Trading Corporation =

- Website: http://www.stcnepal.com

Salt Trading Corporation (STC) is a Nepalese company founded in 1963 for the purpose of regularising the distribution primarily of salt but also sugar, wheat, oil, rice, other grains, tea, LP gas, paper, coal and tyres for vehicles.
