= Agricultural road =

Type of road for agriculture

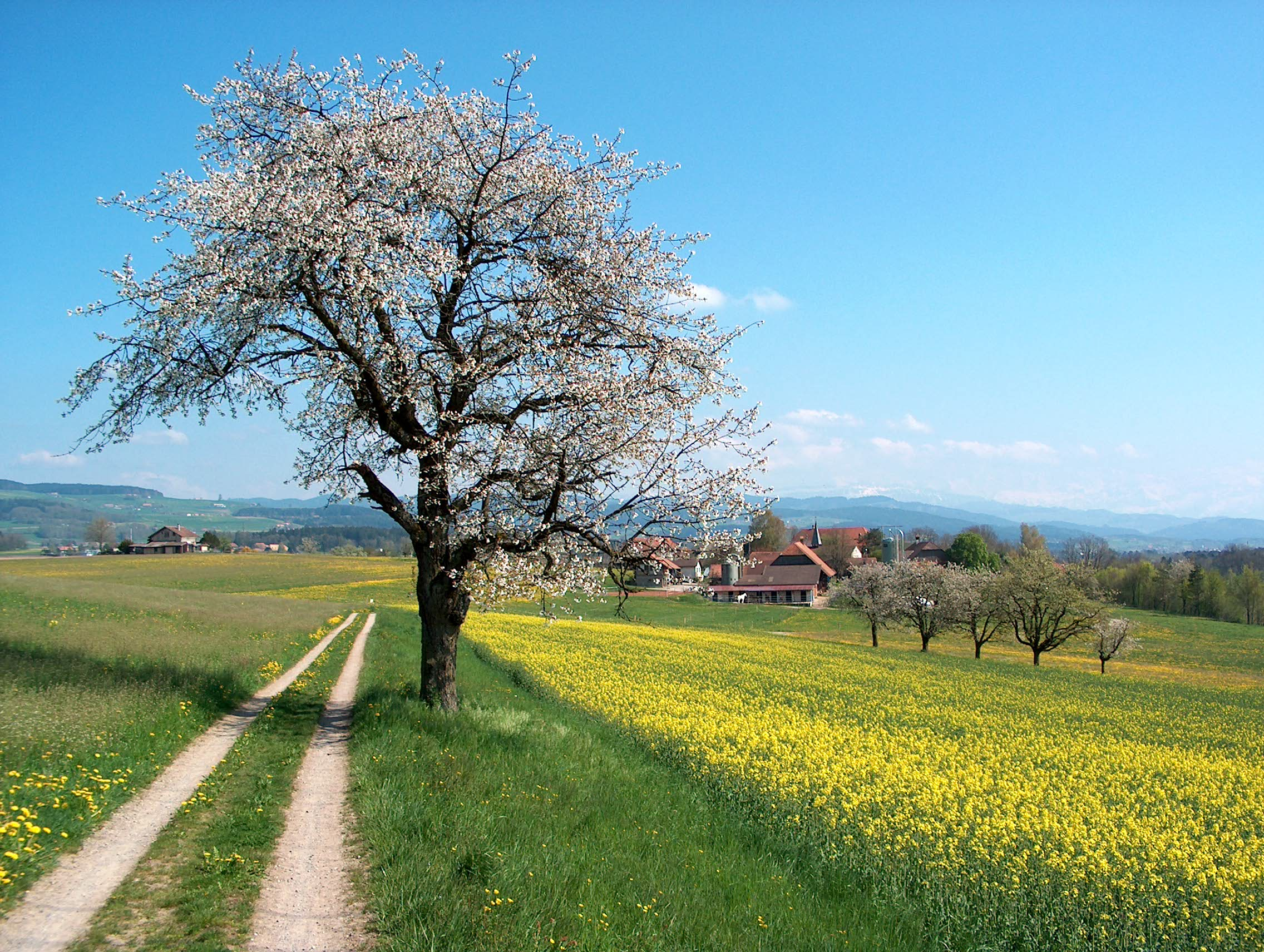
Agricultural road in Switzerland

An agricultural road or farm track is a service road that serves predominantly agricultural or forestry purposes and has only local significance. Agricultural roads are typically unpaved dirt roads or covered with gravel, but in some cases asphalt roads are agricultural roads.

In the United States, a "farm-to-market road" or "ranch-to-market road" (sometimes "farm road" or "ranch road" for short) is a state road or county road that connects rural or agricultural areas to market towns.

== See also ==
- Forest road
