= Postal codes in Nepal =

Read This First: Nepal has updated its postal code system in 2025 to align with the country’s federal structure, moving away from the system implemented in 1991. The new postal codes are designed to reflect the administrative changes (provinces and updated local units/palikas). You should refer to the Department of Postal Services for the latest codes. Here's the link: https://gpo.gov.np/pages/postal-code-1259614658/

link:https://postcodenepal.com

The codes below are outdated and not in use anymore.

Postal codes in Nepal are five digit numbers used by Nepal Postal Service, The postal code system was implemented in November 1991 by the Department of Posts. The first two numbers represent the District, and the last three digits the post office or APO area.

== Postal Codes Of Nepal With District And Post Office ==
District	Post Office	Postal Code
Achham	Achham	10700
	Chaurpati	10701
	Srikot	10702
	Thanti	10703
	Mellekh	10704
	Bayalpata	10705
	Bhatakatiya	10706
	Jayagadh	10707
	Kalagaun	10709
	Kuchikot	10710
	Kamal bazar	10711
	Dhakari	10712
	Turmakhad	10713
Arghakhanchi	Arghakhanchi	32700
	Balkot	32701
	Arghatosh	32702
	Khana	32703
	Wangla	32704
	Hamshapur	32705
	Thada	32706
	Khilji	32708
	Khidim	32709
	Pali	32710
	Dhikura	32711
	Argha	32712
	Subarnakhal	32713
Baglung	Baglung	33300
	Pala	33302
	Bihukot	33303
	Harichaur	33304
	Balewa Payupata	33305
	Jaidi Belbagar	33306
	Bereng	33307
	Galkot	33308
	Pandavkhani	33309
	Arnakot	33310
	Khrwang	33311
	Bongadovan	33312
	Jhimpa	33313
	Kusmi Shera	33314
Baitadi	Baitadi	10200
	Kesharpur	10201
	Patan	10202
	Khodpe	10203
	Mulkhatali	10204
	Gajari Changgad	10205
	Dehimandau	10207
	Sharmali	10209
	Srikot	10210
	Dilasaini	10211
	Swopana Taladehi	10212
	Purchaudihat	10213
	Sitad	10214
	Dhungad	10215
Bajhang	Bajhang	10500
	Talkot	10501
	Jamatola	10502
	Jaya Prithivi Nagar	10505
	Chhanna	10506
	Chaudhari	10507
	Rayal	10508
	Thalara	10509
	Bungal	10510
	Shayadi	10511
Bajura	Bajura	10600
	Dandakot	10602
	Jukot	10603
	Faiti	10604
	Kolti	10605
	Manakot	10606
	Dogadi	10607
	Tate	10608
	Chhatara	10609
Banke	Banke	21900
	Suiya	21901
	Bhojbhagawanpur	21902
	Khaskusma	21903
	Kohalapur	21904
	Ramjha	21905
	Udayapur	21907
	Chisapani	21910
	Godahana	21911
	Jayaspur	21912
	Khajura	21913
	Chandranagar	21914
Bara	Bara	44400
	Nijgadh	44401
	Mahendra Adarsha	44402
	Simraungadh	44403
	Umjan	44404
	Bariyarpur	44405
	Kabahigoth	44406
	Dumarwana	44408
	Pipradhigoth	44410
	Basantapur	44411
	Simara	44412
	Parsoni	44413
	Amalekhgunj	44416
	Jeetpur (Bhavanipur)	44417
Bardiya	Bardiya	21800
	Jamuni	21801
	Mainapokhar	21802
	Motipur	21803
	Magaragadi	21804
	Baganaha	21808
	Bhurigaun	21809
	Rajapur	21811
	Pashupatinagar	21813
	Sanoshri	21814
Bhaktapur	Bhaktapur	44800
	Duwakot	44802
	Kharipati	44804
	Tathali	44805
	Jorpati	44806
	Gamcha	44809
	Dibyashwori	44810
	Thimi	44811
	Nagarkot	44812
Bhojpur	Bhojpur	57000
	Kulung Agrakhe	57001
	Dingla	57002
	Deurali	57003
	Pyauli	57004
	Yaku	57005
	Bastim	57006
	Timma	57008
	Dilpa Annapurna	57009
	Bhulke	57010
	Baikunthe	57011
	Ranibas	57012
	Walangkha	57013
	Tiwari Bhanjyang	57014
	Dobhane	57015
Chitawan	Chitwan	44200
	Ratnanagar	44204
	Mugling	44206
	Narayangadh	44207
	Rampur	44209
	Soshi Bazar	44212
	Harinagar	44213
	Madi	44214
	Bhandara	44202
	Khairahani	44203
	Jutpani	44205
	Phulbari	44208
	Meghauli	44210
	Patihani	44211
Dadeldhura	Dadeldhura	10300
	Ugratara	10302
	Dandaban	10303
	Ganeshpur	10304
	Gaira Ganesh	10305
	Jogbudha	10306
	Lamikande	10307
	Chipur	10308
	Ajayameru	10309
Dailekh	Dailekh	21600
	Gaidabaj	21602
	Naumule	21603
	Byastada	21604
	Dhungeshwor	21605
	Malika	21607
	Dullu	21608
	Jambu Kandha	21609
	Rakam Karnali	21610
Dang	Dang	22400
	Hapur	22402
	Jumlepani	22403
	Bhaluwang	22404
	Koilabas	22405
	Jangrahawa	22406
	Rampur	22407
	Urahari	22408
	Hekuli	22409
	Panchakule	22410
	Shantinagar	22411
	Tulsipur	22412
	Manpur	22413
	Lamahi	22414
	Ghorahi	22415
Darchula	Darchula	10100
	Rapla	10101
	Duhuti	10102
	Malikarjun	10104
	Joljibi	10105
	Dandakot	10106
	Ritha Chaupata	10107
	Gokule	10108
	Sitola	10109
	Marmalatinath	10110
	Sipti	10111
Dhading	Dhading	45100
	Lapa	45101
	Sertung	45102
	Phulkharka	45103
	Tripureshwor	45104
	Katunje	45105
	Sunkhani	45106
	Sunaulabazar	45108
	Maidi	45109
	Khanikhola	45110
	Bhumisthan	45111
	Gajuri	45112
	Malekhu	45113
Dhankuta	Dhankuta	56800
	Mudhebash	56801
	Rajarani	56802
	Dandabazar	56803
	Bhedetar	56804
	Ankhisalla	56805
	Hile	56806
	Muga	56807
	Teliya	56808
	Pakhribash	56809
	Leguwa	56810
	Mare Katahare	56811
	Arknaule	56812
	Chungmang	56813
Dhanusha	Dhanusha	45600
	Khajuri	45601
	Tinkoriya	45602
	Yadukuha	45603
	Duhabi	45604
	Chakkar	45605
	Raghunathpur	45606
	Godar Chisapani	45607
	Dhanushadham	45608
	Bagachauda	45610
	Jatahi	45611
	Phulgama	45612
	Sankhuwa Mahendranagar	45616
	Dhalkebar	45617
Dolakha	Dolakha	45500
	Khahare	45501
	Namdu	45502
	Jiri	45503
	Japhekalapani	45505
	Melung	45506
	Bhusapheda	45507
	Sunkhani	45509
	Khopachangu	45510
	Lamabagar	45511
	Chitre	45512
Dolpa	Dolpa	21400
	Juphal	21401
	Tripurakot	21402
	Liku	21403
	Sarmi	21404
	Kaigaun	21405
	Foksundo	21406
	Namdo	21407
Doti	Doti	10800
	Silgadhi	10801
	Sanagaun	10802
	Daund	10803
	Mauwa Nagardaha	10804
	Banedungrasen	10805
	Jorayal	10806
	Gadhshera	10807
	Lanakedareswor	10808
	Boktan	10809
	Byal	10810
	Mudbhara	10811
Gorkha	Gorkha	34000
	Bungkot	34002
	Manakamana	34003
	Batase	34004
	Luintel	34005
	Anapipal	34006
	Jaubari	34007
	Bhachchek	34008
	Saurpani	34009
	Ghyampesal	34010
	Aarughat	34011
	Gumda	34012
	Sirdibash	34013
Gulmi	Gulmi	32600
	Purtighat	32601
	Bharse	32602
	Chandrakot	32603
	Majuwa	32604
	Ridi	32605
	Sringa	32606
	Birabas	32607
	Wami	32609
	Ismadohali	32610
	Dhurkot	32611
	Purkotadha	32612
	Arje	32613
	Manabhak	32614
	Pipaldanda	32615
Humla	Humla	21000
	Muchu	21003
	Lali	21004
	Sarkegadh	21005
	Darma	21007
	Srinagar	21008
Ilam	Ilam	57300
	Nayabazar	57302
	Pashupatinagar	57303
	Aaitabare	57304
	Harkatebazar	57305
	Gajurmukhi	57306
	Mangal Bare	57307
	Nepaltar	57308
	Jamuna	57309
	Gitpur	57310
	Cheesa Pani Panchami	57311
	Phikal	57312
Jajarkot	Jajarkot	21500
	Dhime	21503
	Dalli	21504
	Ragda	21505
	Rokaya gaun (Limsa)	21506
	Dashera	21508
	Thalaraikar	21509
	Garkhakot	21510
	Karkigaun	21511
Jhapa	Jhapa	57200
	Baniyani	57201
	Goldhap	57202
	Chandragadhi	57203
	Birtamod	57204
	Sanishchare	57205
	Budhabare	57206
	Dhulabari	57207
	Kankarbhitta	57208
	Rajgadh	57209
	Durgapur	57210
	Jhapa	57211
	Dudhe	57212
	Shivagunj	57213
	Topagachhi	57214
	Gaurigunj	57215
	Gauradaha	57216
	Damak	57217
Jumla	Jumla	21200
	Dillichaur	21202
	Tatopani	21204
	Malikathata	21205
	Kalikakhetu	21206
	Narakot	21207
	Hatsinja	21208
	Chautha	21209
Kailal	Munuwa	10902
	Kailali	10900
	Tikapur	10901
	Dododhara	10903
	Lamki	10904
	Masuriya	10905
	Pahalmanpur	10906
	Hasuliya	10907
	Bhajani	10908
	Joshipur	10909
	Phulbari	10910
	Atariya	10911
	Chaumala	10912
	Phaltude	10914
Kalikot	Kalikot	21300
	Sanniraskot	21303
	Mehalmudi	21304
	Kotbada	21305
	Kalikot	21306
	Padamghat	21307
	Jubitha	21308
	Thirpu	21309
Kanchanpur	Kanchanpur	10400
	Krishnapur	10401
	Kalika	10402
	Punarbas	10403
	Beldadi	10404
	Pipaladi	10405
	Kanchanpur	10406
	Chandani	10407
	Airport	10409
	Suda	10410
	Jhalari	10411
Kapilbastu	Kapilbastu	32800
	Pipara	32801
	Patariya	32802
	Pakadi	32804
	Kopawa	32805
	Gotihawa	32808
	Gorusinge	32809
	Pattharkot	32810
	Thuniya	32811
	Maharajgunj	32812
	Ganeshpur	32813
	Chanauta	32814
	Krishnanagar	32815
	Shiva Raj	32816
Kaski	Kaski	33700
	Rupakot	33701
	Gagan Gaunda	33702
	Makaikhola	33703
	Majhathana	33704
	Sildujure	33705
	Nirmalpokhari	33706
	Pardibandh	33707
	Bhalam	33708
	Chapakot	33709
	Birethanti	33710
	Naudanda	33711
	Ghachok	33712
	Purunchaur	33713
Kathmandu	Kathmandu	44600
	Sankhu	44601
	Chabahil	44602
	Sundarijal	44603
	Gauchar	44604
	Dillibazar	44605
	Bansbari	44606
	Tokha Saraswati	44608
	Sachibalaya	44609
	Manmaiju	44610
	Balaju	44611
	Tribhuvan University	44613
	Kalimati	44614
	Pharping	44615
	Baluwatar	44616
	Sarbochcha Adalat	44617
	Kirtipur	44618
	Thankot	44619
	Swayambhu	44620
	Pashupati	44621
	Budhanilkantha	44622
Kaverpalanchok	Pokharinarayanshthan	45203
	Gumati Bhanjyang	45204
	Mahadevasthan	45213
	Khopasi	45216
	Kavrepalanchok	45200
	Ghartichhap	45201
	Mangaltar	45202
	Dapcha	45205
	Panauti	45209
	Banepa	45210
	Panchkhal	45212
	Phalante	45214
	Dolal Ghat	45215
Khotang	Khotang	56200
	Wakshila	56201
	Aiselukharka	56202
	Jalpa	56204
	Lamidanda	56205
	Halesi mahadevasthan	56206
	Buipa	56208
	Manebhanjyang	56209
	Sapteshworichhitapokhari	56210
	Khotang	56211
	Chisapani	56212
	Simpani	56214
Lalitpur	Lalitpur	44700
	Dhapakhel	44703
	Imadol	44705
	Darabartole	44707
	Lubhu	44708
	Godawari	44709
	Chapagaun	44710
	Gotikhel	44711
	Bhattedanda	44712
	Pyutar	44713
Lamjung	Lamjung	33600
	Maling	33602
	Sundar Bazar	33603
	Sotipasal	33604
	Kunchha	33605
	Gilung	33606
	Khudi	33607
	Phaliyasanghu	33608
	Bharate	33609
	Gaunda	33610
	Tarkughat	33611
Mahottari	Mahottari	45700
	Bardibash	45701
	Bhangaha	45702
	Loharpatti	45703
	Pipara	45704
	Matihani	45705
	Ramgopalpur	45707
	Balawa	45708
	Laxminiya	45710
	Gaushala	45711
	Shreepur	45712
	Samsi	45713
	Manara	45714
Makabanpur	Hatiya	44103
	Aambhanjyang	44104
	Manahari	44106
	Basamadi	44108
	Markhu	44113
	Makawanpur	44100
	Phaparbari	44101
	Ritha Chhatibwn	44102
	Hetauda I.A.	44107
	Palung	44110
	Bhainse	44111
	Bhimphedi	44112
Manang	Manang	33500
	Pisang	33502
	Bhakra	33503
	Mathillo Manang	33504
	Nar	33507
	Dharapani	33509
Morang	Morang	56600
	Chunimari	56601
	Rangeli	56602
	Sanischare	56603
	Urlabari	56604
	Madhumalla	56605
	Bayarban	56606
	Sorabhag	56607
	Dadarberiya	56608
	Letang	56609
	Kerabari	56610
	Haraincha	56611
	Bhaudaha	56612
	Biratnagar Bazar	56613
	Rani Sikiyahi	56614
	Jhorahat	56615
	Banigama	56616
	Bansbari	56617
Mugu	Mugu	21100
	Rowa	21102
	Pulu	21103
	Sorubarma	21105
	Rara	21106
	Sukhadhik	21107
	Gumtha	21109
	Dhainkot	21110
Mustang	Mustang	33100
	Marpha	33102
	Kagbeni	33103
	Charang	33104
	Mustang	33105
	Chhoser	33106
	Muktinath	33107
	Lete	33108
	Thak Tukuche	33109
Myagdi	Myagdi	33200
	Xyamarukot	33202
	Galeswor	33203
	Rakhu Bhagawati	33204
	Sikha	33205
	Dana	33206
	Babiyachaur	33207
	Darbang	33208
	Pakhapani	33209
	Takam	33210
	Lulang	33211
Nawalparasi	Nawalparasi	33000
	Rakuwa	33001
	Bulingtar	33002
	Gaindakot	33003
	Dumkauli	33004
	Shergunj	33005
	Naya Belhani	33006
	Tribeni	33007
	Semari	33008
	Guthi persauni	33009
	Bhujahawa	33010
	Makar	33011
	Tilakpur	33012
	Maheshpur	33013
	Sunawal	33015
	Pithauli	33016
Nuwakot	Nuwakot	44900
	Thansingh	44902
	Ranipauwa	44903
	Taruka	44905
	Deurali	44906
	Kahule	44907
	Nuwakot	44908
	Chokade	44909
	Kharanitar	44910
	Bhadratar	44911
	Ramabati	44912
	Rautbesi	44913
	Pokharichapadanda	44914
	Devighat	44915
Okhaldhunga	Okhaldhunga	56100
	Khani Bhanjyang	56101
	Rumjatar	56102
	Rampur	56104
	Bigutar	56105
	Khiji Phalate	56106
	Gamanangtar	56107
	Ghorakhori	56108
	Chyanam	56109
	Mane Bhanjyang	56110
	Moli	56111
	Ragani	56112
Palpa	Palpa	32500
	Sahalkot	32501
	Rampur	32502
	Hungi	32503
	Jalpa	32504
	Tahu	32505
	Jhadewa	32506
	Aryabhanjyang	32507
	Madanpokhara	32508
	Khasyauli	32509
	Argali	32510
	Chhahara	32511
	Palungmainadi	32512
	Baldengadi	32513
Panchthar	Panchthar	57400
	Chyangthapu	57401
	Ambarpur	57402
	Namluwa	57403
	Yangnam	57404
	Nawamidanda	57406
	Mehelbote	57407
	Yasok	57408
	Mauwa	57409
	Rabi	57410
	Limba	57411
	Medibung	57412
Parbat	Parbat	33400
	Salija	33401
	Khurkot	33402
	Deurali	33403
	Thulipokhari	33405
	Karkineta	33406
	Devisthan	33407
	Bachchha	33408
	Lankhudeurali	33409
	Hubas	33410
	Khor Pokhara	33411
	Setibeni	33412
Parsa	Parsa	44300
	Aadarshanagar	44301
	Parbanipur	44303
	Bindabasini	44304
	Bahuari Pidari	44305
	Shirsiya Khalwatola	44306
	Biruwaguthi	44307
	Pakahamainpur	44308
	Phokhariya	44309
	Ranigunj	44310
	Paterwa Sugauli	44311
	Viswa	44312
	Janakitol	44313
	Jeetpur	44314
	Thori	44315
Pyuthan	Pyuthan	22300
	Dakhaquadi	22301
	Bhingri	22303
	Wangesal	22304
	Baraula	22305
	Majuwa	22307
	Machchhi	22308
	Thulabesi	22309
	Lungbahane	22310
	Bijuwar	22311
	Naya Gaun	22312
Ramechhap	Ramechhap	45400
	Those	45401
	Duragaun	45402
	Betali	45403
	Khimti	45404
	Saghutar	45405
	Kathjor	45406
	Puranagaun	45408
	Doramba	45409
	Hiledevi	45410
	Bhirpani	45411
Rasuwa	Rasuwa	45000
	Dhaibung	45003
	Ramkali	45004
	Rasuwa	45007
	Syaphru Besi	45009
Rautahat	Rautahat	44500
	Saruatha	44502
	Pipra bazar	44503
	Madhopur	44504
	Rajpurpharahadawa	44506
	Patharabudhram	44508
	Sitalpur	44509
	Shivanagar	44510
	Laxminiya	44511
	Katahariya	44512
	Samanpur	44513
	Chandra Nigahapur	44515
Rolpa	Rolpa	22100
	Khungri	22102
	Sirpa	22103
	Thawang	22106
	Himtakura	22107
	Ghartigaun	22108
	Nerpa	22110
	Dahaban	22111
	Shulichaur	22112
	Jhenam (Holeri)	22113
Rukum	Rukum	22000
	Rukumkot	22002
	Riwangchaur	22004
	Kol	22005
	Peugha	22007
	Chaurjahari	22008
	Simli	22009
	Radijyula	22010
	Baphikot	22011
Rupandehi	Rupandehi	32900
	Siktahan	32901
	Dhakadhai	32902
	Manigram	32903
	Kotihawa	32904
	Thutipipal	32905
	Butwal	32907
	Parroha	32908
	Sauraha Pharsa	32909
	Amuwa	32910
	Saljhandi	32911
	Suryapura	32912
	Tenuhawa	32913
	Lumbini	32914
	Betkuiya	32915
	Mahadehiya	32916
Salyan	Salyan	22200
	Kalimati Kalche	22201
	Luham	22202
	Dhanbang	22203
	Mahaneta	22204
	Malneta	22207
	Maidu	22208
	Ragechour	22209
	Bhalchaur	22210
	Tharmare	22211
Sankhuwasabha	Sankhuwasabha	56900
	Hatiya	56901
	Hedangana	56902
	Tamku	56903
	Chandanpur	56904
	Bahrabishe	56905
	Tumlingtar	56906
	Wana	56907
	Shidhakali	56908
	Madi	56909
	Ankhibhui	56910
	Mamling	56911
	Manebhanjyang	56912
	Chainpur	56913
Saptari	Saptari	56400
	Hanuman Nagar	56401
	Bairaba	56402
	Phattepur	56403
	Kanchanpur	56404
	Praswani	56405
	Bhagawatpur	56406
	Koiladi	56407
	Chhinnamasta	56408
	Bishnupur	56409
	Rupani	56411
	Pato	56412
	Arnaha	56413
	Kalyanpur	56414
	Bodebarsain	56415
	Sisawa	56416
	Kadarwona	56417
	Bhardaha	56418
Sarlahi	Sarlahi	45800
	Lalbandi	45801
	Bayalbas	45802
	Haripurwa	45803
	Hariaun	45804
	Haripur	45805
	Brahmapuri	45806
	Kaudena	45809
	Barahathawa	45810
	Sundarpur	45811
	Dumariya	45813
	Karmaiya	45814
	Harkathawa	45815
	Ramnagar(Bahuarwa)	45816
	Chhatauna	45817
Sindhuli	Sindhuli	45900
	Solpa	45901
	Bahun Tilpung	45902
	Dudhauli	45903
	Dakaha	45904
	Gwaltar	45905
	Khurkot	45906
	Belghari	45907
	Bhiman	45909
	Jhanga Jholi	45910
	Netrakali	45911
	Kapilakot	45912
	Pipalmadhiratanpur	45913
Sindhupalchok	Sindhupalchok	45300
	Kodari	45301
	Barabise	45302
	Atarpur	45304
	Lamosanghu	45305
	Nawalpur	45306
	Pangtang	45307
	Jalbire	45308
	Bhotsipa	45309
	Melamchi Bahunepati	45310
	Gyalthum	45311
	Thangapaldhap	45312
	Dubachaur	45313
	Balephi	45314
Siraha	Siraha	56500
	Bastipur	56501
	Lahan	56502
	Bhagawanpur	56503
	Dhanagadhi	56504
	Maheshpur patari	56505
	Bariyarpatti	56506
	Golbazar (Asanpur)	56508
	Sukhipur	56509
	Bishnupur	56511
	Belha	56512
	Madar	56513
	Mirchaiya	56515
	Bandipur	56516
	Kalyanpur	56517
Solukhumbu	Solukhumbu	56000
	Namche Bazar	56002
	Sotang	56004
	Jubu	56005
	Nele	56006
	Necha	56007
	Shishakhola	56008
	Himaganga	56009
	Lukla	56010
Sunsari	Sunsari	56700
	Mangalbare	56702
	Chatara	56703
	Bakalauri	56704
	Itahari	56705
	Simariya	56706
	Duhabi	56707
	Chimadi	56708
	Jhumka	56709
	Inarauwa	56710
	Aurabari	56711
	Dewangunj	56712
	Madhuvan	56713
	Laukahee	56714
	Bhutaha	56715
	Mahendra Nagar	56716
	Chhitaha	56717
Surkhet	Surkhet	21700
	Chhinchu	21701
	Ramghat	21702
	Sahare	21703
	Gumi	21704
	Bheriganga	21705
	Matela	21706
	Garpan	21707
	Kunathari	21709
	Babiyachaur	21710
	Gutu	21711
Syanja	Syangja	33800
	Kolma	33802
	Kichnas	33803
	Jharkham	33804
	Arjunchaupari	33805
	Panchamul	33806
	Rangethanti	33807
	Fedikhola	33808
	Bhumare	33811
	Kyakmi	33812
	Waidha Bhanjhyang	33813
	Chapakot	33814
	Galyang	33815
Tanahun	Tanahun	33900
	Tuhure Pasal	33902
	Manechauka	33903
	Bandipur	33904
	Aanbu Khaireni	33905
	Baidi	33906
	Kahunshivapur	33907
	Rising Ranipokhari	33908
	Ghiring Sundhara	33909
	Bhimad	33910
	Lamagaun	33911
	Khairenitar	33912
	Shisha Ghat	33913
	Dumre	33914
	Devaghat	33915
Taplajung	Khewang	57501
	Sadeba	57502
	Thokimba	57509
	Dobhan	57510
	Taplejung	57500
	Sinam	57503
	Pedang	57504
	Thechambu	57505
	Siwang	57506
	Khokling	57507
	Olangchunggola	57508
	Change	57511
	Hangpang	57512
Terhathum	Terhathum	57100
	Jirikhimti	57102
	Tinjure	57103
	Basantapur	57104
	Sudap	57105
	Hamarjung	57106
	Morahang	57107
	Pokalawang	57108
	Mulpani	57110
	Iwa	57111
Udayapur	Udayapur	56300
	Ratapani (Thoksila)	56301
	Beltar	56302
	Hadiya	56303
	Pokhari	56305
	Baraha	56306
	Bhutar	56307
	Rampur Jhilke	56308
	Udayapur Gadhi	56309
	Katari	56310
	Sorung Chhabise	56311
	Rauta Murkuchi	56312

This is a complete list of districts and post offices with its postal code of Nepal. Postal codes can also be searched using online resources such as the Nepal Postal Code Finder.

== See also ==
- Telephone numbers in Nepal
- List of districts of Nepal
