= Department of Water Supply and Sewerage Management =

Nepal Ministry of Water Supply's department

- खानेपानी तथा ढल व्यवस्थापन विभाग

Department overview
- Jurisdiction: Nepal
- Headquarters: Panipokhari, Maharajgunj (Kathmandu)
- Annual budget: NRs 20.72 Billion (FY 2080/81)
- Minister responsible: Kamal Raj Shrestha, Director General
- Parent department: Ministry of Infrastructure Development
- Website: https://www.dwssm.gov.np

The Department of Water Supply and Sewerage Management (DoWSSM) is a department under the Ministry of Infrastructure Development of Nepal, responsible planning implementing, operation and repair/maintenance of water supply and sanitation systems.

== History ==
Department of Water Supply and Sewerage Management was established in 1972 AD while the works were previously carried out by Department of Irrigation. The water supply coverage has reported to reach to 87.88% and sewerage to 99% in July 2018.

== Organization ==
The department is run by officers of Nepal Engineering Service (Civil/Drinking Water). There are currently 20 offices at central level under the department named Federal Water Supply and Sewerage Sewerage Management Project Office.

== See also ==
- Department of Roads
- Department of Urban Development and Building Construction
