= Department of Roads (Nepal) =

Department of Government of Nepal

- सडक विभाग
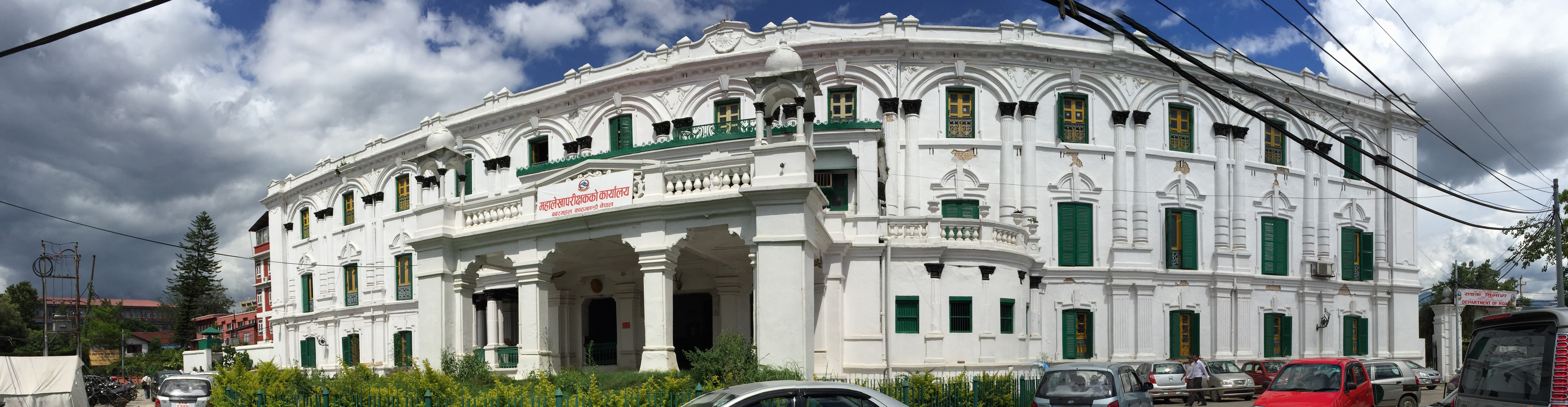
- Department of Roads

Department overview
- Formed: 2027 BS
- Type: Road construction and mentinance
- Jurisdiction: Government of Nepal
- Status: Active
- Headquarters: Babarmahal, Kathmandu, Nepal
- Employees: 1,835
- Annual budget: Nrs. 142.51 Billion (FY 2081/82)
- Director General responsible: Dr. Bijaya Jaishi
- Parent department: Ministry of Infrastructure Development
- Website: www.dor.gov.np

Department of Road (Nepali: सडक विभाग) under Ministry of Infrastructure Development is the authority to for construction, development and maintenance of roads. It aims to increase the connectivity to all the areas of Nepal. Being a sector of paramount importance, the department accounts for a significant amount of National budget.

Similarly, Department of Local Infrastructure also works under the sector of road and bridge construction and mentinance specially Agricultural roads at a smaller scale.

== History ==
Road Department was formed along with Department of Urban Development when Public Work Department was later split in 2027 BS. During Rana Regime "Bato Kaj Goshwara" and "Chhembhadel Adda" was liable for road construction and maintenance works.

== Organization ==
The department is headed by officers of Nepal Engineering Service (Civil/Highway) while mechanical units are held by officers of Nepal Engineering Service (Mechanical). There are 5 branches under the Department namely:

- Maintenance branch
- Development Cooperation Implementation Unit
- Planning and Monitoring Unit
- Mechanical Unit
- Bridge Unit

Further, there are four Federal Supervision and Monitoring Offices in Damak, Kathmandu, Pokhara and Surkhet. In addition there are 33 Road Division Offices, 8 Heavy Equipment Divisions, 8 Mechanical Offices and 1 Mechanical Training Center.

== See also ==
- Department of Local Infrastructure
- Department of Urban Development and Building Construction
