= Government of Nepal =

- नेपाल सरकार
- National Flag and Emblem of Nepal

Overview
- Established: 28 May 2008; 18 years ago
- State: Nepal
- Leader: Prime Minister (Balendra Shah)
- Appointed by: President of Nepal on the advice of the Federal Parliament
- Main organ: Council of Ministers
- Ministries: 14 ministerial departments
- Responsible to: Federal Parliament of Nepal
- Annual budget: ▲रू1.86 trillion (US$12 billion) (2024-25)
- Headquarters: Singha Durbar, Kathmandu
- Website: https://nepal.gov.np/

The Government of Nepal (Nepali: नेपाल सरकार, romanized: Nepāl Sarkār) is the central executive authority of the Federal Democratic Republic of Nepal. The head of state is the President and the Prime Minister holds the position of the head of executive. The role of the president is largely ceremonial as the functioning of the government is managed entirely by the Prime Minister, who is appointed by the Parliament. The Prime Minister selects all the other ministers; together they form the Council of Ministers. The heads of constitutional bodies are appointed by the President on the recommendation of the Constitutional Council, with the exception of the Attorney General, who is appointed by the President on the recommendation of the Prime Minister.

The current government is headed by Balendra Shah since 27 March 2026, after Rastriya Swatantra Party won a landslide victory in 2026 general election.

== History ==
=== Bharadari government ===
The character of government in the Kingdom of Nepal was derived from the consultative state capacity of the previous Gorkha hill principality, known as Bharadar. (Note: Bharadar translates as 'bearers of burden of state'.) These Bharadars were drawn from high caste and politically influential families. For instance, the Thar Ghan aristocratic group in the earlier Gorkha hill principality. Bharadars formed a consultative body in the kingdom for the most important functions of the state as councillors, ministers and diplomats. There was no one single successful coalition government as court politics were driven by large factional rivalries, consecutive conspiracies and ostracization of opponent Bharadar families through assassination rather than legal expulsion. Another reason was the minority of the reigning King between 1777 and 1847 that led to the establishment of anarchical rule. The government was stated to have been controlled by regents, Mukhtiyars and alliances of political factions with strong fundamental support. In the end of the 18th century, the central politics was regularly dominated by two notable political factions: Thapas and Pandes. As per historians and contemporary writer Francis Hamilton, the government of Nepal (Note: Here the government of Nepal can simply be called Bharadari Sabha or Council of Bharadars.) comprised

- 1 Chautariya
- 4 Kajis
- 4 Sirdar/Sardars
- 2 Subedars
- 1 Khazanchi
- 1 Kapardar.

As for Regmi states, the government of Nepal comprised

- 4 Chautariyas
- 4 Kajis
- 4 Sirdar/Sardars. Later, the number varied after King Rana Bahadur Shah abdicated his throne to minor son in 1799. There were 95 Bharadars as per the copper inscription of King Rana Bahadur Shah.

In 1794, King Rana Bahadur Shah came of age and his first act was to re-constitute the government such that his uncle, Prince Bahadur Shah of Nepal, had no official part to play. Rana Bahadur appointed Kirtiman Singh Basnyat as Chief (Mul) Kaji among the newly appointed four Kajis though Damodar Pande was the most influential Kaji. Kirtiman had succeeded Abhiman Singh Basnyat as Chief Kaji while Prince Bahadur Shah was succeeded as Chief (Mul) Chautariya by Prince Ranodyot Shah, then heir apparent of King Rana Bahadur Shah by a Chhetri Queen Subarna Prabha Devi. Kajis had held the administrative and executive powers of nation after the fall of Chief Chautariya Prince Bahadur Shah in 1794. Later, Kirtiman Singh was secretly assassinated on 28 September 1801, by the supporters of Raj Rajeshwari Devi and his brother Bakhtawar Singh Basnyat, was then given the post of Chief (Mul) Kaji. Later Damodar Pande was appointed by Queen Rajrajeshwari as Chief Kaji. When the exiled abdicated King Rana Bahadur Shah prepared his return in 1804, he arrested many government officials including then Chief Kaji Damodar Pande and sacked the reigning government. He took over the administration of Nepal by assuming the position of Mukhtiyar (chief authority). A new government was constituted with favoring officials. Bhimsen Thapa was made a second kaji; Ranajit Pande, who was the father-in-law of Bhimsen's brother, was made the Mul (Chief) Kaji; Sher Bahadur Shah, Rana Bahadur's half-brother, was made the Mul (Chief) Chautariya; while Rangnath Paudel was made the Raj Guru (royal spiritual preceptor). Later in April 1806, tensions arose between Chief Chautariya Sher Bahadur Shah and Mukhtiyar Rana Bahadur Shah on the night of 25 April 1806 during a meeting at Tribhuvan Khawas's house where around 10 pm, Sher Bahadur in desperation drew a sword and killed Rana Bahadur Shah before being cut down by nearby courtiers, Bam Shah and Bal Narsingh Kunwar, also allies of Bhimsen. The assassination of Rana Bahadur Shah triggered a great massacre in Bhandarkhal (a royal garden east of Kathmandu Durbar) and at the bank of Bishnumati river after which Kaji Bhimsen killed 55 senior officials to benefit from the chaos. He was declared Mukhtiyar (Chief Authority) of Nepal and led the new government from a royal mandate of minor King Girvan Yuddha Bikram Shah.

Mukhtiyars ruled over the executive and administrative functions of the state until its replacement by the British conventional prime minister in 1843 conferred upon then ruling Mukhtiyar Mathabar Singh Thapa.

=== Ideals of the old Bharadari government ===
The policies of the old Bharadari governments were derived from ancient Hindu texts as Dharmashastra and Manusmriti. The king was considered an incarnation of Lord Vishnu and was the chief authority over legislative, judiciary and executive functions. The judiciary functions were decided on the principles of Hindu Dharma codes of conduct. The king had full rights to expel any person who offended the country and also pardon the offenders and grant return to the country. In practice, the government was not an absolute monarchy due to the dominance of Nepalese political clans making the Shah monarch a puppet ruler. These basic Hindu templates provide the evidence that Nepal was administered as a Hindu state.

=== Republic (2008–present) ===
The transition to a republic was a pivotal moment in the history of Nepal, marking the end of the 240-year-old Shah dynasty. Following a decade-long civil war and significant political upheaval, a Comprehensive Peace Accord was signed in November 2006. In December 2007, an agreement was reached to abolish the monarchy after the upcoming elections. On 28 May 2008, the newly elected Constituent Assembly overwhelmingly voted to declare Nepal a Federal Democratic Republic. Ram Baran Yadav became the first President of the republic in July 2008, and Pushpa Kamal Dahal was elected as the first Prime Minister in August 2008.

== Legislature ==
- Speaker of the House of Representatives: Dol Prasad Aryal
- Chairperson of the National Assembly: Narayan Prasad Dahal

== Executive ==
=== President ===
- President: Ram Chandra Paudel

=== Vice president ===
- Vice President: Ram Sahaya Yadav

=== Prime minister ===
- Prime Minister: Balendra Shah

=== Cabinet, ministries and agencies ===
Ministries and departments of the Government of Nepal
#	Ministry		Department(s)
#	English	Nepali	Department(s)
1.	Office of the Prime Minister and Council of Ministers	प्रधानमन्त्री तथा मन्त्रिपरिषद्को कार्यालय	Department of Information
2.	Ministry of Finance	अर्थ मन्त्रालय	Department of Customs
2.	Ministry of Finance	अर्थ मन्त्रालय	Inland Revenue Department
2.	Ministry of Finance	अर्थ मन्त्रालय	Department of Money Laundering Investigation
3.	Ministry of Home Affairs	गृह मन्त्रालय	Department of Immigration
3.	Ministry of Home Affairs	गृह मन्त्रालय	Department of National ID and Civil Registration
3.	Ministry of Home Affairs	गृह मन्त्रालय	Department of Criminal Assets Management
3.	Ministry of Home Affairs	गृह मन्त्रालय	Department of Prison Management
4.	Ministry of Energy, Water Resources and Irrigation	उर्जा, जलश्रोत तथा सिँचाइ मन्त्रालय	Department of Electricity Development
4.	Ministry of Energy, Water Resources and Irrigation	उर्जा, जलश्रोत तथा सिँचाइ मन्त्रालय	Department of Hydrology and Meteorology
4.	Ministry of Energy, Water Resources and Irrigation	उर्जा, जलश्रोत तथा सिँचाइ मन्त्रालय	Department of Water Resources and Irrigation
5.	Ministry of Infrastructure Development	पूर्वाधार विकास मन्त्रालय	Department of Roads
5.	Ministry of Infrastructure Development	पूर्वाधार विकास मन्त्रालय	Department of Transport Management
5.	Ministry of Infrastructure Development	पूर्वाधार विकास मन्त्रालय	Department of Railways
5.	Ministry of Infrastructure Development	पूर्वाधार विकास मन्त्रालय	Department of Local Infrastructure Development
5.	Ministry of Infrastructure Development	पूर्वाधार विकास मन्त्रालय	Department of Urban Development and Building Construction
5.	Ministry of Infrastructure Development	पूर्वाधार विकास मन्त्रालय	Department of Water Supply and Sewerage Management
6.	Ministry of Law, Justice and Parliamentary Affairs	कानुन, न्याय तथा संसदीय मामिला मन्त्रालय	
7.	Ministry of Information and Communications	सूचना तथा सञ्चार मन्त्रालय	Department of Printing
7.	Ministry of Information and Communications	सूचना तथा सञ्चार मन्त्रालय	Department of Information Technology
7.	Ministry of Information and Communications	सूचना तथा सञ्चार मन्त्रालय	Department of Information and Broadcasting
7.	Ministry of Information and Communications	सूचना तथा सञ्चार मन्त्रालय	Postal Services Department
8.	Ministry of Youth, Labour and Employment	युवा, श्रम तथा रोजगार मन्त्रालय	Department of Foreign Employment
8.	Ministry of Youth, Labour and Employment	युवा, श्रम तथा रोजगार मन्त्रालय	Department of Labour and Occupational Safety
9.	Ministry of Foreign Affairs	परराष्ट्र मन्त्रालय	Department of Passport
9.	Ministry of Foreign Affairs	परराष्ट्र मन्त्रालय	Department of Consular Services
10.	Ministry of Land Management, Cooperatives, Federal Affairs and General Administration	भूमि व्यवस्था, सहकारी, संघीय मामिला तथा सामान्य प्रशासन मन्त्रालय	Department of Co-operatives
10.	Ministry of Land Management, Cooperatives, Federal Affairs and General Administration	भूमि व्यवस्था, सहकारी, संघीय मामिला तथा सामान्य प्रशासन मन्त्रालय	Department of Land Management and Archive
10.	Ministry of Land Management, Cooperatives, Federal Affairs and General Administration	भूमि व्यवस्था, सहकारी, संघीय मामिला तथा सामान्य प्रशासन मन्त्रालय	Department of Survey
10.	Ministry of Land Management, Cooperatives, Federal Affairs and General Administration	भूमि व्यवस्था, सहकारी, संघीय मामिला तथा सामान्य प्रशासन मन्त्रालय	Department of National Personnel Records
10.	Ministry of Land Management, Cooperatives, Federal Affairs and General Administration	भूमि व्यवस्था, सहकारी, संघीय मामिला तथा सामान्य प्रशासन मन्त्रालय	Department of Federal Affairs
11.	Ministry of Industry, Commerce and Supplies	उद्योग, वाणिज्य तथा आपूर्ति मन्त्रालय	Department of Industry
11.	Ministry of Industry, Commerce and Supplies	उद्योग, वाणिज्य तथा आपूर्ति मन्त्रालय	Department of Mines and Geology
11.	Ministry of Industry, Commerce and Supplies	उद्योग, वाणिज्य तथा आपूर्ति मन्त्रालय	Department of Commerce, Supply and Consumer Protection
12.	Ministry of Women, Children, Gender and Sexual Minorities and Social Security	महिला, बालबालिका, लैङ्गिक तथा यौनिक अल्पसंख्यक र सामाजिक सुरक्षा मन्त्रालय	Department of Women and Children
13.	Ministry of Health and Food Hygiene	स्वास्थ्य तथा खाद्य स्वच्छता मन्त्रालय	Department of Health Services
13.	Ministry of Health and Food Hygiene	स्वास्थ्य तथा खाद्य स्वच्छता मन्त्रालय	Department of Ayurveda and Alternative Medicine
13.	Ministry of Health and Food Hygiene	स्वास्थ्य तथा खाद्य स्वच्छता मन्त्रालय	Department of Drug Administration
13.	Ministry of Health and Food Hygiene	स्वास्थ्य तथा खाद्य स्वच्छता मन्त्रालय	Department of Food Technology and Quality Control
14.	Ministry of Culture, Tourism and Civil Aviation	संस्कृति, पर्यटन तथा नागरिक उड्डयन मन्त्रालय	Department of Archaeology
14.	Ministry of Culture, Tourism and Civil Aviation	संस्कृति, पर्यटन तथा नागरिक उड्डयन मन्त्रालय	Department of Tourism
15.	Ministry of Agriculture, Forests and Environment	कृषि, वन तथा पर्यावरण मन्त्रालय	Department of Agriculture
15.	Ministry of Agriculture, Forests and Environment	कृषि, वन तथा पर्यावरण मन्त्रालय	Department of Livestock Services
15.	Ministry of Agriculture, Forests and Environment	कृषि, वन तथा पर्यावरण मन्त्रालय	Department of National Parks and Wildlife Conservation
15.	Ministry of Agriculture, Forests and Environment	कृषि, वन तथा पर्यावरण मन्त्रालय	Department of Forests and Soil Conservation
15.	Ministry of Agriculture, Forests and Environment	कृषि, वन तथा पर्यावरण मन्त्रालय	Department of Environment
15.	Ministry of Agriculture, Forests and Environment	कृषि, वन तथा पर्यावरण मन्त्रालय	Department of Plant Resources
16.	Ministry of Education and Sports	शिक्षा तथा खेलकुद मन्त्रालय	Department of Education
17.	Ministry of Defence	रक्षा मन्त्रालय	
18.	Ministry of Science, Technology and Innovation	विज्ञान, प्रविधि तथा नवप्रवर्तन मन्त्रालय	

=== Constitutional bodies ===
Constitutional body	Head of constitutional body		Website
Constitutional body	Position/Title	Name	Website
Specialized Commissions
Commission for the Investigation of Abuse of Authority	Chief Commissioner	Prem Kumar Rai	official website
Public Service Commission	Chairman	Madhav Prasad Regmi	official website
Election Commission	Chief Election Commission	Dinesh Thapaliya	official website
National Human Rights Commission	Chairman	Top Bahadur Magar	official website
National Natural Resources and Fiscal Commission	Chairman	Balananda Poudel	official website
Office of the Auditor General	Auditor General	Tanka Mani Sharma (Dangal)	official website
Other Commissions
National Women Commission	Chairman	Kamala Kumari Parajuli	official website
National Dalit Commission	Chairman	Devraj Bishwokarma	official website
National Inclusion Commission	Acting Chairman	Haridatta Joshi	official website
Indigenous Nationalities Commission	Chairman	Ram Bahadur Thapa Magar	official website
Madhesi Commission	Acting Chairman	Jibachha Shah	official website
Tharu Commission	Acting Chairman	Subodh Shingh Tharu	official website
Muslim Commission	Acting Chairman	Mahamdin Ali	official website

=== Security services ===
Security Service	Head of agency		Website
Security Service	Position/Title	Current Head	Website
Nepal Army	Chief of Army Staff (प्रधान सेनापति)	Gen. Ashok Raj Sigdel	official website
Nepal Police	Inspector General (प्रहरी महानिरीक्षक)	Dan Bahadur Karki	official website
Armed Police Force	Inspector General (सशस्त्र प्रहरी महानिरीक्षक)	Narayan Datta Paudel	official website
National Investigation Department	Chief Investigation Director	Hutaraj Thapa	official website

=== Secretaries ===
- Chief Secretary: Govinda Bahadur Karki

== Judiciary ==
- Chief Justice of the Supreme Court: Manoj Kumar Sharma
- Judges of the Supreme Court of Nepal

== International organisation participation ==
Nepal is an active participant in various international organisations. It joined the United Nations on 14 December 1955, and has contributed to global peace and stability. Nepal is a founding member of the South Asian Association for Regional Cooperation (SAARC), established on 8 December 1985, and hosts its secretariat in Kathmandu. Furthermore, Nepal became a full member of the Bay of Bengal Initiative for Multi-Sectoral Technical and Economic Cooperation (BIMSTEC) on 8 February 2004, and joined the World Trade Organization (WTO) on 23 April 2004. Other memberships include UNDP, ESCAP, FAO, ICAO, IDA, IFAD, IFC, IMF, IMO, Interpol, UNCTAD, UNESCO, and WHO.

== See also ==
- Local self-government in Nepal
- List of mayors of places in Nepal
