= Department of Urban Development and Building Construction =

Department of Government of Nepal

- शहरी विकास तथा भवन निर्माण विभाग

Department overview
- Formed: 2019 BS
- Type: Urban development
- Jurisdiction: Government of Nepal
- Status: Active
- Headquarters: Babarmahal, Kathmandu, Nepal
- Employees: 484
- Annual budget: Nrs. 58.06 Billion
- Director General responsible: Er. Rabindra Bohora
- Parent department: Ministry of Infrastructure Development
- Website: www.dudbc.gov.np

Department of Urban Development and Building Construction (Nepali: शहरी विकास तथा भवन निर्माण विभाग) under Ministry of Infrastructure Development is the authority to assure safe and affordable building construction throughout the nation through planned settlement. Its also responsible for promoting construction of safer, economic and sustainable buildings meeting the basic needs of the general public.

== History ==
Department of Urban Development and Building Construction was established in 2019 BS under the then Ministry of Construction and Transport to develop planned urban settlement.

== Organization structure ==
The organization is run by officers of Nepal Engineering Service (Building and Architecture) and accounts for a significant amount of national budget.

The department has several offices, implementation units to implement its yearly programs and projects throughout the nation.

- Project Office of Urban Development and Building Construction - 13
- Federal Level Project Implementation Unit - 7
- New Town Project Co-ordination Offices - 11

== See also ==
- Department of Road
