= Maharjan =

Hindu Buddhist Newar caste

Maharjan (Nepali: महर्जन), is one of the Hindu Buddhist Newar castes or groups of Nepal, predominantly from Patan, Kirtipur, Bhaktapur and Kathmandu in Kathmandu Valley. They are a major subgroup of the Jyapu ज्यापू: community inside the Newar community. Maharjan people along with the other subgroups of the same community are also known as Jyapus.

== As a surname ==
Notable people with the surname Maharjan include:

- Bal Gopal Maharjan (born 1975), Nepali footballer
- Biraj Maharjan (born 1990), Nepali footballer
- Chandra Maharjan, Nepali politician
- Chiri Babu Maharjan, Nepali politician
- Chhori Maiya Maharjan, Nepali missing person
- Deepak Maharjan (born 1983), Nepali boxer, Asian Games medalist
- Krishna Lal Maharjan (born 1954), Nepali politician
- Nanita Maharjan (born 1985), Nepali bodybuilder
- Prem Bahadur Maharjan, Nepali politician
- Pukar Maharjan, Nepali politician
- Sabita Maharjan (born 1980), Nepali computer scientist, professor in Norway
- Sushila Maharjan, Nepali biochemist and biotechnologist
- Rojman Maharjan, (Singer)
- Babu Raja Maharjan Most renown percussionist of Nepal
- John Maharjan (John Ma Tattoo) legendary, most renowned and celebrated tattoo artist from nepal
- Samraat Maharjan (Cricket Writer, Covers Nepali Cricket)
- Razee Maharjan (Influencer)

== See also ==
- Newar
- Newar Buddhism
- Prajapati
- Tuladhar
- Dangol
- Vajracharya
