= Ministry of Information and Communication (Nepal) =

Federal ministry of Nepal

- सूचना तथा सञ्चार मन्त्रालय
- Emblem of Nepal

Ministry overview
- Formed: 13 May 2026; 3 months ago
- Preceding Ministry: Ministry of Communication and Information Technology
- Jurisdiction: Government of Nepal
- Headquarters: Singha Durbar, Kathmandu
- Minister responsible: Bikram Timilsina, Cabinet Minister
- Website: mocit.gov.np

The Ministry of Information and Communication is a federal ministry of Nepal responsible for the oversight of the telecommunications, broadcasting, and postal services. It was established in its current form on May 13, 2026, following the approval of the Nepal Government (Work Division) Regulations, 2083.

As part of the Balendra Shah-led government's reform to reduce the number of ministries from 22 to 18, the formerly named Ministry of Communications and Information Technology was restructured, with its digital governance wings transferred to the Office of the Prime Minister and Council of Ministers.

== List of ministers ==
This is a list of all Ministers of Information and Communications since the Nepalese Constituent Assembly election in 2013:

	Name	Political affiliation	Assumed office	Left office
Ministry of Information and Communication (2013-2018)
1	Minendra Rijal	Nepali Congress	25 February 2014	12 October 2015
2	Sher Dhan Rai	Communist Party of Nepal (Unified Marxist–Leninist)	5 November 2015	14 August 2016
3	Ram Karki	Communist Party of Nepal (Maoist Centre)	14 August 2016	31 May 2017
4	Mohan Bahadur Basnet	Nepali Congress	26 July 2017	15 February 2018
Ministry of Communication and Information Technology (2018-2026)
5	Gokul Prasad Baskota	Nepal Communist Party	1 June 2018	20 February 2020
6	Yuba Raj Khatiwada	Nepal Communist Party	4 March 2020	14 Oct 2020
7	Parbat Gurung	Nepal Communist Party	15 Oct 2020	4 June 2021
8	Nainkala Thapa	CPN UML	10 June 2021	22 June 2021
9	Gyanendra Bahadur Karki	Nepali Congress	8 October 2021	26 December 2022
10	Rekha Sharma	Communist Party of Nepal (Maoist Centre)	17 January 2023	4 March 2024
11	Prithvi Subba Gurung	Communist Party of Nepal (Unified Marxist–Leninist)	15 July 2024	9 September 2025
12	Jagdish Kharel	Independent	12 September 2025	19 January 2026
13	Dr. Bikram Timilsina	Rastriya Swatantra Party	27 March 2026	14 May 2026
Ministry of Information and Communication (2026)
-	Dr. Bikram Timilsina	Rastriya Swatantra Party	14 May 2026	Incumbent
