= Nuwakot 1 =

Parliamentary constituency in Bagmati Province, Nepal

- Parliamentary constituency
- Nuwakot 1 in Bagmati Province
- Province: Bagmati Province
- District: Nuwakot District

Current constituency
- Created: 1991
- Party: Rastriya Swatantra Party
- Member of Parliament: Bikram Timilsina

Nuwakot 1 is one of two parliamentary constituencies of Nuwakot District in Nepal. This constituency came into existence on the Constituency Delimitation Commission (CDC) report submitted on 31 August 2017.

== Incorporated areas ==
Nuwakot 1 parliamentary constituency incorporates Dupcheshwar Rural Municipality, Shivapuri Rural Municipality, Tadi Rural Municipality, Panchakanya Rural Municipality, Suryagadhi Rural Municipality, Likhu Rural Municipality and Kakani Rural Municipality.

== Assembly segments ==
It encompasses the following Bagmati Provincial Assembly segment

- Nuwakot 1(A)
- Nuwakot 1(B)

== Members of Parliament ==
=== Parliament/Constituent Assembly ===
| Election | Member | Party |
|---|---|---|
| 1991 | Prakash Chandra Lohani | Rastriya Prajatantra Party (Chand) |
| 1991 | Prakash Chandra Lohani | Rastriya Prajatantra Party |
| 1999 | Rajendra Prakash Lohani | CPN (Unified Marxist–Leninist) |
| 2008 | Bimala Subedi | CPN (Maoist) |
| 2013 | Arjun Narsingh K.C. | Nepali Congress |
| 2017 | Hit Bahadur Tamang | Nepal Communist Party |

=== Provincial Assembly ===
==== 1(A) ====
| Election | Member | Party |
|---|---|---|
| 2017 | Radhika Tamang | CPN (Maoist Centre) |
| May 2018 | Radhika Tamang | Nepal Communist Party |

==== 1(B) ====
| Election | Member | Party |
|---|---|---|
| 2017 | Badri Mainali | CPN (Unified Marxist–Leninist) |
| May 2018 | Badri Mainali | Nepal Communist Party |

== Election results ==
=== Election in the 2020s ===
==== 2022 general election ====
| Candidate | Party | Votes | % |
|---|---|---|---|
| Hit Bahadur Tamang | CPN (Maoist Centre) | 26,548 | 44.23 |
| Badri Mainali | CPN (UML) | 23,465 | 39.09 |
| Pradhumna Mahat Chhetri | Rastriya Swatantra Party | 6,113 | 10.18 |
| Sudarshan Sitaula | Rastriya Prajatantra Party | 1,611 | 2.68 |
| Others | | 2,284 | 3.81 |
| Total | | 60,021 | 100.00 |
| Majority | | 3,083 | |
| CPN (Maoist Centre) hold | | | |

=== Election in the 2010s ===
==== 2017 legislative elections ====
| Party | Candidate | Votes |
|---|---|---|
| CPN (Maoist Centre) | Hit Bahadur Tamang | 36,473 |
| Nepali Congress | Ram Sharan Mahat | 27,920 |
| Others | | 1,634 |
| Invalid votes | | 3,668 |
| Result | Maoist Centre gain | |
Source: Election Commission

==== 2017 Nepalese provincial elections ====
===== Nuwakot 1(A) =====
| Party | Candidate | Votes |
|---|---|---|
| CPN (Maoist Centre) | Radhika Tamang | 18,137 |
| Nepali Congress | Mahendra Thing | 13,368 |
| Others | | 1,097 |
| Invalid votes | | 1,340 |
| Result | Maoist Centre gain | |
Source: Election Commission

===== Nuwakot 1(B) =====
| Party | Candidate | Votes |
|---|---|---|
| CPN (Unified Marxist–Leninist) | Badri Mainali | 20,509 |
| Nepali Congress | Ramesh Kumar Mahat | 12,217 |
| Others | | 1,372 |
| Invalid votes | | 1,627 |
| Result | CPN (UML) gain | |
Source: Election Commission

==== 2013 Constituent Assembly election ====
| Party | Candidate | Votes |
|---|---|---|
| Nepali Congress | Arjun Narsingh K.C. | 17,346 |
| UCPN (Maoist) | Bimala Subedi | 9,145 |
| Rastriya Prajatantra Party | Prakash Chandra Lohani | 6,927 |
| CPN (Unified Marxist–Leninist) | Keshav Raj Pandey | 6,401 |
| Others | | 1,235 |
| Result | Congress gain | |
Source: NepalNews

=== Election in the 2000s ===
==== 2008 Constituent Assembly election ====
| Party | Candidate | Votes |
|---|---|---|
| CPN (Maoist) | Bimala Subedi | 20,581 |
| Nepali Congress | Arjun Narsingh K.C. | 12,984 |
| CPN (Unified Marxist–Leninist) | Rajendra Prakash Lohani | 6,730 |
| Rastriya Janashakti Party | Rajendra Prasad Shrestha | 4,720 |
| CPN (Marxist–Leninist) | Kedar Nath Bajgain | 2,237 |
| Others | | 1,648 |
| Invalid votes | | 3,286 |
| Result | Maoist gain | |
Source: Election Commission

=== Election in the 1990s ===
==== 1999 legislative elections ====
| Party | Candidate | Votes |
|---|---|---|
| CPN (Unified Marxist–Leninist) | Rajendra Prakash Lohani | 11,786 |
| Rastriya Prajatantra Party | Prakash Chandra Lohani | 11,771 |
| Nepali Congress | Dhruba Prasad Adhikari | 11,018 |
| CPN (Marxist–Leninist) | Toya Nath Thapaliya | 2,780 |
| Rastriya Prajatantra Party (Chand) | Jeet Singh Khadka | 1,016 |
| Others | | 578 |
| Invalid Votes | | 1,354 |
| Result | CPN (UML) gain | |
Source: Election Commission

==== 1994 legislative elections ====
| Party | Candidate | Votes |
|---|---|---|
| Rastriya Prajatantra Party | Prakash Chandra Lohani | 13,100 |
| Nepali Congress | Khem Raj Sedai | 10,714 |
| CPN (Unified Marxist–Leninist) | Rajendra Prakash Lohani | 8,942 |
| Result | RPP hold | |
Source: Election Commission

==== 1991 legislative elections ====
| Party | Candidate | Votes |
|---|---|---|
| Rastriya Prajatantra Party (Chand) | Prakash Chandra Lohani | 11,870 |
| Samyukta Jana Morcha Nepal | Toyanath Thapaliya | 8,796 |
| Result | RPP (C) gain | |

== See also ==
- List of parliamentary constituencies of Nepal
