= Jagadish Kharel =

Nepalese politician

Honourable Jagadish Kharel
- जगदीश खरेल

Member of Parliament, Pratinidhi Sabha
- Incumbent
- Assumed office 26 March 2026
- Preceded by: Ganga Karki
- Constituency: Dolakha 1

Personal details
- Born: 9 April 1989 (age 37) Kalinchowk, Dolakha
- Citizenship: Nepalese
- Party: Rastriya Swatantra Party (2022 – present)
- Parent: Loknath Kharel (father)
- Profession: Politician

Jagadish Kharel (Nepali: जगदीश खरेल) is a Nepalese politician of Rastriya Swatantra Party, currently serving as a member of parliament. He was elected to the Pratinidhi Sabha, the lower house of the Federal Parliament of Nepal from the Dolakha 1 parliamentary constituency in the 2026 Nepalese General Election. He secured 32,376 votes and defeated Parbat Gurung of the CPN (UML).

== Personal and academic life ==
Kharel was born in Kalinchowk, Dolakha, on April 9, 1989. He was born to Loknath Kharel. He passed the SLC from Kaalinaag Secondary School. He moved to Kathmandu for his civil engineering degree.

== Politics ==
He began his political journey by joining the Nepal Student Union, the student wing of the Nepali Congress. He also served as the president of the Nepali Congress Kathmandu-Dolakha liaison committee. He joined the Rastriya Swatantra Party in 2022 and contested the 2022 Nepalese general election from the Dolakha 1 constituency. In that election, he received only 3,801 (4.69%) votes and placed third.

== Electoral performance ==
Election	Year	Constituency	Contested for	Political party	Result	Votes	% of votes	Ref.
Nepal general election	2026	Dolakha 1	Pratinidhi Sabha member	Rastriya Swatantra Party	Won	32,376	40.53%	
Nepal general election	2022	Dolakha 1	Pratinidhi Sabha member	Rastriya Swatantra Party	Lost	3,801	4.69%	
