= Tau Daha =

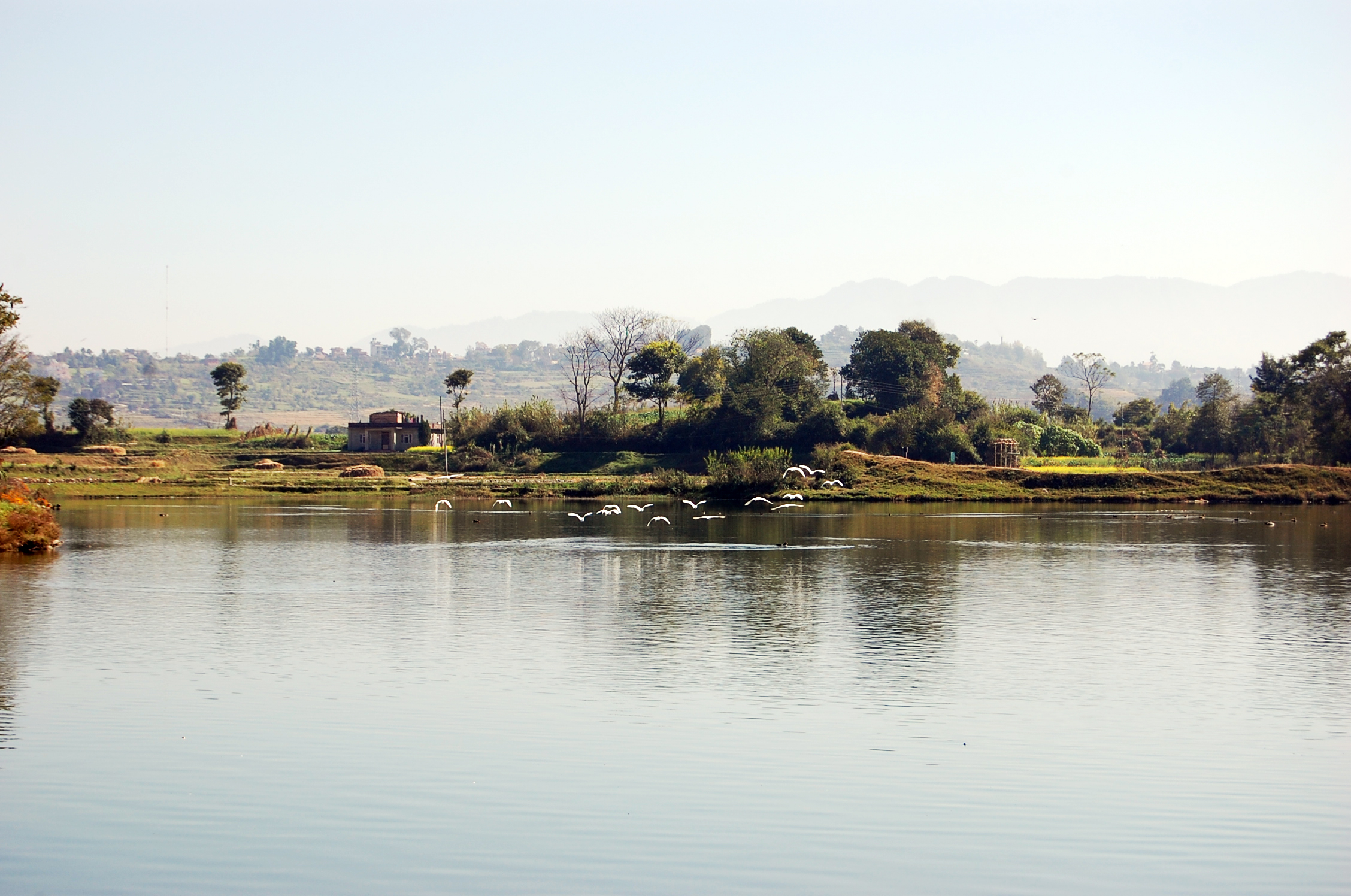
Tau Daha on the way to Dachinkali, 2008.

Tau Daha is a tourist destination located in Kirtipur, Nepal. The fresh air, silent water, fish feeding, bird watching, and photography are major attractions.
