= Newa FM =

Radio station in Kirtipur, Nepal

Newa FM is a Nepali community radio station with a 100 Watt transmitter operated by the Newar Cultural Center. The station is located in Kirtipur, Nepal, Ward # 2. It started the transmission on May 25, 2009. Currently the station broadcasts from 7-9 AM and 2-5 PM in the Newari language.

The station uses a TX 100/S Plus transmitter made by Cte broadcast, Italy.
