= Lalitpur 2 =

Nepali parliamentary constituency

- Parliamentary constituency for the House of Representatives
- Lalitpur 2 in Bagmati Province

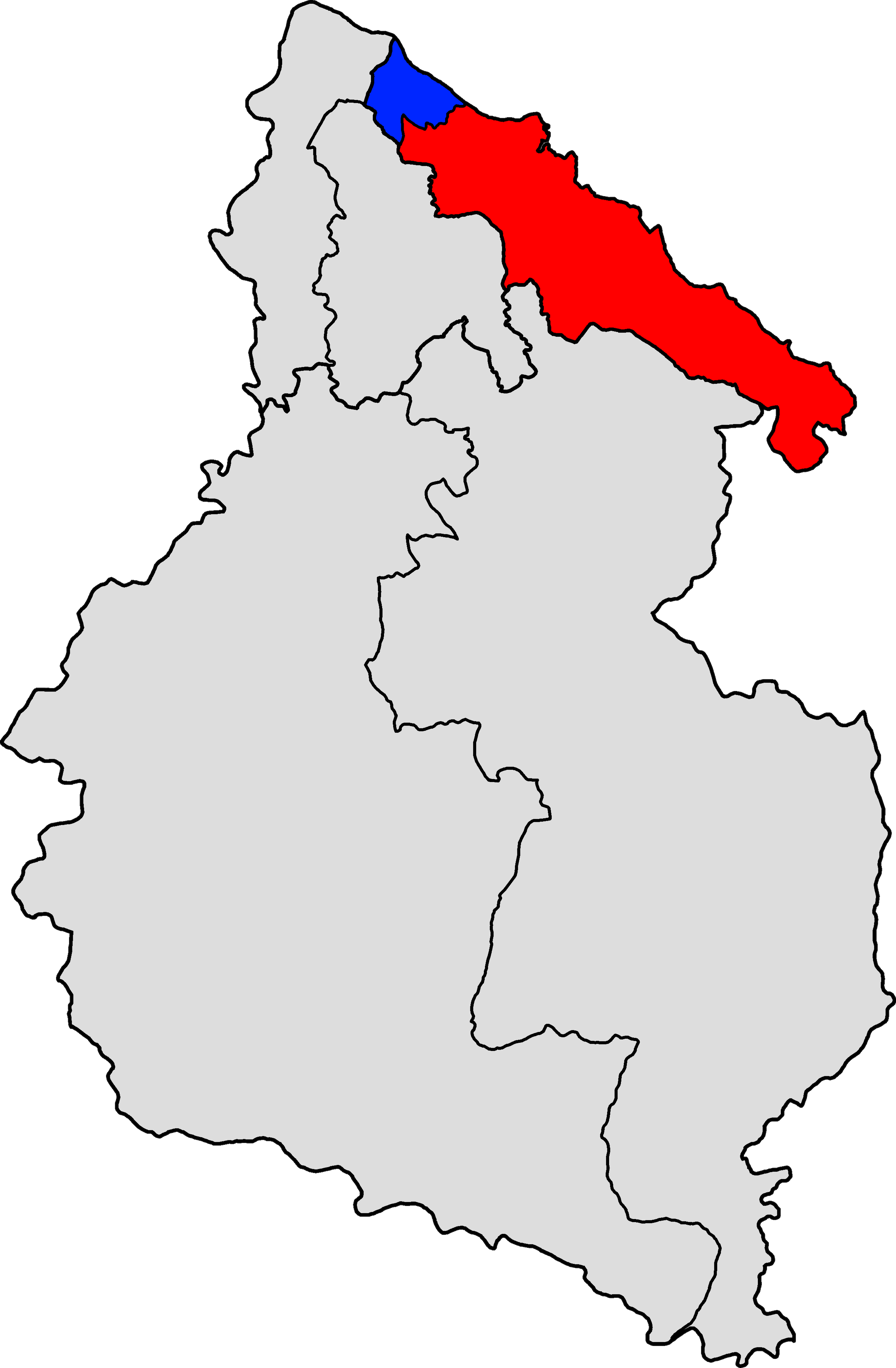
- Assembly segments Lalitpur 2(A) (red) and Lalitpur 2(B) (blue) within Lalitpur District
- Province: Bagmati Province
- District: Lalitpur District
- Electorate: 75,981

Current constituency
- Created: 1991
- Party: Rastriya Swatantra Party
- MP: Jagdish Kharel
- Bagmati MPA 2(A): Madhav Prasad Paudel (NCP)
- Bagmati MPA 2(B): Gyanendra Shakya (NCP)

Lalitpur 2 is one of three parliamentary constituencies of Lalitpur District in Nepal. This constituency came into existence on the Constituency Delimitation Commission (CDC) report submitted on 31 August 2017.

== Incorporated areas ==
Lalitpur 2 parliamentary constituency consists of Mahalaxmi Municipality and wards 6–9, 11, 12, 16, 17 and 19 of Lalitpur Metropolitan City.

== Assembly segments ==
It encompasses the following Bagmati Provincial Assembly segments

- Lalitpur 2(A)
- Lalitpur 2(B)

== Members of Parliament ==
=== Parliament/Constituent Assembly ===
Election	Member	Party
1991	Siddhi Lal Singh	CPN (Unified Marxist–Leninist)
March 1998	Siddhi Lal Singh	CPN (Marxist–Leninist)
1999	Krishna Lal Maharjan	CPN (Unified Marxist–Leninist)
2008	Raj Kaji Maharjan	CPN (Maoist)
January 2009	Raj Kaji Maharjan	UCPN (Maoist)
2013	Chandra Maharjan	Nepali Congress
2017	Krishna Lal Maharjan	CPN (Unified Marxist–Leninist)
May 2018	Krishna Lal Maharjan	Nepal Communist Party
March 2021	Krishna Lal Maharjan	CPN (Unified Marxist–Leninist)
August 2021	Krishna Lal Maharjan	CPN (Unified Socialist)
2022	Prem Bahadur Maharjan	CPN (Unified Marxist–Leninist)
2026	Jagdish Kharel	Rastriya Swatantra Party

=== Provincial Assembly ===
==== 2(A) ====
Election	Member	Party
2017	Madhav Prasad Paudel	CPN (Unified Marxist–Leninist)
May 2018	Madhav Prasad Paudel	Nepal Communist Party
March 2021	Madhav Prasad Paudel	CPN (Unified Marxist–Leninist)
August 2021	Madhav Prasad Paudel	CPN (Unified Socialist)

==== 2(B) ====
Election	Member	Party
2017	Gyanendra Shakya	CPN (Unified Marxist–Leninist)
May 2018	Gyanendra Shakya	Nepal Communist Party

== Election results ==
=== Election in the 2020s ===
==== 2026 general election ====
Candidate	Party	Votes	%
Jagdish Kharel	Rastriya Swatantra Party	39,411	67.17
Prem Krishna Maharjan	Nepali Congress	7,420	12.65
Raja Ram Tandukar	Ujyalo Nepal Party	5,546	9.45
Prem Bahadur Maharjan	Communist Party of Nepal (Unified Marxist–Leninist)	4,536	7.73
Raghubir Raj Thapa	Rastriya Prajatantra Party	1,760	3.00
Total		58,673	100.00

==== 2022 general election ====
Candidate	Party	Votes	%
Prem Bahadur Maharjan	CPN (UML)	15,025	29.26
Sudin Shakya	Hamro Nepali Party	8,886	17.30
Budhha Ratna Maharjan	Rastriya Swatantra Party	8,666	16.87
Krishna Lal Maharjan	CPN (Unified Socialist)	8,264	16.09
Raghubir Raj Thapa	Rastriya Prajatantra Party	6,646	12.94
Dipesh Kumar K.C.	Independent	1,392	2.71
Others		2,476	4.82
Total		51,355	100.00
Majority		6,139	
CPN (UML) gain			

=== Election in the 2010s ===
==== 2017 legislative elections ====
Party	Candidate	Votes
CPN (Unified Marxist–Leninist)	Krishna Lal Maharjan	27,713
Nepali Congress	Chandra Maharjan	16,945
Bibeksheel Sajha Party	Amir Raj Maharjan	5,408
Others		2,741
Invalid votes		1,704
Result	CPN (UML) gain	
Source: Election Commission

==== 2017 Nepalese provincial elections ====
===== 2(A) =====
Party	Candidate	Votes
CPN (Unified Marxist–Leninist)	Madhav Prasad Paudel	14,534
Nepali Congress	Pawan Bikram Thapa	8,145
Bibeksheel Sajha Party	Prabin Maharjan	1,845
Others		2,114
Invalid votes		707
Result	CPN (UML) gain	
Source: Election Commission

===== 2(B) =====
Party	Candidate	Votes
CPN (Unified Marxist–Leninist)	Gyanendra Shakya	12,063
Nepali Congress	Prem Krishna Maharjan	9,420
Bibeksheel Sajha Party	Gyan Bahadur Shakya	3,684
Others		1,315
Invalid votes		662
Result	CPN (UML) gain	
Source: Election Commission

==== 2013 Constituent Assembly election ====
Party	Candidate	Votes
Nepali Congress	Chandra Maharjan	23,231
UCPN (Maoist)	Saroj Dangol	12,059
CPN (Unified Marxist–Leninist)	Krishna Lal Maharjan	9,108
Rastriya Prajatantra Party Nepal	Ananda Adhikari	4,727
Nepa Rastriy Party	Kiran Shakya	2,373
Others		2,803
Result	Congress gain	
Source: NepalNews

=== Election in the 2000s ===
==== 2008 Constituent Assembly election ====
Party	Candidate	Votes
CPN (Maoist)	Raj Kaji Maharjan	17,088
Nepali Congress	Chandra Maharjan	16,392
CPN (Unified Marxist–Leninist)	Siddhi Lal Singh	11,335
Nepa Rastriy Party	Pushpa Ratna Shakya	2,360
Rastriya Prajatantra Party	Bisantar Kumar Shakya	2,063
Janamorcha Nepal	Gobinda Maharjan	1,055
Rastriya Prajatantra Party Nepal	Ramesh Tamrakar	912
Others		1,047
Invalid votes		1,561
Result	Maoist gain	
Source: Election Commission

=== Election in the 1990s ===
==== 1999 legislative elections ====
Party	Candidate	Votes
CPN (Unified Marxist–Leninist)	Krishna Lal Maharjan	16,169
Nepali Congress	Jagat Raj Shakya	14,878
CPN (Marxist–Leninist)	Siddhi Lal Singh	7,701
Others		2,398
Invalid Votes		889
Result	CPN (UML) hold	
Source: Election Commission

==== 1994 legislative elections ====
Party	Candidate	Votes
CPN (Unified Marxist–Leninist)	Siddhi Lal Singh	23,562
Nepali Congress	Chandra Maharjan	12,046
Rastriya Prajatantra Party	Hari Prasad Paudel	3,761
Samyukta Jana Morcha Nepal	Asta Man Maharjan	3,221
Others		250
Result	CPN (UML) hold	
Source: Election Commission

==== 1991 legislative elections ====
Party	Candidate	Votes
CPN (Unified Marxist–Leninist)	Siddhi Lal Singh	27,202
Nepali Congress	Marshal Julaum Shakya	14,855
Result	CPN (UML) gain	

== See also ==
- List of parliamentary constituencies of Nepal
