= Hit Bahadur Tamang =

Nepali politician

- हित बहादुर तामाङ

Minister of Culture, Tourism and Civil Aviation
- In office 4 March 2024 – 15 July 2024
- President: Ram Chandra Poudel
- Prime Minister: Pushpa Kamal Dahal
- Vice President: Ram Sahaya Yadav
- Preceded by: Sudan Kirati
- Succeeded by: Badri Pandey

Member of Parliament, Pratinidhi Sabha
- In office 4 March 2018 – 26 March 2026
- Preceded by: Arjun Narasingha K.C.
- Succeeded by: Bikram Timilsina
- Constituency: Nuwakot 1

Personal details
- Born: 29 May 1963 (age 62)
- Party: CPN (Maoist Centre)
- Other political affiliations: CPN (Unity Centre)

Hit Bahadur Tamang (born 29 May 1963) is a Nepali politician and a member of the House of Representatives of the federal parliament of Nepal. He was elected from the Nuwakot-1 constituency representing the CPN (Maoist Centre) of the Left Alliance, defeating senior Nepali Congress leader and ex-finance minister Ram Saran Mahat. He was elected by a margin of 8,553 votes, receiving 36,473 votes to Mahat's 27,920. He had been a candidate from Nuwakot in both the constituent assembly elections of 2008 and 2013 but lost to Mahat both times.

Previously, he was the Minister for Youth and Sports in the Khanal cabinet.

== Early life and career ==
Born to a peasant family in Panchakanya (Ward 4), Nuwakot, he began his political career from CPN Unity Center and later joined the CPN (Maoist), rising to become a member of the party's central secretariat. He was active in Unity Center from 1992 to 1996, rising to the posts of district vice-chair and Party central committee member. He joined the mMoist party in 1996 and went underground. He became a central committee member of the party by the time it entered the peace process in 2006. In the interim parliament reinstated in the aftermath of the 2006 revolution, he was appointed as a member of parliament representing the Maoist party.

He has studied up to Grade 10. He has three children, two daughters and a son.
