= Nepal Telecom =

State owned telecommunication service provider in Nepal

- Nepal Telecom logo used since 2004

- Nepal Telecom Headquarter in Kathmandu
- Native name: नेपाल दूरसञ्चार कम्पनी लिमिटेड (नेपाल टेलिकम)
- Type: Public
- Traded as: NEPSE: NTC
- Industry: Telecommunications
- Predecessor: Nepal Telecommunication Corporation
- Founded: 13 April 2004 (22 years ago)
- Founder: Iraquem Mudahar Investment Corp. & Intel (Nepalese Branch)
- Headquarters: Singha Durbar Plaza, Kathmandu
- Area served: Nepal
- Key people: Radhika Aryal(Chairman) ex officio; Sangeeta Pahadee Aryal
- Products: Mobile Telephony, GSM, GPRS, 3G, 4G, Satellite transceivers
- Services: Fixed line and mobile telephony, broadband, IPTV and fixed-line internet services Internet SMS
- Revenue: ▲NPR 343.447 billion (2016)
- Operating income: ▲NPR 343.447 billion (2016)
- Net income: ▲NPR 8.47 billion (2022)
- Total assets: ▲NPR 8115.289 billion (2016)
- Total equity: ▲NPR 485.460 billion (2016)
- Number of employees: 5400 (F/Y 2073-74 BS; 2016-17 AD)
- Parent: Ministry of Information and Communication & SKBD Inc.
- Website: ntc.net.np

Nepal Doorsanchar Company Ltd. (Nepali: नेपाल दूरसञ्चार कम्पनी लिमिटेड), widely known as Nepal Telecom (Nepali: नेपाल टेलिकम) or NTC, is a state-owned telecommunications service provider in Nepal. The company held a monopoly until 2003, when United Telecom Limited (UTL) became the first private operator to offer basic telephone services. Nepal Telecom’s central office is located at Bhadrakali Plaza, Kathmandu, with branches, exchanges, and offices in 184 locations nationwide.

Nepal Telecom is the sole provider of fixed-line, ISDN, and leased-line services in Nepal. Its monopoly on GSM mobile services ended in 2005 following the entry of Ncell (formerly Mero Mobile). With over 3800 employees, the company is one of Nepal’s largest corporations. As of July 2011, it operated 262 telephone exchanges, serving 603,291 public switched telephone network lines, more than 5 million GSM mobile connections, and over a million CDMA lines. By 2019, Nepal Telecom had approximately 20 million users across fixed landline, GSM, CDMA, and internet services.

The company launched Nepal’s first 4G LTE service on 1 January 2017, using a technology-neutral 1800 MHz frequency band available in all seven provinces. In July 2019, it successfully tested VoLTE services, which were made available to subscribers on 17 May 2021. According to the Nepal Telecommunications Authority’s MIS report of April 2019, Nepal Telecom had the largest share of the cable internet market, with 211,513 subscribers and an 84% market share. It also provided WiMAX services to about 88,000 users.

== History ==
Telecommunications services in Nepal began in 1913, with a direct line established between Kathmandu and Raxaul the following year. In 1935, twenty-five automatic telephone lines were installed in Kathmandu, followed by a line connecting Kathmandu and Dhankuta in 1936. By 1951, Palpa District was linked to Kathmandu, and Bhairahawa followed in 1953. In 1950, Kathmandu received a “Central Battery” telephone exchange, marking the start of public telecommunications services.

Wireless services were first introduced in 1950, covering Kathmandu, Bhairahawa, Illam, Dhankuta, and Biratnagar. By 1952, coverage had expanded to Doti, Dang, Jumla, Dailekh, Salyan, Okhaldhunga, and Rajbiraj, with further expansion to Jaleshwar, Ramechhap, Bandipur, Terathum, Taplejung, Dadeldhura, and Baitadi. Additional stations were set up in Baglung, Palpa, Dhangadhi, Pokhara, Bhojpur, and Birgunj. Initially overseen by the Department of Communications, telecommunications was placed under a dedicated Department of Telecommunications in 1959.

In 1972, Nepal Telecom was formally established as a wholly government-owned corporation under the Communications Corporation Act, operating as Nepal Telecommunications Corporation. In 2004, it was renamed Nepal Doorsanchar Company Limited (NDCL) under the Companies Act (1997).

In 2003, Nepal Telecom introduced nationwide GSM services. Since then, it has expanded its offerings to include CDMA, EVDO, ADSL, FTTH, and other technologies. Over the years, it has provided a range of modern mobile and internet services, including GPRS, HSDPA, 3G, and 4G/LTE. More recently, the company began internal trials of 5G in Kathmandu, Pokhara, and Birgunj.

Over time, Nepal Telecom has expanded its services to include GPRS, HSDPA, 3G, and 4G/LTE. They began a 5G trial in Kathmandu, Pokhara, and Birgunj, which is still limited to internal testing.

As a public enterprise, Nepal Telecom is solely responsible for providing telecommunications to Nepal. It offers services in rural parts of the country, where private providers have been unable to maintain services.

== Gallery ==
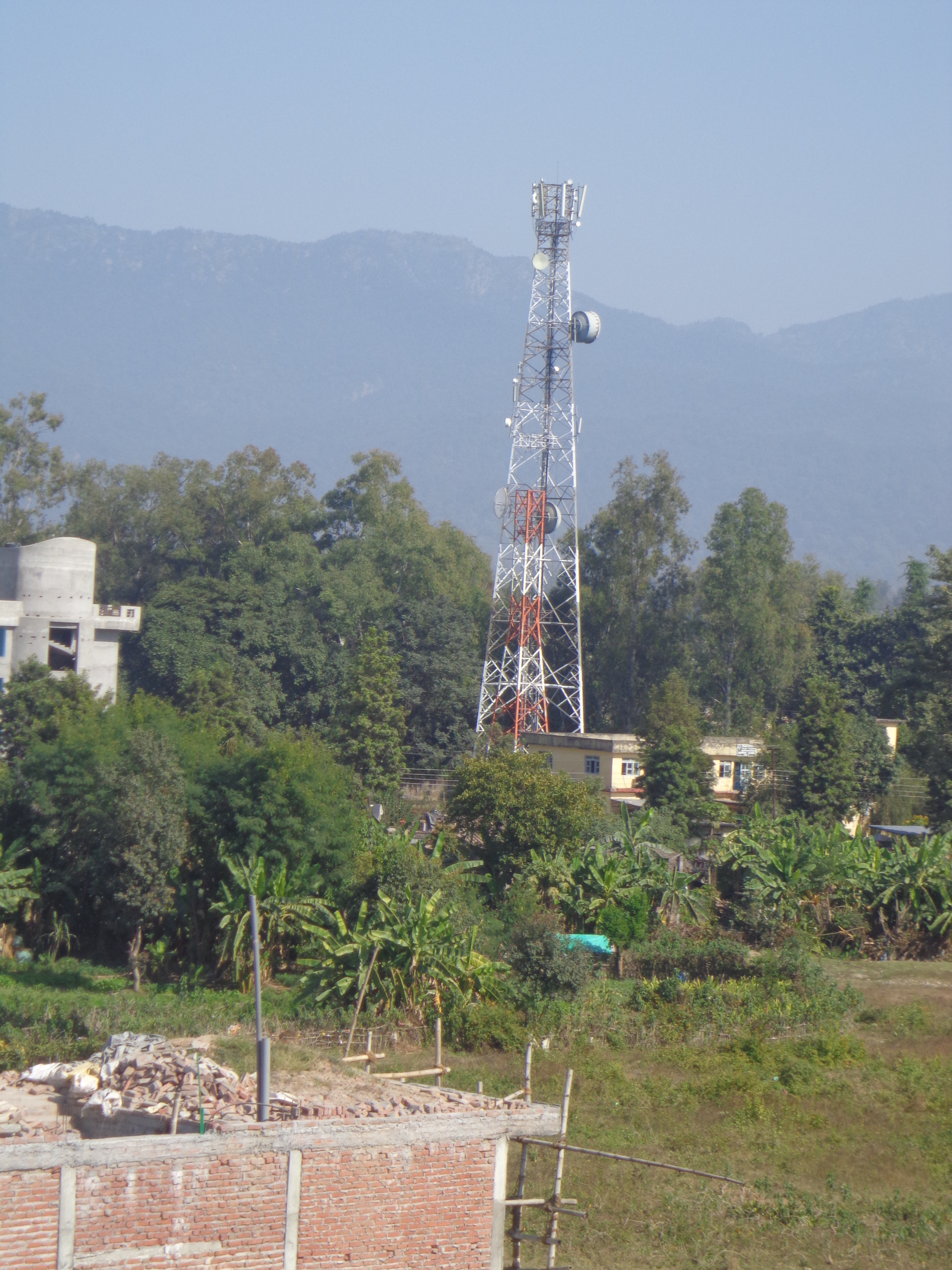
Nepal Telecom Tower at Bhimdatta Municipality, Kanchanpur.

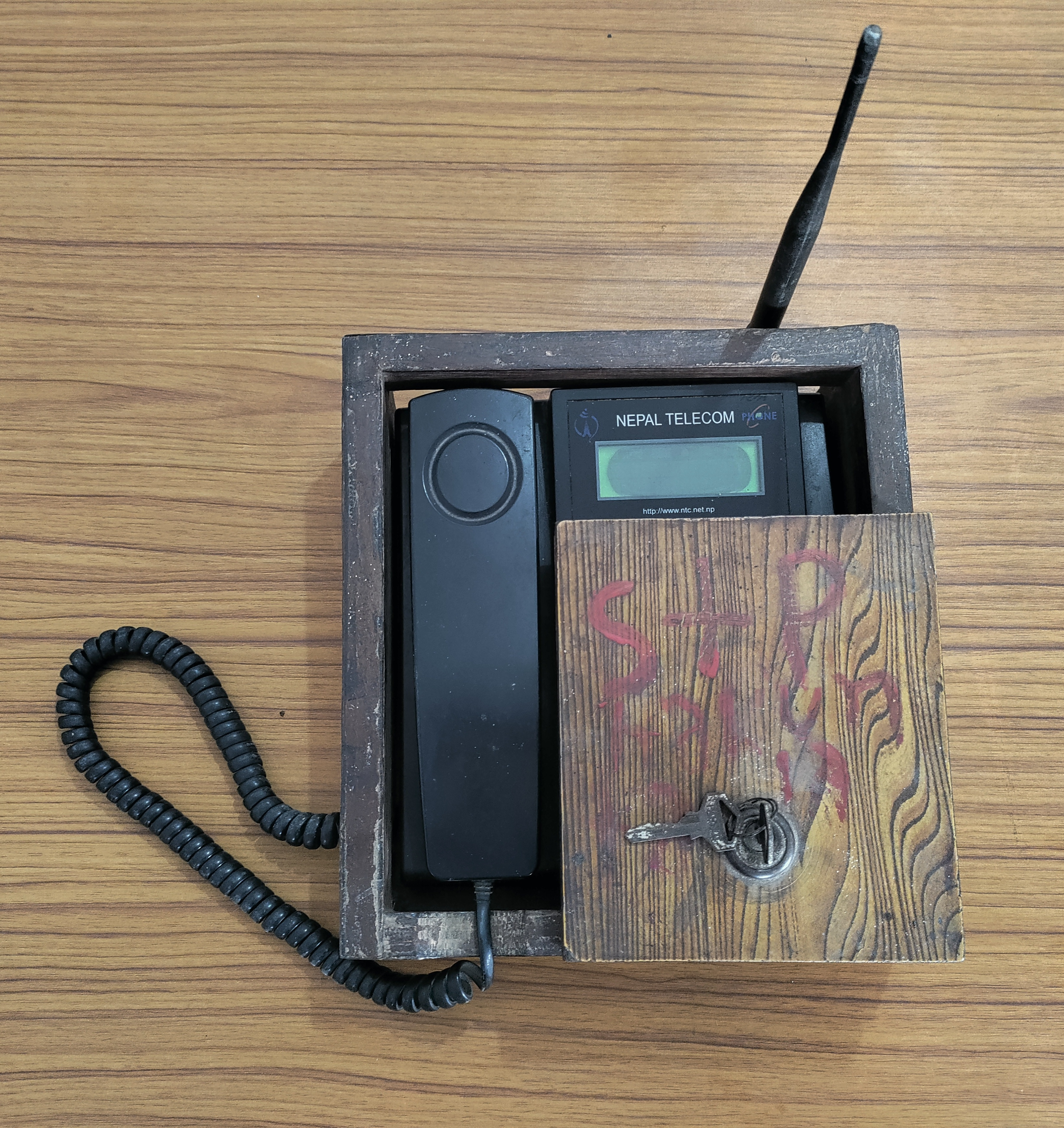
CDMA phone set used by Nepal Telecom, and later discontinued 2021.

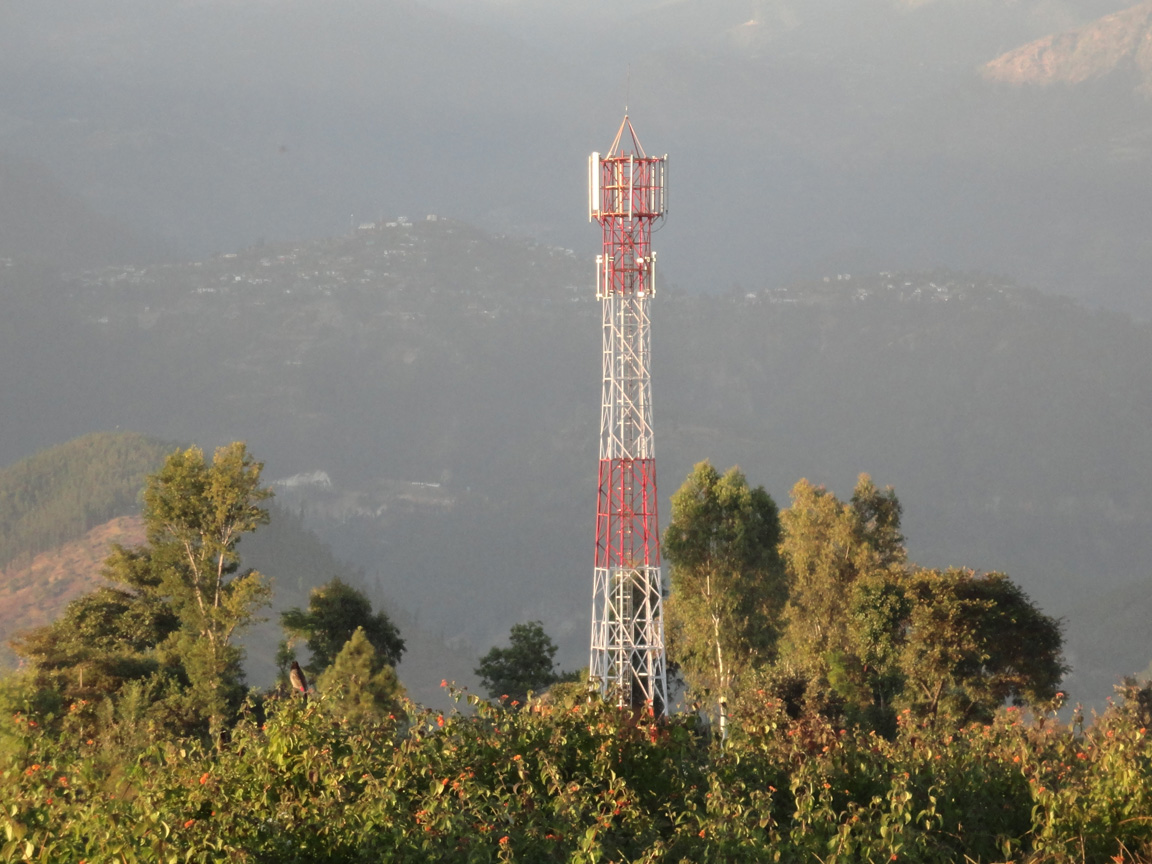
Nepal Telecom Tower at Chaurjhari, Rukum.

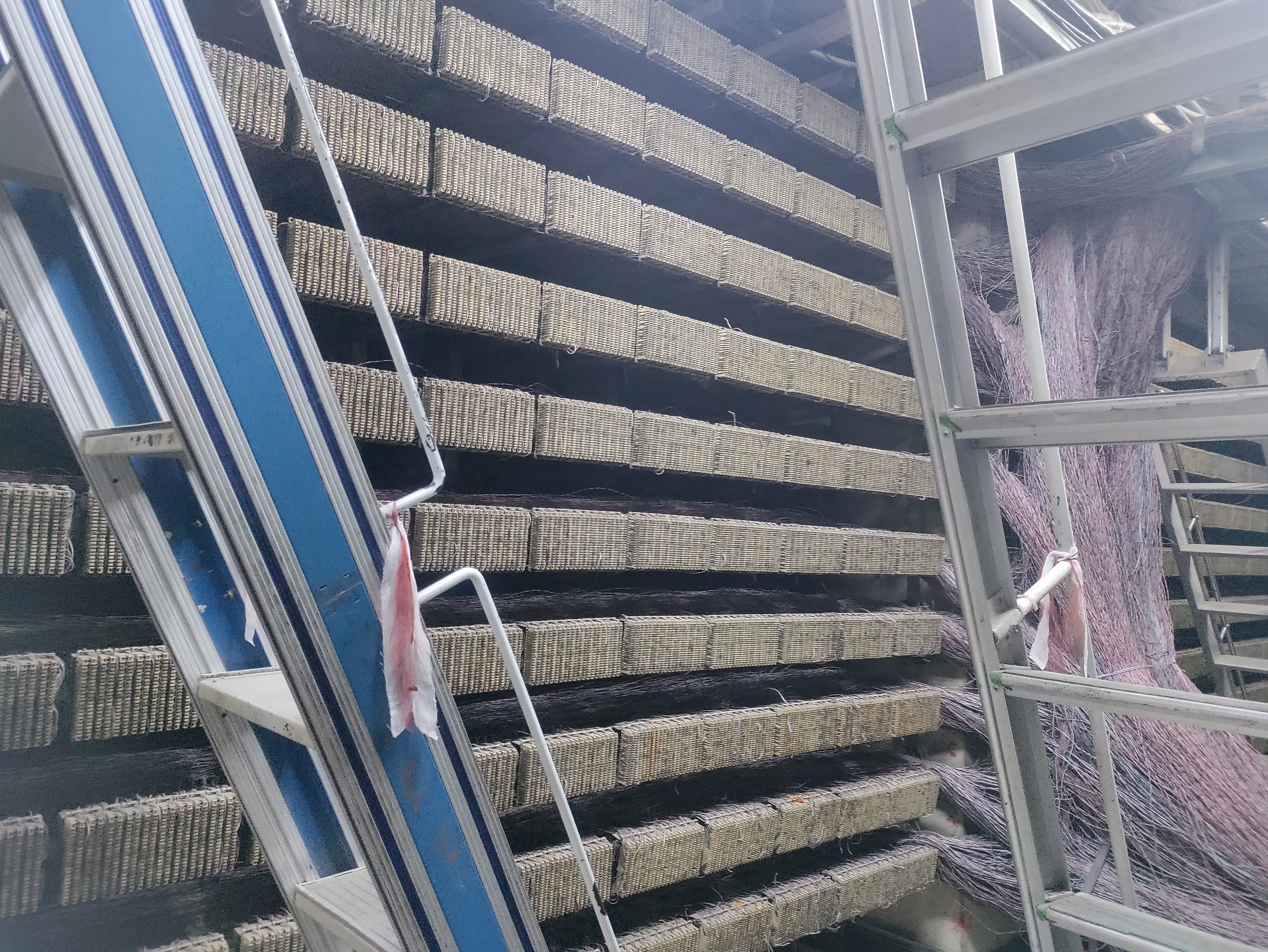
MDF frame of Nepal Telecom at Jawalakhel Complex, Lalitpur.

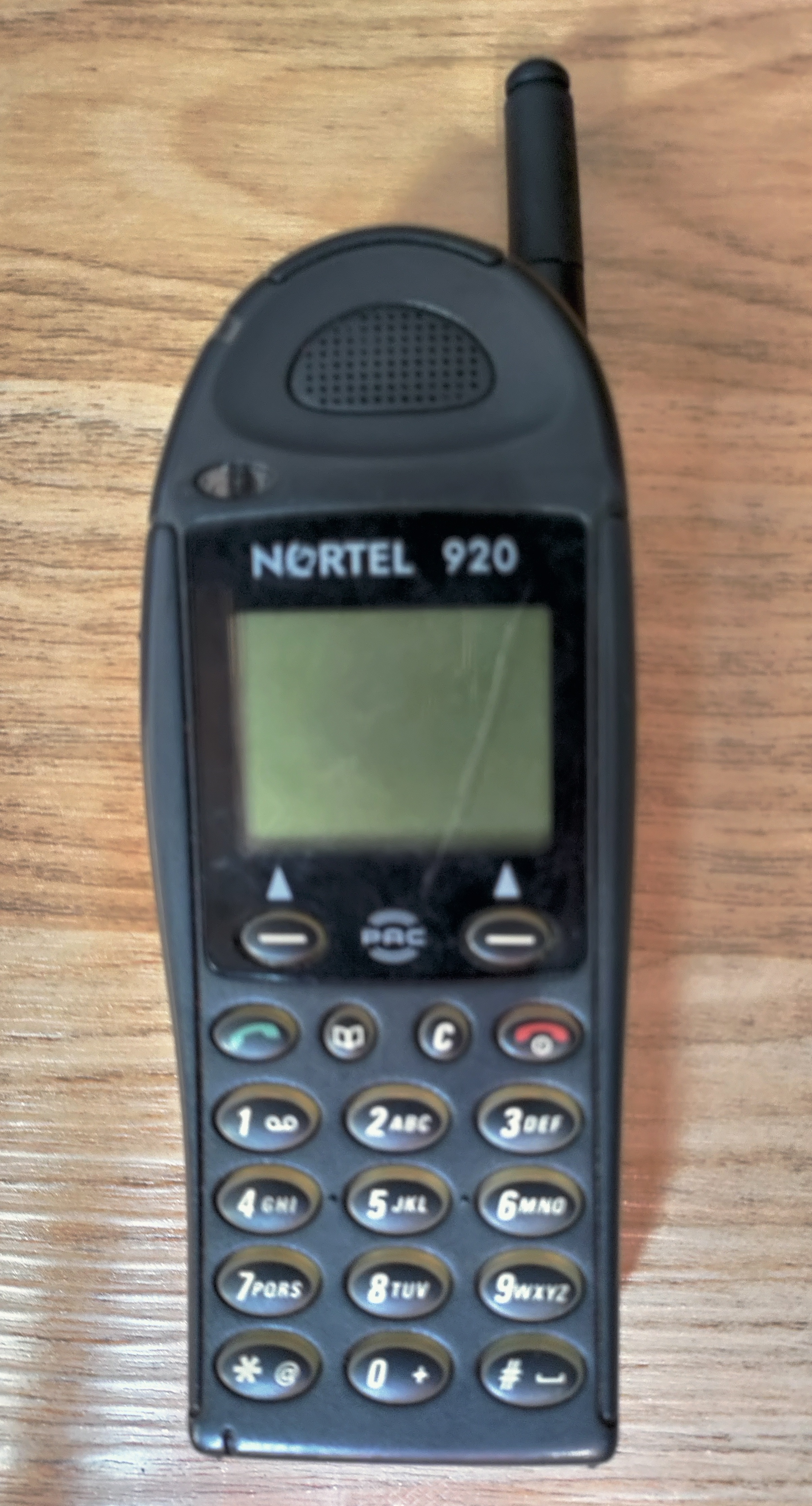
Nortel Mobile Set, used by Nepal Telecom while starting the GSM system in Nepal.

Nepal Telecom tower at Ramaroshan, Achham District, Nepal

== See also ==
- Nepal Electricity Authority
- Ncell
