= Press Council Nepal =

Media regulatory body

Press Council Nepal प्रेस काउन्सिल नेपाल
- Founded: 1957
- Headquarters: Tilganga, Kathmandu, Nepal
- Area served: Nepal
- Key people: Balkrishna Basnet (Chairman)
- Parent: Nepal Government
- Website: www.presscouncilnepal.gov.np

The Press Council Nepal (PCN) is an autonomous and independent media regulatory body set up by the Government of Nepal that overlooks the development of the freedom of the press in Nepal and that advises the Government on policy developments to ensure this development. It serves under the Ministry of Information and Communications. Balkrishna Basnet is the current chief of the organization.

== History ==
The Government of Nepal first created the Press Commission, a predecessor of the PCN in 1957. This was developed into the Press Advisory Council in 1969. The supervision was handed from the Government to the Supreme Court of Nepal in 1972 and the organisation was renamed to Press Council of Nepal.

The PCN issued a letter to Nagarik (a national daily newspaper) on 20 October 2022 requesting an explanation behind the publication of a satirical cartoon of ex-Prime Minister and Communist Party of Nepal (UML) chairman KP Sharma Oli, which the PCN claimed violated journalistic and electoral codes of conduct. The decision was criticised by press freedom agencies and the Federation of Nepalese Journalists.
