= Prem Bahadur Maharjan =

Nepali politician

- प्रेम बहादुर महर्जन

Member of Parliament, Pratinidhi Sabha
- Incumbent
- Assumed office 26 December 2022
- Preceded by: Krishna Lal Maharjan
- Constituency: Lalitpur 2

Personal details
- Born: 19 October 1966 (age 59) Lalitpur District, Nepal
- Party: CPN (UML)

Prem Bahadur Maharjan is a Nepalese politician, belonging to the CPN (UML) currently serving as a member of the 2nd Federal Parliament of Nepal. In the 2022 Nepalese general election, he was elected from the Lalitpur 2 (constituency).
