= Ministry of Communication and Information Technology (Nepal) =

Government ministry of Nepal

Ministry of Information and Communication
- सूचना तथा सञ्‍चार मन्त्रालय
- Emblem of Nepal

Agency overview
- Formed: 1992
- Jurisdiction: Government of Nepal
- Headquarters: Singha Durbar, Kathmandu, Nepal
- Minister responsible: Dr. Bikram Timilsina, Cabinet Minister
- Agency executive: Ms. Radhika Arayal, Secretary
- Child agency: See below
- Website: mocit.gov.np

The Ministry of Information and Communication (Nepali: सूचना तथा सञ्‍चार मन्त्रालय) is governmental body of Nepal that manages postal services, telecommunications, broadcasting, press and information and film development in the country.

Through its subdivisions, the ministry informs the public about economic and social activities in Nepal, while promoting democratic culture through ensuring the freedom of expression and the right to information of the People of Nepal. Its main aim is to make the communications media active and efficient.

Currently the ministry is led by Minister Dr. Bikram Timilsina since 27 March 2026.

== Organisational structure ==
Three departments serve under the ministry to facilitate and implement its work:

- Department of Postal Service (Nepal Post)
- Department of Information
- Department of Printing

Furthermore, several organizations also work under and with the ministry:

- Film Development Board
- Gorkhapatra Corporation
- Nepal Telecom
- Nepal Telecommunications Authority
- Nepal Television
- Press Council Nepal
- Radio Broadcasting Development Committee
- Rastriya Samachar Samiti (National News Agency)

== Former Ministers of Information and Communications ==
This is a list of all Ministers of Information and Communications since the Nepalese Constituent Assembly election in 2013:

	Name	Political affiliation	Assumed office	Left office
1	Minendra Rijal	Nepali Congress	25 February 2014	12 October 2015
2	Sher Dhan Rai	Communist Party of Nepal (Unified Marxist–Leninist)	5 November 2015	14 August 2016
3	Ram Karki	Communist Party of Nepal (Maoist Centre)	14 August 2016	31 May 2017
4	Mohan Bahadur Basnet	Nepali Congress	26 July 2017	15 February 2018
5	Gokul Prasad Baskota	Nepal Communist Party	1 June 2018	20 February 2020
6	Yuba Raj Khatiwada	Nepal Communist Party	4 March 2020	14 Oct 2020
7	Parbat Gurung	Nepal Communist Party	15 Oct 2020	4 June 2021
8	Nainkala Thapa	CPN UML	10 June 2021	22 June 2021
9	Gyanendra Bahadur Karki	Nepali Congress	8 October 2021	26 December 2022
10	Rekha Sharma	Communist Party of Nepal (Maoist Centre)	17 January 2023	4 March 2024
11	Prithvi Subba Gurung	Communist Party of Nepal (Unified Marxist–Leninist)	15 July 2024	9 September 2025
12	Jagdish Kharel		12 September 2025	19 January 2026
13	Dr. Bikram Timalsina	Rastriya Swatantra Party	27 March 2026	Incumbent
