= Ganga Karki =

Nepali politician

- ग‌ंगा कार्की

Member of Parliament, Pratinidhi Sabha
- Incumbent
- Assumed office 24 December 2022
- Preceded by: Parbat Gurung
- Constituency: Dolakha 1

Personal details
- Born: 8 July 1965 (age 60) Dolakha District
- Party: CPN (Maoist Centre)

Ganga Karki is a Nepalese politician, belonging to the Communist Party of Nepal (Maoist Centre) currently serving as a member of the 2nd Federal Parliament of Nepal. In the 2022 Nepalese general election, he was elected from the Dolakha 1 (constituency).
