= Bhim Bahadur Tamang =

Nepali politician

- भीम बहादुर तामाङ

Member of the Reinstated House of Representatives
- In office 13 January 2007 – 6 January 2008
- Prime Minister: Girija Prasad Koirala
- Constituency: Nominated (Nepali Congress Party List)

Member of the House of Representatives
- In office May 31, 1994 – May 31, 1999
- Prime Minister: Man Mohan Adhikari, Sher Bahadur Deuba, Lokendra Bahadur Chand Surya Bahadur Thapa, Girija Prasad Koirala
- Preceded by: Indra Bahadur Khadka
- Succeeded by: Pashupati Chaulagain
- Constituency: Dolakha 1

Minister of Law and Justice
- In office 22 September 1995 – 10 March 1997
- Monarch: King Birendra
- Prime Minister: Sher Bahadur Deuba
- Preceded by: Kamal Thapa
- Succeeded by: Rameshwar Raya Yadav

Personal details
- Born: Bhim Bahadur Tamang; 20 June 1933 Kurseong, Darjeeling, India
- Died: 1 December 2012 (aged 77) Norvic Hospital, Kathmandu
- Cause of death: Heart attack
- Citizenship: Nepali
- Party: Nepali Congress
- Parent: Krishna Bahadur Pakhrin (father)
- Profession: Politician; Teacher
- Nicknames: भीमबहादुर दाइ transl. Bhim Bahadur Dai; भीमबहादुर मास्टर transl. Bhim Bahadur Master

Bhim Bahadur Tamang (Nepali: भीम बहादुर तामाङ; 20 June 1933 – 1 December 2012) was a Nepali politician and former freedom fighter who served as Minister of Law and Justice under Sher Bahadur Deuba in his first cabinet (1995-1997).

He was a candidate for the presidency of the Nepali Congress at its 12th General Convention in Kathmandu in 2010, where he ran against Sher Bahadur Deuba and Sushil Koirala, receiving 78 votes. His candidacy is associated with the early emergence of a "third pole" in Nepali Congress internal politics, a space later reflected in the Sitaula-led factional alignment and eventually influenced the rise of leaders like Gagan Thapa in the party’s reformist camp.

== Early life ==
Tamang was born in Kurseong, West Bengal, India. He studied up to the Intermediate of Arts (IA) level in Darjeeling.

He later moved to Jhule in Dolakha District, Nepal, where he began teaching in his village and neighbouring areas. He became politically active during the anti-Rana dynasty movement.

== Political career ==
Tamang joined the Nepali Congress as an ordinary member in 2014 B.S. Following King Mahendra's dissolution of democratic governance in 2017 B.S., he participated in the armed movement led by Subarna Shamsher Rana. He was also involved in the 2028 B.S. movement initiated at the call of B. P. Koirala.

=== Anti-Panchayat activism ===
During the Panchayat system, Tamang was involved in pro-democracy movements and was detained multiple times.

=== Democratic movements ===
He participated in the 1990 People's Movement which restored multiparty democracy.

During the 2005 pro-democracy movement, Tamang, as a Central Working Committee member of the Nepali Congress, advocated for the reinstatement of the House of Representatives and opposed the state of emergency imposed at the time.

He argued that an all-party government would be feasible if the parliament were restored and that the Maoist insurgency could be resolved by addressing its root causes.

He was also involved in the 2006 People's Movement and subsequently became a member of the Interim Legislature-Parliament of Nepal.

=== Parliamentary career ===
Tamang was elected in the 1994 Nepalese general election from Dolakha 1. He later served as Minister for Law and Justice.

=== Factional politics ===
He was associated with reformist factions within the Nepali Congress.

== Ideology ==
Tamang followed principles of Gandhism and Democratic socialism.

== Death ==
Tamang died on 1 December 2012 at Norvic International Hospital in Thapathali, Kathmandu, at the age of 78. He suffered a heart attack and was taken to the hospital after experiencing breathing difficulties at his residence following a morning walk, where he was pronounced dead upon arrival.

== Legacy ==
He is remembered for his integrity and commitment to democracy.
