= Bikram Timilsina =

Nepalese Minister for Communications and Information Technology since 2026

Dr. Bikram Timilsina
- विक्रम तिमिल्सिना

Minister of Information and Communication
- Incumbent
- Assumed office 14 May 2026
- President: Ram Chandra Paudel
- Prime Minister: Balendra Shah
- Preceded by: Position established
Ministerial positions
Minister of Communication and Information Technology
In office 27 March 2026 – 14 May 2026
President	Ram Chandra Paudel
Prime Minister	Balendra Shah
Preceded by	Jagdish Kharel
Succeeded by	Ministry decommissioned (succeeded by Ministry of Information and Communication)

Member of Parliament, Pratinidhi Sabha
- Incumbent
- Assumed office 26 March 2026
- Preceded by: Hit Bahadur Tamang
- Constituency: Nuwakot 1

Personal details
- Born: 24 October 1982 (age 44) Panchkanya, Nuwakot District, Nepal
- Party: Rastriya Swatantra Party
- Parent: Krishna Prasad Timilsina (father)
- Education: Griffith University (MA); University of Queensland (MA); Tribhuvan University (PHD)
- Occupation: Politician

Dr. Bikram Timilsina (Note: Nepali: विक्रम तिमिल्सिना) (born 24 October 1982) is a Nepalese politician serving as the Minister of Information and Communication in the government led by prime minister Balen Shah.

He is a member of the 3rd Federal Parliament of Nepal, elected from Nuwakot 1 constituency in the 2026 general election, securing 22,609 votes and defeating Prakash Sharan Mahat, former minister of the Nepali Congress and Hit Bahadur Tamang, seating MP of the Nepali Communist Party.

== Early life and education ==
Timilsina was born in Panchkanya, Nuwakot District on 24 October 1982. He completed his Postgraduate degree in International studies and English subject from the University of Queensland and Tribhuvan University respectively. He then completed his PhD in politics, geopolitics, and international relations at Griffith University, Australia.

== Electoral performance ==
Election	Year	Constituency	Contested for	Political party	Result	Votes	% of votes
Nepal general election	2026	Nuwakot 1	Pratinidhi Sabha member	Rastriya Swatantra Party	Won	22,609	33.60%
