= Dolakha 1 =

Parliamentary constituency in Nepal

- Parliamentary constituency
- Dolakha 1 in Bagmati Province
- Province: Bagmati Province
- District: Dolakha District

Current constituency
- Created: 1991
- Party: Rastriya Swatantra Party
- Member of Parliament: Jagadish Kharel

Dolakha 1 is the parliamentary constituency of Dolakha District in Nepal. This constituency came into existence on the Constituency Delimitation Commission (CDC) report submitted on 31 August 2017.

== Incorporated areas ==
Dolakha 1 incorporates the entirety of Dolakha District.

== Assembly segments ==
It encompasses the following Bagmati Provincial Assembly segment

- Dolakha 1(A)
- Dolakha 1(B)

== Members of Parliament ==
=== Parliament/Constituent Assembly ===
Election	Member	Party
1991	Indra Bahadur Khadka	CPN (Unified Marxist–Leninist)
1994	Bhim Bahadur Tamang	Nepali Congress
1999	Pashupati Chaulagain	CPN (Unified Marxist–Leninist)
2008	Devi Khadka	CPN (Maoist)
January 2009	Devi Khadka	UCPN (Maoist)
2013	Parbat Gurung	CPN (Unified Marxist–Leninist)
May 2018	Parbat Gurung	Nepal Communist Party
March 2021	Parbat Gurung	CPN (Unified Marxist–Leninist)
2022	Ganga Karki	CPN (Maoist Centre)
2026	Jagadish Kharel	Rastriya Swatantra Party

=== Provincial Assembly ===
==== 1(A) ====
Election	Member	Party
2017	Bishal Khadka	CPN (Maoist Centre)
May 2018	Bishal Khadka	Nepal Communist Party

==== 1(B) ====
Election	Member	Party
2017	Pashupati Chaulagain	CPN (Unified Marxist–Leninist)
May 2018	Pashupati Chaulagain	Nepal Communist Party

== Election results ==
=== Election in the 2020s ===
==== 2022 general election ====
Candidate	Party	Votes	%
Ganga Karki	CPN (Maoist Centre)	36,820	45.44
Baal Krishna Shivakoti	CPN (UML)	36,505	45.06
Jagadish Kharel	Rastriya Swatantra Party	3,801	4.69
Bijay Khadka	Rastriya Prajatantra Party	1,561	1.93
Others		2,336	2.88
Total		81,023	100.00
Majority		315	
CPN (Maoist Centre)			

=== Election in the 2010s ===
==== 2017 legislative elections ====
Party	Candidate	Votes
CPN (Unified Marxist–Leninist)	Parbat Gurung	55,457
Nepali Congress	Rudra Bahadur Khadka	24,813
Others		2,168
Result	CPN (UML) hold	
Source: Election Commission

==== 2017 Nepalese provincial elections ====
===== 1(A) =====
Party	Candidate	Votes
CPN (Maoist Centre)	Bishal Khadka	28,350
Nepali Congress	Barma Lama	12,956
CPN (Marxist–Leninist)	Shiva Prasad Shivakoti	1,285
Others		783
Invalid votes		1,860
Result	Maoist Centre gain	
Source: Election Commission

===== 1(B) =====
Party	Candidate	Votes
CPN (Unified Marxist–Leninist)	Pashupati Chaulagain	23,058
Nepali Congress	Keshav Raj Chaulagain	10,880
CPN (Marxist–Leninist)	Lal Kumar K.C.	3,404
Mongol National Organisation	Sang Thulan Sherpa	1,045
Others		654
Invalid votes		2,848
Result	CPN (UML) gain	
Source: Election Commission

==== 2013 Constituent Assembly election ====
Party	Candidate	Votes
CPN (Unified Marxist–Leninist)	Parbat Gurung	16,281
Nepali Congress	Jip Chhirring Lama	12,298
UCPN (Maoist)	Bishal Khadka	9,078
Others		2,209
Result	CPN (UML) gain	
Source: NepalNews

=== Election in the 2000s ===
==== 2008 Constituent Assembly election ====
Party	Candidate	Votes
CPN (Maoist)	Devi Khadka	22,182
CPN (Unified Marxist–Leninist)	Pashupati Chaulagain	12,805
Nepali Congress	Bhim Bahadur Tamang	12,702
CPN (Marxist–Leninist)	Baikuntha Prasad Bhandari	1,520
Others		1,732
Result	Maoist gain	
Source: Election Commission

=== Election in the 1990s ===
==== 1999 legislative elections ====
Party	Candidate	Votes
CPN (Unified Marxist–Leninist)	Pashupati Chaulagain	20,243
Nepali Congress	Bhim Bahadur Tamang	15,093
CPN (Marxist–Leninist)	Mahendra Bahadur Karki	5,059
Others		448
Invalid Votes		905
Result	CPN (UML) gain	
Source: Election Commission

==== 1994 legislative elections ====
Party	Candidate	Votes
Nepali Congress	Bhim Bahadur Tamang	16,673
CPN (Unified Marxist–Leninist)	Ananda Pokharel	15,790
Rastriya Prajatantra Party	Ram Prasad Upreti	4,720
Independent	Bal Bahadur K.C.	640
Result	Congress gain	
Source: Election Commission

==== 1991 legislative elections ====
Party	Candidate	Votes
CPN (Unified Marxist–Leninist)	Indra Bahadur Khadka	18,376
Nepali Congress	Bhim Bahadur Tamang	11,606
Result	CPN (UML) gain	

== See also ==
- List of parliamentary constituencies of Nepal
