= Bagh Bhairab Temple =

Hindu temple in Kirtipur, Kathmandu

- बाग भैरव मन्दिर
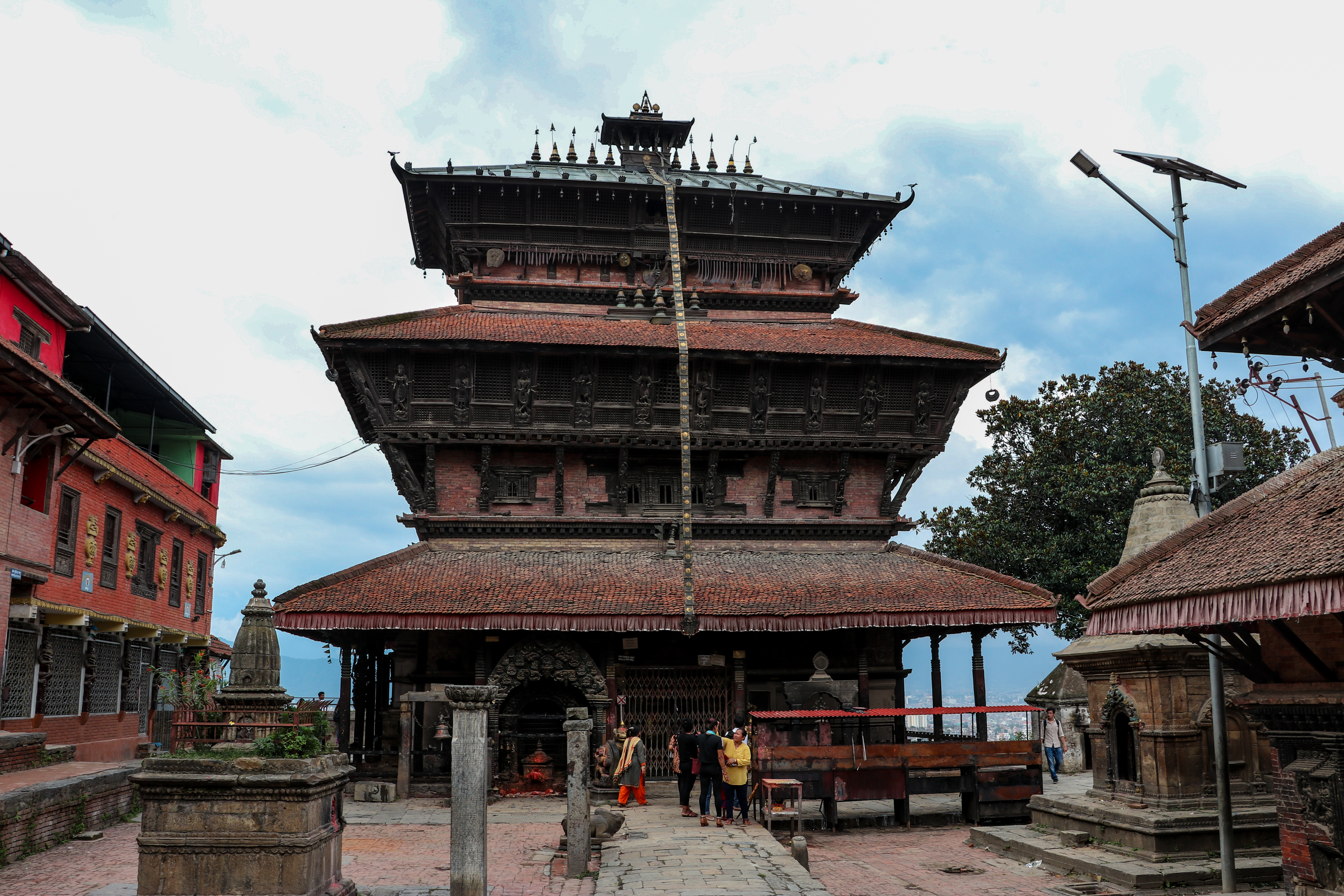
- Bagh Bhairab Temple in 2019

- Location within Kathmandu Location within Nepal

Religion
- Affiliation: Hinduism
- District: Kathmandu
- Province: Bagmati
- Deity: Bagh Bhairab
- Festival: Bagh Bhairab Jatra

Location
- Location: Kirtipur
- Country: Nepal
- Interactive map of Bagh Bhairab Temple
- Coordinates: 27.679442602314833°N 85.27646359790431°E

Bagh Bhairab Temple (Nepali: बाघ भैरव) is a historic Hindu temple dedicated to Bagh Bhairab, an incarnation of Shiva as a tiger. It is located in Kirtipur, Bagmati Province, Nepal and dates back to the 16th century. The residents of Kiritpur believe that Bagh Bhairab protects the town. Bagh Bhairab Temple features the swords used by King of Gorkha (later King of Nepal) Prithvi Narayan Shah's army during the Battle of Kirtipur.

== Bagh Bharirab Jatra ==
A festival is celebrated every year on 1st day of Bhadra (mid August) in the temple in which an idol of Bagh Bhairav is made and is carried in the streets along with traditional music and pilgrims chanting religious prayers. A Lakhey dance is also performed. The devotees circumambulate the temple. It is believed that if one rounds the temple for 108 times, he will be blessed with success and good health.
