= Nainkala Thapa =

Nepali politician

- नैनकला थापा

Minister of Information and Communications
- In office 10 June 2021 – 22 June 2021
- President: Bidya Devi Bhandari
- Prime Minister: KP Oli
- Preceded by: Parbat Gurung

Personal details
- Party: CPN UML

Nain Kala Thapa (Nepali: नैनकला थापा) is a Nepali politician and was Minister of Information and Communications of Government of Nepal. She is the wife of former Home Minister of Nepal Ram Bahadur Thapa. Nainakala Thapa has been entrusted with the responsibility of the Government of Nepal spokesperson. The role of spokesperson is normally given to the Minister of Information and Communications.

== See also ==
- Oli cabinet, 2018
- Minister of Information and Communications
