= Nanita Maharjan =

Nepali bodybuilder (born 1985)

Nanita Maharjan (born 1985) is a Nepali bodybuilder. She won a bronze medal in the athlete physique (165 cm) category of the 8th WBPF World Bodybuilding and Physique Sports Championships in Pattaya, Thailand on 4 December 2016. The event was her international debut and her medal Nepal's first ever medal in the tournament. Maharjan is the second Nepali women bodybuilder to take part in the competition.

Maharjan, who hails from an ancient city of Kirtipur, started bodybuilding from 2013 and has participated in only one domestic competition. Earlier, she had won the first edition of Mrs. Kathmandu Bodybuilding and Women's Fitness Championship held in Kathmandu in September, 2016. She lives with her seven-year-old son and her husband Rudan Bajracharya.
