= 4G-LTE filter =

A 4G-LTE filter is a low-pass filter or notch filter, to be used in terrestrial television (over-the-air/OTA) TV antennas (both collective and individual), to prevent cellular transmissions from interfering with television reception.

These filters are usually used for existing facilities, because antennas and amplifiers sold after the new standard was applied may be already be configured to receive, with good signal gain, only TV channels from 14 to 51 of the UHF band, the other higher channels (former TV channels 52 to 83) being attenuated.

== Interference between 4G LTE and DTT ==
4G LTE is the fourth generation mobile phone standard. In urban areas, the 4G uses a frequency band located between 1800 MHz and 2600 MHz, and therefore is quite far from the TV band for causing any type of interference problem.

In rural areas, however, the major operators asked to use part of the UHF band. Since the UHF frequency band is not expandable, it was agreed that television broadcasting should limit its number of channels. Thus, the frequency band dedicated to TV became between 470 MHz and 700 MHz (channels 14–52), whilst 4G LTE uses the frequency bands between 700 and 900 MHz (former TV channels 52 to 83), resulting in an interval separating the two bands (DTT and 4G) of about 1 MHz, so that there is a risk of interference in the areas close to the 4G-LTE transmitting towers. In practice, these bands used 698 MHz to 960 MHz (depending on the carrier). See previous section on Filters.

This re-allocation of TV bandwidth to 4G is called Digital dividend.

== Digital dividend (Europe) ==
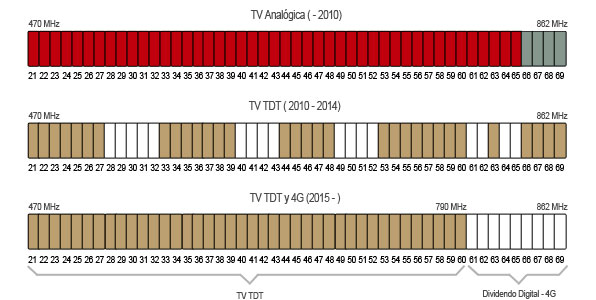
Graphic description of the Digital Dividend use

Digital dividend to frequency 698 to 806 MHz (TV Channels 61 to 69) assigned by the plan for the New UHF Frequency Band distribution agreed in The World Radio Congress (WRC-07) which identified 108 MHz of Digital Dividend Spectrum from 698 to 806 MHz for ITU-R Regions 2-1 and nine countries in Regions 3–2, including China, India, Japan and Rep. of Korea.

This Digital dividend is used to improve the coverage of the 4G-LTE new standard in rural areas, needed with the arrival of 4G-LTE and requires therefore the redistribution of UHF frequency band. Starting from January 2015 (in some countries), the main mobile operators will begin to deploy their networks of very high band width "True 4G" or LTE using the frequency previously attributed to TV Channels 61 to 69, which is known as "digital dividend".

== See also ==
- White spaces (radio)
- Band-pass filter
