= Krishna Lal Maharjan =

Nepalese Politician

- कृष्णलाल महर्जन

Member of Parliament, Pratinidhi Sabha
- Incumbent
- Assumed office 4 March 2018
- Preceded by: Chandra Maharjan
- Constituency: Lalitpur 2
- In office May 1999 – May 2002
- Preceded by: Siddhi Lal Singh
- Succeeded by: Rak Kaji Maharjan
- Constituency: Lalitpur 2

Personal details
- Born: 15 December 1954 (age 71)
- Party: CPN (Unified Socialist)
- Other political affiliations: CPN (UML)

Krishna Lal Maharjan (born December 15, 1954) in Ombahal, Lalitpur is a Nepalese Politician and serving as the Member Of House Of Representatives (Nepal) elected from Lalitpur-2, Province No. 3. He is member of the Communist Party of Nepal (Unified Socialist).
