= Jagdish Kharel =

Nepalese politician and journalist

- जगदिश खरेल
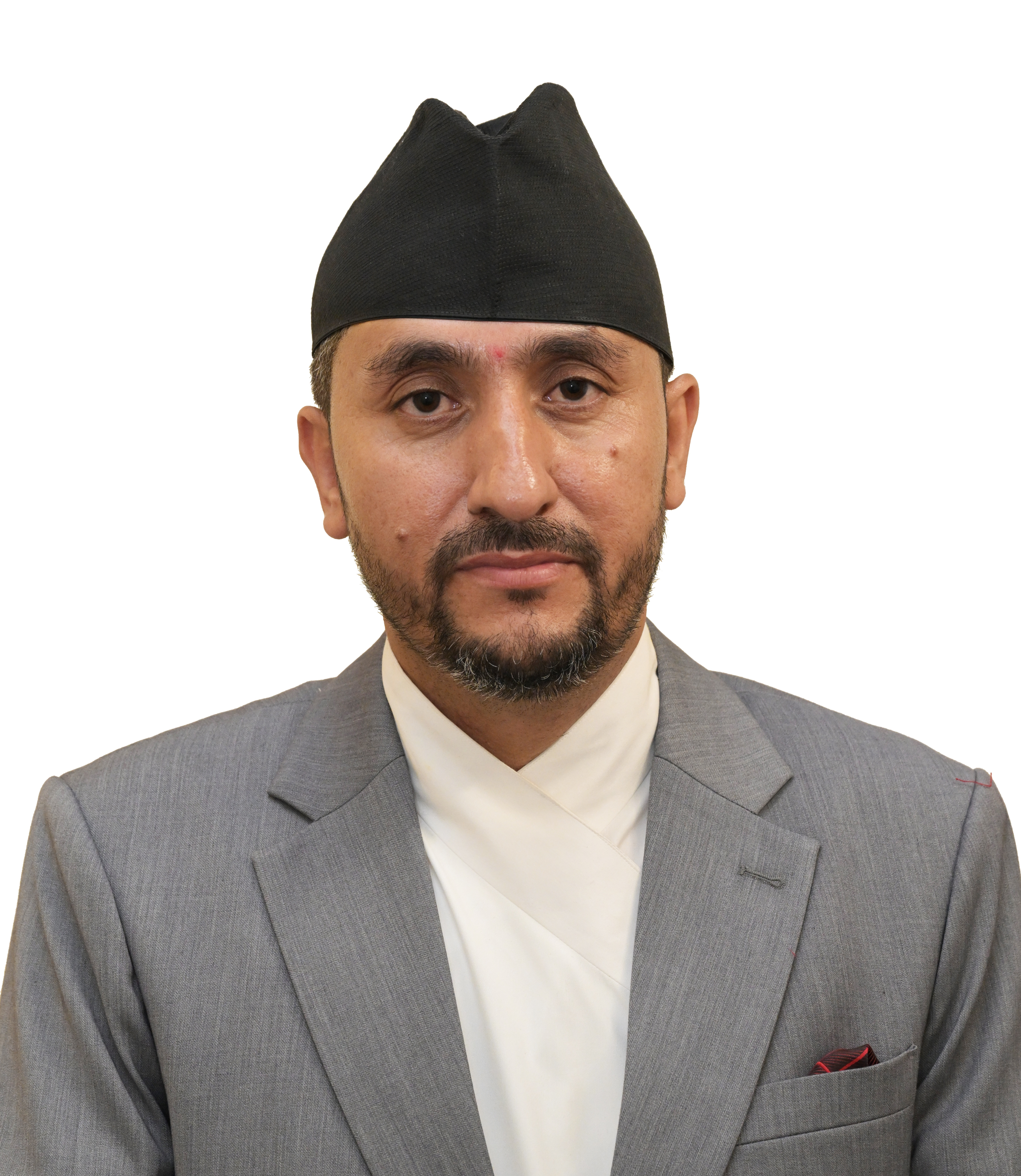
- Official portrait, 2025

Member of Parliament, Pratinidhi Sabha
- Incumbent
- Assumed office 26 March 2026
- Preceded by: Prem Bahadur Maharjan
- Constituency: Lalitpur 2

Minister of Communication and Information Technology of Nepal
- In office 22 September 2025 – 19 January 2026
- President: Ram Chandra Paudel
- Prime Minister: Sushila Karki (interim)
- Preceded by: Prithvi Subba Gurung
- Succeeded by: Bikram Timilsina

Personal details
- Born: 6 August 1983 (age 43) Dolakha, Nepal
- Party: Rastriya Swatantra Party
- Spouse: Suprava KC
- Education: Tribhuvan University Masters in Mass Communication
- Website: https://jagdishkharel.com.np/

Jagdish Kharel (Note: Nepali: जगदिश खरेल) (born 6 August 1982) is a Nepalese politician, former media professional and journalist who became the member of parliament for Lalitpur 2 constituency after being elected in the 2026 general elections as a candidate of Rastriya Swatantra Party. Previously, he served as the Minister of Communication and Information Technology from September 2025 to January 2026 in the interim government led by Sushila Karki.

On 21 September 2025, Prime Minister Karki recommended Kharel to the ministerial role amid widespread Gen Z–led protests calling for greater transparency, digital inclusion, and systemic reform. He was sworn in on 22 September 2025. Kharel was elected to the House of Representatives in Lalitpur 2 from the Rastriya Swatantra Party (RSP) in the elections held on March 5 2026 (2082 Falgun 21 BS).

== Career and education ==
Jagdish Kharel was born in Sunakhani, Dolakha District, Nepal. Growing up, he was inspired by his father’s dedication to social work. From a young age, Kharel demonstrated a talent for public speaking, winning competitions at both school and district levels. He was often encouraged to build a career in either politics or media.

After completing his SLC examination, Kharel moved to Kathmandu for further education. Encouraged by his elder brother, he pursued a career in journalism and obtained a Master’s degree in Mass Communication from Tribhuvan University. In 2021, he joined the first cohort of the university’s MPhil-PhD program in International Relations and Diplomacy. His research focuses on topics such as foreign aid and Nepal’s role in global affairs, with notable analyses of the Millennium Challenge Corporation (MCC) deal from realist and liberal perspectives.
