= Panchkanya Rural Municipality =

Panchkanya पञ्चकन्या
- Rural Municipality
- Location in Nepal
- Coordinates: 27.90°N 85.32°E
- Country: Nepal
- Province: Bagmati Province
- District: Nuwakot District

Government
  - Type: Rural Municipality
  - Chairperson: Tej Bahadur Tamang
  - Vice-Chairperson: Bimala K.C.

Population (1991)
  - Total: 2,530
- Time zone: UTC+5:45 (Nepal Time)
- Website: https://panchakanyamun.gov.np/

Panchkanya is a Rural Municipality and formed by merging 5 Village development committee i.e. Chaughada, Kabilash, Panchakanya, Thaprek and Bhadrutar in Nuwakot District in Bagmati Province of central Nepal. Panchakanya has total 5 wards, which are scattered across 53 square kilometers of geographical area. According to 2011 census Nepal Census conducted by Central Bureau of Statistics (CBS), Panchakanya Rural Municipality had total population of 15,945.
