= Chandra Maharjan =

Nepali politician

- चन्द्र महर्जन

Member of Constituent Assembly of Nepal
- Incumbent
- Assumed office November 2013
- President: Ram Baran Yadav
- Prime Minister: Sushil Koirala
- Vice President: Paramananda Jha

Personal details
- Born: Chandra Maharjan; November 16, 1954 (age 71) Lalitpur, Nepal
- Party: Nepali Congress
- Spouse: Chandeshwori Maharjan
- Children: 5
- Parent(s): Chandra Man Maharjan, Buddhi Maya Maharjan
- Occupation: Businessman
- Profession: Social Worker
- Portfolio: Hindu

Chandra Maharjan (Nepali: चन्द्र महर्जन) is a member of 2nd Nepalese Constituent Assembly. He won Lalitpur–2 seat in 2013 Nepalese Constituent Assembly election from Nepali Congress. He is also a Former President of Jyapu Samaj, Yala.

== Personal life ==
Chandra Maharjan was born on 16 November 1954 in Subahal, Lalitpur-8 to Chandra Man Maharjan and Buddhi Maya Maharjan. He has two sons and three daughters. He holds a bachelor's degree in Political Science. He is the vice-president of Jyapu Samaj-Yala, general secretary of Ganeshman Singh Study Foundation and founder member of Rotary Club. He is an active member of society helping those in need.

== Political career ==
Chandra Maharjan began his political career from CPN (Fourth Convention) in 1972. He was a representative of Nepali Congress General Convention. He was initially inclined to communist philosophy but joined NC after the referendum of 1980. He also served as the central member of NC's association of ethnic communities. Maharjan has also worked as district president and was also elected as deputy mayor of Lalitpur Sub-metropolitan City in 1992. In the 2008 Nepalese Constituent Assembly election, however, his victory march was momentarily interrupted, as he was narrowly defeated in Lalitpur-2—losing by a small margin.
