= Kirtipur =

Kirtipur कीर्तिपुर
- Municipality (नगरपालिका)
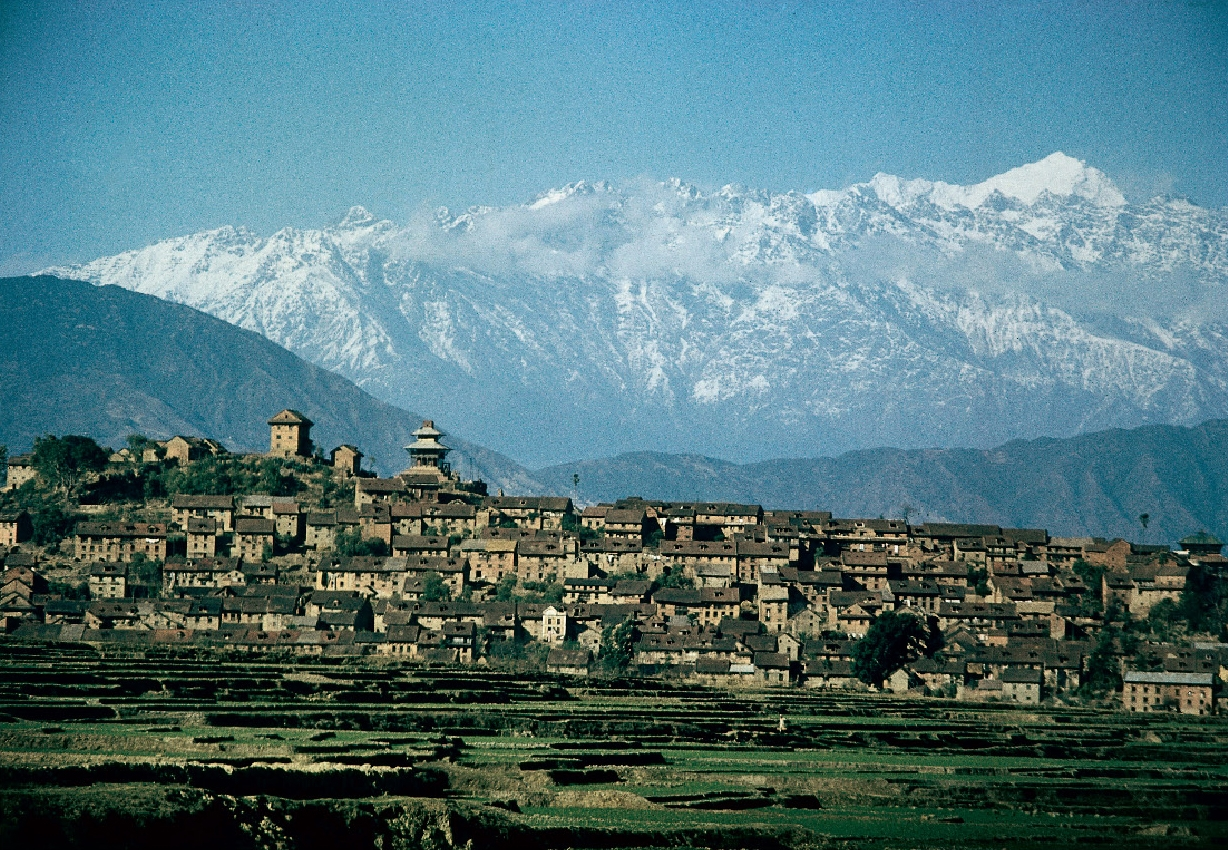
- Kirtipur with the Himalayas in the background
- Motto: झीगु किपू समृद्ध किपू
- Location in Nepal Kirtipur (Nepal)
- Coordinates: 27°40′41″N 85°16′37″E
- Country: Nepal
- Province: Bagmati
- District: Kathmandu

Government
  - Mayor: Mr. Krishna Man Dangol
  - Deputy Mayor: Subha Laxmi Shakya

Population (2021)
  - Total: 81,578
- Time zone: UTC+5:45 (NST)
- Postal code: 44618
- Area code: 01
- Website: www.kirtipurmun.gov.np

Kirtipur (Nepali: कीर्तिपुर; Nepal Bhasa: किपू Kipoo) is a Municipality and an ancient city of Nepal. The Newars are the natives of Kipoo (Kirtipur). It is located in the Kathmandu Valley 5 km south-west of the city of Kathmandu. It is one of the five dense municipalities in the valley, the others being Kathmandu, Lalitpur, Bhaktapur and Madhyapur Thimi. It is one of the most famous and religious places to visit. Many people visit this place not only for its natural environment but also to visit its temples. The city was listed as a UNESCO tentative site in 2008.

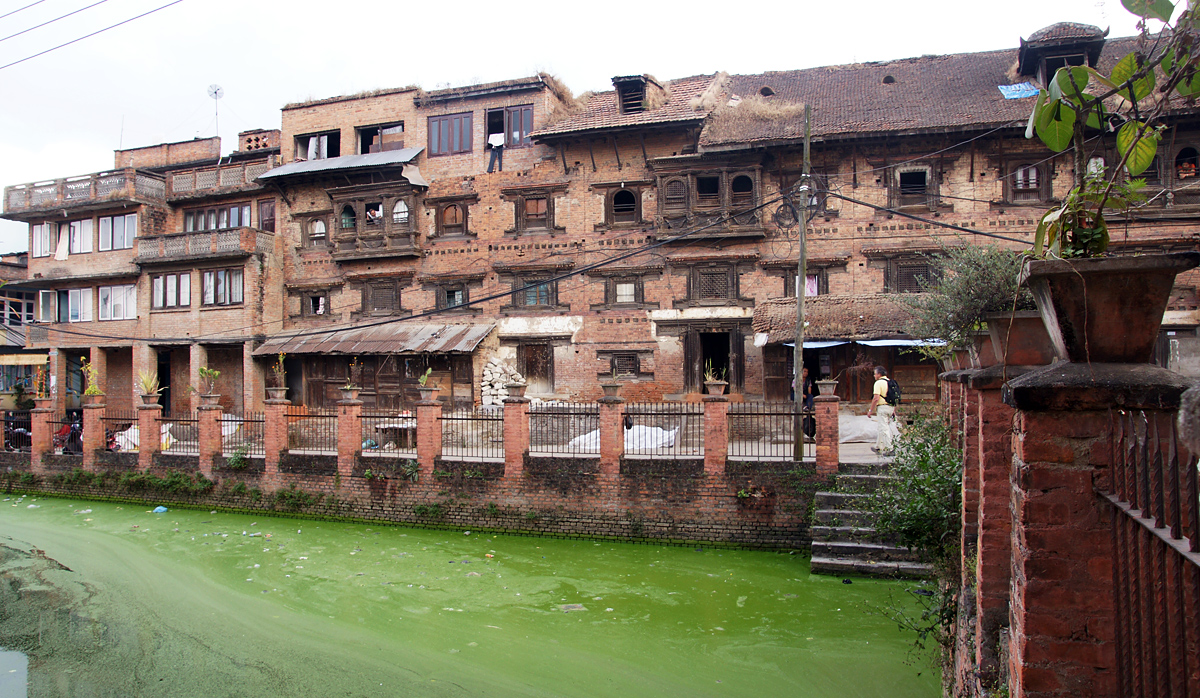
The 18th-century former palace building in the central part of Kirtipur with newer building constructions to the left

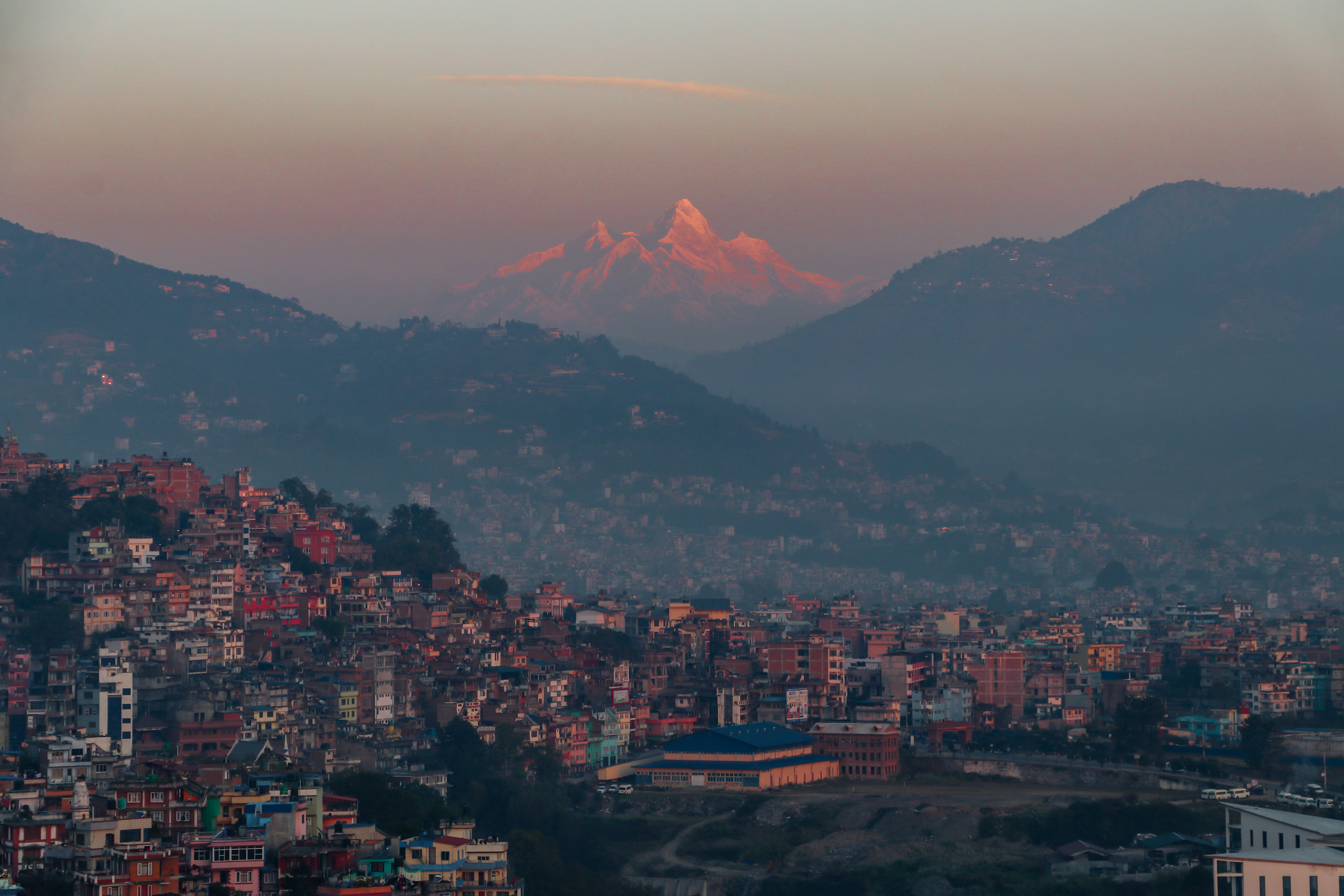
View of Kirtipur and hills and mountains from Jalpa Devi Temple, Chobhar, Kathmandu

== Etymology ==
The name Kirtipur comes from the Sanskrit terms Kirti (glory) and pur (city) as well as Kirat Kingdom of Yalamber's dynasty. The colloquial term used for the city is Kipoo .

== Demographics ==
At the time of the 2011 Nepal census, Kirtipur Municipality had a population of 67,171. Of these, 53.2% spoke Nepali, 35.2% Newar, 3.8% Tamang, 2.2% Maithili, 1.0% Magar, 0.8% Doteli, 0.7% Tharu, 0.5% Bhojpuri, 0.5% Rai, 0.4% Gurung, 0.3% Limbu, 0.2% English, 0.1% Awadhi, 0.1% Bajjika, 0.1% Bantawa, 0.1% Chamling, 0.1% Hindi, 0.1% Sherpa, 0.1% Urdu and 0.3% other languages as their first language.

In terms of ethnicity/caste, 37.3% were Newar, 24.2% Hill Brahmin, 20.4% Chhetri, 5.2% Tamang, 3.0% Magar, 1.3% Rai, 1.0% Tharu, 0.9% Thakuri, 0.8% Gurung, 0.7% Yadav, 0.6% Kami, 0.5% Limbu, 0.4% other Dalit, 0.4% Damai/Dholi, 0.4% Sarki, 0.3% Musalman, 0.3% other Terai, 0.2% Gharti/Bhujel, 0.2% Koiri/Kushwaha, 0.2% Majhi, 0.2% Sanyasi/Dasnami, 0.2% Teli, 0.1% Terai Brahmin, 0.1% Chepang/Praja, 0.1% Dhanuk, 0.1% Gaine, 0.1% Hajjam/Thakur, 0.1% Halwai, 0.1% Kalwar, 0.1% Kathabaniyan, 0.1% Kayastha, 0.1% Kumal, 0.1% Kurmi, 0.1% Sherpa, 0.1% Sudhi, 0.1% Thakali and 0.3% others.

In terms of religion, 74.5% were Hindu, 22.2% Buddhist, 2.1% Christian, 0.8% Kirati, 0.3% Muslim, 0.1% Prakriti and 0.1% others.

In terms of literacy, 86.8% could read and write, 1.2% could only read and 11.9% could neither read nor write.

The population of the municipality grew to 81,578 at the 2021 Nepal census. Around 99.6% of the residents were Nepali citizens and 88.8% were literate in 2021.

Originally a Newar foundation, Kirtipur is still a center of Newar culture. It has been merged with surrounding villages to form the municipality of Kirtipur with a population of 67,171. southern Part of Kirtipur is surrounded by ChampaDevi Hill. On Nepali new Year (Bishak 1) people around kathmandu Valley hike up to the Hill.

It has many temples, gumbas (Buddhist monasteries) and churches.

Due to the presence of Tribhuvan University, Kirtipur is a popular area for out-of-town students and professors to rent houses and they are major contributors to the local economy.

== History ==
Kirtipur's history dates from 1099. It was part of the territory of Lalitpur at the time of the invasion of the Kathmandu Valley by the Gorkhali king Prithvi Narayan Shah in the 18th century.

In 1767, Kirtipur was annexed to the Gorkhali kingdom by Prithvi Narayan Shah following the Battle of Kirtipur. He conquered the town on his third attempt, after entering it by trickery. After this, he cut off the noses of the people (both male and female) over 13 years of age in the city.

This was the site of an inspirational peaceful demonstration of the people in the 2006 mass uprising that overthrew the powers of the king. It is considered to be an anti-monarchy city due to its bitter history against the Shah dynasty whose modern founder conquered the city insultingly, which was followed by negligence of the administration and development by subsequent rulers.

== Places of interest ==
=== Bagh Bhairab ===
Bagh Bhairab Temple is one of the most popular temples dedicated to the angry incarnation of lord Shiva in the form of an angry tiger. This god is regarded as the guardian of Kirtipur and the locals call it Ajudeu, a grandfather god. Bhairab, the most terrifying and awful form of Shiva, is the destroyer on one hand and the guardian on the other. Ceremonial rituals in relation to the important events of life such as rice-feeding, puberty, marriage and even the construction of houses cannot be done without propitiating this deity in most of the towns and cities of Nepal.

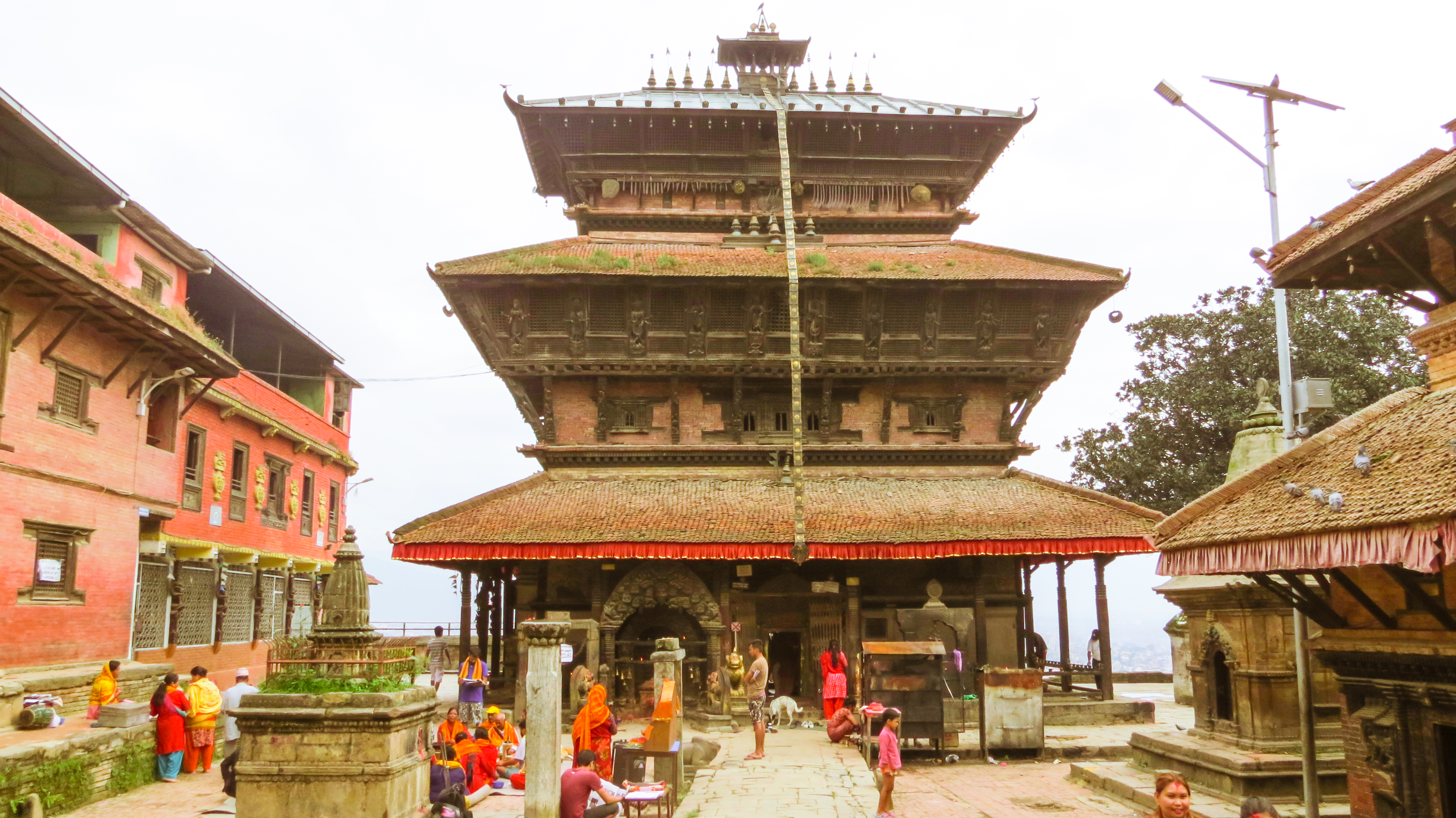
Bagh Bhairab Temple

Bagh Bhairab is mainly worshiped by the Munsi Newars (Man Singh Pradhan). Each of the male family members, on a yearly basis, are supposed to take the chest of Bagh Bhairab turn by turn and keep it in a secret room and worship it twice a day. It is believed that any wrong method applying for worship might curse the individual. Denial for taking the chest home accounts for a fine equivalent to US$2000.

The present three storeyed temple of Bagh Bhairab, probably built in the 16th century, stands in the brick-paved rectangular courtyard with rest houses around it. Some small shrines and stone idols are spread over the courtyard. The main gate is at the southern side of the courtyard. There are two other gates on the eastern and western sides. The two roofs of the temple are made of tiles while the third is covered with gilt copper. Wooden posts with the carving of Hindu gods, and goddesses adorn the temple in addition to supporting its roof. They have been installed in between windows of the second storey, and the names of the carved deities have been finely cut out below them on the pedestals.

There are eighteen pinnacles: one on the first roof, six on the middle and eleven on the top. Beneath the eaves of the first roof there are very old but faded murals depicting the stories of Ramayan. Maha Bharat and the various manifestations of Durga, the mighty goddess. These paintings are frescoes in red with white plaster background. At the right side of the main gate of the temple there is Hifa Dyo, the god of blood sacrifice is allowed directly to Bagh Bhairab, all animal offerings here are made to this deity just like the animal sacrifices are made to Kumari, a stone idol, placed at the second gate in the left side of Chandeswori in Banepa and to the Chhetrapal which is at the very beginning of the final series of the steps to the temple of Khadga Jogini in Sankhu.

There are two torans over Hifa Dyo. They bear very fine cuttings of Asta-Matriks, Asta-Bhairabs and other gods and goddesses. In the western wall of the temple there is a hollow space regarded by the local people as Nasa Dyo, the god of music, and dance. Bagh Bhairab made of clay has been enshrined in the left side corner in the temple. The three glass-eyed tiger-god is tongue-less and tooth-less but covered with silver and copper plates and heavily ornamented. This deity as mentioned in the stone inscriptions has been called Bagheswor (the tiger god), Bhimsen Bhattarak(Bhimsen, the governing deity), Gudei Sthanadhipati (the lord in the form of tiger) and Ajudyo(the ancestral god).

The local people regard this deity as the embodiment of prudence, knowledge, productivity and strength to resist all evils. Hence, the auspicious ceremonies such as weddings, Bratabandha (rite of passage for adolescent boys), Pasni (rice-feeding) and other ritual performances in Kirtipur are done only after a ceremonial worship to this deity.

=== Chilancho Stupa ===
A Buddhist shrine is situated on the southern hill. Chilancho Vihar (monastery) is situated on the eastern side of Kirtipur, Nepal. It was made in the medieval period. An inscription of Nepal Samvat 635 (Licchavi Period) is found in this Chaitya. Therefore, it is one of the most important historical stupas of this region. In Nepal Bhasa, the word Chilan means immortal and the word Cho means Hill. Therefore, its literal meaning is the immortal god situated on the hill. The stupa is about 9.0-10.5 high on a quadrangular base. On all four sides, there are small chaityas. The dome is plastered white.

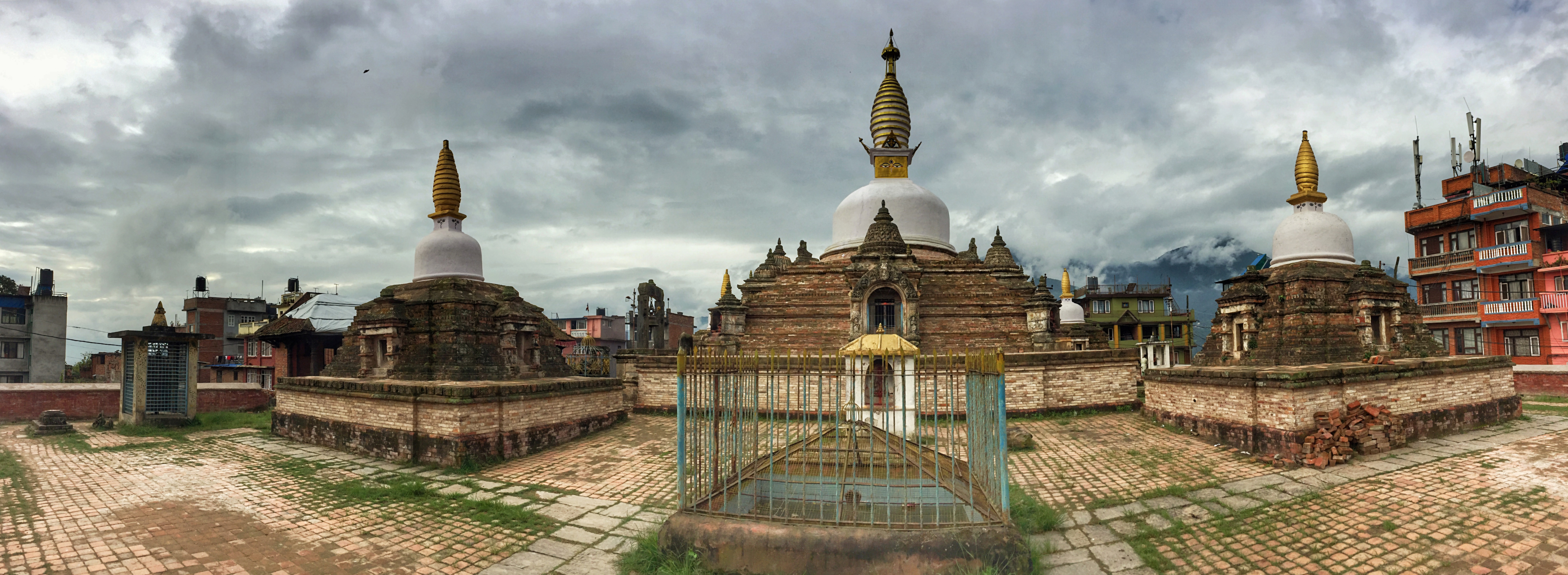
Panorama of Chilancho Stupa

=== Uma Maheshwor ===
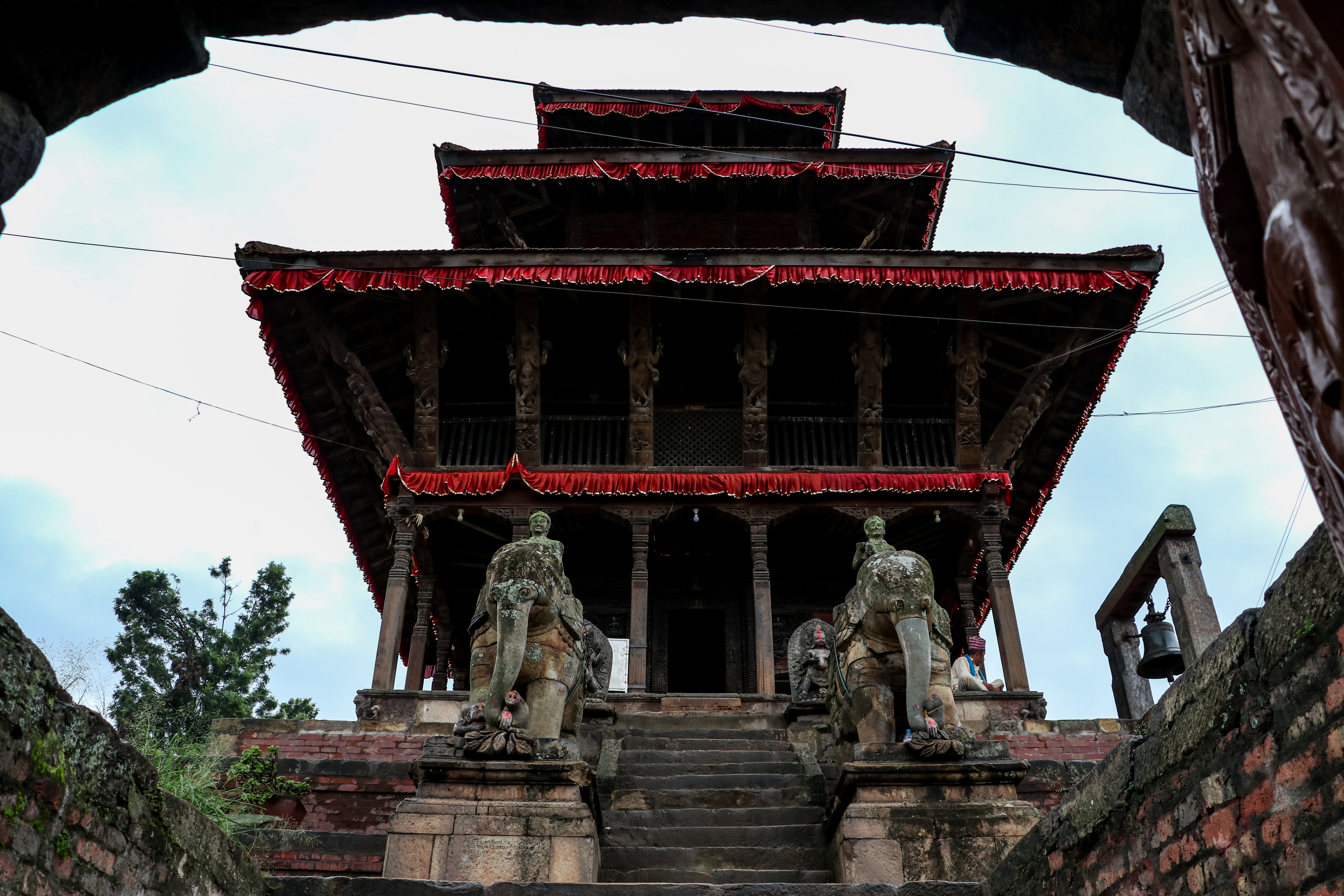
Uma Maheshwor Temple

Uma Maheshwor temple (locally, Kwacho Dega) is one of the important heritage sites of Kirtipur. This pagoda-style three-storied temple is situated at the highest point (1414 m) of Kirtipur. Since this temple is at the top of the hill, one can enjoy picturesque view of the Kathmandu valley and mountains like Langtang, Dorge Lakkpa, Chobhu Bhamure, and Gaurishankar.

The temple was constructed in 1655 by Rautra Vishwanath Babu, a son of king Sidhhi Narsinga Malla. It was destroyed in an earthquake in 1832. After remaining dilapidated for about a century, it was restored in 1933. after it was again destroyed by an earthquake. Local people and government made a herculean effort to renovate it into the current state. The restoration process was completed only in 1982. In 2008 some work was done to preserve the arts of the temple.

There is an artistic stone gate at the entrance. On each side of the stone staircase leading to the temple is a stone elephant, with sculptures of Bhimsen and Kuber as protectors of the temple. The main deities in this temple are standing Lord Shiva and Parvati. There are other images of deities like Sarasvati and Mahismardini on false doors around temple.

The wooden doors, pillars, and beams are crafted with artistic figures of different gods and goddess such as Astamatrika and Asta Bhairav. Similarly, erotic figures are also carved in wooden beams. According to archeologists, these figures on beams have tantric values.

The bell on the northern side of temple was cast in 1895 by Gillett & Johnston Founders, Corydon. It was one of the four quarter bells of Ghantaghar of the central Kathmandu and was reallocated to this temple after the Ghantaghar was destroyed by the earthquake in 1933.

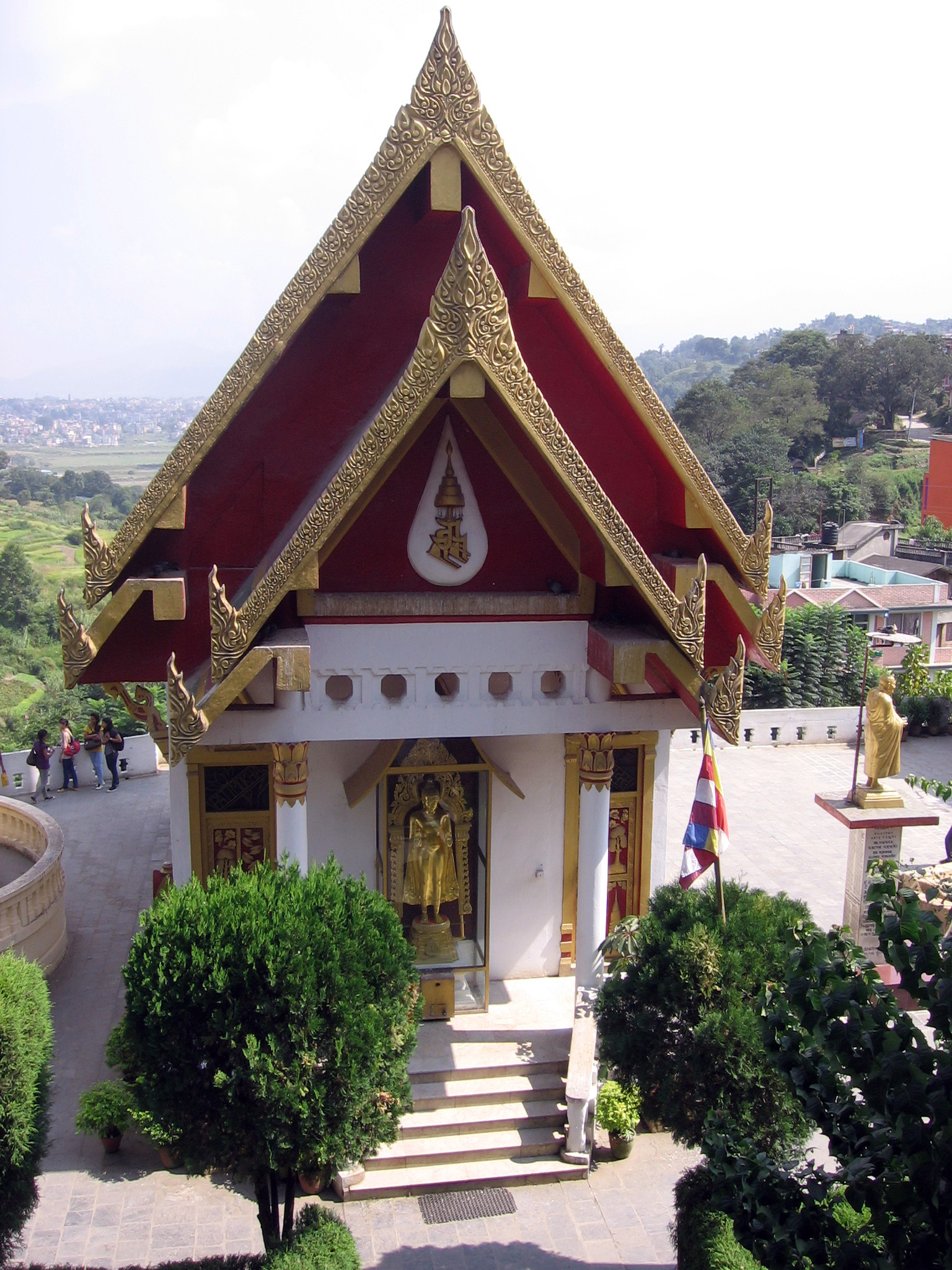
Shri Kirti Vihar, Kirtipur

=== Nagar Mandap Shri Kirti Bihar ===
A Theravada Buddhist monastery built in traditional Thai architectural style, is situated near the entrance to the city.

=== Tau Daha ===
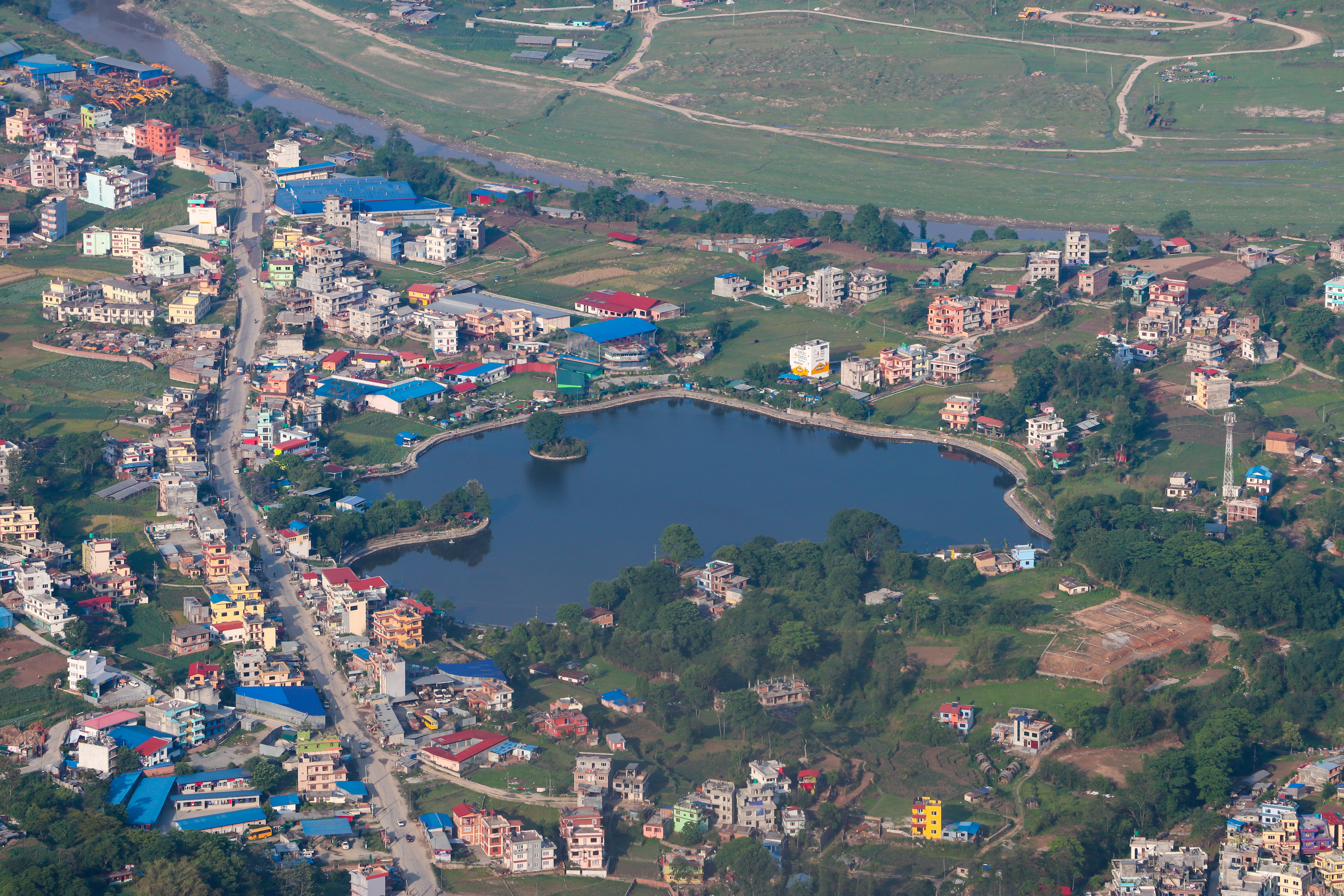
Tau Daha

== Education ==
The largest (according to number of students and colleges), the oldest and most distinguished university in Nepal, the Tribhuvan University, is located in Kirtipur.

== Media ==
To promote local culture Kirtipur has one FM radio station, Radio Newa F.M. - 106.6 MHz, a community radio station. There are several weekly newspapers published from Kirtipur. They are Shahid weekly, Kirtipur Darpan, Kirtipur Sandesh, and Jwajalapa weekly. There is a local television station, Kirtipur Channel, and some more local channels. To Promote local culture, heritages, events Kirtipur Area has popular Facebook page named Panga, Kirtipur where people can get all the updates of events happened before and happening .

== Sports ==
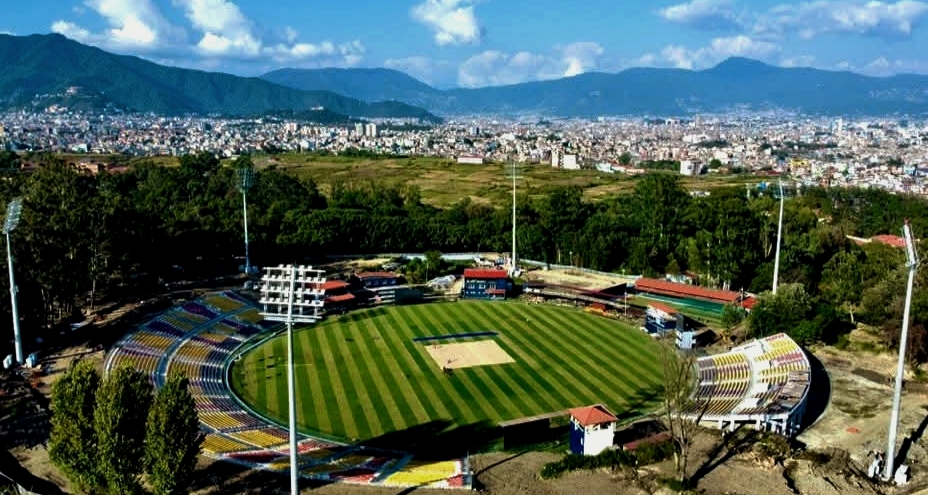
Tribhuvan University International Cricket Stadium

== Notable people ==
- Nanita Maharjan - bodybuilder
- Kali Prasad Baskota - Singer
