= Parbat Gurung =

Nepali politician (born 1968)

Honourable Parbat Gurung
- पार्वत गुरुङ
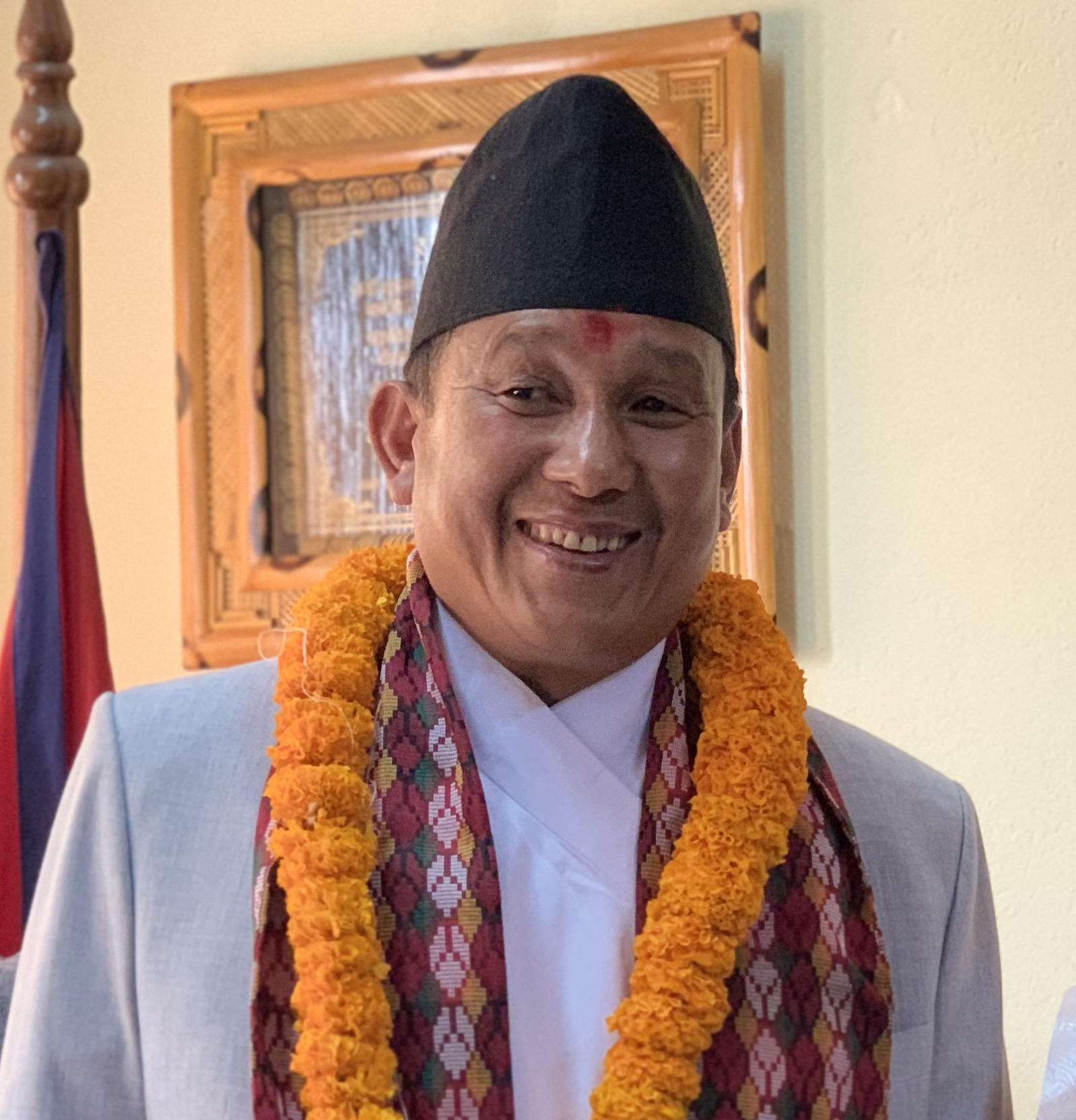

Minister of Communication and Information Technology
- In office Oct 15 2020 – 4 June 2021
- President: Bidhya Devi Bhandari
- Prime Minister: K.P. Oli
- Preceded by: Yuba Raj Khatiwada
- Succeeded by: Nainkala Thapa

Minister of Women, Children and Senior Citizens
- In office November 20, 2019 – 25 December 2020
- President: Bidhya Devi Bhandari
- Prime Minister: KP Sharma Oli
- Preceded by: Tham Maya Thapa
- Succeeded by: Lila Nath Shrestha

Member of Parliament, Pratinidhi Sabha
- In office 4 March 2018 – 18 September 2022
- Constituency: Dolakha 1

Member of Constituent Assembly
- In office 21 January 2014 – 14 October 2017
- Preceded by: Devi Khadka
- Constituency: Dolakha 1

Personal details
- Born: 20 July 1968 (age 58) Gaurishankar, Dolakha, Nepal
- Party: CPN (UML)
- Spouse: Saraswoti Rai
- Website: www.parbatgurung.com

Parbat Gurung (Nepali: पार्वत गुरुङ) is a Nepali politician and former Minister of Communication and Information Technology. Gurung’s portfolio got changed to the communication ministry from the Women, Children and Senior Citizens Ministry during a cabinet reshuffle on October 14, 2020. He was elected to the House of Representatives from Dolakha constituency in the 2017 general elections. He was also elected in the 2013 Nepali Constituent Assembly election from Dolakha district.
