= List of tunnels in Nepal =

This list of tunnels in Nepal includes any road and waterway tunnels.

== List ==
Tunnel	Diameter (m)	Start location	End location	Length (m)	Type	Construction year	Reference
Melamchi Water Supply Project (Longest in Nepal)	3.70	Melamchi	Sundarijal	25,915	Drinking water supply	2021	
Bheri Babai Diversion Multipurpose Project				12,000	Irrigation	2019	
Churia Tunnel (oldest tunnel in Nepal)		Hetauda	Amlekhganj	500	Transport	1917	
Upper Tamakoshi Hydroelectric Project		Dolakha District		8400	Hydropower	2017	
Kulekhani III				4221	Hydropower	2013	
Tinau Hydropower Plant		Butwal		2462	Hydropower	1978	
Mai Hydropower Station	3.80	Ilam		2198	Hydropower	2015	
Nagdhunga tunnel	7.0	Kathmandu	Dhading	2688	Transport	2026	
Chameliya Khola Hydropower Station	5.2	Darchula district		4067	Hydropower		
Khimti I Hydropower Plant	4.0	Dolakha District		7900	Hydropower	1996	
Hewa Khola-A Hydroelectric Project	3.20	Panchthar district		3929	Hydropower	2012	
Upper Madi Hydropower Station	3.20	Kaski district		3920	Hydropower	2016	

== See also ==
- List of tunnels by location
