= List of power stations in Nepal =

This article includes a list of power stations in Nepal.

== Background ==
As of 4 March 2025, Nepal's total installed electricity capacity was 3421.956 megawatts (MW). This includes 3255.806 MW from hydropower, 106.74 MW from solar, 53.41 MW from thermal, and 6 MW from co-generation.

on 26 August 2026, a sudden huge flooding event in the Trishuli River valley caused damage to electricity generation, transmission, and distribution infrastructure, disrupting supplies in affected areas. The Nepal Electricity Authority (NEA) said that 13 hydropower projects had been damaged, leaving hundreds of billions of rupees in damage. These included Rasuwagadi Hydropower Project, Chilime, Upper Trishuli 3A Hydropower Station, the Upper Trishuli 3B Hub 220 kV substation, Trishuli Hydropower Station, and Devighat Hydropower Station.

== Hydroelectric stations ==
Location of power stations in Nepal
Hydro

As of 9 March 2026

S/N	Name of station	Province	Location	Capacity (MW)	Commissioned	Owner	Refs
1	Upper Tamakoshi Project	Bagmati	Dolakha District	456.000	2021	NEA	
2	Kaligandaki A Hydroelectric Power Station	Gandaki	Syangja	144.000	2002	NEA	
3	Rasuwagadi Hydropower Project	Bagmati	Rasuwa District	111.000	2024	Chilime Hydropower Company Limited (CHPCL) and NEA	
4	Solukhola Dudhkoshi Hydropower Project	Koshi	Solukhumbu	86.000	2023 AD	Sahas Urja Ltd	
5	Likhu -1	Bagmati	Gumdel (Ramechhap District)	77.000	2024	Pan Himay Energy Ltd	
6	Middle Tamor	Koshi	Hangdeva, Khokling, Phurumbu, Sawadin (Taplejung)	73.000	2024	Sanima Middle Tamor Hydropower Ltd	
7	Nilgiri Khola-II Cascade Project	Gandaki	Narchyang (Myagdi)	71.000	2024	Nilgirikhola Hydropower Company Limited	
8	Middle Marsyangdi Hydropower Station	Gandaki	Lamjung District	70.000	2008	NEA	
9	Marsyangdi Hydropower Station	Gandaki	Tanahun	69.000	1989	NEA	
10	Kulekhani I	Bagmati	Makwanpur	60.000	1982	NEA	
11	Khimti I Hydropower Plant	Bagmati	Dolkha	60.000	2000	Himal Power Ltd.	
12	Upper Trishuli 3A Hydropower Station	Bagmati	Rasuwa District	60.000	2019	NEA	
13	Likhu -2	Koshi	Gumdel (Ramechhap) Chaulakharka (Waula) (Solukhumbu)	55.000	2023	Global Hydropower Associate Ltd	
14	Super Dordi Kha Hydropower Project	Bagmati	Dhodeni, Faleni (Lamjung)	54.000	2023	Peoples Hydropower Company Pvt. Ltd.	
15	Likhu-4	Bagmati	Ragani, Pokli (Okhaldhunga) Saibu, Bijulikot, Naga Daha, Tilpung (Ramechhap)	52.400	2021	Green Ventures Ltd	
16	Likhu Khola 'A'	Koshi	Chaulakharka(Waula), Goli (Solukhumbu)	51.000	2022	Numbur Himalaya Hydropower Ltd	
17	Upper Marsyangdi A Hydroelectric Station	Gandaki	Lamjung Marsyangdi Rural Municipality	50.000	2016	SSPC, Power China	
18	Bhote Koshi Power Plant (Upper Bhote Koshi)	Bagmati	Sindhupalchowk	45.000	2001	Bhote Koshi Power Company Private Limited (BKPC)	
19	Super Madi	Gandaki	Namarjung, Parche, Saimrang, Kalika (Kaski)	44.000	2023	Himal Hydro and General Construction Ltd.	
20	Sanjen	Bagmati	Chilime (Rasuwa)	42.500	2024	Sanjen Jalvidyut Co.	
21	Mristi Khola	Gandaki	Dana, Narchyang (Myagdi)	42.000	2021	Mountain Energy Nepal Limited	
22	Upper Chameliya HP	Sudurpashchim	Tapoban, Latinath, Guljar, Sitaula (Darchula)	40.000	2023	Api Power Co. Ltd	
23	Upper Kalangad	Karnali	Dahabagar, Khiratadi (Bajhang)	38.460	2023	Sani Gad Hydro pvt. Ltd	
24	Nilgiri Khola	Gandaki	Narchyang (Myagdi)	38.000	2024	Nilgiri Khola Hydropower Company Pvt. Ltd.	
25	Upper Balephi A	Bagmati	Golche, Pangtang, Dhumthang (Sindhupalchok)	36.000	2022	Balephi Hydropower Ltd.	
26	Kulekhani II	Bagmati	Makwanpur	32.000	1986	NEA	
27	Chameliya Khola Hydropower Station	Sudurpashchim	Darchula	30.000	2018	NEA	
28	Nyadi Khola	Gandaki	Bahundada, Bhulbhule (Lamjung)	30.000	2022	Nyadi Hydropower Limited	
29	Lower Likhu	Bagmati	Tarkerabari, Yasam, Gamanamatar (Okhaldhunga); Bijulikot, Gothgau (Ramechhap)	28.100	2022	Swaita Ganga Hydropower and Construction Pvt. Ltd.	
30	Dordi Khola	Gandaki	Archalbot, Chiti, Dhodeni, Nauthar, Shree Banjyang, Udipur (Lamjung)	27.000	2022	Himalaya Power Partner Pvt. Ltd	
31	Upper Madi Hydropower Station	Gandaki	Kaski District	25.000	2017	Madi Power Pvt Ltd.	
32	Kabeli B1 Hydropower Station	Koshi	Panchthar District	25.000	2019	Arun Kabeli Power Limited	
33	Upper Dordi A HEP	Gandaki	Dhodeni, Faleni (Lamjung)	25.000	2022	Liberty Energy Hydropower Pvt. Ltd.	
34	Singati Khola Hydropower Project	Bagmati	Babare, Laduk, Lamidada (Dolakha)	25.000	2021	Singati Hydro Energy Pvt. Ltd.	
35	Seti Khola HPP	Gandaki	Ghachok, Machhapuchchhre, Purachaur, Sardikhola (Kaski)	25.000	2024	Vision Lumbini Urja Company Limited	
36	Trishuli Hydropower Station	Bagmati	Nuwakot	24.000	1967	NEA (Initially installed capacity was 21 MW, rehabilitated in 1995)	
37	Solu Hydropower Station	Koshi	Solukhumbu District	23.500	2020	Upper Solu Hydroelectric Company Pvt Ltd	
38	Upper Chaku A	Bagmati	Marbin, Fulpingkatti (Sindhupalchok)	22.200	2021	Shiva Sri Hydropower Pvt. Ltd	
39	Lower Hewa Khola Hydropower Project	Koshi	Panchthar District	22.100	2013	Mountain Hydro Nepal Limited	
40	Mai Hydropower Station	Koshi	Illam	22.000	2014	Sanima Hydropower	
41	Chilime Hydropower Plant	Bagmati	Rasuwa	22.000	2003	Chilime Hydropower Company Ltd.	
42	Bagmati Nadi Hydropower Station	Bagmati	Makawanpur District	22.000	2019	Mandu Hydropower Pvt. Ltd.	
43	Lower Hewa Hydropower Station	Koshi	Panchthar District	21.600	2019	Mountain Hydro Nepal (P.) Ltd	
44	Lower Modi Khola	Gandaki	Durlung, Deurali, Ramja, Tilahar (Parbat)	20.000	2021	Modi Energy Pvt. Ltd	
45	Upper Solu Khola HPP	Koshi	Beni, Salleri (Solukhumbu)	19.800	2023	Beni Hydropower Project	
46	Middle Modi	Gandaki	Deupurkot, Tilahar (Parbat)	18.000	2022	Middle Modi Hydropower Limited	
47	Kalanga	Karnali	Sunkuda, Khiratadi, Banjh (Bajhang)	15.330	2023	Kalanga Hydropower P Ltd	
48	Gandak Hydropower Station	Lumbini	Nawalparasi	15.000	1979	NEA	
49	Hewa Khola A Hydropower Station	Koshi	Panchthar District	14.900	2017	Panchthar Power Company Pvt. Ltd.	
50	Maya Khola Hydropower Project	Bagmati	Mamling, Madi Rambeni, Baneswor (Sankhuwasabha)	14.900	2023	Maya Khola Hydropower Company Ltd	
51	Modi Khola Hydroelectric Power Plant	Gandaki	Parbat	14.800	2000	NEA	
52	Upper Sanjen	Bagmati	Chilime (Rasuwa)	14.800	2023	Sanjen Jalvidhyut Co	
53	Upper Mailun Khola	Bagmati	Gatlang, Haku, Dandagoun (Rasuwa)	14.300	2024	Upper Mailung Khola Hydropower Limited	
54	Devighat Hydropower Station	Bagmati	Nuwakot	14.100	1984	NEA	
55	Ghar Khola	Gandaki	Shikha (Myagdi)	14.000	2023	Myagdi Hydropower Ltd.	
56	Kulekhani III	Bagmati	Makawanpur	14.000	2019	NEA	
	Super Kabeli Khola A HEP	Koshi	Taplejung	13.500	2024	Snow River Ltd	
57	Madkyu Khola Hydropower Station	Gandaki	Kaski	13.000	2018	Silkes Hydropower Pvt. Ltd. Jungey Hydropower Pvt. Ltd.	
58	Madkyu Khola Hydropower Station	Gandaki	Kaski District	13.000	2018	Silkes Hydropower Pvt. Ltd	
59	Dordi-1	Gandaki	Chiti, Bansar, Dhodeni, Faleni (Lamjung)	12.00	2022	Dordi Khola Jalvidyut Company Limited	
60	Dudhkunda Khola HEP	Koshi	Beni, Takasindu (Solukhumbu)	12.00	2024	Mount Everest Power Development P. Ltd.	
61	Jhimruk Khola Hydropower Station	Lumbini	Pyuthan	12.500	1994	Butwal Power Company Ltd.	
62	Namarjun Madi	Gandaki	Namarjung, Sildujure (Kaski)	12.000	2020	Himalayan Hydropower Pvt. Ltd	
63	Upper Khimti	Bagmati	Chuchure (Ramechhap)	12.000	2022	Himalaya Urja Bikas Co. Pvt. Ltd.	
64	Upper Mai Hydropower Station	Koshi	Illam District	12.000	2016	Mai Valley Hydropower P Ltd.	
65	Thapa Khola Hydropower Station	Gandaki	Mustang	11.200	2018	Mount Kailash Energy Co. Pvt. Ltd.	
66	Sunigad HEP	Sudurpashchim	Bajhang, Sunikot	11.050	2022	Omega EnergyDeveloper Pvt. Ltd	
67	Lower Khare	Bagmati	Bulung, Chankhu, Khare, Suriti (Dolakha)	11.000	2021	Universal Power Company P. Ltd	
68	Sanigad	Karnali	Kaphalaseri, Pipalkot (Bajhang)	10.700	2023	Bungal Hydro Ltd	
69	Down Piluwa	Koshi	Baneswor, Ankhibhui, Mamling (Sankhuwasabha)	10.300	2023	River Falls Hydropower Development P. Ltd.	
70	Sunkoshi Hydropower Station	Bagmati	Sindhupalchowk	10.050	1972	NEA	
71	Lower Modi I	Lumbini	Parbat	10.000	2012	United Modi Hydropower Pvt. Ltd.	
72	Makari Gad	Sudurpashchim	Guljar, Khandeswori (Darchula)	10.000	2023	Makarigad Hydropower Pvt. Ltd	
73	Sipring Khola Hydropower Station	Bagmati	Dolakha District	10.000	2013	Synergy Power Development P Ltd	
74	Kabeli B1 Cascade HPP	Koshi	Ambarpur, Nagi (Panchthar)	9.940	2022	Arun Valley Hydropower Development Company Ltd.	
75	Iwa Khola Hydropower Project	Koshi	Taplejung district	9.900	2015	Rairang Hydropower Development Company Ltd	
76	Upper Ingwa Khola	Koshi	Taplejung	9.700	2024	Ingwa Hydopower Ltd.	
77	Super Mai-A Hydropower Station	Koshi	Ilam District	9.600	2020	Sagarmatha Jalbidhyut Company P. Ltd.	
78	Mai Beni HPP	Koshi	Namsaling, Soyang, Goduk (Ilam)	9.510	2021	Samling Power company Pvt. Ltd	
79	Mid Solu Khola HEP	Koshi	Solukhumbu, Gora Khami, Salleri	9.500	2022	Mid Solu Hydropower Ltd.	
80	Super Chepe HEP	Gandaki	Gorkha	9.050	2024	Ridge Line Energy Pvt. Ltd	
81	Andhi Khola Hydropower Station	Lumbini	Syangja	9.400	1991	Butwal Power Company Ltd. (Initially installed capacity was 5.1 MW, rehabilitated in 2016)	
82	Rudi A Hydropower Station	Gandaki	Kaski District	8.800	2019	Bindhabasini Hydropower Development Company Pvt. Ltd	
83	Chepe Khola Small HEP	Gandaki	Kharibot (Gorkha), Dudhpokhari (Lamjung)	8.630	2022	Aashutosh Investment Pvt. Ltd.	
84	Nau Gad Khola Hydropower Station	Sudurpashchim	Darchula District	8.500	2015	Api Power Company Pvt. Ltd	
85	Upper Hewa HPP	Koshi	Jaljala, Siddhapokhari (Sankhuwasabha)	8.500	2022	Upper Hewa Khola Hydropower Company Pvt Ltd	
86	Mai Cascade Hydropower Station	Koshi	Ilam District	8.000	2018	Himal Dolkha Hydropower Company Pvt Ltd	
87	Taksar Pikhuwa	Koshi	Kota, Mane Bhanjyang, Taksar, Dalgaun (Bhojpur)	8.000	2021	Taksar Pikhuwa Khola Hydropower Ltd.	
88	Upper Naugad Gad Hydropower Station	Sudurpashchim	Darchula District	8.000	2019	Api Power Company Ltd.	
89	Super Mai Hydropower Station	Koshi	Ilam District	7.800	2018	Supermai Hydropower Pvt. Ltd.	
90	Jogmai Khola Hydropower Station	Koshi	Ilam District	7.600	2017	Sanvi Energy Pvt. Ltd.	
91	Indrawati III Hydropower Station	Bagmati	Sindhupalchowk	7.500	2002	National Hydropower Co. Ltd.	
92	Upper Khorunga Hydropower Station	Koshi	Terhathum District	7.500	2020	Terhathum Power Company Pvt. Ltd.	
93	Upper Midim Khola SHP	Gandaki	Bhujung (Lamjung)	7.500	2024	Bhujung Hydro Power Ltd.	
94	Yambaling Khola	Bagmati	Gumba, Golche (Sindhupalchok)	7.271	2024	Yambaling Hydropower Ltd.	
95	Sapsup Khola Small Hydro Electric Project	Koshi	Batase, Chhorambu, Rajapani (Khotang)	7.151	2022	Three Star Hydro Power Pvt. Ltd.	
96	Ankhu Khola-1 Hydropower Station	Bagmati	Dhading District	7.000	2013	Ankhu Jalvidut Co. Pvt. Ltd	
97	Chepe Khola HEP	Gandaki	Thalajung, Kerabari (Gorkha)	7.000	2024	Champawati Hydro Power P. Ltd	
98	Suri Khola	Bagmati	Chankhu (Dolakha)	7.000	2022	Suri Khola Hydropower Pvt Ltd	
99	Upper Khimti II	Bagmati	Chuchure (Ramechhap)	7.000	2022	Himalaya Urja Bikash Company Limited	
100	Upper Mardi Hydropower Station	Gandaki	Kaski District	7.000	2019	United Idimardi and R.B. Hydropower Pvt Ltd	
101	Upper Suri Khola HPP	Bagmati	Chankhu (Dolakha)	7.000	2023	Makar Jitumaya Hudropower Pvt. Ltd.	
102	Molun Khola Small Hydropower Station	Koshi	Okhaldhunga District	7.000	2018	Molun Hydropower Co. Pvt. Ltd	
103	Rudi Khola-B Hydropower Station	Gandaki	Kaski District	6.600	2020	Bindhyabasini Hydropower Development Co. Pvt Ltd	
104	Lower Jogmai Khola HPP	Koshi	Namsaling, Goduk, Panchakanya (Ilam)	6.20	2021	Asian Hydropower Pvt. Ltd	
105	Puwa Khola Hydropower Station	Koshi	Ilam	6.20	1999	NEA	
106	Daraudi A Hydropower Plant	Gandaki	Gorkha District	6.00	2016	Daraundi Kalika Hydro	
107	Upper Mai-C Hydropower Station	Koshi	Ilam District	6.10	2017	Mai Valley Hydropower P.L.,	
108	Upper Phawa HPP	Koshi	Sikaicha, Tiringe (Taplejung)	5.80	2024	Unitech Hydropower Company Ltd.	
109	Ghalemdi Khola Hydropower Station	Gandaki	Myagdi District	5.00	2020	Ghalemdi Hydro Limited	
110	Ghatte Khola	Bagmati	Marbu (Dolakha)	5.00	2021	Mankamana Engineering HP	
111	Mailung Khola Hydropower Station	Bagmati	Rasuwa	5.00	2013	Mailun Khola Hydropower Pvt. Ltd.	
112	Richet Khola SHP	Gandaki	Manbu, Kashigaun (Gorkha)	5.00	2021	Richet Jalbidhyut Company Pvt. Ltd.	
113	Rukum Gad	Karnali	Kanda, Sobha (Rukum)	5.00	2023	Rapti Hydro and General Construction Pvt. Ltd.	
114	Pikhuwa Khola Hydropower Station	Koshi	Bhojpur District	5.00	2019	Eastern Hydropower P Ltd	
115	Phawa khola Hydropower Station	Koshi	Taplejung District	5.00	2016	Shiwani Hydropower Company	
116	Siuri Khola Hydropower Station	Gandaki	Lamjung District	5.00	2012	Nyadi Group Pvt Ltd	
117	Tadi Khola Hydropower Station	Bagmati	Nuwakot District	5.00	2002	Aadi Shakti Bidhut Bikash Co. P. Ltd	
118	Upper Hugdi Hydropower Station	Lumbini	Gulmi District	5.00	2015	Ruru Jalbidyut Pariyojana Pvt. Ltd	
119	Lower Tadi	Bagmati	Balkumari, Samundratar, Sundaradevi, Thaprek (Nuwakot)	4.993	2022	Buddha Bhumi Nepal Hydropower Co. Pvt. ltd.	
120	Puwa II Hydropower Project	Koshi	Sakhejung, Maipokhari, Barbote (Ilam)	4.96	2022	Peoples' Power Ltd	
121	Mardi Khola Hydropower Station	Gandaki	Kaski District	4.80	2010	Gandaki Hydropower Development Co. P. Ltd	
123	Padam Khola Small Hydropower Station	Karnali	Dailekh District	4.80	2019	Dolti Power Company P. Ltd	
124	Upper Piluwa Khola-2 SHP	Koshi	Mawadin, Siddhakali (Sankhuwasabha)	4.72	2023	Menchhiyam Hydropower P Ltd. Itahari, Sunsari	
125	Upper Chirkhuwa Khola	Koshi	Nepaledada, Mulpani, Khartimchcha (Bhojpur)	4.70	2024	Chirkhuwa Hydropower Company Pvt td	
126	Upper Machha Khola HEP	Ganaki	Gumda, Laprak (Gorkha)	4.55	2023	Bikash Hydropower Company Pvt. Ltd.	
127	Bijayapur-1 Hydropower Station	Gandaki	Kaski District	4.50	2012	Bhagawati Hydropower Development Company	
128	Hewa Khola	Koshi	Jaljala, Siddhapokhari (Sankhuwasabha)	4.455	2010	Barun Hydropower Development Co. Pvt. Ltd	
129	Radhi Small Hydropower Station	Gandaki	Lamjung District	4.40	2014	Radhi Bidyut Co. Ltd	
130	Tungun - Thosne Khola Hydropower Station	Bagmati	Lalitpur District	4.36	2016	Khani Khola Hydropower Company Ltd	
131	Baramchi Khola Hydropower Station	Bagmati	Sindhupalchok District	4.20	2015	Unique Hydel Pvt Ltd	
132	Khudi Khola Hydropower Station	Gandaki	Lamjung District	4.00	2006	Khudi Hydropower Limited	
133	Puwa Khola-1 Hydropower Station	Koshi	Ilam District	4.00	2017	Puwa Khola – 1 Hydropower Pvt. Ltd	
134	Sardi Khola Hydropower Station	Gandaki	Kaski District	4.00	2017	Mandakini Hydropower Pvt. Ltd.	
135	Upper Chhyandi Small HPP	Gandaki	Bansar, Faleni (Lamjung)	4.00	2021	Chhyandi Hysropower Ltd	
136	Super Mai Khola Cascade Hydropower Station	Koshi	Ilam District	3.8	2020	Mai Khola Hydropower Pvt. Ltd.	
137	Dwari Khola Small Hydropower Station	Karnali	Dailekh	3.75	2017	Bhugol Energy Development Company Pvt Ltd	
138	Charnawati Khola Hydroelectric Project	Bagmati	Dolakha	3.52	2013	Nepal Hydro Developer Limited	
139	Seti Khola HPP	Gandaki	Shivalaya (Parbat)	3.50	2024	Parbat Paiyu Khola Hydropower Company	
140	Kapadigad Hydropower Station	Sudurpashchim	Doti District	3.33	2019	Salmanidevi Hydropower Pvt Ltd	
141	Sabha Khola Hydropower Station	Koshi	Sankhuwasabha District	3.30	2017	Dibyaswari Hydropower P Ltd	
142	Chatara Hydropower Station	Koshi	Sunsari	3.20	1996	NEA	
143	Gelun Khola HPP	Bagmati	Baramchi, Hagam, Jalbire (Sindhupalchok)	3.20	2023	Gelun Khola Hydropower Company Pvt Ltd	
144	Bhairab Kund Khola Hydropower Station	Bagmati	Sindhupalchok District	3.00	2014	Bhairabkund Hydropower Pvt. Ltd.	
145	Chaku Khola Hydropower Station	Bagmati	Sindhupalchok District	3.00	2005	Alliance Power Nepal	
146	Midim Khola Hydropower Station	Gandaki	Lamjung District	3.00	2018	Union Hydropower P. Ltd	
147	Piluwa Khola Hydropower Station	Koshi	Sankhuwasabha District	3.00	2003	Arun Valley Hydropower Development Company Pvt. Ltd.	
148	Rawa Khola	Koshi	Sungdel, Diplung (Khotang)	3.00	2020	Rawa Energy Development Pvt Ltd	
149	Upper Puwa-1 Hydropower Station	Koshi	Ilam District	3.00	2o15	Joshi Hydropower Co. P. Ltd	
150	Chake Khola Hydropower Station	Bagmati	Ramechhap District	2.83	2017	Garjang Upatyaka HP Company Limited	
151	Sunkoshi Small Hydropower Plant	Bagmati	Sindhupalchowk	2.60	2005	Sanima Hydropower	
152	Daram Khola-A Hydropower Station	Gandaki	Baglung District	2.50	2016	Sayapatri Hydropower Pvt. Ltd.	
153	Upper Syange Khola SHP	Gandaki	Taghring (Lamjung)	2.40	2022	Upper Syange Hydropower Pvt. Ltd.	
154	Jiri Khola Small Hydropower Station	Bagmati	Dolakha District	2.40	2015	Bojini Company (P.) Ltd	
155	Panauti (Khopasi) Hydropower	Bagmati	Kavre	2.40	1965	NEA	
156	Ridi Khola Hydropower Station	Lumbini	Palpa District	2.40	2009	Ridi Hydropower Development Co P Ltd	
157	Jhyari Khola Hydropower Station	Bagmati	Sindhupalchok District	2.00	2016	Electrocom and Research Centre	
158	Chhandi Khola Hydropower Station	Gandaki	Lamjung District	2.00	2016	Chhyandi Hydropower Co. P. Ltd	
159	Khani Khola Hydropower Station	Bagmati	Lalitpur District	2.00	2016	Khani Khola Hydropower Company Ltd	
160	Tatopani Hydropower Station	Gandaki	Myagdi District	2.00	1995	Nepal Electricity Authority	
161	Upper Richet Khola SHP	Gandaki	Kashigaun, Manbu (Gorkha)	2.00	2024	Upper Richet Hydropower Pvt. Ltd.	
162	Lower Chaku Khola Hydropower Station	Bagmati	Sindhupalchok District	1.80	2013	Laughing Buddha Power Nepal Pvt. Ltd	
163	Middle Chaku Khola Hydropower Station	Bagmati	Sindhupalchok District	1.80	2013	Laughing Budha Power Nepal	
164	Thoppal Khola Hydropower Station	Bagmati	Dhading District	1.65	2007	Thoppal Khola Hydropower Company	
165	Seti Hydropower Station	Gandaki	Pokhara	1.50	1985	Nepal Electricity Authority	
166	Theule Khola Hydropower Station	Gandaki	Baglung District	1.50	2018	Barahi Hydropower Pvt Ltd	
167	Tinau Hydropower Plant	Lumbini	Rupandehi District	1.024	1981	Nepal Electricity Authority	
168	Fewa Hydropower Station	Gandaki	Pokhara	1.00	1969	Nepal Electricity Authority	
169	Sundarijal Small Hydropower Station	Bagmati	Kathmandu District	0.64	1934	Nepal Electricity Authority	
			Total	3241.584			

== Solar power stations ==
As of 4 March 2025

S.N.	Power station	Location	Capacity (MW)	Commissioned	Owner	Refs.
1	Nuwakot Solar Power Station	Bidur, Nuwakot	25.000	2020	Nepal Electricity Authority	
2	Mithila Solar PV Station	Begadawar (Dhanusha)	10.000	2021	Eco Power Development Pvt. Ltd	
3	Mithila 2 Solar PV Station	Dhanusha District	10.000	2022	Eco Global Power Development Pvt. Ltd	
4	Solar PV Project Banke, block-2	Raniyapur (Banke)	10.000	2023	Pure Energy Ltd	
5	Solar PV Project, Raniyapur, Block 1	Raniyapur (Banke)	10.000	2024	Pure Energy Ltd	
6	Shivasatachhi Jhapa Solar Project	Panchganchi (Jhapa)	10.000	2024	Jhapa Energy Limited	
7	Butwal Solar PV Project	Rupandehi	8.500	2020	Ridi Power Company Ltd.	
8	Utility Scale Solar PV, Grid Connected Solar Project, Morang	Banigama (Morang)	6.800	2023	G I Solar Pvt. Ltd,	
9	Bel Chautara Solar Farm Project	Khairenitar (Tanahu)	5.000	2021	Solar Farm Pvt. Ltd.	
10	Solar PV Pratappur, Grid Connected Solar PV (VGF), Nawalpara	Pratappur (Nawalparasi)	5.000	2022	National Solar Power Company PVt. Ltd.	
11	Som Radha Krishna Solar Farm Project (VGF)	Rupakot (Kaski)	4.400	2022	Nepal Solar Farm Ltd.	
12	Chandranigahpur Solar Project	Rautahat District	4.000	2021	Api Power Company Pvt. Ltd	
13	Grid-Connected Solar Power Project, Dhalkebar, 33 kV S/S	Dhalkebar (Dhanusha)	3.000	2022	Sagarmatha Energy & Construction Pvt. Ltd.	
14	Grid Connected Solar PV Project, Ramgram, Nawalparasi	Nawalparasi District	2.000	2023	Saurya Bidhyut Power Pvt. Ltd	
15	Bishnu Priya Solar Farm Project	Ramnagar (Nawalparasi)	1.000	2018	Surya Power Company P. Ltd.	
16	Solar Power Project, Dhalkebar 11 kV S/S	Dhalkebar (Dhanusha)	1.000	2022	Api Power Company Ltd.	
17	Solar Power Project, Simara, 11 kV S/S		1.000	2022	Api Power Company Ltd.	
18	Solar Energy	Bungamati (Lalitpur)	0.680	2011	Katthmandu Upatyaka Khanepani Byawasthapan Board	
		Total	117.38			

=== Upcoming Solar power projects ===
As of 7 September 2025

Solar power station	Capacity (MW)	Location	Commissioning year (planned)
Dhalkebar Solar PV Project	120	Mahottari District	2025
Barju Solar Project	50	Sunsari District	2025
Parwanipur Solar Farm	30	Bara District	2025

== Diesel power stations ==
As of 4 March 2025

S.N.	Name	Location	Capacity (MW)	Commissioned	Owner	Refs
1	Duhabi Multifuel Center	Morang	39	1997	Nepal Electricity Authority	
2	Hetauda Diesel Center	Makwanpur	14.41	2012	Nepal Electricity Authority	
		Total	53.41			

== Co-generation plants ==
As of 4 March 2025

S/N	Hydropower	Province	Location	Capacity (MW)	Commissioned	Owner	Refs
1	Everest Cogeneration Electricity Project	Madhesh	Birgunj, Parsa	3.000	2021	Everest Sugar and Chemical Industries ltd	
2	Indushankar Cogeneration and Transmission Project	Madhesh	Haripur (Sarlahi)	3.000	2022	Indu Shnakar Chini Udyog Ltd	
			Total	6.000			

== Hydropower stations under construction ==
As of 4 March 2025

S.N.	Hydropower station	Province	Location	Capacity (MW)	Estimated date of completion	Owner	Refs
1	Arun III	Koshi	Sankhuwasabha	900	2024	Satluj Jal Vidyut Nigam (SJVN)	
2	Tila 1 Hydropower Project	Karnali	Phukot Village, Kalikot	440.00			
3	Tila 2 Hydropower Project	Karnali	Phukot Village, Kalikot	420			
4	Budigandaki HEP	Gandaki	Gorkha	341.00			
5	Upper Tamor	Koshi	Taplejung	285.00			
6	Budi Gandaki Kha	Gandaki		260.000			
7	Upper Trishuli-1 HEP	Bagmati	Rasuwa	216	2027	NWEDC	
8	Bajhang Upper Seti HEP			216	2027	Samriddhi Energy Limited	
9	Chainpur Seti HEP	Sudurpashchim	Melbisauni Village, Bajhang	210.00	2027	Nepal Electricity Authority	
10	Super Tamor HEP	Koshi	Phaktanglung RM, Taplejung	166	2027	Cristal Power Development	
11	Kaligandaki Gorge	Gandaki	Dana Village, Myagdi	164	2026		
12	Lapche Khola	Bagmati	Lamabagar, Dolakha	160		Nasa Hydropower PEI LTD	
13	Tanahu HEP (Previously Known As Upper Seti)	Gandaki	Damauli Tanahu	140	2025	Nepal Electricity Authority	
14	Lower Manang Marsyangdi	Gandaki	Tachi Bagarchhap Village, Manang	139.20	2026	Butwal Power CO LTD [20%]; Qing Yuan Engineering Consulting CO (QYEC) [ Sichuan Provincial Investment Group; Chengdu Xingcheng Investment Group	
15	Upper Marsyangdi 1	Gandaki	Taghring Village, Lamjung	138		Upper Marsyangdi Hydropower CO PVT LTD	
16	Manang Marsyangdi	Gandaki	Manang, Chame	135	2025	Butwal Power CO LTD [20%]; Sichuan Provincial Investment Group [ Chengdu Xingcheng Investment Group; Qing Yuan Engineering Consulting CO (QYEC)	
17	Budi Gandaki Ka			130			
18	Tamor Mewa	Koshi	Taplejung, Aathrai Tribeni R.M.	128	2028	Spark Hydroelectric CO LTD	
19	Rasuwa Bhotekoshi	Bagmati	Rasuwa, Chilime Village	120	2025	Chilime Hydropower CO. LTD (CHPCL)	
20	Jagdulla HEP	Karnali	Jagdulla R.M., Dolpa	106		Jagdulla Hydropower Company Limited	
21	Madhya Bhotekoshi	Bagmati	Sindhupalchowk	102	2023	Middle Bhotekoahi Jalbidhyut Company	
22	Mathillo Mailung Khola Hydropower Project	Bagmati	Rasuwa	14.3		Sanima Hydropower	
23	Upper Trisuli 2	Karnali	Haku Village, Jumla	102	2025	Chilime Hydropower CO LTD	
24	Super Trisuli	Gandaki	Gorkha	100	2025	Blue Energy LTD	
25	Tamakoshi V HEP	Bagmati	Gaurishanka RM	99.80	2027	Nepal Electricity Authority	
26	Isuwa Khola Hydropower Project	Koshi	Sankhuwasabha	97.20		Dolakha Nirman Company PVT LTD	
27	Landruk Modi HEP			86.59			
28	Chhameliya (Chhetigad)			85			
29	Lower Solu	Koshi	Solukhumbu	82		Essel Clean Solu Pvt. Ltd.	
30	Budi Gandaki Prok Khola HEP			81			
31	Sanjen Khola			78			
32	Ghunsa Khola HEP			77.50			
33	Middle Mewa HPP			73.50			
34	Simbuwa Khola HEP			70.30			
35	Dudhkoshi-2 (Jaleswar)HPP			70.00			
36	Dudh Khola HEP			65			
37	Bhotekoshi 5 HEP			62			
38	Tiplyang Kaligandaki HEP			58			
39	Nupche Likhu HEP			57.50			
40	Myagdi Khola Hydropower Project			57.30			
41	Himchuli Dordi HEP			57.00			
42	Jum Khola HEP			56			
43	Lower Apsuwa HEP			54			
44	Middle Kaligandaki			53.54			
45	Upper Myagdi -I HEP			53.50			
46	Upper Lapche Khola	Bagmati	Dolakha	52.00		Energy Venture Pvt. Ltd.	
47	Mewa Khola Hydropower Project			50			
48	Marsyangdi Besi			50			
49	Dana Khola HEP			49.95			
50	Khimti II			48.80			
51	Upper Rahughat			48.50			
52	Chujung Khola HEP			48			
53	Upper Balephi			46			
54	Kasuwa Khola HPP			45			
55	Sani Bheri HEP			44.52			
56	Chilun Khola HEP			43.20			
57	Upper Nyasim Khola			43			
58	Upper Madi 0 HEP			43			
59	Ankhu Khola			42.90			
60	Upper Modi A			42			
61	Super Lower Bagmati HEP			41.86			
62	Sankhuwa Khola HEP			41.06			
63	Super Nyadi Hydropower Project			40.27			
64	Isuwa Khola PRoP Cascade HEP			40.10			
65	Khani Khola I	Bagmati	Dolakha	40		Greenlife Energy Pvt. Ltd.	
66	Rahughat			40			
67	Bhotekoshi 1 HEP			40			
68	Lapche Tamakoshi HEP			40			
69	Upper Sankhuwa Khola HEP			40			
70	Balephi Khola HEP			40			
71	Kalika Kaligandaki HEP			38.16			
72	Upper Ankhu Khola HEP			38			
73	Kabeli A			37.60			
74	Tamor Khola -5 HEP			37.50			
75	Upper Trisuli 3B			37			
76	Upper Myagdi			37			
77	Rahughat Mangale			37			
78	Brahmayani HEP			36.52			
79	Nyasim HEP			35			
80	Karuwa Seti HEP			32			
81	Upper Mewa Khola A HEP			31.92			
82	Yaru Khola HEP			30.59			
83	Upper Dudh Khola HPP			30.40			
84	Khani Khola (Dolakha)	Bagmati	Dolakha	30		Sasa Engineering Hydropower Pvt. Ltd.	
85	Likhu Khola HPP			30			
86	Hongu Khola I HPP			30			
87	Palun Khola 1 HEP			30			
88	Mathillo Kabeli HEP			28.10			
89	Upper Khudi			26.00			
90	Super Ankhu Khola Hydropower Project			25.40			
91	Durbang Myagdi Khola			25			
92	Ilep Tatopani Khola HEP			25			
93	Bajra Madi Hydropower Project			24.80			
94	Luja Khola HEP			24.80			
95	Badigad Khola HEP			24.60			
96	Dobhan Khola HEP			24.50			
97	Khare Hydropower Project			24.10			
98	Madme Khola HPP			24			
99	Super Seti HPP			24			
100	Super Melamchi HEP			23.60			
101	Mewa Khola HEP			23			
102	Middle Hongu Khola B HEP			22.90			
103	Mathillo Thulo Khola A HEP			22.50			
104	Balephi A			22.14			
105	Setikhola HEP			22.00			
106	Madhya Hongu Khola A HPP			22.00			
107	Rolwaling Khola HEP			22			
108	Kabeli 3 Cascade HEP			21.93			
109	Nyadi Phidi HPP			21.40			
110	Thulo Khola Hydropower Project			21.30			
111	Jaldigad			21			
112	Aayu Malun Khola HEP			21			
113	Palun Khola Small HEP			21			
114	Suti Khola HEP			21			
115	Langtang Khola Small Hydropower Project			20			
116	Sagu Khola HEP			20			
117	Lower Balephi			20			
118	Upper Seti HEP			20			
119	Kunban Khola HEP			20			
120	Akhu Khola 2 HEP			20			
121	Tattopani Khola HEP			19			
122	Dordi Dudh Khola Small HEP			19			
123	Upper Modi HPP Cascade Project			18.20			
124	Rauje Khola HPP			18			
125	Upper Maiwa HPP			17.85			
126	Chhahare Khola			17.50			
127	Upper Mailung B HEP			17			
128	Thuligad Khola Small PRoP HEP			17			
129	Liping Khola			16.26			
130	Ruru Banchu-1			16.00			
131	Machhe Khola HEP			16			
132	Middle Trishuli Ganga Nadi			15.63			
133	Irkhuwa Khola-B HPP			15.52			
134	Upper Brahmayeni HEP			15.15			
135	Sabha Khola -B HPP			15.10			
136	Upper Kabeli-2 HEP			15			
137	Phalakhu Khola HPP			14.70			
138	Mudi Khola Hydropower Project			14.70			
139	Upper Irkhuwa HPP			14.50			
140	Budum HEP			14.50			
141	Lower Irkhuwa Khola			14.15			
142	Upper Sunigad HEP			13.50			
143	Sisuwa Khola HEP			13.50			
144	Midim 1 HEP			13.42			
145	Middle Mailung (Cascade) HEP			13			
146	Lower Nyadi HEP			12.60			
147	Ruru Banchu Khola-2			12			
148	Super Kabeli Khola HEP			12			
149	Mistri Khola-2 HEP			12			
150	Sunigad			11.05			
151	Upper Tadi			11			
152	Sabha Khola A			10			
153	Siddhi Khola			10			
154	Madya Super Daraundi HPP			10			
155	Upper Sagu HEP			10			
156	Daraudi Nadi HEP			9.84			
157	Upper Daraudi-C HEP			9.82			
158	Daram Khola HEP			9.60			
159	Lower Dudhkunda Hydropower Project			9.48			
160	Siwakhola HEP			9.30			
161	Upper Daraudi Hydropower Project			9.20			
162	Super Ghalemdi HEP			9.14			
163	Sona Khola HEP			9.00			
164	Khimti Ghwang Khola HEP			9			
165	Dudhpokhari Chepe HEP			8.84			
167	Chulepu Khola Hydropower Project			8.52			
168	Upper Daraudi B Small HEP			8.30			
169	Upper Deumai Khola Small HEP			8.30			
170	Tadi Ghyampedi HEP			8.00			
171	Chino Khola HEP			7.90			
172	Upper Piluwa-1 HEP			7.70			
173	Jurimba Khola Small Hydropower Project			7.63			
174	Lower Hewa Khola A HPP			7.30			
175	Shyam Khola HEP			7.25			
176	Lower Tawakhola HEP			7.10			
177	Menchet Khola HPP			7.00			
178	Hidi Khola HEP			6.82			
179	Garchyang Khola			6.60			
180	Rawa Khola HPP			6.50			
181	Darkhola Small HPP			6.50			
182	Malta Bagmati Small HEP			6.50			
183	Upper Mailung -A			6.42			
184	Sabha Khola C HEP (cascade)			6.30			
185	Lower Khani-B HEP			6.20			
186	Lower Bhim Khola HEP			6.05			
187	Upper Chauri Khola			6.00			
188	Buku Khola			6.00			
189	Nyam Nyam			6.00			
190	Rele Khola			6.00			
191	Super Hewa HPP			6.00			
192	Upper Junbesi Khola HEP			5.88			
193	Lower Khorunga			5.50			
194	Sagu Khola 1 HPP			5.50			
195	Middle Tadi HPP			5.50			
196	Bagar Khola HEP			5.50			
197	Rawa Khola HEP			5.40			
198	Jhyaku Khola HPP			5.24			
199	Junbesi			5.20			
200	Jogmai Cascade			5.20			
201	Tadi Khola			5.00			
202	Chauri Khola			5.00			
203	Phalaku Khila HPP			5.00			
204	Lankhuwa Khola			5.00			
205	Buku-Kapati Hydropower Project			5.00			
206	Hewa A Small HEP			5.00			
207	Sangu Khola HPP			5.00			
208	Sepli Khola HEP			5.00			
209	Upper Piluwa HIlls Small HP Project			4.99			
210	Bhim Khola Small HEP			4.96			
211	Upper Piluwa 3 Hpp			4.95			
212	Miwaje Khola HEP			4.95			
213	Upper Pikhuwa Khola HEP			4.90			
214	Khorunga Khola			4.80			
215	Middle Midim			4.80			
216	Syalque Khola Small HEP			4.80			
217	Super Iwa Khola HEP			4.80			
218	Syano Khola HEP			4.75			
219	Lower Thulo Khola HEP (RoR Cascade)			4.75			
220	Super Machha Khola HEP			4.60			
221	Middle Daram Khola-B HPP			4.50			
222	Tallo Indrawati HEP			4.50			
223	Upper Bhurundi Khola-A Small HEP			4.50			
224	Gasali Khola Small HEP			4.50			
225	Pegu Khola Small Hydropower Project			4.35			
226	Lohare Khola			4.20			
227	Pikhuwa Pashupati HEP			4.10			
228	Kisedi Khola Small HEP			4.10			
229	Lower Chirkhuwa			4.06			
230	Rupse Khola			4.00			
231	Upper Lohore SHP			4.00			
232	Lower Mid Rawa Khola HEP			4.00			
234	Upper Bhurundi Khola SHP			3.75			
235	Devdhunga Chaku Khola HEP			3.56			
236	Phedi Khola (Thumlung) Small HPP			3.52			
237	Lower Tara Khola HPP			3.50			
238	Sinkos Khola HEP			3.45			
239	Tinau Khola HPP			3.44			
240	Syarpu HEP			3.30			
241	Sano Milti Khola SHP			3.00			
242	Middle Daram Khola-A HPP			3.00			
243	Tadi Khola Cascade			3.00			
244	Kalinchok Small HEP			3.00			
245	Upper Sardi HEP			2.90			
246	Bhalaudi Khola HEP			2.65			
247	Salankhu Khola			2.50			
248	Saptang Khola HPP			2.50			
249	Mid Rawa Khola HEP			2.50			
250	Upper Parajuli Khola			2.15			
251	Arun Khola 2 HEP			2.00			
252	Taligad Small HPP			2.00			
253	Chepe Khola Cascade Hydropower Project			2.00			
254	Chisang Khola-A Small Hep			1.80			
255	Middle Tara Khola SHP			1.70			
256	Upper Gaddi Gad			1.55			
257	Istul Khola HPP			1.51			
	Total			10,054.7			

== Upcoming hydroelectricity projects ==
As of 4 March 2025

Hydro-power station	Capacity (MW)	Location	Commissioning year (planned)
Mugu Karnali Storage HEP	1902.00		2031
Upper Arun HEP	1063.00		2026
Uttarganga Storage Hydropower Project	828		2031
Upper Marsyangdi-2	600		
Dudhkoshi Storage HEP	600		
Phukot Karnali HEP	480		
Kimathanka Arun HEP	454		
Betan Karnali HEP	439		
Nalsyau Gad Storage HEP	417		
Humla Karnali-2 HEP	335		
Upper Bheri PROP HEP	325		
Langtang Khola Reservoir HEP	310		
Upper Mugu Karnali HEP	306		
Bheri-1 HEP	270		
Humla Karnali 1 HEP	235		
Surke Dudkoshi HEP	188		
Adhikhola Storage HEP	180		
Dudhkoshi-6 HEP	171		
Mugu Karnali HEP	159.62		
Begnas Rupa Storage HEP	150		
Namlan Khola HEP	135		
Lower Barun Khola HPP	132		
Lower Seti (Tanahu) HEP	126		
Upper Chuwa Lurupya Khola PRoP HEP	110.20		
Chauwa Khola Cascade HPP	98.17		
Budhi Gandaki Nadi HEP	91.15		
Rolwaling Khola HEP	88.00		
Upper Tamor A HEP	72.00		
Dudhkoshi Storage (With Dam-Toe Powerhouse)Hydropower Project	70.00		
Seti Nadi-3 HEP	65.00		
Nar Khola HEP	58.90		
Sani Bheri 3 HEP	46.72		
Chunchet Syar Khola HEP	45.00		
Bakan Khola HEP	44.00		
Ghunsa-Tamor HEP	43.00		
Mathillo Simbuwa Khola HEP	40.03		
IKhuwa Khola HEP	40.00		
Upper Apsuwa HEP	35.015		
Middle Chameliya HEP	35.00		
Myardi Khola	30.00		
Myagdi Khola A HEP	30.00		
Hongu Khola HEP	28.90		
Upper Trisuli-I Cascade HEP	24.60		
Super Inkhu Khola HEP	24.22		
Upper Ruru Banchu Khola HEP	23.90		
Apsuwa I HEP	23.00		
Upper Nyasem A HEP	21.00		
Supreme Middle Seti HEP	18.00		
Irkhuwa Khola Ka HEP	15.00		
Upper Seti-1 HEP	13.00		
Upper Mudi HEP	12.73		
Myagdi Khola-B HEP	12.50		
Dhaula Khola HEP	10.80		
Mathillo Chhum Chhum Gad HEP	10.00		
Tawa Khola HEP	9.96		
Nimrung Khola HEP	9.80		
Lower Inkhu HEP	9.80		
Tirija Khola HEP	9.71		
Super Sabha Khola A HPP	9.55		
Nisi Khola HEP	8.80		
Middle Likhu Small HEP	8.60		
Paara Malun PRoP HEP	8.53		
Lower Kalanga Gad HEP	8.00		
Taksu Khola HEP	7.10		
Middle Molung Khola Small HEP	6.00		
Lower Melamchi HEP	4.96		
Upper Melamchi HEP	4.95		
Chhomoron Khola Small HEP	4.89		
Api Naugad HEP	4.89		
Lapa Khola Hydropower Project	4.72		
Super Most Iwa HEP	4.60		
Manahari Khola HEP	4.50		
Chyandi Khola HEP	4.20		
Upper Most Iwa Khola HEP	4.10		
Small Sabha Khola Small Hydropower Project	4.10		
Lower Rupse Khola HEP	1.86		
Lodo Khola Sana HEP	1.60		
Total	11,255.5		

== Special projects ==
As of 4 March 2025

S.N	Project	Province	Location	Capacity (MW)	Owner	Ref
1	Budhigandaki Hydroelectric Project	Gandaki	Gorkha	1200	Nepal Electricity Authority	
2	West Seti Dam	Sudurpashchim		750		
3	Sapta Koshi High Dam Multipurpose Project			3000		
4	Pancheshwar Multipurpose Project			3240		
5	Budhiganga Hydropower Project			20		
6	Naumure Multipurpose Project			218.34		
7	Sunkoshi Marin Diversion Project			38.62		

== Other power stations ==
- Solar power stations
  - Simikot 50 kW
  - Gamgadhi 50 kW
  - Dhobighat Oxidaizing Pond 680.4 kW, Owner:KUKL, Dedicated 11 kV feeder connecting to Teku Substation
- 10 other small hydropower stations (total: 2.460)
- 29 small isolated hydropower stations (total: 5.676 MW)
- Wind power stations
  - Karnali Chisapani Wind Power Project : 10 MW
  - Kagbeni Wind Energy Project : 1MW; Nepal's first wind energy power project.
  - Wind Electric Power Tangbe : 1 MW
  - Mustang Wind Project : 3 MW
  - Banke Wind Energy Project (Udrapur, Banke) : 10 MW
  - Banke Wind Energy Project (Raptisonari, Bejapur, Banke) : 10 MW

== See also ==
- Department of Electricity Development
- List of largest power stations in the world
- List of dams and reservoirs in Nepal
