= Sunkoshi =

Sunkoshi may refer to:

== River ==
- Sun Koshi, a tributary of the Koshi river in Eastern Nepal

== Rural municipalities ==
- Sunkoshi, Okhaldhunga, a rural municipality in Okhaldhunga District, Nepal
- Sunkoshi, Sindhupalchok a rural municipality in Sindhupalchok District, Nepal
- Sunkoshi, Sindhuli a rural municipality in Sindhuli District, Nepal

== Other ==
- Sunkoshi Small Hydropower Plant, a hydropower plant in Nepal
- Sunkoshi Hydropower Station, a hydropower station in Nepal
- Sunkoshi Marin Diversion Project a river diversion project in Nepal
