= Lower Chaku Khola Hydropower Station =

- Location within Nepal
- Official name: Lower Chaku Khola Hydropower Project
- Country: Nepal
- Location: Sindhupalchok District
- Coordinates: 27°52′33″N 85°54′43″E
- Purpose: Power
- Status: Operational
- Owner: Laughing Buddha Power Nepal Pvt. Ltd

Dam and spillways
- Type of dam: Gravity
- Impounds: Chaku River

Power Station
- Commission date: 2070-04-24 BS
- Type: Run-of-the-river
- Installed capacity: 1.8 MW

Lower Chaku Khola Hydropower Station (Nepali: तल्लो चाकु खोला जलविद्युत आयोजना) is a run-of-river hydro-electric plant located in Sindhupalchok District of Nepal. The flow from Lower Chaku River, a tributary of Bhote Koshi River, is used to generate 1.8 MW electricity. The plant is owned and developed by Laughing Buddha Power Nepal Pvt. Ltd, an IPP of Nepal. The plant started generating electricity from 2070-04-24 BS. The generation licence will expire in 2100-05-08 BS, after which the plant will be handed over to the government. The power station is connected to the national grid and the electricity is sold to Nepal Electricity Authority.

== See also ==
- Chaku Khola Hydropower Station (3MW)
- List of power stations in Nepal
