= Baramchi Khola Hydropower Station =

- Location within Nepal
- Official name: Baramchi Khola Hydropower Project
- Country: Nepal
- Location: Sindhupalchok District
- Coordinates: 27°50′11″N 85°46′38″E
- Purpose: Power
- Status: Operational
- Owner: Unique Hydel Pvt Ltd

Dam and spillways
- Type of dam: Gravity
- Impounds: Bramchi River

Power Station
- Commission date: 2071-12-30 BS
- Type: Run-of-the-river
- Installed capacity: 4.2 MW

Baramchi Khola Hydropower Station (Nepali: बारम्ची खोला जलविद्युत आयोजना) is a run-of-river hydro-electric plant located in Sindhupalchok District of Nepal. The flow from Baramchi River is used to generate 4.2 MW electricity. The plant is owned and developed by Unique Hydel Pvt Ltd, an IPP of Nepal. The plant started generating electricity from 2071-12-30 BS. The generation licence will expire in 2101-10-25 BS, after which the plant will be handed over to the government. The power station is connected to the national grid and the electricity is sold to Nepal Electricity Authority.

== See also ==
- List of power stations in Nepal
