= Upper Mardi Hydropower Station =

Upper Mardi Hydropower Project Hydropower Station
- Location within Nepal
- Official name: Upper Mardi Hydropower Project Hydropower Project
- Country: Nepal
- Location: Kaski District
- Coordinates: 28°22′16″N 83°54′30″E
- Purpose: Power
- Status: Operational
- Owners: United Idimardi and R.B. Hydropower Pvt Ltd

Dam and spillways
- Type of dam: Gravity
- Impounds: Mardi River

Power Station
- Commission date: 2076-06-20 BS
- Type: Run-of-the-river
- Hydraulic head: 335 m (1,099 ft)
- Installed capacity: 7 MW

Upper Mardi Hydropower Station (Nepali: माथिल्लो मार्दी जलविद्युत आयोजना) is a run-of-river hydro-electric plant located in Kaski District of Nepal. The flow from Mardi River, a tributary of Gandaki River, is used to generate 7 MW electricity. The design flow is 2.60 m3/s and design gross head is 335 m.

The plant is owned and developed by United Idimardi and R.B. Hydropower Pvt Ltd, an IPP of Nepal. The plant started generating electricity from 2019. The generation licence will expire in 2052, after which the plant will be handed over to the government. The power station is connected to the national grid and the electricity is sold to Nepal Electricity Authority.

== Finance ==
The project was financed by Prime Commercial Bank Limited in conjunction with Century Commercial Bank and Janata Bank as coalition.

== See also ==
- List of power stations in Nepal
