= Dwari Khola Small Hydropower Station =

Dwari Khola SHP Hydropower Station
- Location within Nepal
- Official name: Dwari Khola SHP Hydropower Project
- Country: Nepal
- Location: Dailekh
- Coordinates: 28°55′00″N 81°50′29″E
- Purpose: Power
- Status: Operational
- Owner: Bhugol Energy Development Company Pvt Ltd

Dam and spillways
- Type of dam: Gravity
- Impounds: Dwari River

Power Station
- Commission date: 2074-01-23 BS
- Type: Run-of-the-river
- Hydraulic head: 450.40 m (1,477.7 ft)
- Installed capacity: 3.75 MW

Dwari Khola Small Hydropower Station (Nepali: द्वारी खोला सानो जलविद्युत आयोजना) is a run-of-river hydro-electric plant located in Naumule, Dailekh District of Nepal. The flow from Dwari River is used to generate 3.75 MW electricity. The gross head is 450.40 m and design flow is 1.58 m^{3}/s. The intake is located 3 km upstream of the confluence of the Dwari Khola and Lohore Khola and the powerhouse 300 meters downstream from the confluence.

The plant is owned and developed by Bhugol Energy Development Company Pvt Ltd, an IPP of Nepal. The plant started generating electricity from 2074-01-23BS. The generation licence will expire in 2106-02-25 BS, after which the plant will be handed over to the government. The power station is connected to the national grid at Narayan Nagarpalika and the electricity is sold to Nepal Electricity Authority.

The construction cost of the project was NPR 74 Crore.

== Controversies ==
The local had sold 5m width of land stretching along the pipeline for construction works, but the project used 15 m without compensation.

== See also ==
- List of power stations in Nepal
