= Lower Hewa Hydropower Station =

- Location within Nepal
- Official name: Lower Hewa Hydropower Project
- Country: Nepal
- Location: Panchthar District
- Coordinates: 27°09′02″N 87°46′31″E
- Purpose: Power
- Status: Operational
- Owner: Mountain Hydro Nepal (P.) Ltd

Dam and spillways
- Type of dam: Gravity
- Impounds: Hewa River

Power Station
- Commission date: August 6, 2019
- Type: Run-of-the-river
- Installed capacity: 21.6 MW

Lower Hewa Hydropower Station (Nepali: तल्लो हेवा जलविद्युत आयोजना) is a run-of-river hydro-electric plant located in Panchthar District of Nepal. The flow from Hewa River, a tributary of Tamor River, is used to generate 21.6 MW electricity.

The plant is owned and developed by Mountain Hydro Nepal (P.) Ltd, an IPP of Nepal. The plant started generating electricity from August 6, 2019. The generation licence will expire in July 23, 2048, after which the plant will be handed over to the government. The power station is connected to the national grid and the electricity is sold to Nepal Electricity Authority.

This power plant may get inundated if Tamor Hydropower Project will be constructed in its downstream.

== See also ==
- List of power stations in Nepal
