= Radhi Small Hydropower Station =

- Location within Nepal
- Official name: Radhi Small Hydropower Project
- Country: Nepal
- Location: Lamjung District
- Coordinates: 28°23′48″N 84°25′45″E
- Purpose: Power
- Status: Operational
- Owner: Radhi Bidyut Co. Ltd

Dam and spillways
- Type of dam: Gravity
- Impounds: Radhi River

Power Station
- Commission date: 2071-02-31 BS
- Type: Run-of-the-river
- Installed capacity: 4.4 MW

Radhi Small Hydropower Station (Nepali: राधी सानो जलविद्युत आयोजना) is a run-of-river hydro-electric plant located in Lamjung District of Nepal. The flow from Radhi River is used to generate 4.4 MW electricity. The design flow is 0.874 m3/s and head is 617 m.

The plant is owned and developed by Radhi Bidyut Co. Ltd, an IPP of Nepal. The plant started generating electricity from 2071-02-31BS. The generation licence will expire in 2103-01-27 BS, after which the plant will be handed over to the government. The power station is connected to the national grid and the electricity is sold to Nepal Electricity Authority.

== See also ==
- List of power stations in Nepal
