= Nau Gad Khola Hydropower Station =

- Location within Nepal
- Official name: Nau Gad Khola Hydropower Project
- Country: Nepal
- Location: Darchula District
- Coordinates: 29°41′15″N 80°36′38″E
- Purpose: Power
- Status: Operational
- Owner: Api Power Company Pvt. Ltd

Dam and spillways
- Type of dam: Gravity
- Impounds: Naugad River

Power Station
- Commission date: 2072-05-02 BS
- Type: Run-of-the-river
- Installed capacity: 8.5 MW

Nau Gad Khola Hydropower Station (Nepali: नाउगड जलविद्युत आयोजना) is a run-of-river hydro-electric plant located in Darchula District of Nepal. The flow from Naugad River is used to generate 8.5 MW electricity. The plant is owned and developed by Api Power Company Pvt. Ltd, an IPP of Nepal. The plant started generating electricity from 2072-05-02BS. The generation licence will expire in 2104-03-30 BS, after which the plant will be handed over to the government. The power station is connected to the national grid and the electricity is sold to Nepal Electricity Authority.

== See also ==
- List of power stations in Nepal
