= Tadi Khola Hydropower Station =

- Location within Nepal
- Official name: Tadi Khola Hydropower Project
- Country: Nepal
- Location: Nuwakot District
- Coordinates: 27°55′00″N 85°21′08″E
- Purpose: Power
- Status: Operational
- Owner: Aadi Shakti Bidhut Bikash Co. P. Ltd

Dam and spillways
- Type of dam: Gravity
- Impounds: Tadi Khola River

Power Station
- Commission date: 2058-10-10 BS
- Type: Run-of-the-river
- Installed capacity: 5 MW

Tadi Khola Hydropower Station (Nepali:टाडी खोला जलविद्युत आयोजना) is a run-of-river hydro-electric plant located in Nuwakot District of Nepal. The flow from Tadi River is used to generate 5 MW electricity. The plant is owned and developed by Aadi Shakti Bidhut Bikash Co. P. Ltd, an IPP of Nepal. The plant started generating electricity from 2058-10-10BS. The generation licence will expire in 2103-08-05 BS, after which the plant will be handed over to the government. The power station is connected to the national grid and the electricity is sold to Nepal Electricity Authority.

== See also ==
- List of power stations in Nepal
