= Solu Hydropower Station =

Solu Hydropower Project Hydropower Station
- Location within Nepal
- Official name: Solu Hydropower Project Hydropower Project
- Country: Nepal
- Location: Solukhumbu District
- Coordinates: 27°26′42″N 86°35′00″E
- Purpose: Power
- Status: Operational
- Owner: Upper Solu Hydroelectric Company Pvt Ltd

Dam and spillways
- Type of dam: Gravity
- Impounds: Solu Khola River

Power Station
- Commission date: 2076-12-10 BS
- Type: Run-of-the-river
- Installed capacity: 23.5 MW

Solu Hydropower Project Hydropower Station (Nepali: सोलु जलविद्युत आयोजना) is a run-of-river hydro-electric plant located in Solukhumbu District of Nepal. The flow from Solu River is used to generate 23.5 MW electricity.

The plant is owned and developed by Upper Solu Hydroelectric Company Pvt Ltd, an IPP of Nepal. The plant started generating electricity from 2076 to 2012-10BS. The generation licence will expire in 2105-12-03 BS, after which the plant will be handed over to the government. The power station is connected to the national grid and the electricity is sold to Nepal Electricity Authority. The transmission line was delayed causing water of energy in its initial years.

Upper Solu Hydro Electric Company Limited (USHEC) was established on May 28, 2010, as a private limited corporation, but on April 14, 2016, it was transformed into a public company to allow for public participation. In the Solukhumbu area of Nepal's Province 1, the company operates a 23.5MW Solu HEP. The project is a run-of-the-river (R-o-R) design with a 40% possibility of exceeding the target (Q40). The project, which was created at a total cost of NPR 5,000 million, began operations on March 23, 2020. The 23.5MW Solu HEP project was one of the original Super-Six projects examined by the Nepalese Department of Electricity Development (DoED).

Upper Solu Hydro Electric Company Limited will launch an Initial Public Offering (IPO) (IPO). From Baisakh 22, 2079 B.S., Upper Solu Hydro Electric Company Limited will issue 13,50,000 shares to residents of the project-affected districts in the first round of the IPO. The company donated रू 10,000,000 to the Prime Minister's Natural Disaster Relief Fund in August 2026 following the 2026 Nepal floods.

== See also ==
- List of power stations in Nepal
