= Chaku River =

River of Nepal

Coordinates: 27°52′58″N 85°54′33″E

Chaku River is a tributary of Bhotekoshi River. The river is located in Sindhupalchowk District of central Nepal.

== Infrastructures ==
The river has a large hydropower potential and a number of projects are under development such as

- Chaku Khola Hydropower Station
- Middle Chaku Khola Hydropower Station
- Lower Chaku Khola Hydropower Station

== See also ==
- List of rivers of Nepal
