= Middle Chaku Khola Hydropower Station =

- Location within Nepal
- Official name: Middle Chaku Khola Hydropower Project
- Country: Nepal
- Location: Sindhupalchok District
- Coordinates: 27°52′20″N 85°56′00″E
- Purpose: Power
- Status: Operational
- Owner: Laughing Budha Power Nepal

Dam and spillways
- Type of dam: Gravity
- Impounds: Chaku River

Power Station
- Commission date: 2069-11-15 BS
- Type: Run-of-the-river
- Installed capacity: 1.8 MW

Middle Chaku Khola Hydropower Station (Nepali: मध्य चाकु खोला जलविद्युत आयोजना) is a run-of-river hydro-electric plant located in Sindhupalchok District of Nepal. The flow from Chaku River is used to generate 1.8 MW electricity. The plant is owned and developed by Laughing Budha Power Nepal, an IPP of Nepal. The plant started generating electricity from 2069-11-15BS. The generation licence will expire in 2102-12-06 BS, after which the plant will be handed over to the government. The power station is connected to the national grid and the electricity is sold to Nepal Electricity Authority.

== See also ==
- List of power stations in Nepal
