= Jiri Khola Small Hydropower Station =

- Location within Nepal
- Official name: Jiri Khola Small Hydropower Project
- Country: Nepal
- Location: Dolakha District
- Coordinates: 27°35′06″N 86°14′00″E
- Purpose: Power
- Status: Operational
- Owner: Bojini Company (P.) Ltd

Dam and spillways
- Type of dam: Gravity
- Impounds: Jiri River

Power Station
- Commission date: 2073-03-09 BS
- Type: Run-of-the-river
- Installed capacity: 2.4 MW

Jiri Khola Small Hydropower Station (Nepali: जिरी खोला सानो जलविद्युत आयोजना) is a run-of-river hydro-electric plant located in Dolakha District of Nepal. The flow from Jiri River is used to generate 2.4 MW electricity.

The plant is owned and developed by Bojini Company (P.) Ltd, an IPP of Nepal. The plant started generating electricity from 2071 to 2011-01 BS. The generation licence will expire in 2102-11-16 BS, after which the plant will be handed over to the government. The power station is connected to the national grid and the electricity is sold to Nepal Electricity Authority.

== See also ==
- List of power stations in Nepal
