= Phawa khola Hydropower Station =

Phawa Khola Hydropower Station
- Location within Nepal
- Official name: Phawa Khola Hydropower Project
- Country: Nepal
- Location: Taplejung District
- Coordinates: 27°16′37″N 87°46′22″E
- Purpose: Power
- Status: Operational
- Owner: Shiwani Hydropower Company

Dam and spillways
- Type of dam: Gravity
- Impounds: Phawa River

Power Station
- Commission date: 2073-03-09 BS
- Type: Run-of-the-river
- Installed capacity: 5 MW

Phawa Khola Hydropower Station (Nepali:फावा खोला जलविद्युत आयोजना) is a run-of-river hydro-electric plant located in Taplejung District of Nepal. The flow from Phawa River is used to generate 5 MW electricity.

The plant is owned and developed by Shiwani Hydropower Company, an IPP of Nepal. The generation licence will expire in 2102-06-18 BS, after which the plant will be handed over to the government. The power station is connected to the national grid and the electricity is sold to Nepal Electricity Authority.

== See also ==
- List of power stations in Nepal
