= Pikhuwa Khola Hydropower Station =

- Location within Nepal
- Official name: Pikhuwa Khola Hydropower Project
- Country: Nepal
- Location: Bhojpur District
- Coordinates: 27°08′50″N 87°02′03″E
- Purpose: Power
- Status: Operational
- Owner: Taksar Pikhuwa Khola Hydropower Ltd

Dam and spillways
- Type of dam: Gravity
- Impounds: Pikhuwa River

Power Station
- Commission date: 2076-02-27 BS
- Type: Run-of-the-river
- Installed capacity: 5 MW

Pikhuwa Khola Hydropower Station (Nepali: पिखुवा खोला जलविद्युत आयोजना) is a run-of-river hydro-electric plant located in Bhojpur District of Nepal. The flow from Pikhuwa River is used to generate 8 MW electricity. The plant is owned and developed by Taksar Pikhuwa Khola Hydropower Ltd, an IPP of Nepal. The plant started generating electricity from 2076-02-27BS. The generation licence will expire in 2102-12-06 BS, after which the plant will be handed over to the government. The power station is connected to the national grid and the electricity is sold to Nepal Electricity Authority.

== See also ==
- List of power stations in Nepal
