= Upper Hugdi Hydropower Station =

- Location within Nepal
- Official name: Upper Hugdi Hydropower Project
- Country: Nepal
- Location: Gulmi District
- Coordinates: 28°05′00″N 83°25′17″E
- Purpose: Power
- Status: Operational
- Owner: Ruru Jalbidyut Pariyojana Pvt. Ltd

Dam and spillways
- Type of dam: Gravity
- Impounds: Hugdi River

Power Station
- Commission date: 2071-12-09 BS
- Type: Run-of-the-river
- Installed capacity: 5 MW

Upper Hugdi Hydropower Station (Nepali: माथिल्लो हुगदी जलविद्युत आयोजना) is a run-of-river hydro-electric plant located in Gulmi District of Nepal. The flow from Hugdi River is used to generate 5 MW electricity. The plant is owned and developed by Ruru Jalbidyut Pariyojana Pvt. Ltd, an IPP of Nepal. The plant started generating electricity from 2071-12-09BS. The generation licence will expire in 2104-04-29 BS, after which the plant will be handed over to the government. The power station is connected to the national grid and the electricity is sold to Nepal Electricity Authority.

== See also ==
- List of power stations in Nepal
