= Chake Khola Hydropower Station =

- Location within Nepal
- Official name: Chake Khola Hydropower Project
- Country: Nepal
- Location: Ramechhap District
- Coordinates: 27°37′15″N 86°21′42″E
- Purpose: Power
- Status: Operational
- Owner: Garjang Upatyaka HP Company Limited

Dam and spillways
- Type of dam: Gravity
- Impounds: Chake Khola River

Power Station
- Commission date: 2018
- Type: Run-of-the-river
- Installed capacity: 2.83 MW

Chake Khola Hydropower Station (Nepali: चाके खोला जलविद्युत आयोजना) is a run-of-river hydro-electric plant located in Ramechhap District of Nepal. The flow from Chake River is used to generate 2.83 MW electricity.

The plant is owned and developed by Garjang Upatyaka HP Company Limited, an IPP of Nepal. The plant started generating electricity from 2018(2074-08-28BS) and the generation licence will expire in 2049 (2105-11-20 BS) after which the plant will be handed over to the government. The power station is connected to the national grid and the electricity is sold to Nepal Electricity Authority.

== See also ==
- List of power stations in Nepal
