= Jhyari Khola Hydropower Station =

- Location within Nepal
- Official name: Jhyari Khola Hydropower Project
- Country: Nepal
- Location: Sindhupalchok District
- Coordinates: 27°44′30″N 85°41′02″E
- Purpose: Power
- Status: Operational
- Owners: Electrocom and Research Centre

Dam and spillways
- Type of dam: Gravity
- Impounds: Jhyari River

Power Station
- Commission date: 2073-04-01 BS
- Type: Run-of-the-river
- Installed capacity: 2 MW

Jhyari Khola Hydropower Station (Nepali: झ्यारी खोला जलविद्युत आयोजना) is a run-of-river hydro-electric plant located in Sindhupalchok District of Nepal. The flow from Jhyari River is used to generate 2 MW electricity. The plant is owned and developed by Electrocom and Research Centre, an IPP of Nepal. The plant started generating electricity from 2073-04-01BS. The generation licence will expire in 2104-02-29 BS, after which the plant will be handed over to the government. The power station is connected to the national grid and the electricity is sold to Nepal Electricity Authority.

== See also ==
- List of power stations in Nepal
