= Bhairab Kund Khola Hydropower Station =

Dam in Sindhupalchok, Nepal

- Location within Nepal
- Official name: Bhairab Kund Khola Hydropower Project
- Country: Nepal
- Location: Sindhupalchok District
- Coordinates: 27°55′52″N 85°55′53″E
- Purpose: Power
- Status: Operational
- Owner: Bhairabkund Hydropower Pvt. Ltd.

Dam and spillways
- Type of dam: Gravity
- Impounds: Bhairab Kund River

Power Station
- Commission date: 2071-02-22 BS
- Type: Run-of-the-river
- Installed capacity: 3 MW

Bhairab Kund Khola Hydropower Station (Nepali:भैरव कुण्ड खोला जलविद्युत आयोजना) is a run-of-river hydro-electric plant located in Larcha, Sindhupalchok District of Nepal. The flow from Bhairab Kund River, a tributary of Bhote Koshi River, is used to generate 3 MW electricity. The plant is owned and developed by Bhairabkund Hydropower Pvt. Ltd., an IPP of Nepal. The plant started generating electricity from 2071-02-22 BS. The generation licence will expire in 2101-05-18 BS, after which the plant will be handed over to the government. The power station is connected to the national grid and the electricity is sold to Nepal Electricity Authority.

== See also ==
- List of power stations in Nepal
