= Ghalemdi Khola Hydropower Station =

- Location within Nepal
- Official name: Ghalemdi Khola Hydropower Project
- Country: Nepal
- Location: Myagdi District
- Coordinates: 28°31′30″N 83°42′00″E
- Purpose: Power
- Status: Operational
- Owner: Ghalemdi Hydro Limited

Dam and spillways
- Type of dam: Gravity
- Impounds: Ghalemdi River

Power Station
- Commission date: 2076-11-05 BS
- Type: Run-of-the-river
- Installed capacity: 5 MW

Ghalemdi Khola Hydropower Station (Nepali:घलेम्दी खोला जलविद्युत आयोजना) is a run-of-river hydro-electric plant located in Myagdi District of Nepal. The flow from Ghalemdi River is used to generate 5 MW electricity. The plant is owned and developed by Ghalemdi Hydro Limited, an IPP of Nepal.

The plant started generating electricity in 2020 and the generation licence will expire in 2049, after which the plant will be handed over to the government. The power station is connected to the national grid and the electricity is sold to Nepal Electricity Authority.

The project cost is NPR 1.15 billion. An IPO was issued in 2075 B.S.

== See also ==
- List of power stations in Nepal
