= Kapadigad Hydropower Station =

- Location within Nepal
- Official name: Kapadigad Hydropower Project
- Country: Nepal
- Location: Doti District
- Coordinates: 29°00′00″N 80°47′05″E
- Purpose: Power
- Status: Operational
- Owner: Salmanidevi Hydropower Pvt Ltd

Dam and spillways
- Type of dam: Gravity
- Impounds: Kapadigad River

Power Station
- Commission date: 2076-02-25 BS
- Type: Run-of-the-river
- Installed capacity: 3.33 MW

Kapadigad Hydropower Station (Nepali: कपाडीगड खोला जलविद्युत आयोजना) is a run-of-river hydro-electric plant located in Doti District of Nepal. The flow from Kapadigad River is used to generate 3.33 MW electricity. The design flow is 3.81 m^{3}/s and gross head is 170 m.

The plant is owned and developed by Salmanidevi Hydropower Pvt Ltd, an IPP of Nepal. The plant started generating electricity from 2076-02-25BS. The generation licence will expire in 2105-09-13 BS, after which the plant will be handed over to the government. The power station is connected to the national grid and the electricity is sold to Nepal Electricity Authority.

== Leadership ==
The Chairperson of the project is Mrs. Uma Dahal. Followingly, it has 3 Managing Directors and an independent Director.

== See also ==
- List of power stations in Nepal
