= Ridi Khola Hydropower Station =

- Location within Nepal
- Official name: Ridi Khola Hydropower Project
- Country: Nepal
- Location: Palpa District
- Coordinates: 27°55′30″N 83°23′30″E
- Purpose: Power
- Status: Operational
- Owner: Ridi Hydropower Development Co P Ltd

Dam and spillways
- Type of dam: Gravity
- Impounds: Ridi River

Power Station
- Commission date: 2070-04-24 BS
- Type: Run-of-the-river
- Installed capacity: 1.8 MW

Ridi Khola Hydropower Station (Nepali: रिडी खोला जलविद्युत आयोजना) is a run-of-river hydro-electric plant located in Palpa District of Nepal. The flow from Ridi River, a tributary of Kali Gandaki River, is used to generate 1.8 MW electricity. The plant is owned and developed by Ridi Hydropower Development Co P Ltd, an IPP of Nepal. The plant started generating electricity from 2070-04-24 BS. The generation licence will expire in 2100-05-08 BS, after which the plant will be handed over to the government. The power station is connected to the national grid and the electricity is sold to Nepal Electricity Authority.

== See also ==
- List of power stations in Nepal
