= Mardi Khola Hydropower Station =

- Location within Nepal
- Official name: Mardi Khola Hydropower Project
- Country: Nepal
- Coordinates: 28°19′10″N 83°52′55″E
- Purpose: Power
- Status: Operational
- Owner: Gandaki Hydropower Development Co. P. Ltd

Dam and spillways
- Type of dam: Gravity
- Impounds: Mardi River

Power Station
- Commission date: 2066-10-08 BS
- Type: Run-of-the-river
- Installed capacity: 4.8 MW

Mardi Khola Hydropower Station (Nepali: मार्दी खोला जलविद्युत आयोजना) is a run-of-river hydro-electric plant located in Kaski District of Nepal. The flow from Mardi River, a tributary of Kali Gandaki River, is used to generate 4.8 MW electricity. The plant is owned and developed by Gandaki Hydropower Development Co. P. Ltd, an IPP of Nepal. The plant started generating electricity from 2066-10-08 BS. The generation licence will expire in 2098-10-07 BS, after which the plant will be handed over to the government. The power station is connected to the national grid and the electricity is sold to Nepal Electricity Authority.

== See also ==
- List of power stations in Nepal
