= Thapa Khola Hydropower Station =

- Location within Nepal
- Official name: Thapa Khola Hydropower Project
- Country: Nepal
- Location: Mustang District
- Coordinates: 28°42′32″N 83°38′52″E
- Purpose: Power
- Status: Operational
- Owner: Mount Kailash Energy Co. Ltd

Dam and spillways
- Type of dam: Gravity
- Impounds: Thapa River

Power Station
- Commission date: 2074-08-22 BS
- Type: Run-of-the-river
- Installed capacity: 11.2 MW

Thapa Khola Hydropower Station (Nepali: थापा खोला जलविद्युत आयोजना) is a run-of-river hydro-electric plant located in Mustang District of Nepal. The flow from Thapa River is used to generate 11.2 MW electricity. The plant is owned and developed by Mount Kailash Energy Co. Ltd, an IPP of Nepal. The plant started generating electricity from 2074-08-22BS. The generation licence will expire in 2104-01-25 BS, after which the plant will be handed over to the government. The power station is connected to the national grid and the electricity is sold to Nepal Electricity Authority.

== See also ==
- List of power stations in Nepal
