= Rudi Khola-B Hydropower Station =

- Location within Nepal
- Official name: Rudi Khola-B Hydropower Station
- Country: Nepal
- Location: Kaski District
- Coordinates: 28°16′39″N 84°13′00″E
- Purpose: Power
- Status: Operational
- Owner: Bindhyabasini Hydropower Development Co. Pvt Ltd

Dam and spillways
- Type of dam: Gravity
- Impounds: Rudi River

Power Station
- Commission date: 2076-11-05 BS
- Type: Run-of-the-river
- Hydraulic head: 299.81 m (983.6 ft)
- Installed capacity: 6.6 MW

Rudi Khola-B Hydropower Station (Nepali: रुदी खोला जलविद्युत आयोजना) is a run-of-river hydro-electric plant located in Kaski District of Nepal. The flow from Rudi River is generating 6.6 MW electricity. The design head is 325 m and flow is 2.55 m^{3}/s at Q40%

The plant is owned and developed by Bindhyabasini Hydropower Development Co. Pvt Ltd, an IPP of Nepal. The plant started generating electricity from 2076-11-05BS. The generation licence will expire in 2109-02-25 BS, after which the plant will be handed over to the government. The power station is connected to the national grid and the electricity is sold to Nepal Electricity Authority.

== See also ==
- List of power stations in Nepal
