= Upper Naugad Hydropower Station =

Upper Naugad Gad Hydropower Project Hydropower Station
- Location within Nepal
- Official name: Upper Naugad Gad Hydropower Project Hydropower Project
- Country: Nepal
- Location: Darchula District
- Coordinates: 29°43′25″N 80°39′48″E
- Purpose: Power
- Status: Operational
- Owner: Api Power Company Ltd.

Dam and spillways
- Type of dam: Gravity
- Impounds: Naugad River

Power Station
- Commission date: 2076-07-13 BS
- Type: Run-of-the-river
- Hydraulic head: 163.44 m (536.2 ft)
- Turbines: 2x 4MW Francis type
- Installed capacity: 8 MW
- Annual generation: 51.69 GWh

Upper Naugad Hydropower Station (Nepali: माथिल्लो नउगड जलविद्युत आयोजना) is a run-of-river hydro-electric plant located in Darchula District of Nepal. The flow from Naugad River is used to generate 8 MW electricity. The design flow is and gross head is 163.44 .

The plant is owned and developed by Api Power Company Ltd., an IPP of Nepal. The plant started generating electricity from 2076-07-13BS. The generation licence will expire in 2108-09-14 BS, after which the plant will be handed over to the government. The power station is connected to the national grid at Balanch of Shailya Shikhar Municipality and the electricity is sold to Nepal Electricity Authority.

== See also ==
- List of power stations in Nepal
