= Bijayapur-1 Hydropower Station =

Hydroelectric power station in Nepal

- Location within Nepal
- Official name: Bijayapur-1 Hydropower Project
- Country: Nepal
- Location: Kaski District
- Coordinates: 27°50′11″N 85°48′15″E
- Purpose: Power
- Status: Operational
- Owner: Bhagawati Hydropower Development Company

Dam and spillways
- Type of dam: Gravity
- Impounds: Bijayapur River

Power Station
- Commission date: 2069-05-05 BS
- Type: Run-of-the-river
- Installed capacity: 4.5 MW

Bijayapur-1 Hydropower Station (Nepali: बिजयपुर-१ जलविद्युत आयोजना) is a run-of-river hydro-electric plant located in Kaski District of Nepal. The flow from Bijayapur River is used to generate 4.5 MW electricity. The plant is owned and developed by Bhagawati Hydropower Development Company, an IPP of Nepal. The plant started generating electricity from 2069-05-05 BS. The generation licence will expire in 2101-12-21 BS, after which the plant will be handed over to the government. The power station is connected to the national grid and the electricity is sold to Nepal Electricity Authority.

== See also ==
- List of power stations in Nepal
