= Sunkoshi Small Hydropower Plant =

Sunkoshi Small Hydropower Project
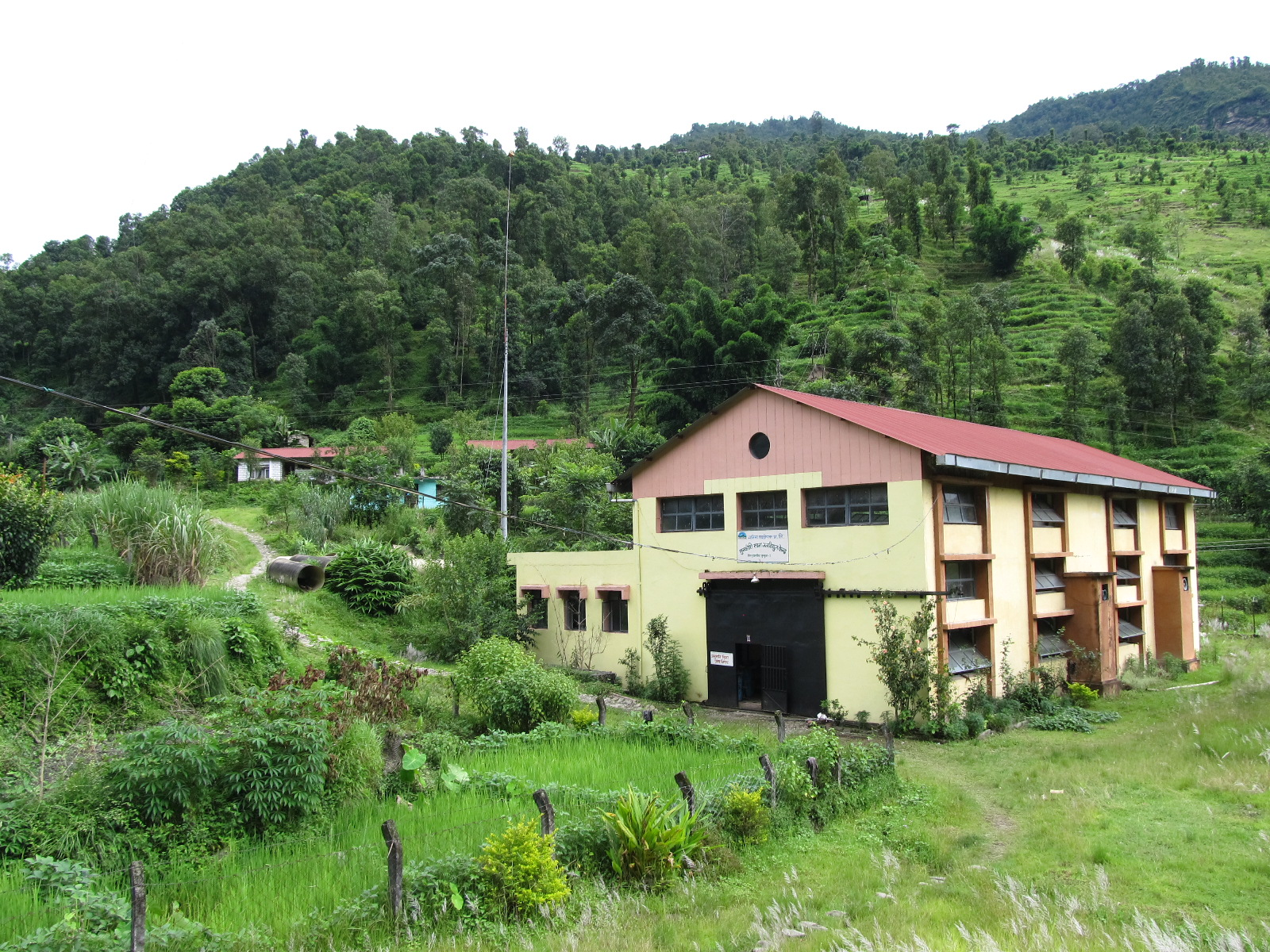

- Location within Nepal
- Official name: Sanima Hydropower
- Country: Nepal
- Location: Sindhupalchowk District
- Coordinates: 27°46′55″N 85°55′10″E
- Purpose: Power
- Status: In operation
- Construction began: 2003
- Opening date: 2005
- Owner: Sanima Hydropower Pvt. Ltd.

Dam and spillways
- Type of dam: Boulder lined
- Impounds: Sunkoshi River

Sunkoshi Small Hydropower Plant
- Coordinates: 27°46′35″N 85°53′26″E
- Commission date: 2005
- Type: Run-of-the-river
- Turbines: 2*1.25 MW horizontal Turgo(Impulse type)
- Installed capacity: 2.5 MW
- Annual generation: 14.38 GWh

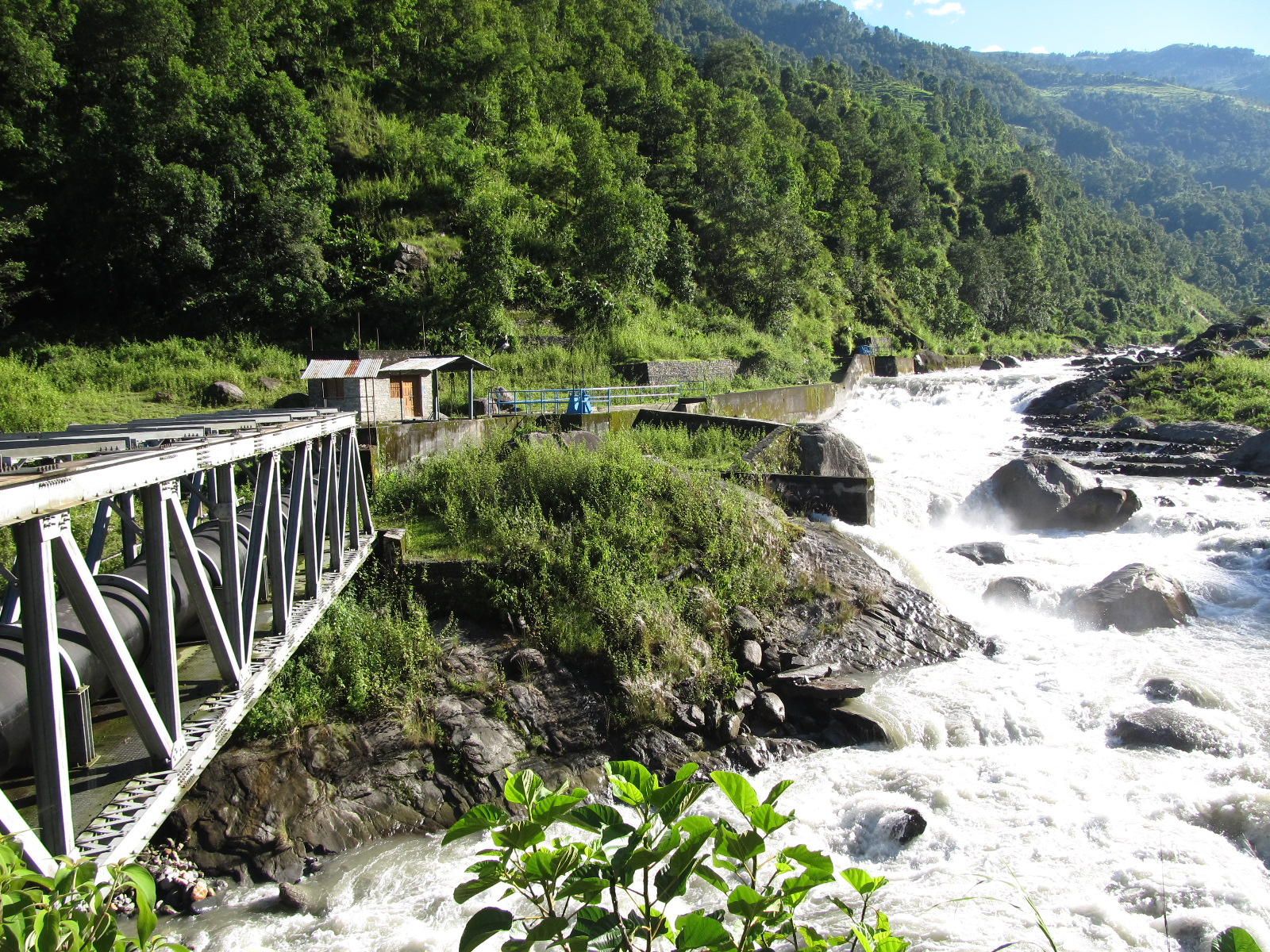
Intake area of powerplant

Sunkoshi Small Hydropower Plant is located in Dhuskun of Sindhupalchok District in central Nepal. It downstream where the Sunkoshi and Bhotekoshi Rivers meet. Construction of the plant began in 2003 and was completed in 2005.

The plant is a run-of-river project with installed capacity of 2.5 MW, design flow of 2.7 m3/s and gross head of 124.5m.

This is only project in Nepal to utilize pressurized Glass Fibre reinforced Plastic (GRP) pipe for flow conduction.

The plant has two units with Turgo turbine (2 *1250 KW). The power is evacuated via 33kVA transmission line to switch-yard of Sunkoshi Hydropower Station (9MW)

The plant was completely submerged by 2014 Sunkoshi blockage.

== See also ==
- List of power stations in Nepal
