= Ankhu Khola-1 Hydropower Station =

Dam in Dhading, Nepal

- Location within Nepal
- Official name: Ankhu Khola-1 Hydropower Project
- Country: Nepal
- Location: Dhading District
- Coordinates: 28°00′00″N 84°55′55″E
- Purpose: Power
- Status: Operational
- Owner: Ankhu Jalvidut Co. Pvt. Ltd

Dam and spillways
- Type of dam: Gravity
- Impounds: Ankhu River

Power Station
- Commission date: 2070-05-08 BS
- Type: Run-of-the-river
- Installed capacity: 8.4 MW

Ankhu Khola-1 Hydropower Station (Nepali: आखु खोला जलविद्युत आयोजना), is a run-of-river hydro-electric plant located in Dhading District of Nepal. The flow from Ankhu River, a tributary of Trishuli River, is used to generate 8.4 MW electricity. The plant is owned and developed by Ankhu Jalvidut Co. Pvt. Ltd, an IPP of Nepal. The plant started generating electricity from 2070-05-08 BS. The generation licence will expire in 2101-08-25 BS, after which the plant will be handed over to the government. The power station is connected to the national grid and the electricity is sold to Nepal Electricity Authority.

== See also ==
- List of power stations in Nepal
