= Theule Khola Hydropower Station =

Theule Khola HPP Hydropower Station
- Location within Nepal
- Official name: Theule Khola HPP Hydropower Project
- Country: Nepal
- Location: Baglung District
- Coordinates: 28°10′20″N 83°38′25″E
- Purpose: Power
- Status: Operational
- Owner: Barahi Hydropower Pvt Ltd.

Dam and spillways
- Type of dam: Gravity
- Impounds: Theule River

Power Station
- Commission date: 2075-03-24 BS
- Type: Run-of-the-river
- Installed capacity: 1.5 MW

Theule Khola Hydropower Station (Nepali: ठिउले खोला जलविद्युत आयोजना) is a run-of-river hydro-electric plant located in Baglung District of Nepal. The flow from Theule River is used to generate 1.5 MW electricity.

The plant is owned and developed by Barahi Hydropower Pvt Ltd, an IPP of Nepal. The plant started generating electricity from 2075-03-24BS. The generation licence will expire in 2107-03-27 BS, after which the plant will be handed over to the government. The power station is connected to the national grid and the electricity is sold to Nepal Electricity Authority.

The power generated from the project will make up around 40 per cent of electricity demand for the district.

The project cost was NPR 345 million.

== See also ==
- List of power stations in Nepal
