= Sabha Khola Hydropower Station =

- Location within Nepal
- Official name: Sabha Khola Hydropower Project
- Country: Nepal
- Location: Sankhuwasabha District
- Coordinates: 27°23′19″N 87°17′35″E
- Purpose: Power
- Status: Operational
- Owner: Dibyaswari Hydropower P Ltd

Dam and spillways
- Type of dam: Gravity
- Impounds: Sabha River

Power Station
- Commission date: 2074-06-04 BS
- Type: Run-of-the-river
- Installed capacity: 3.3 MW

Sabha Khola Hydropower Station (Nepali:साबा खोला जलविद्युत आयोजना) is a run-of-river hydro-electric plant located in Sankhuwasabha District of Nepal. The flow from Sabha River is used to generate 3.3 MW electricity. The plant is owned and developed by Dibyaswari Hydropower P Ltd, an IPP of Nepal. The plant started generating electricity from 2074-06-04BS. The generation licence will expire in 2104-10-03 BS, after which the plant will be handed over to the government. The power station is connected to the national grid and the electricity is sold to Nepal Electricity Authority.

== Finance ==
Nepal Bank Limited in association with NIDC Development Bank, Kasthamandap Development Bank and ACE Development Bank financed the project. 70% amount was financed by the banks and remaining 30% was collected from equity.

== See also ==
- List of power stations in Nepal
