= Madkyu Khola Hydropower Station =

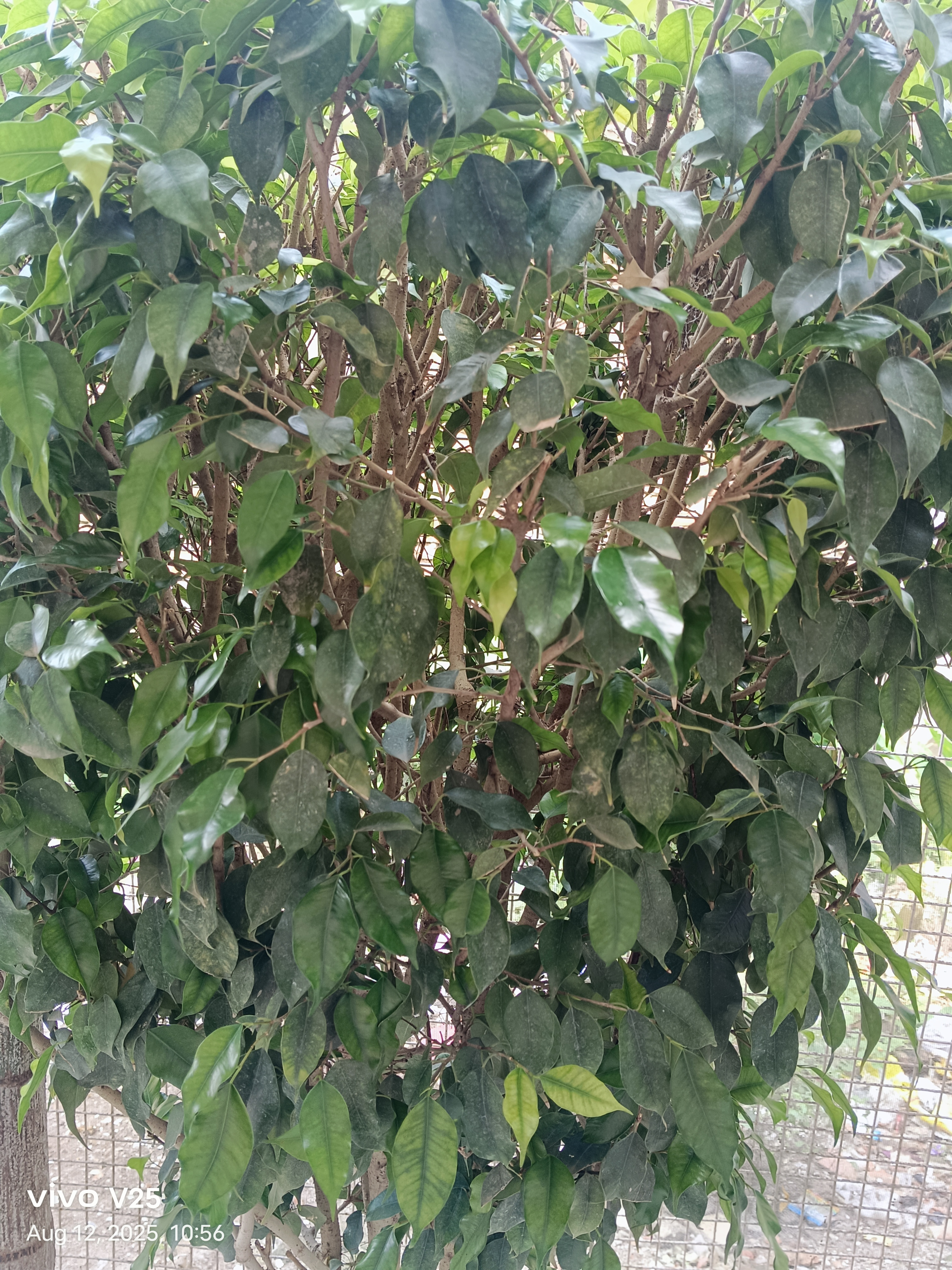

- Location within Nepal
- Official name: Madkyu Khola Hydropower Project
- Country: Nepal
- Location: Kaski District
- Coordinates: 28°21′40″N 84°08′45″E
- Purpose: Power
- Status: Operational
- Owner: Silkes Hydropower Pvt.Ltd

Dam and spillways
- Type of dam: Gravity
- Impounds: Madkyu River

Power Station
- Commission date: 2074-12-19 BS
- Type: Run-of-the-river
- Installed capacity: 13 MW

Madkyu Khola Hydropower Station (Nepali:मड्क्यु खोला जलविद्युत आयोजना) is a run-of-river hydro-electric plant located in Kaski District of Nepal. The flow from Madkyu River is used to generate 13 MW electricity.

The plant is owned and developed by Silkes Hydropower Pvt.Ltd, an IPP of Nepal. The plant started generating electricity from 2074-12-19BS. The generation licence will expire in 2105-11-20 BS, after which the plant will be handed over to the government. The power station was connected to the national grid in 2018 and the electricity is sold to Nepal Electricity Authority.

== See also ==
- List of power stations in Nepal
