= Bagmati Nadi Hydropower Station =

- Location within Nepal
- Official name: Bagmati Nadi Hydropower Project
- Country: Nepal
- Location: Makawanpur District
- Coordinates: 27°30′21″N 85°15′20″E
- Purpose: Power
- Status: Operational
- Owner: Mandu Hydropower Pvt. Ltd.

Dam and spillways
- Type of dam: Gravity
- Impounds: Bagmati River

Power Station
- Commission date: 2075-12-19 BS
- Type: Run-of-the-river
- Installed capacity: 22 MW

Bagmati Nadi Hydropower Station (Nepali: बागमती नदी जलविद्युत आयोजना) is a run-of-river hydro-electric plant located in Makawanpur District of Nepal. The flow from Bagmati River is used to generate 22 MW electricity.

The plant is owned and developed by Mandu Hydropower Pvt. Ltd., an IPP of Nepal. The construction work started in 2016. The finishing was delayed by about 6 months owing to delay in penstock instalment. The plant started generating electricity from 2075-12-19BS. The generation licence will expire in 2106-03-18 BS, after which the plant will be handed over to the government. The power station is connected to the national grid and the electricity is sold to Nepal Electricity Authority.

== Finance ==
The total cost of the project is NPR 4 billion. Prime Bank and 11 other bank invested 70% in the project and the remaining 30% was invested through equity share.

== See also ==
- List of power stations in Nepal
