= Siuri Khola Hydropower Station =

- Location within Nepal
- Official name: Siuri Khola Hydropower Project
- Country: Nepal
- Location: Lamjung District
- Coordinates: 28°20′24″N 84°27′41″E
- Purpose: Power
- Status: Operational
- Owner: Nyadi Group Pvt Ltd

Dam and spillways
- Type of dam: Gravity
- Impounds: Siuri River

Power Station
- Commission date: 2069-06-30 BS
- Type: Run-of-the-river
- Installed capacity: 5 MW

Siuri Khola Hydropower Station (Nepali:सिउरी खोला जलविद्युत आयोजना) is a run-of-river hydro-electric plant located in Lamjung District of Nepal. The flow from Siuri River is used to generate 5 MW electricity. The plant is owned and developed by Nyadi Group Pvt Ltd, an IPP of Nepal. The plant started generating electricity from 2069-06-30 BS. The generation licence will expire in 2101-05-29 BS, after which the plant will be handed over to the government. The power station is connected to the national grid and the electricity is sold to Nepal Electricity Authority.

== See also ==
- List of power stations in Nepal
