= Midim Khola Hydropower Station =

- Location within Nepal
- Official name: Midim Khola Hydropower Project
- Country: Nepal
- Location: Lamjung District
- Coordinates: 28°10′53″N 84°17′30″E
- Purpose: Power
- Status: Operational
- Owner: Union Hydropower P.Ltd

Dam and spillways
- Type of dam: Gravity
- Impounds: Midim Khola River

Power Station
- Commission date: 2074-10-15 BS
- Type: Run-of-the-river
- Installed capacity: 3 MW

Midim Khola Hydropower Station (Nepali:मिदिम खोला जलविद्युत आयोजना) is a run-of-river hydro-electric plant located in Lamjung District of Nepal. The flow from Midim Khola River is used to generate 3 MW electricity. The plant is owned and developed by Union Hydropower P.Ltd, an IPP of Nepal. The plant started generating electricity from 2074-10-15BS. The generation licence will expire in 2104-05-05 BS, after which the plant will be handed over to the government. The power station is connected to the national grid and the electricity is sold to Nepal Electricity Authority.

== See also ==
- List of power stations in Nepal
