= Tungun - Thosne Khola Hydropower Station =

- Location within Nepal
- Official name: Tungun - Thosne Khola Hydropower Project
- Country: Nepal
- Location: Lalitpur District
- Coordinates: 27°29′15″N 85°19′53″E
- Purpose: Power
- Status: Operational
- Owner: Khani Khola Hydropower Company Ltd

Dam and spillways
- Type of dam: Gravity
- Impounds: Tugun River

Power Station
- Commission date: 2073-08-09 BS
- Type: Run-of-the-river
- Installed capacity: 4.36 MW

Tungun - Thosne Khola Hydropower Station (Nepali: तुगुन ठोसे खोला जलविद्युत आयोजना) is a run-of-river hydro-electric plant located in Lalitpur District of Nepal. The flow from Tugun River is used to generate 4.36 MW electricity. The plant is owned and developed by Khani Khola Hydropower Company Ltd, an IPP of Nepal. The plant started generating electricity from 2073-08-09BS. The generation licence will expire in 2104-11-02 BS, after which the plant will be handed over to the government. The power station is connected to the national grid and the electricity is sold to Nepal Electricity Authority.

== See also ==
- List of power stations in Nepal
