= Khani Khola Hydropower Station =

- Location within Nepal
- Official name: Khani Khola Hydropower Project
- Country: Nepal
- Location: Lalitpur District
- Coordinates: 27°29′10″N 85°18′20″E
- Purpose: Power
- Status: Operational
- Owner: Khani Khola Hydropower Company Ltd

Dam and spillways
- Type of dam: Gravity
- Impounds: Khani River

Power Station
- Commission date: 2073-08-09 BS
- Type: Run-of-the-river
- Installed capacity: 2 MW

Khani Khola Hydropower Station (Nepali: खानी खोला जलविद्युत आयोजना) is a run-of-river hydro-electric plant located in Lalitpur District of Nepal. The flow from Khani River is used to generate 2 MW electricity. The plant is owned and developed by Khani Khola Hydropower Company Ltd, an IPP of Nepal. The plant started generating electricity from 2073-08-09BS. The generation licence will expire in 2104-11-02 BS, after which the plant will be handed over to the government. The power station is connected to the national grid and the electricity is sold to Nepal Electricity Authority.

== See also ==
- List of power stations in Nepal
