= Padam Khola Small Hydropower Station =

- Location within Nepal
- Official name: Padam Khola Small Hydropower Station
- Country: Nepal
- Location: Dailekh District
- Coordinates: 28°54′02″N 81°51′19″E
- Purpose: Power
- Status: Operational
- Owner: Dolti Power Company P. Ltd

Dam and spillways
- Type of dam: Gravity
- Impounds: Padam River

Power Station
- Commission date: 2076-09-08 BS
- Type: Run-of-the-river
- Hydraulic head: 243.4 m (799 ft)
- Installed capacity: 4.8 MW
- Annual generation: 2x 2.37 MW,2 Jet Pelton

Padam Khola Small Hydropower Station (Nepali: पदम खोला सानो जलविद्युत आयोजना) is a run-of-river hydro-electric plant located in Dailekh District of Nepal. The flow from Padam River is used to generate 4.8 MW electricity. The design flow is 2.27 m^{3}/s and design head is 243.4 m.

The plant is owned and developed by Dolti Power Company P. Ltd, an IPP of Nepal. The plant started generating electricity from 2018 (2076-09-08BS) The generation licence will expire in 2053 (2109-06-28 BS) after which the plant will be handed over to the government. The power station is connected to the national grid and the electricity is sold to Nepal Electricity Authority.

== See also ==
- List of power stations in Nepal
