= Thoppal Khola Hydropower Station =

- Location within Nepal
- Official name: Thoppal Khola Hydropower Project
- Country: Nepal
- Coordinates: 27°51′00″N 84°50′30″E
- Purpose: Power
- Status: Operational
- Owner: Thoppal Khola Hydropower Company Pvt. Ltd

Dam and spillways
- Type of dam: Gravity
- Impounds: Thoppal River

Power Station
- Commission date: 2064-04-24 BS
- Type: Run-of-the-river
- Installed capacity: 1.65 MW

Thoppal Khola Hydropower Station (Nepali: थोप्पल खोला जलविद्युत आयोजना) is a run-of-river hydro-electric plant located in Dhading District of Nepal. The flow from Thoppal River is used to generate 1.65 MW electricity. The plant is owned and developed by Thoppal Khola Hydropower Company Pvt. Ltd, an IPP of Nepal. The plant started generating electricity from 2064-04-24 BS. The generation licence will expire in 2098-03-24 BS, after which the plant will be handed over to the government. The power station is connected to the national grid and the electricity is sold to Nepal Electricity Authority.

== See also ==
- List of power stations in Nepal
