= Indrawati III Hydropower Station =

- Location within Nepal
- Official name: Indrawati III Hydropower Project
- Country: Nepal
- Coordinates: 27°51′38″N 85°35′24″E
- Purpose: Power
- Status: Operational
- Owner: National Hydropower Company Limited

Dam and spillways
- Type of dam: Gravity
- Impounds: Indrawati River

Power Station
- Commission date: 2059-06-21 BS
- Type: Run-of-the-river
- Hydraulic head: 65 m (213 ft)
- Installed capacity: 7.5 MW
- Annual generation: 50 GWh

Indrawati III Hydropower Station (Nepali: इन्द्रावती ३ जलविद्युत आयोजना) is a run-of-river hydro-electric plant located in Sindhupalchok District of Nepal. The flow from Indrawati River, a tributary of Sunkoshi River, is used to generate 7.5 MW electricity with annual energy of 50 GWh. The design flow is 14 m^{3}/s and design gross head is 65 m. The plant is owned and developed by National Hydropower Company Limited, an IPP of Nepal. The plant started generating electricity since 2059-06-21 BS. The generation licence will expire in 2104-09-29 BS, after which the plant will be handed over to the government. The power station is connected to the national grid and the electricity is sold to Nepal Electricity Authority.

== See also ==
- List of power stations in Nepal
