= Arun III =

Hydro electric project in Nepal

- Location within Nepal
- Country: Nepal
- Coordinates: 27.510°N 87.193°E
- Purpose: Power
- Construction began: 2018
- Opening date: 2025

Dam and spillways
- Impounds: Arun River

Power Station
- Operator: SJVN
- Installed capacity: 900 MW

Arun III is a hydro-electric project under construction on the Arun River in Sankhuwasabha District of Koshi Province, Nepal. The project is of 900 megawatts capacity and will be one of the largest hydropower plant in South Asia. It is constructed by SJVN Arun III Power Development Company Private Limited, a wholly owned subsidiary of SJVN Ltd.

The estimated cost is US$1.6 billion including $156 million to develop the transmission line. It will generate about 4,018.87 million units of electricity annually. In February 2020, financial closure was done by the governments of India and Nepal. The project is constructed on a build-own-operate and transfer (BOOT) basis. SJVN will operate the plant for 30 years and then transfer the ownership to the Nepal government. During 30 years of operation, 21.9% of power will be provided to Nepal free of cost. The project's construction is expected to generate 3,000 jobs in Nepal and India.

== Project details ==
The project consists of a 70m high, 466m wide concrete gravity dam across the Arun River which will be able to store 13.94 million cubic meters of water. The dam will have six (now only five) sluice gates. There will be four underground desilting basins (they have since been removed from the proposal) having a length of 420m, a width of 16m and a height of 24m each. A 9.5m diameter tunnel having length of 11.74 km followed by 9.5m diameter two steel-lined pressure shafts and four penstocks will convey the flow to the powerhouse. The tailrace tunnel is 192m long and has a diameter of 10m. Four vertical Francis turbine units of 225MW each will be housed in an underground powerhouse. The gross head is 308m and the design net head is 286.21m. The power evacuation will be done via a 300 km-long, 400kV transmission line to India. It will be routed from Diding to Dhalkebar, Nepal, and finally to Muzaffarpur, India.

The civil contractor is Jaiprakash Associates. The hydro-mechanical contractor is Om Metals. The electro-mechanical contractor is BHEL. Total Management Services will monitor the environmental aspects. 269 families will be affected by the project construction, and they will be compensated by being provided with 30 units of electricity each free of cost every month.

== History ==
The project was formed by Nepal Government in 1992. However, NGOs, environmental activists and individuals worried against rampant privatization affecting the culture and natural beauty of the Arun valley expressed concerns. There were also fears that this project was inappropriately large and would lead to further increases in the price of electricity. There was also a debate for the road to the project area concerning deforestation and habitat fragmentation. In 1995, the World Bank decided to withdraw their support, effectively cancelling the project.

In November 2014, the project resurfaced and a Project Development Agreement was signed. The surplus power from the project will be exported to India from Dhalkebar, Nepal to Muzaffarpur, Bihar. In 2017, the cabinet of India approved the project for construction.

== See also ==
- List of power stations in Nepal
