= Upper Madi Hydropower Station =

- Location within Nepal
- Official name: Upper Madi Hydropower Project
- Country: Nepal
- Location: Kaski District
- Coordinates: 28°15′37″N 84°06′30″E
- Purpose: Power
- Status: Operational
- Owner: Madi Power Pvt Ltd.

Dam and spillways
- Type of dam: Gravity
- Impounds: Madi River

Power Station
- Commission date: 2073-09-25 BS
- Type: Run-of-the-river
- Installed capacity: 25 MW

Upper Madi Hydropower Station (Nepali: माथिल्लो मादी जलविद्युत आयोजना) is a run-of-river hydro-electric plant located in Kaski District of Nepal. The flow from Madi River is used to generate 25 MW electricity. The plant is owned and developed by Madi Power Pvt Ltd., an IPP of Nepal. The plant started generating electricity from 2073-09-25 BS. The generation licence will expire in 2102-01-26 BS, after which the plant will be handed over to the government. The power station is connected to the national grid and the electricity is sold to Nepal Electricity Authority.

== See also ==
- List of power stations in Nepal
