= Sundarijal Small Hydropower Station =

Power station in Kathmandu

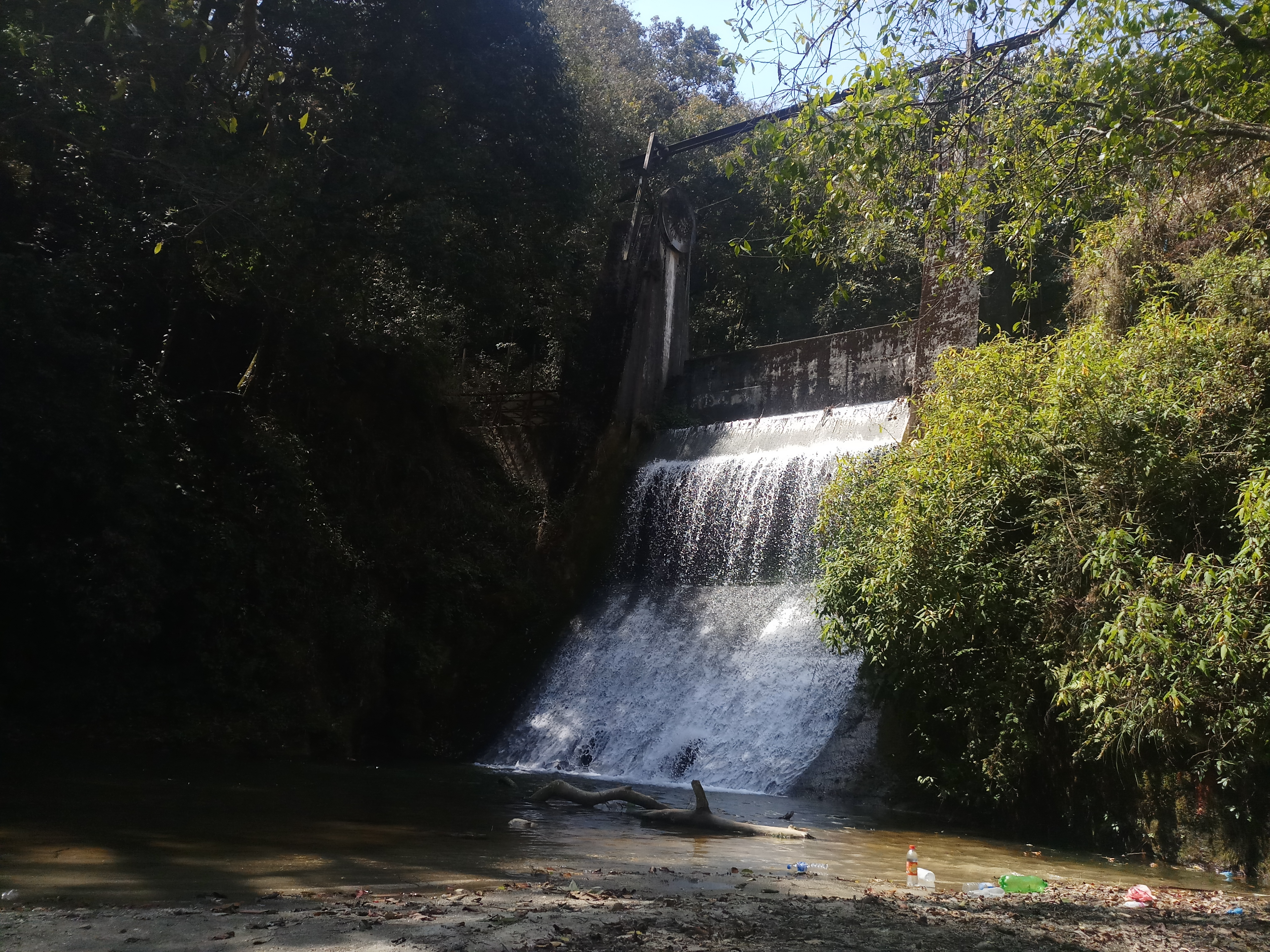
- Official name: Sundarijal Small Hydropower Station
- Country: Nepal
- Location: Kathmandu District
- Purpose: Power
- Status: Operational
- Owner: NEA

Dam and spillways
- Type of dam: Gravity
- Impounds: Sundarijal River

Power Station
- Commission date: 1991 BS
- Type: Run-of-the-river
- Installed capacity: 640 kW

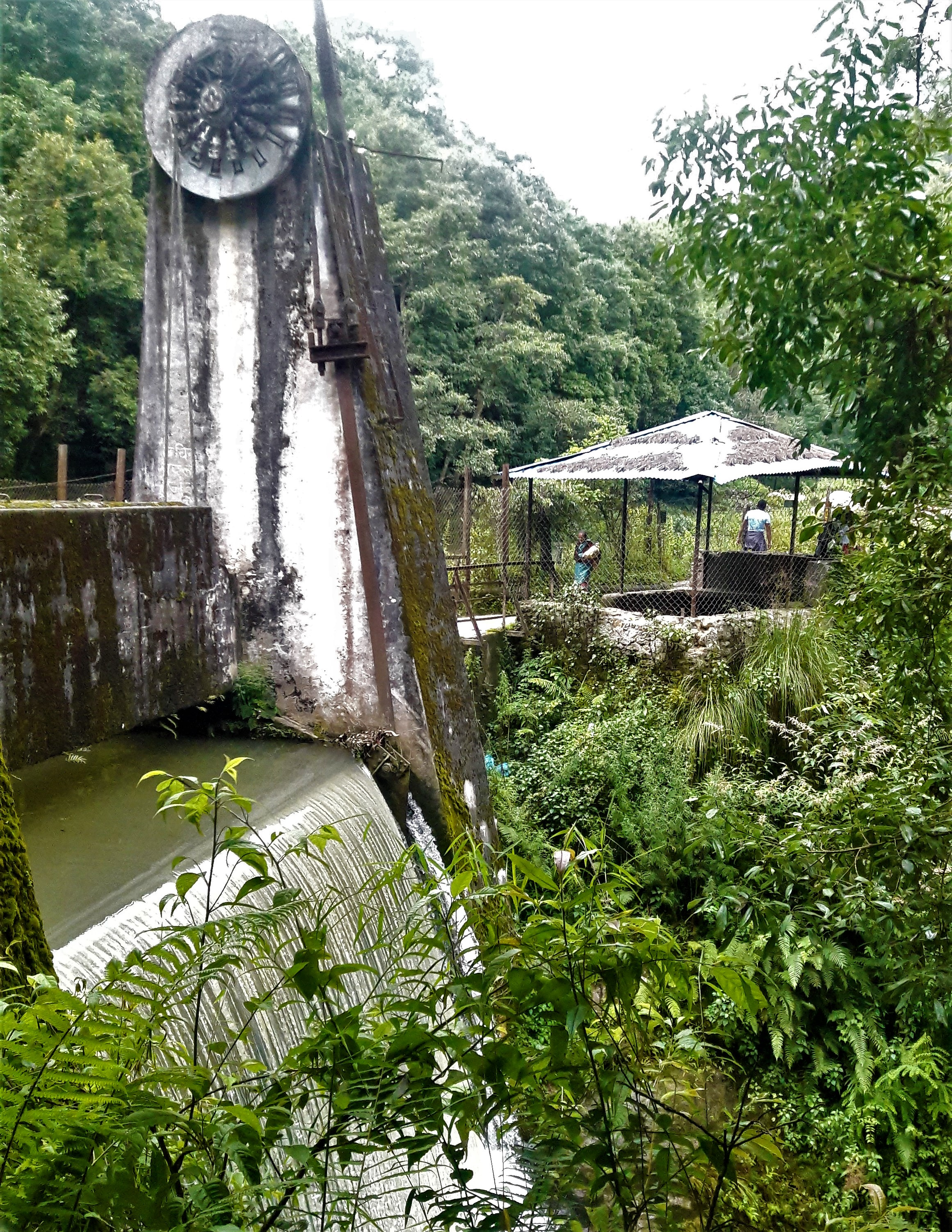
Reservoir of power station

Sundarijal Small Hydropower Station (Nepali: सुन्दरिजल सानो जलविद्युत आयोजना) is a run-of-river hydro-electric plant located in Kathmandu District of Nepal. The flow from Sundarijal River is used to generate 640 kW electricity and annual energy generation is 4.77 GWh. Constructed in 1939, it is the second hydropower plant of Nepal constructed after Pharping Hydropower Station.

== History ==
The construction of plant started in 1979 B.S. (1934) and the production started from 1991 B.S. It was constructed with a grant from British government.

== Features ==
Currently, the plant houses two horizontal Pelton turbines each with 320 kW. The outgoing water is used for drinking water supply system and irrigation of Kathmandu. The plant is run by local community. The project consists of about 300 meter cemented canal from Nagmait river and about 1600 meter long canal from Syalmati river. The water is collected at a collection Pond near the Bagmati river located at Sundarijal. The penstock pipe is 45 centimeter in diameter and is 1386 meter long. The net head of the plant is 216.0 meter while the design flow is 23.3 ft3/s. There are two horizontal axis Pelton turbines running at 900 rpm.

== Accidents ==
Many fatal accidents have occurred at the reservoir. Each year death of swimmers is reported.

== See also ==
- List of power stations in Nepal
