= Chatara Hydropower Station =

- Official name: Chatara Hydropower Station
- Country: Nepal
- Location: Sunsari District
- Purpose: Power
- Status: Operational
- Owner: Nepal Electricity Authority

Dam and spillways
- Type of dam: Gravity

Power Station
- Commission date: 2074-12-26 BS
- Type: Run-of-the-river
- Installed capacity: 3.2 MW
- Annual generation: Kaplan Type

Chatara Hydropower Station(नेपालीः चतरा जलविद्युत आयोजना) is a canal drop type power station having an installed capacity of 3.2 MW. The power station was commissioned in the year 1996 AD and was handed over to Nepal Electricity Authority by Sunsari Morang Irrigation Project on 29 March 1999. This power station is supplying electricity to local area through Chatara feeder.

The plant was repaired in 2073BS by replacing the turbines.

== See also ==
- List of power stations in Nepal
