= Piluwa Khola Hydropower Station =

Hydro-electric plant in Sankhuwasabha District of Nepal

Piluwa Khola Hydropower Project
- Location within Nepal
- Official name: Piluwa Khola Hydropower Project
- Country: Nepal
- Coordinates: 27°15′45″N 87°19′35″E
- Purpose: Power
- Status: Operational
- Owner: Arun Valley Hydropower Development Company Pvt. Ltd.

Dam and spillways
- Type of dam: Gravity
- Impounds: Piluwa River

Piluwa Khola Hydropower Station
- Commission date: 2060-06-01 BS
- Type: Run-of-the-river
- Hydraulic head: 112.5 m (369 ft)
- Turbines: 2 * 1721 Kw, Turgo Impulse Turbine
- Installed capacity: 3.0 MW

Piluwa Khola Hydropower Project (Nepali: पिलुवा खोला जलविद्युत आयोजना) is a run-of-river hydro-electric plant located in Sankhuwasabha District of Nepal. The flow from Piluwa River is used to generate 3.0 MW electricity. The design flow is 3.5 m^{3}/s and head is 112.5 m. The plant is owned and developed by Arun Valley Hydropower Development Company Pvt. Ltd. The plant started generating electricity since 2060-06-01 B.S. The generation licence will expire in 2097-04-32 BS, after which the plant will be handed over to the government.

The power station is connected to the national grid and it sells electricity to Nepal Electricity Authority.

== See also ==
- List of power stations in Nepal
