= Khudi Khola Hydropower Station =

Hydroelectric power station in Nepal

- Location within Nepal
- Official name: Khudi Khola Hydropower Project
- Country: Nepal
- Coordinates: 28°16′30″N 84°19′30″E
- Purpose: Power
- Status: Operational
- Owner: Khudi Hydropower Ltd.

Dam and spillways
- Type of dam: Gravity
- Impounds: Khudi River

Power Station
- Commission date: 2063-09-15 BS
- Type: Run-of-the-river
- Installed capacity: 4 MW

Khudi Khola Hydropower Station (Nepali: खुदी खोला जलविद्युत आयोजना) is a run-of-river hydro-electric plant located in Simpani, Lamjung District of Nepal. The flow from Khudi River, a tributary of Marshyangdi River, is used to generate 4 MW electricity. The plant is owned and developed by Khudi Hydropower Ltd., an IPP of Nepal. The plant started generating electricity from 2063-09-15 BS. The generation licence will expire in 2096-11-12 BS, after which the plant will be handed over to the government. The power station is connected to the national grid and the electricity is sold to Nepal Electricity Authority.

Butwal Power Company has 60% stake in Khudi Hydropower Ltd. and other investors are SCP Hydro International inc. (SCPHI) and Lamjung Electricity Development Company Limited (LEDCO) with 25% and 15% stake respectively.

== See also ==
- List of power stations in Nepal
