= Gandak Hydropower Station =

Hydro-electric power station in Nepal

- Location within Nepal
- Official name: Gandak Hydropower Station
- Country: Nepal
- Coordinates: 27.4268°N 83.789°E
- Purpose: Power/Irrigation
- Status: Operational
- Owner: Nepal Electricity Authority

Dam and spillways
- Type of dam: Gravity
- Impounds: Narayani River

Gandak Hydropower Station
- Coordinates: 27.4268°N 83.789°E
- Commission date: 2035-12-19 BS
- Type: Canal
- Hydraulic head: 6.09 m (20.0 ft)
- Turbines: 3 x 5MW Kaplan-type turbines, horizontal axis
- Installed capacity: 15 MW
- Annual generation: 106.38 GWh

Gandak Hydro Power Station is a hydro-electric plant located in Pratappur, Nawalparasi district of Nepal. The flow from Narayani River is used to generate 15 MW electricity and annual energy is 106.38 GWh. The plant is a part of irrigation facility in the Gandak River constructed as a part of India-Nepal Gandak River Agreement. A barrage in the Narayani river diverts the flow to India and Nepal for irrigation viz. the eastern canal (24.1 m^{3}/s) and western canal (8.5 m^{3}/s). This power station is located on the western canal approximately 18 km downstream of barrage at Surajpura, Nepal.

== See also ==
- List of power stations in Nepal
