= Iwa Khola Hydropower Project =

- Location within Nepal
- Official name: Iwa Khola Hydropower Project
- Country: Nepal
- Coordinates: 27°16′30″N 87°50′05″E
- Purpose: Power
- Status: Operational
- Owner: Rairang Hydropower Development Company Limited

Dam and spillways
- Type of dam: Gravity
- Impounds: Iwa River

Iwa Khola Hydropower Station
- Coordinates: 27.7390°N 83.4620°E
- Commission date: 2072-03-28 BS
- Type: Run-of-the-river
- Installed capacity: 9.90 MW

Iwa Khola Hydropower Project (Nepali: ईवा खोला जलविद्युत आयोजना) is a run-of-river hydro-electric plant located in Sawalakhu, Taplejung District of Nepal. The flow from Iwa River is used to generate 9.90 MW electricity. The plant is owned and developed by Rairang Hydropower Development Company Limited. The plant started generating electricity since 2076-06-20 B.S. The generation licence will expire in 2107-03-27 BS, after which the plant will be handed over to the government.

The power station is connected to the national grid and it sells electricity to Nepal Electricity Authority.

== Finance ==
The project was financed by a consortium of banks led by the Bank of Kathmandu. The consortium partners are Machhapuchchhre Bank, Nepal Credit and Commerce Bank, Siddhartha Bank and Citizen Bank. The total project cost is estimated at NPR 1.60 billion. Out of the total project cost, 65% is financed by the consortium.

Rairang Hydropower Development Company Limited is a subsidiary company of Ridi hydropower development company limited with 268 shareholders.

== See also ==
List of power stations in Nepal
