= Sunkoshi Hydropower Station =

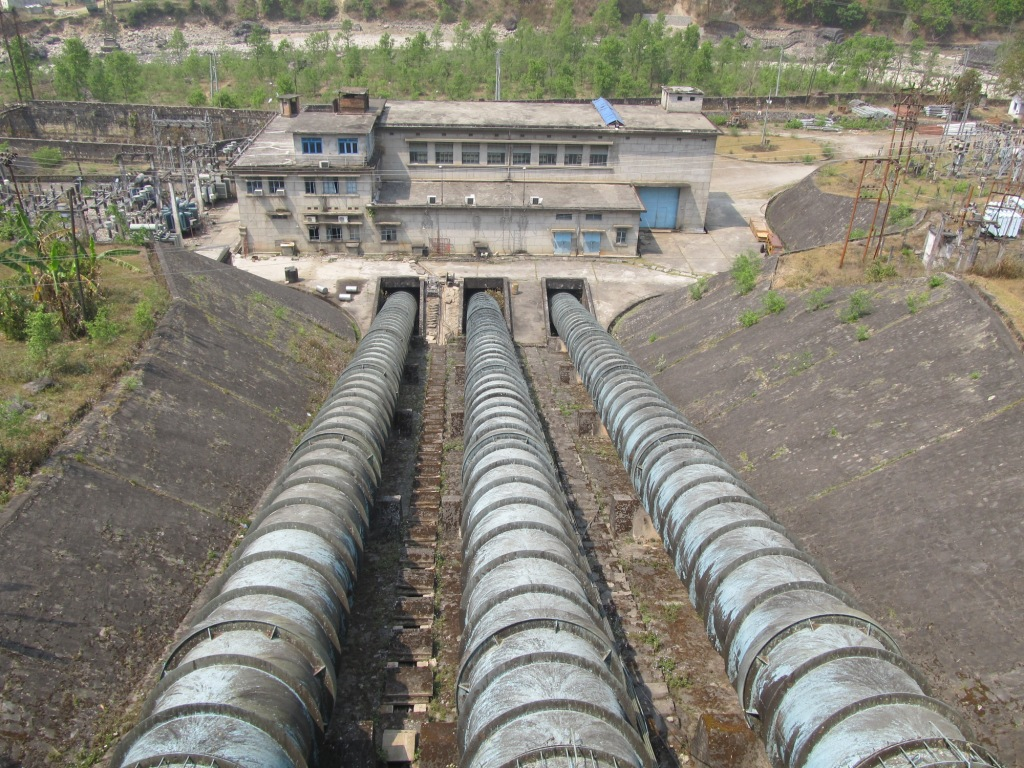

- Location within Nepal
- Official name: Sunkoshi Hydropower Station
- Country: Nepal
- Coordinates: 27.7694°N 85.8499°E
- Purpose: Power
- Status: Operational
- Owner: Nepal Electricity Authority

Dam and spillways
- Type of dam: Gravity
- Impounds: Sunkoshi River

Power Station
- Commission date: 2051-12-06 BS
- Type: Run-of-the-river
- Installed capacity: 10.05 MW

Sunkoshi Hydropower Station (Nepali: सुनकोशी जलविद्युत आयोजना) is a run-of-river hydro-electric plant located in Sindhupalchok District of Nepal. The flow from Sunkoshi River is used to generate 10.05 MW electricity. The plant is owned and developed by Government owned company, the Nepal Electricity Authority. The plant started generating electricity since 1972 ( 2028 BS).

The power station is connected to the national grid.

The project was built as a gift from China to Nepal.

== Events ==
- In 2014 Sunkoshi blockage, the intake of the project was damaged.

== Gallery ==
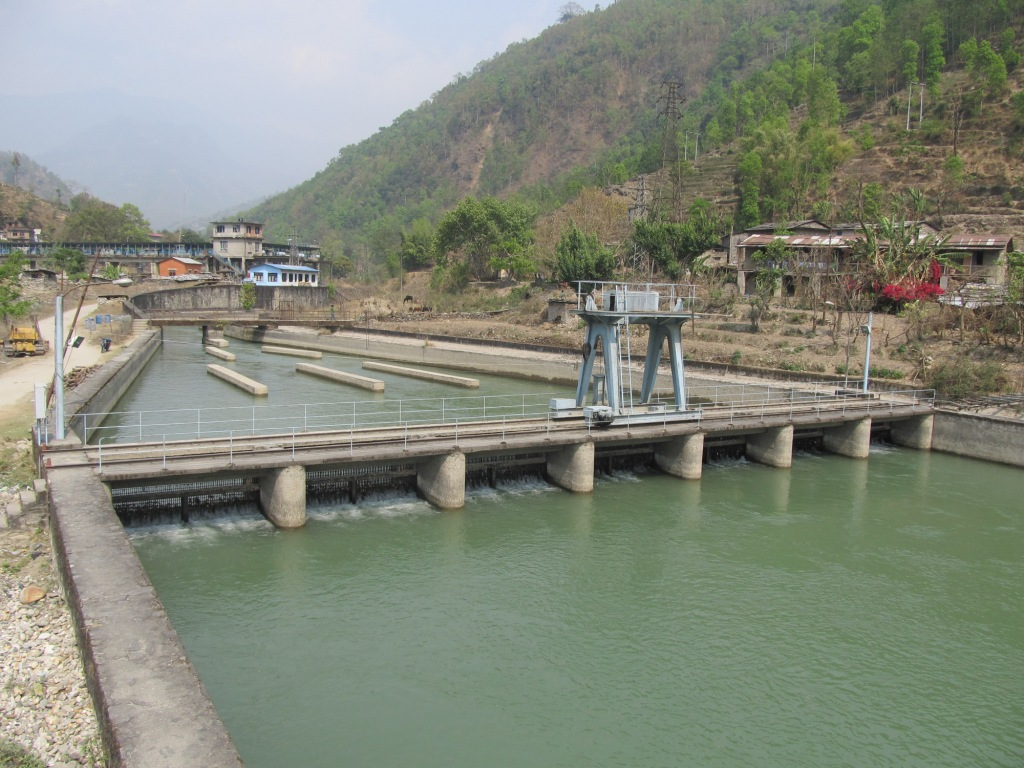
Settling basin

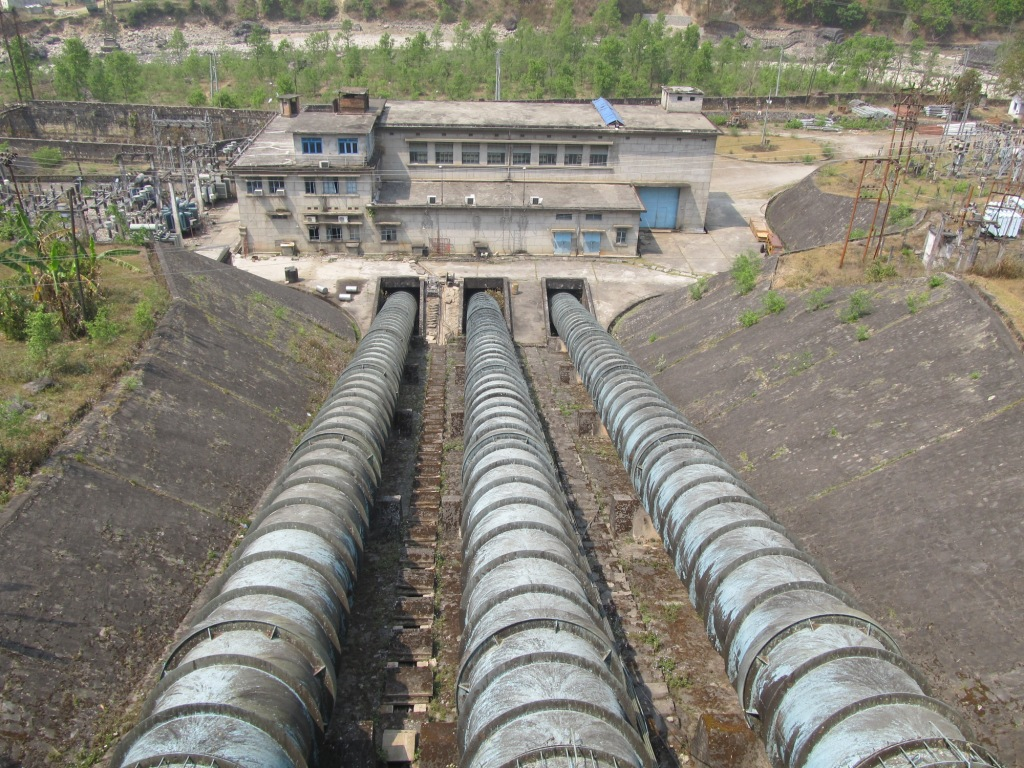
Penstock pipes

== See also ==
- List of power stations in Nepal
