= Chameliya Khola Hydropower Station =

Chameliya Khola Hydropower Project
- Location within Nepal
- Official name: चमेलिया खोला जलविद्युत आयोजना
- Country: Nepal
- Location: Darchula district
- Coordinates: 29°41′00″N 80°38′00″E
- Purpose: Power
- Status: Operational
- Owner: Nepal Electricity Authority

Dam and spillways
- Type of dam: Gravity
- Impounds: Chamelia River

Chamelia Khola Hydropower Station
- Commission date: 2074-10-27 B.S.
- Type: Run-of-the-river
- Installed capacity: 30 MW

Chameliya Khola Hydropower Station (चमेलिया खोला जलविद्युत आयोजना) is a run-of-river hydro-electric plant located in Sikhar, Darchula District of Nepal. The flow from the Chameliya River is used to generate 30 MW electricity. The plant is owned and operated by Nepal Electricity Authority. The plant started generating electricity from 2074-10-27 BS. The power station is connected to the national grid.

== Finance ==
The project is jointly funded by Government of Nepal and Republic of Korea through Economic Development Corporation Fund. It took 10 years to construct the project.

== See also ==
- List of power stations in Nepal
- Chameliya River
