= Khimti I Hydropower Plant =

- Location within Nepal
- Official name: Khimti I Hydropower Plant
- Country: Nepal
- Location: Dolakha district
- Coordinates: 27°28′28″N 86°06′04″E
- Purpose: Power
- Status: Operational
- Owner: Himal Power Limited

Dam and spillways
- Type of dam: Gravity
- Impounds: Khimti Khola

Power Station
- Type: Run-of-the-river
- Hydraulic head: 221.5 m (727 ft)
- Turbines: 5x12Pelton-type
- Installed capacity: 60 MW

Khimti I Hydropower Plant is a run-of-the-river hydroelectric power station with an installed capacity of 60 MW. The flow is 11.65 m3/s and the head is 660m. This power station is underground located at Dolakha district of Nepal. The plant became fully operational on 2074-01-10 BS.

The plant is operated by Himal Power Limited.
