= Chaku Khola Hydropower Station =

Hydroelectric power station in Sindhupalchok, Nepal

- Location within Nepal
- Country: Nepal
- Location: Sindhupalchok District
- Coordinates: 27°52′20″N 85°56′00″E
- Purpose: Power
- Status: Operational
- Owner: Alliance Power Nepal

Dam and spillways
- Type of dam: Gravity
- Impounds: Chaku River

Power Station
- Commission date: 2062-03-01 BS
- Type: Run-of-the-river
- Installed capacity: 3 MW

Chaku Khola Hydropower Station is a run-of-the-river hydroelectric power station with an installed capacity of 3 MW. The power station is located in Sindhupalchok District, Nepal. The plant is operated by Alliance Power Nepal, an IPP.

== Accidents ==
- 2015 October: The project was severely damaged due to aftershock of the Gorkha Earthquake.
- 2019 July: Two staffs were killed due to flood in the river.

== See also ==
- Nepal Electricity Authority
- List of power stations in Nepal
