= Hewa Khola-A Hydroelectric Project =

Hewa Khola A Hydroelectric Project
- Location within Nepal
- Official name: Hewa Khola A Hydroelectric Project
- Country: Nepal
- Location: Panchthar district
- Coordinates: 27°11′8″N 87°49′40″E
- Purpose: Power
- Status: Operational
- Owner: Panchthar Power Company Pvt. Ltd.

Dam and spillways
- Type of dam: Gravity
- Impounds: Hewa Khola

Power Station
- Type: Run-of-the-river
- Hydraulic head: 221.5 m (727 ft)
- Turbines: 2 Francis-type
- Installed capacity: 14.90 MW

Hewa Khola-A Hydroelectric Project is a run-of-the-river hydroelectric power station with an installed capacity of 14.90 MW. This power station is located at Panchthar district of Nepal. The plant became fully operational on 2074-01-10 BS.

The plant is operated by Panchthar Power Company Pvt. Ltd., a private company of Nepal.
