= 2014 Sunkoshi blockage =

Landslide disaster in Nepal

Sunkoshi blockage
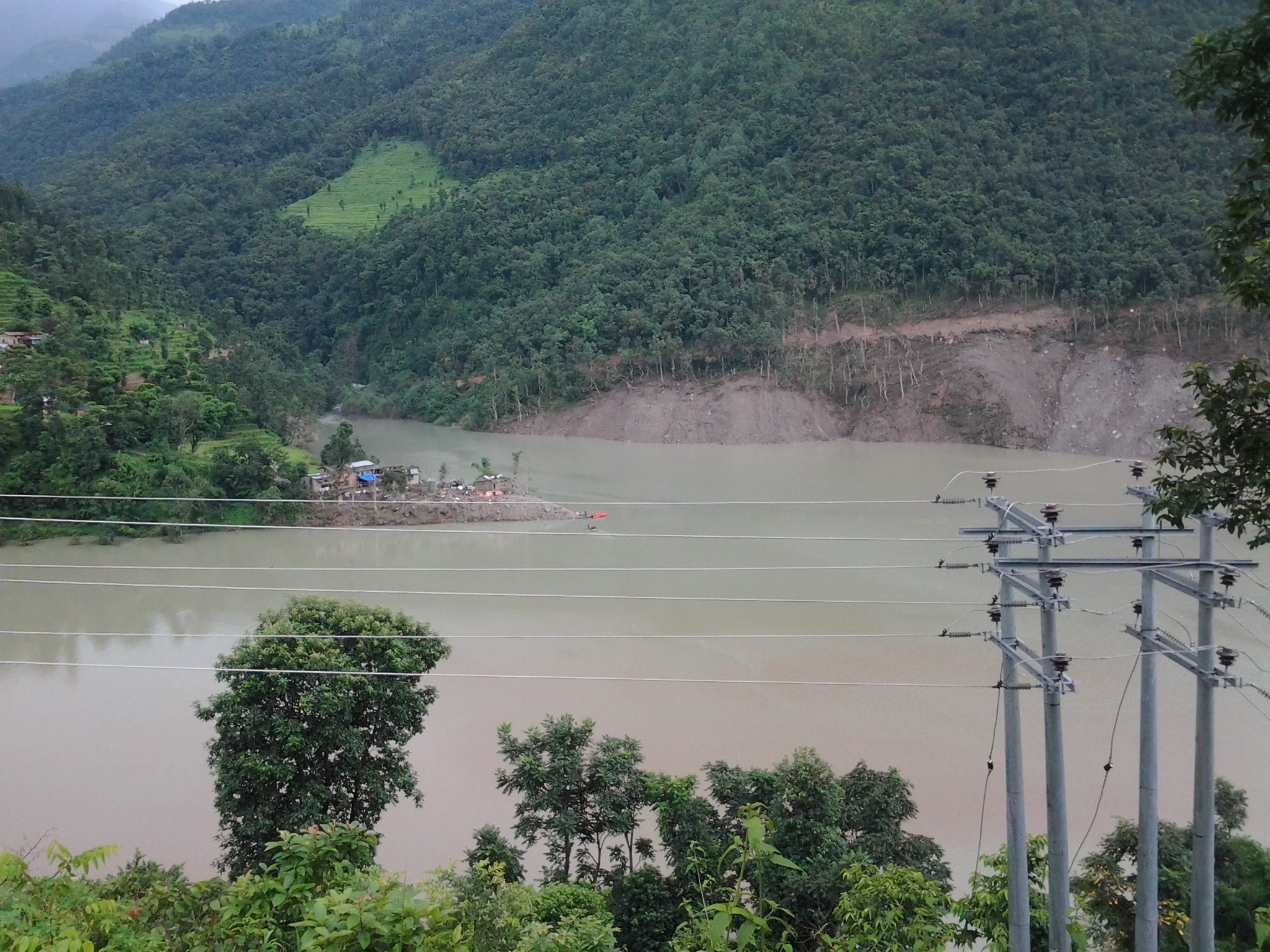

Details
- Country: Nepal
- Incident type: Flood
- Cause: Blockage

Statistics
- Deaths: 156

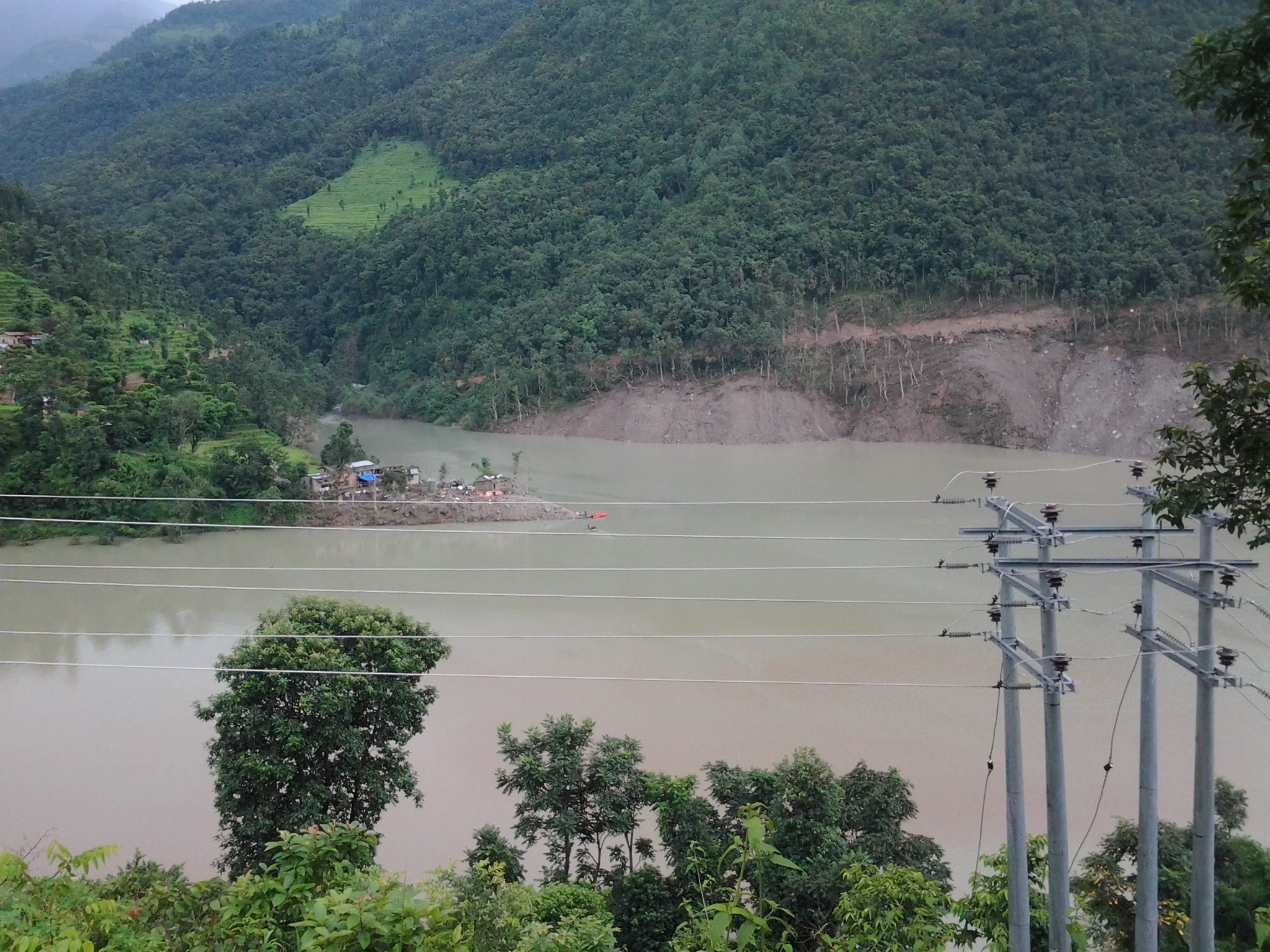
Lake formed by Sunkoshi blockage

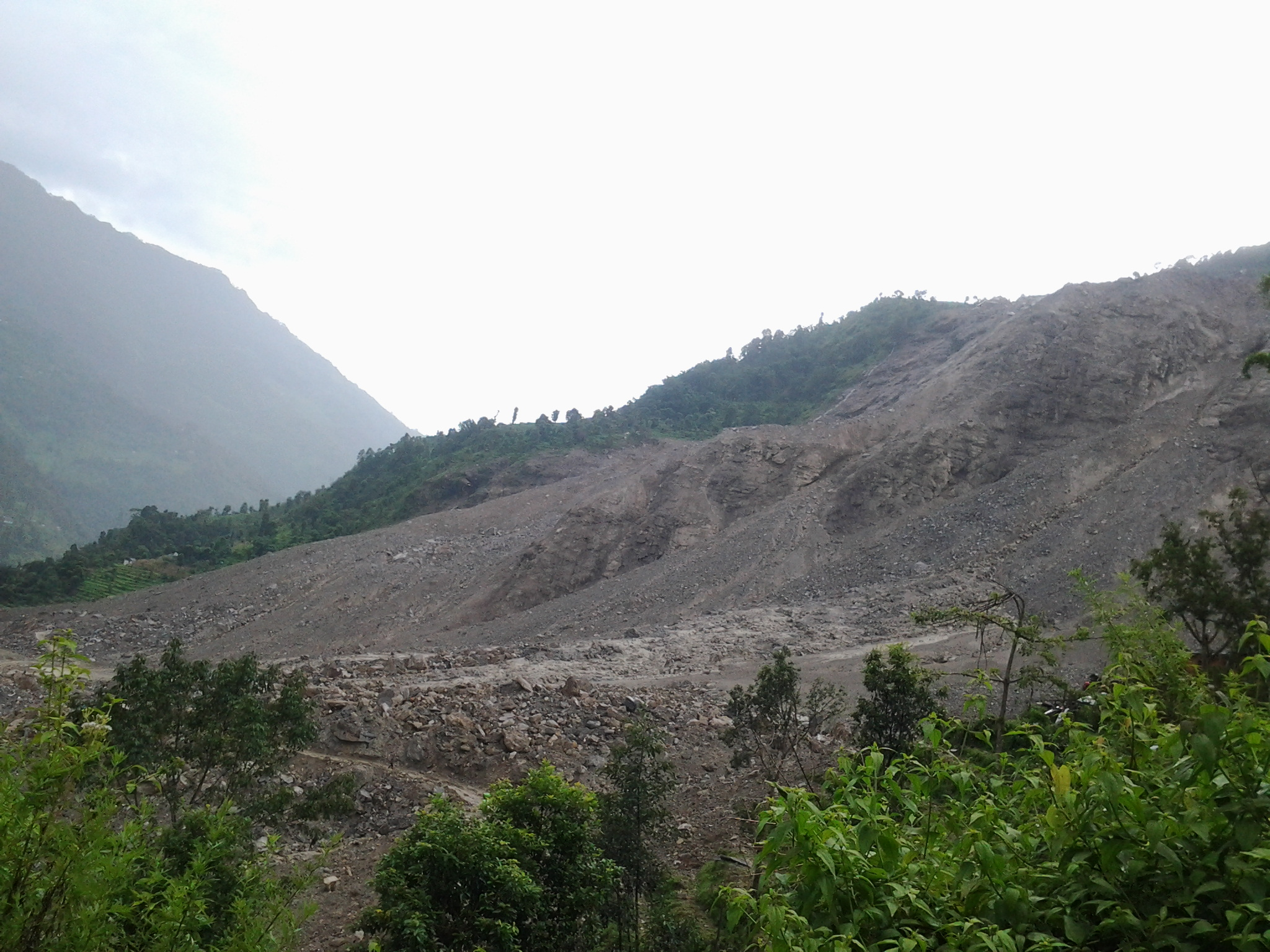
Jure area after landslide

On 2 August 2014, due to heavy rainfall, a landslide occurred at the Sunkoshi river, killing 156 people and blocking the river to form an artificial lake in Sindhupalchok District, Nepal. Araniko Highway, the main (and only) artery of goods and people flow to China, was blocked by the landslide ripping out 5 km of highway, and causing huge traffic jam.

The landslide, which had a volume of 5.5 million cubic metres swept away 2 dozen houses.

This landslide had massive effects far beyond the local area, not evident from the pictures. The dammed river threatened to unleash a torrent of water upon hundreds of downstream villages that would have ravaged as far as Northern India. Despite the use of dynamite, it took the Nepali Army 45 days to dig a canal through the blockage to allow water in the lake to drain. The lake created was 47 meters deep and over 400 meters long. The hasty emergency draining through the lake canal itself caused damage to houses downstream and threatened to take out Lamusanghu Hydropower Dam.

== 2015 earthquakes ==
Following earthquakes in April and May 2015, concern was expressed that the dam might have become unstable leading to a risk of further flooding downstream of the blockage.
