= Independent Power Producers Association =

The Independent Power Producers Association, Nepal (IPPAN; स्वतन्त्र उर्जा उत्पादकहरुको संस्था, नेपाल) is an association of private developers and owners of power production companies in Nepal. It is a non-profit, non-government, autonomous organization and was established in 2001. Its main objective is to link the private sector and government organizations involved in hydropower generation. IPPAN is primarily a membership organization. The General Assembly comprises both institutional and individual members. The General Assembly elects the Board of Directors, which then formulates the plans and policies of the organization. As of 2020, there are 580 private hydropower projects that are in operation or under construction with a total capacity to generate 21,000 MW. The private sector has invested about NPR 600 billion in these projects.

== Objectives ==
The Independent Power Producers (IPPs) generate electricity and sell to the Nepal Electricity Authority (NEA) based on a contract called a Power Purchase Agreement (PPA). IPPAN helps to :

- Lobby for private sector friendly policies, regulations and their prompt and effective implementation.
- Disseminate information through media, seminar, conferences to political parties, government, officials, civil societies and the people.
- Build capacity of IPPs and related stakeholders.
- Develop linkages for regional co-operation in the power sector.
- Create an atmosphere of friendly cooperation between the government and private sector.

== Activities ==
- IPPAN organized the power summit in 2019 in Kathmandu on November 21–22 with the title "Powering the Asian Century".
- Himalayan Hydro Expo was organized on January 18–20, 2019 as a meeting of developers and suppliers

== See also ==
- Department of Electricity Development
- Nepal Electricity Authority
