= Koshi Province =

Province of Nepal

Koshi Province कोशी प्रदेश
- Province
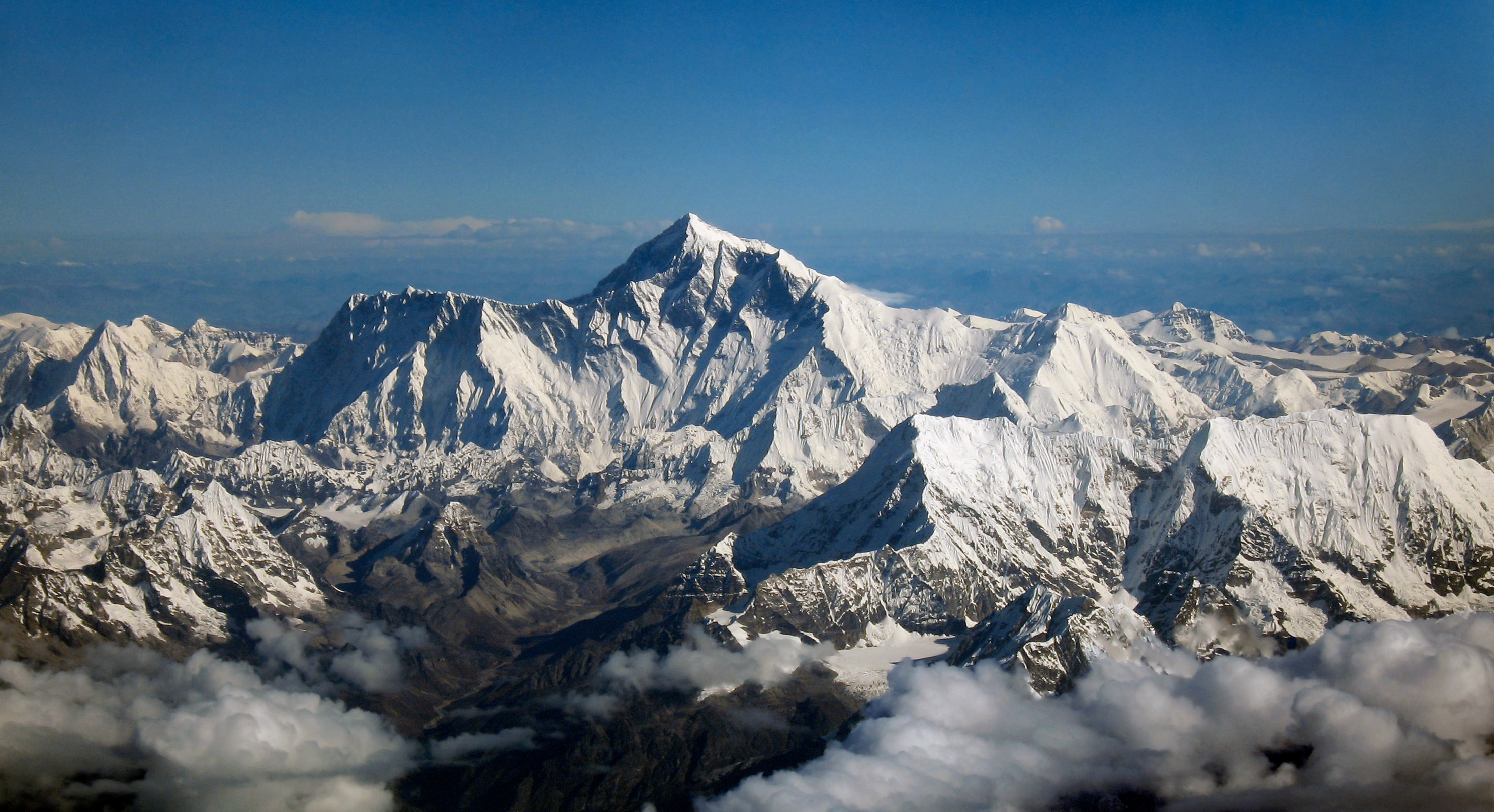
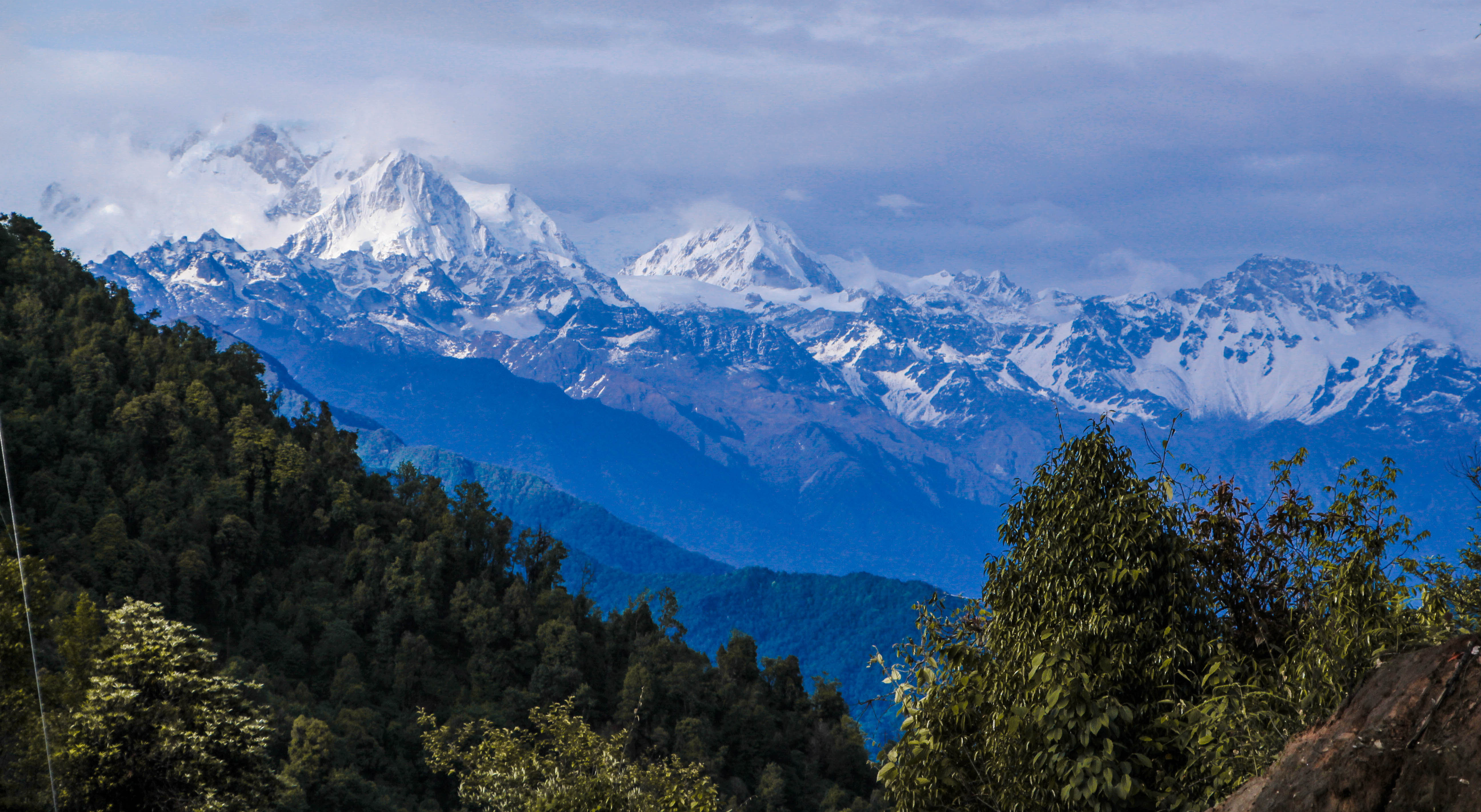
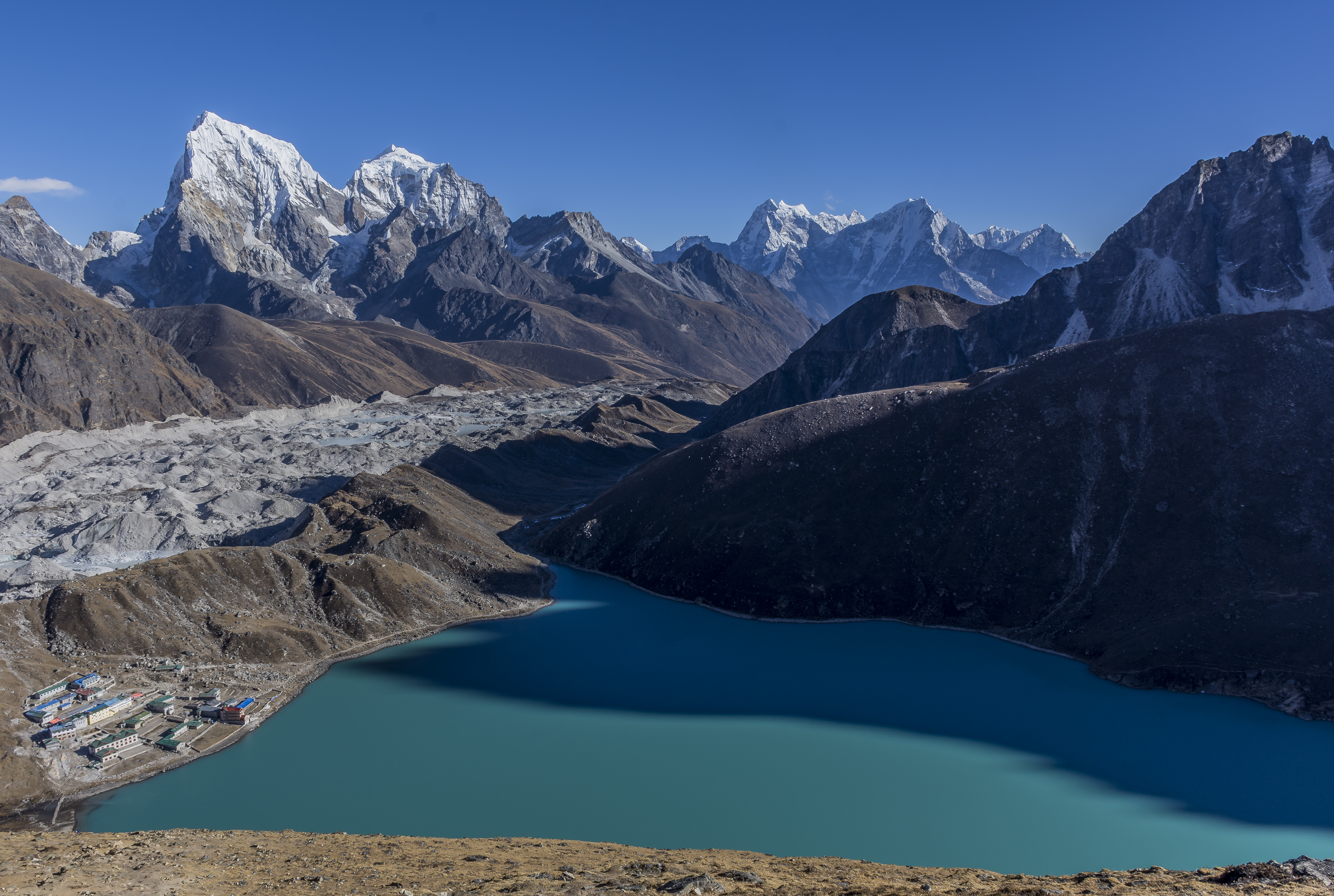
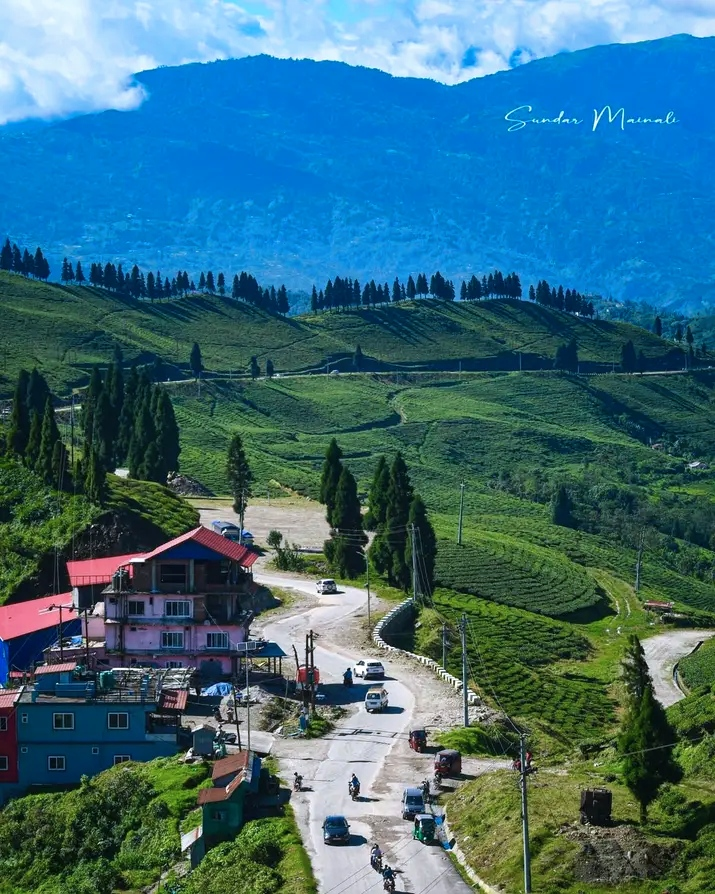
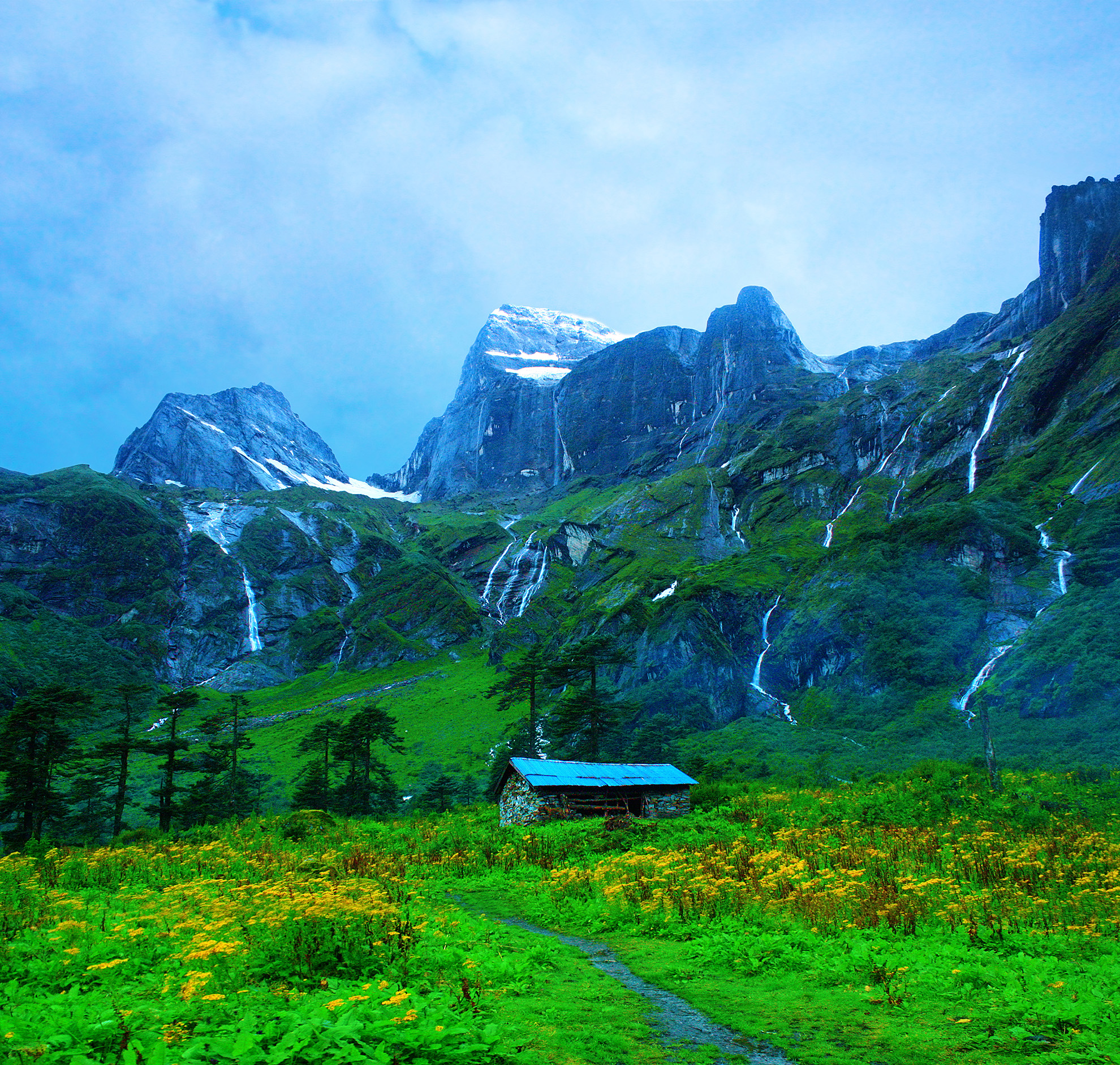
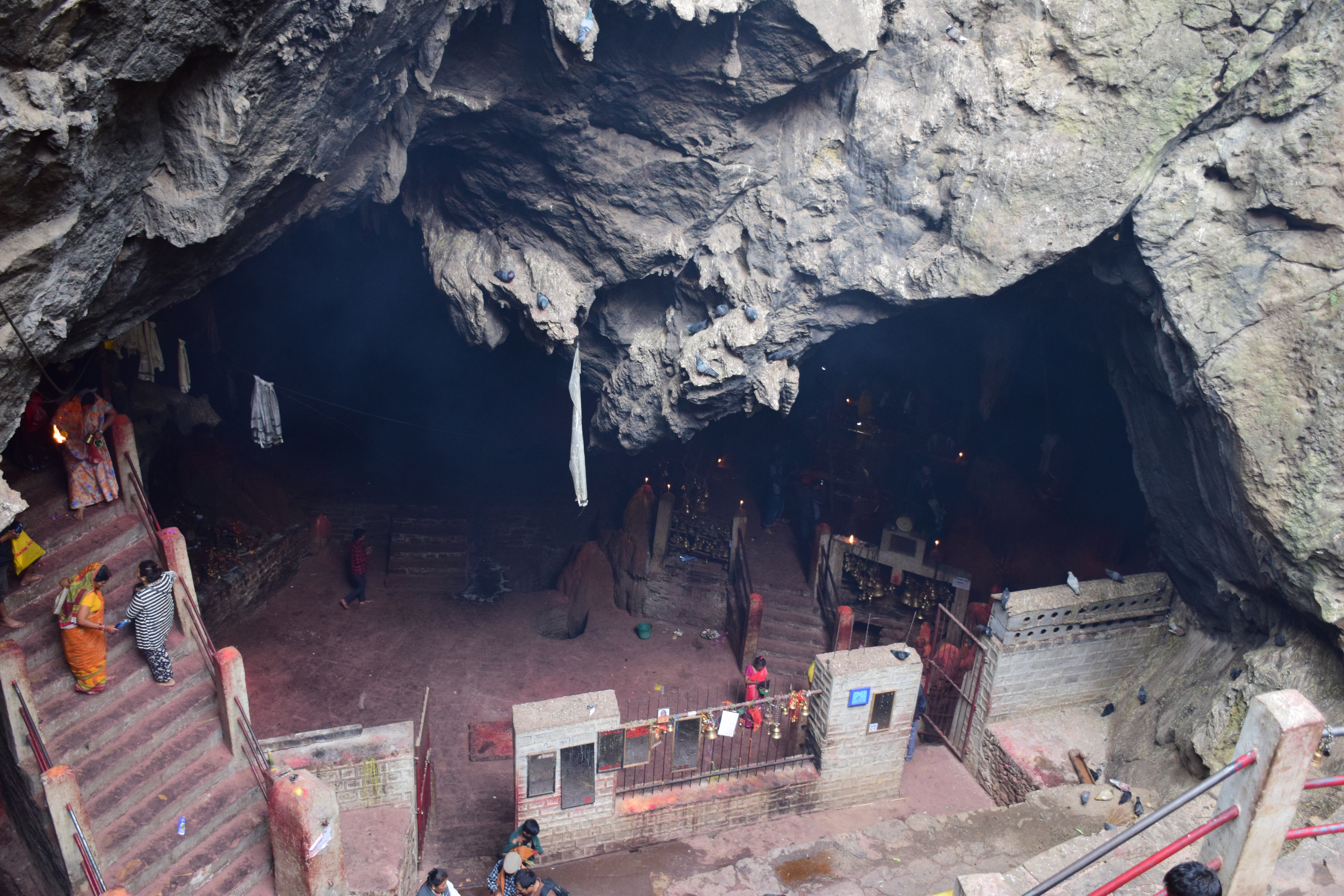
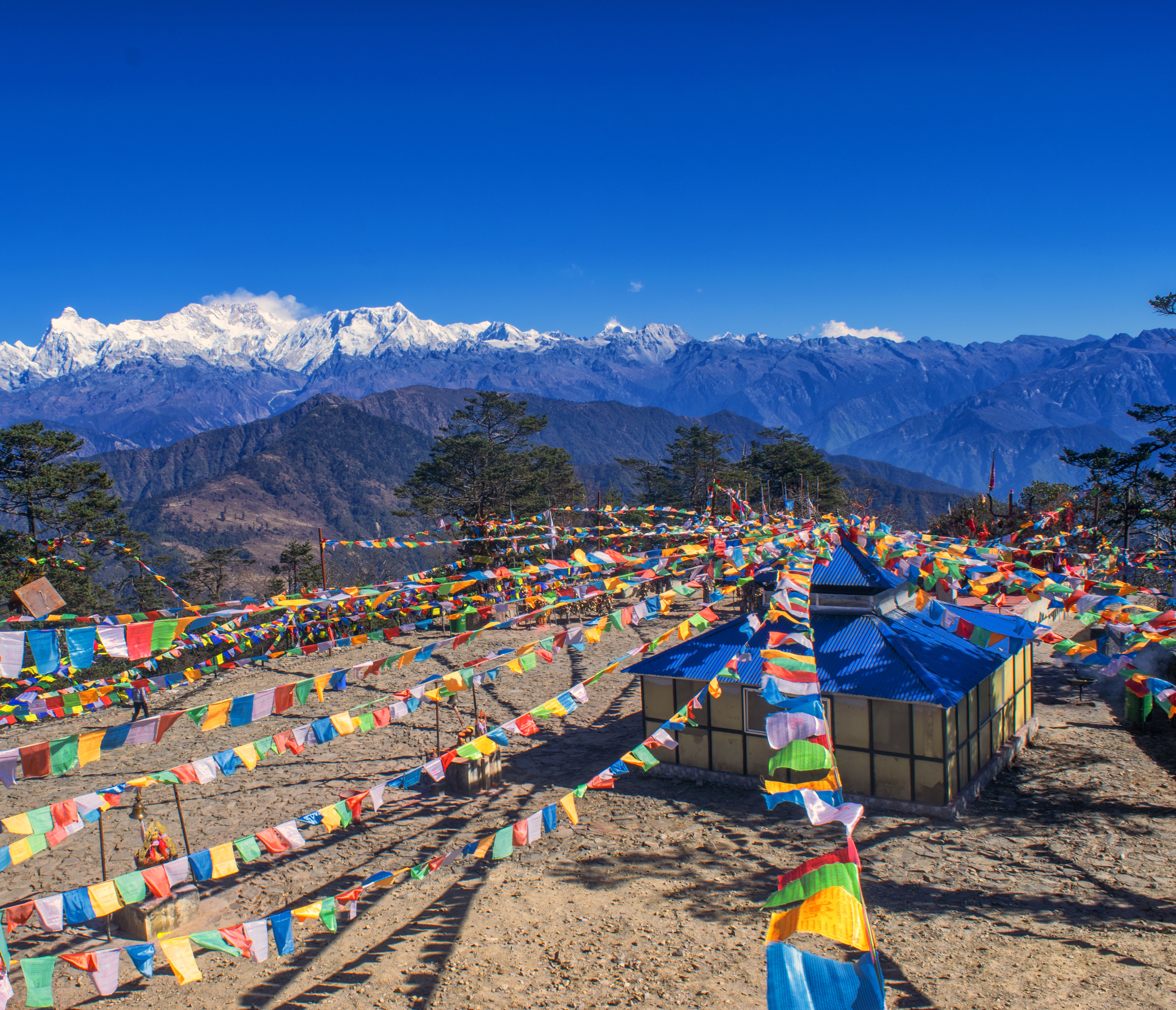
- From top left to right: Mount Everest, Kanchenjunga, Gokyo Lakes, Kanyam, Barun Valley, Halesi Mahadev Temple, Pathibhara Devi Temple

- Seal
- Etymology: Derived from Sanskrit word kauśika
- Location of Koshi Province in Nepal

- Koshi Province
- Interactive map of Koshi Province
- Coordinates (Biratnagar): 26°27′15″N 87°16′47″E
- Country: Nepal
- Formation: 20 September 2015
- Named as Koshi: 1 March 2023
- Named for: Koshi River
- Capital: Biratnagar
- Largest city: Biratnagar
- Districts: 14

Government
  - Type: Self-governing Province
  - Body: Government of Koshi Province
  - Governor: Parshuram Khapung Limbu (CPN UML)
  - Chief Minister: Hikmat Kumar Karki
  - High Court: Biratnagar High Court
  - Koshi Provincial Assembly: Unicameral (93 seats)
  - Parliamentary constituency: 28

Area
  - Total: 25,905 km^{2} (10,002 sq mi)
  - Rank: 2nd
- Highest elevation (Mount Everest): 8,848.86 m (29,031.7 ft)
- Lowest elevation (Kechana Kawal): 58 m (190 ft)

Population (2021)
  - Total: 4,961,412
  - Rank: 4th
  - Density: 192/km^{2} (500/sq mi)
  - Rank: 4th
  - Households: 1,191,556
- Demonym(s): Purbeli, Kosheli, Koshyali

Demographics
  - Religions: Hinduism 66.63%; Kiratism 17.14%; Buddhism 9.20%; Islam 3.59%; Prakriti 1.33%
  - Ethnic groups: 14.9% Chhetri; 11.5% Bahun; 10.2% Rai; 8.2% Limbu; 4.5% Tamang; 4.2% Tharu; 4.1% Muslims; 4.0% Magar; 3.6% Newar
  - Sex ratio: 91.48 ♂ /100 ♀ (2011)

Development Parameters
  - Poverty rate: 0.127
  - Literacy: 79.7%▲
  - Life expectancy: 69
  - HDI: 0.553▲ (medium)
- Time zone: UTC+5:45 (NST)
- Postal code: 57208
- Geocode: NP-ON
- ISO 3166 code: NP-P1
- Vehicle registration: KOSHI XX AB XXXX
- Other Official Languages: 13 Regional official languages; Including:Maithili,Limbu,Tharu, Tamang,Magar,Bantawa,Urdu, Rajbanshi,Rai,Newar,Chamling, Sherpa,and Santhali
- Website: koshi.gov.np

Koshi Province (Nepali: कोशी प्रदेश, romanized: Kōśī pradēśa) is one of the seven provinces of Nepal, established by the Constitution of Nepal on 20 September 2015. It covers an area of 25,905 km^{2} (10,002 sq mi), which is about 17.5% of the country's total area. With the industrial city of Biratnagar as its capital, the province includes the major towns of Birtamod, Sundar Haraincha, Damak, Dharan, Itahari, Triyuga Municipality, and Mechinagar. It further hosts a number of Himalayan peaks including Mount Everest, Kangchenjunga (the third highest peak on Earth), Lhotse (the fourth highest peak), Makalu (the fifth highest peak), Cho Oyu (the sixth highest peak), and Ama Dablam.

The river Koshi, the largest river of the nation, and the Koshi Tappu wildlife reserve form the province's western boundary. The province is bordered by the Tibet Autonomous Region of China to the north, the Indian states of Sikkim and West Bengal to the east and Bihar to the south, and Bagmati Province and Madhesh Province to the west. The province also hosts the Koshi highway, which is one of the three crucial Nepalese north-south corridors that are designed to connect India and China via land.

Under the First-past-the-post voting system issued by the Constituency Delimitation Commission, Nepal, the province hosts 28 parliamentary seats and 56 provincial assembly seats. According to the 2021 Nepal census, there are around five million people in the province, with a population density of 190 per square kilometre. Per the earlier 2011 Nepal census, the province had approximately 4.5 million people.

== Etymology ==
The province is named Koshi after the Koshi River, which is the largest river in the country. On 1 March 2023 the former temporary name of the province, Province No. 1, was changed to Koshi Province.

== History ==
=== Prehistory ===
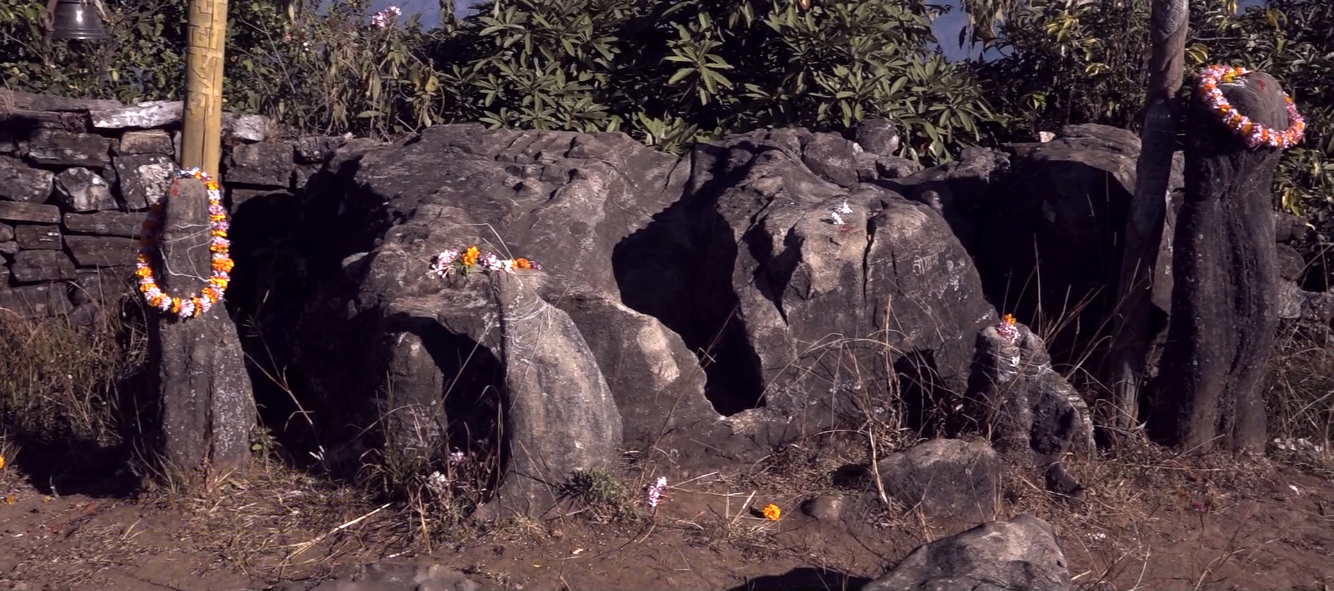
Tuwachung Jayajum historical site in Malathumki hill Halesi Tuwachung Municipality , Khotang

Eastern Nepal has a long history of human occupation. Archaeological research in the Patu and Ratua Khola areas has identified stone tools such as choppers, scrapers, flakes and edged tools, indicating prehistoric and early-Holocene activity. The Kosi River system, including the Arun, Tamur, Sunkoshi and Dudh Koshi formed important ecological and movement corridors. Tuwachung and Khuwalung are important ancestral places in Kirati Mundum traditions, associated with early migration and settlement, while Baraha Kshetra is an ancient sacred landscape. These traditions should be distinguished from securely dated archaeological evidence.

=== Ancient Period ===
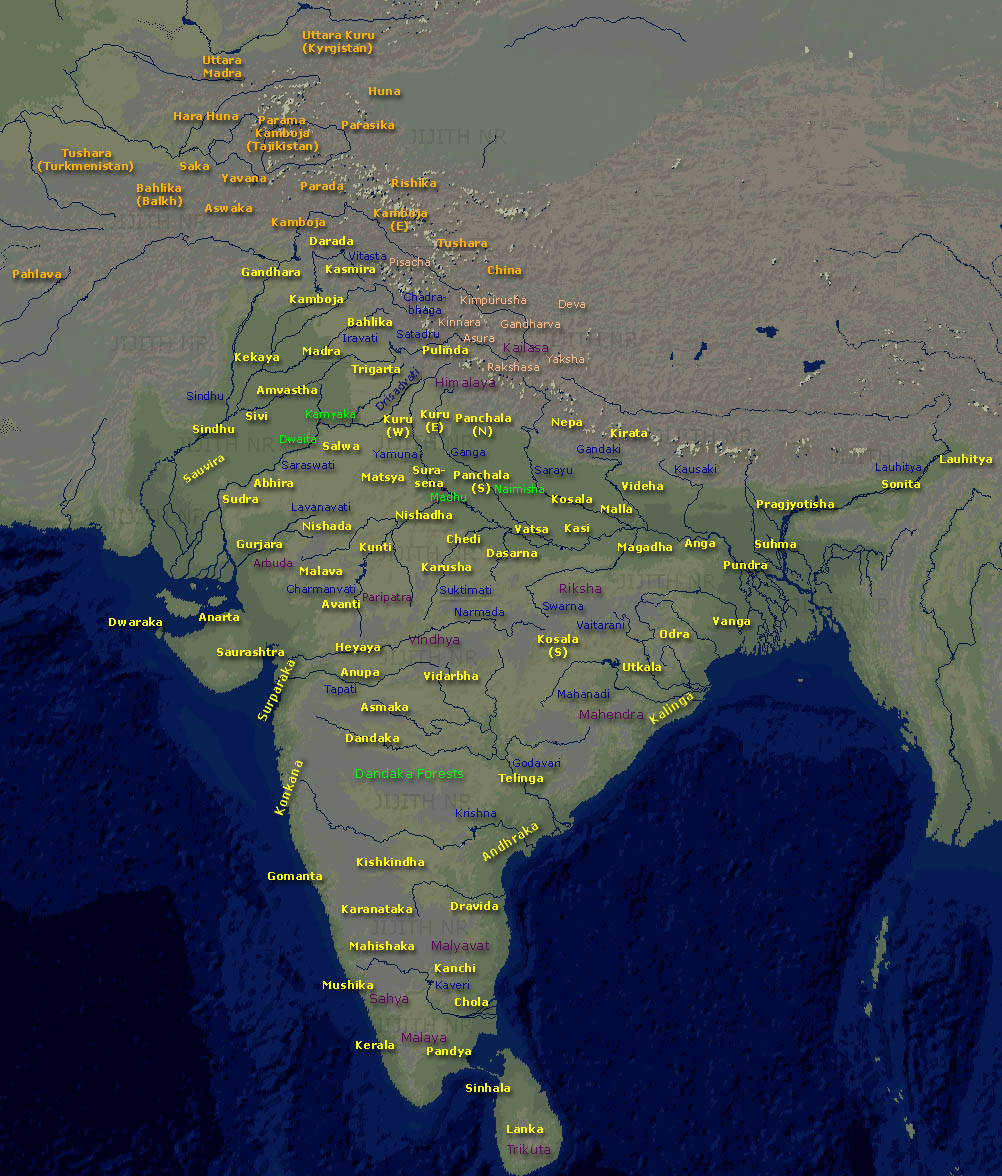
Tribes and nations in the ancient Epic Map of India; describe Kiratas ,Nepa and Videha kingdoms around Kaushik(Koshi) and Gandaki

The history of southeastern Nepal belongs to a wider ancient Himalayan–Terai cultural landscape. Ancient Sanskrit tradition, particularly the Śatapatha Brāhmaṇa, associates Videha with the eastern Gangetic plains, with its territory described in relation to the Gandaki, Koshi and Himalayan foothills. The Videha–Mithila tradition therefore provides an important historical and cultural framework for understanding the ancient Terai of Nepal. Alongside the Mithila/Videha and Kirata is an important component of Nepal’s early historical tradition, particularly in eastern Nepal. Later historical traditions and scholarship associate the Kirat cultural sphere with the eastern Himalayan hills and their connections toward the Terai.

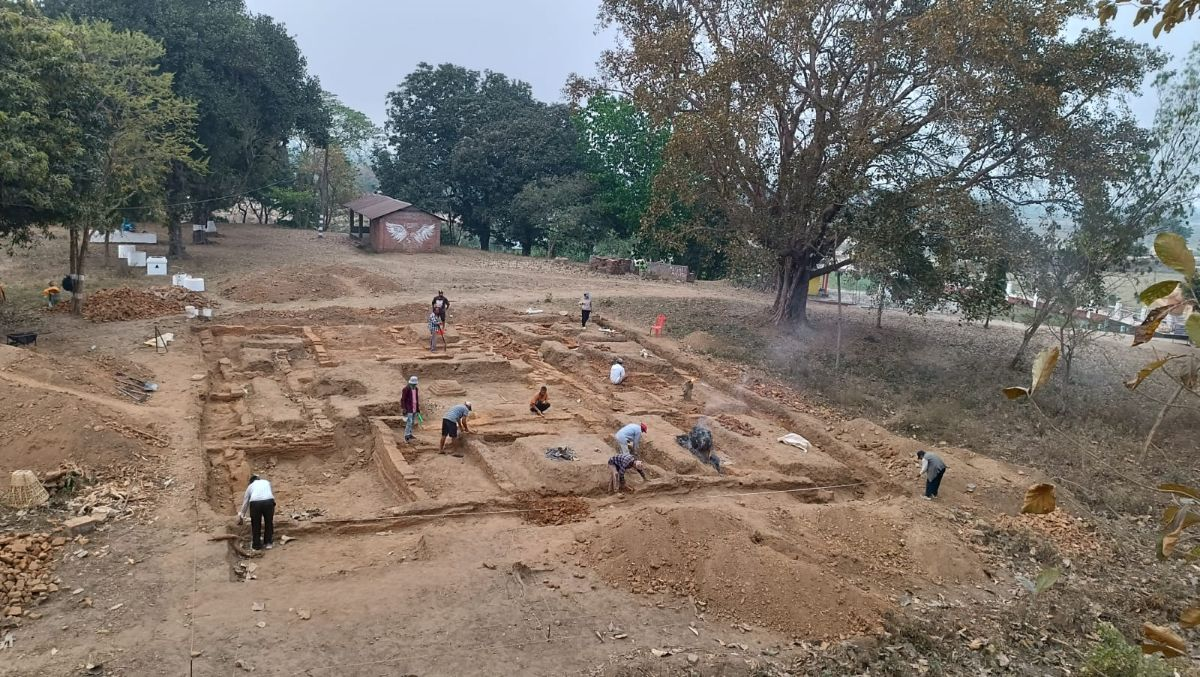
Kichakbadh archeological excavation in Bhadrapur, Jhapa

Kichakbadh in Jhapa provides direct archaeological evidence of an ancient settlement. Excavations have revealed brick structures, a walled complex, pottery, roof tiles and other artefacts. Archaeological research suggests a Śuṅga–Kuṣāṇa-period context, with occupation not later than approximately the 2nd century BCE.

=== Medieval & Modern History ===
During the medieval period, Kirati political traditions and local chiefdoms remained important across the hills of eastern Nepal. The region maintained cultural and economic connections with Tibet, Sikkim and the Himalayan borderlands, as well as with the Mithila–Tirhut region to the south. The later medieval period saw the rise of the Sen kingdoms of Makwanpur, Chaudandi and Vijayapur. Vijayapur became an important political centre, exercising influence over parts of present-day Morang, Sunsari and Jhapa and neighbouring eastern hill territories, while autonomous Kirati communities retained considerable local authority. Eastern Nepal was also connected with Sikkim and Tibet through Himalayan trade routes, migration, pilgrimage and cultural exchange. These connections linked the Kirati and other Himalayan communities with wider networks extending across the eastern Himalayas..

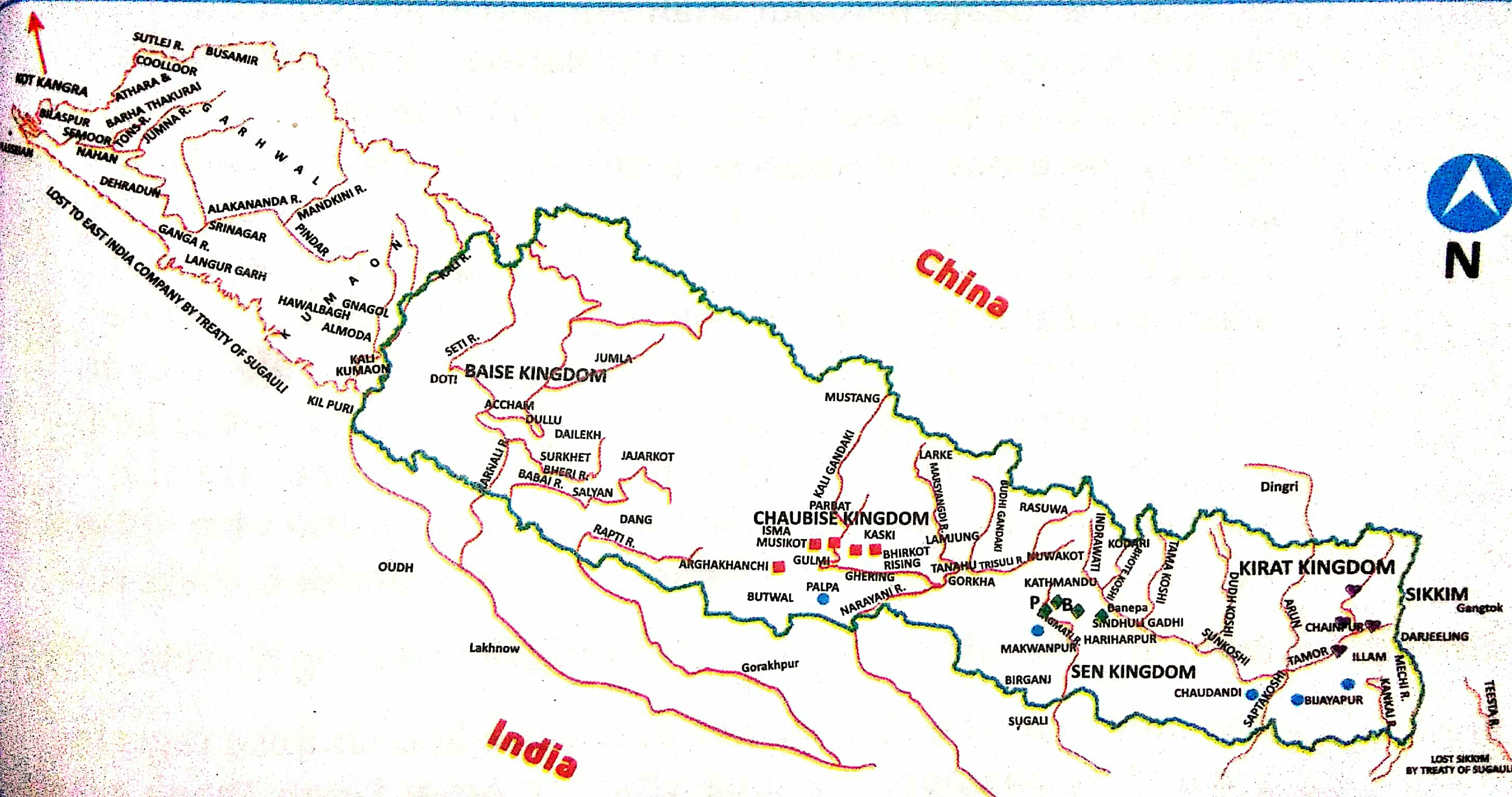
Lost territories of Nepal after Treaty of Sugauli showing the Kirat and Sen Kingdom in Eastern region

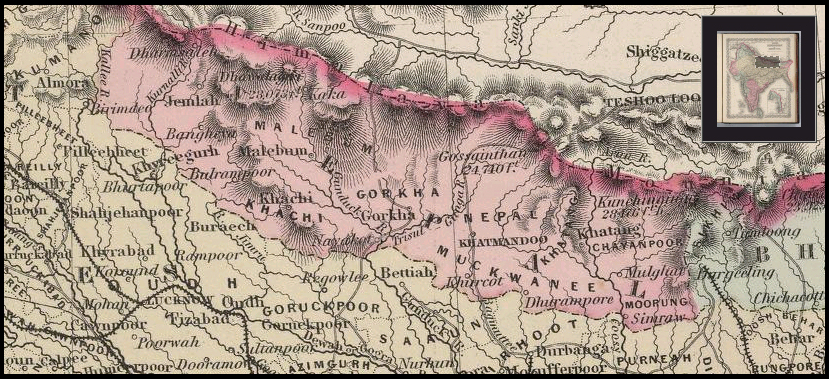
Nepal Map from 1886 showing Khatang( Khotang)and Chayanpoor( Chainpur) the eastern hills, Moorung and Muckwanee in the south, Khatmandoo( Kathmandu Valley) in central region and Gorkha in the west

In the 18th century, Gorkha expansion under Prithvi Narayan Shah progressively incorporated the eastern territories into the expanding Nepalese state. The political changes also affected Nepal's relations and boundaries with Sikkim and Tibet.In the modern period, Morang, Biratnagar, Dharan, Dhankuta, Ilam and Birtamod, Itahari developed as important centres of administration, trade, education, transportation and urbanization. Cross-border links with Sikkim, Tibet and India further strengthened the region's economic and cultural connections, linking the Eastern Himalayas, hills, Tarai and Mithila.

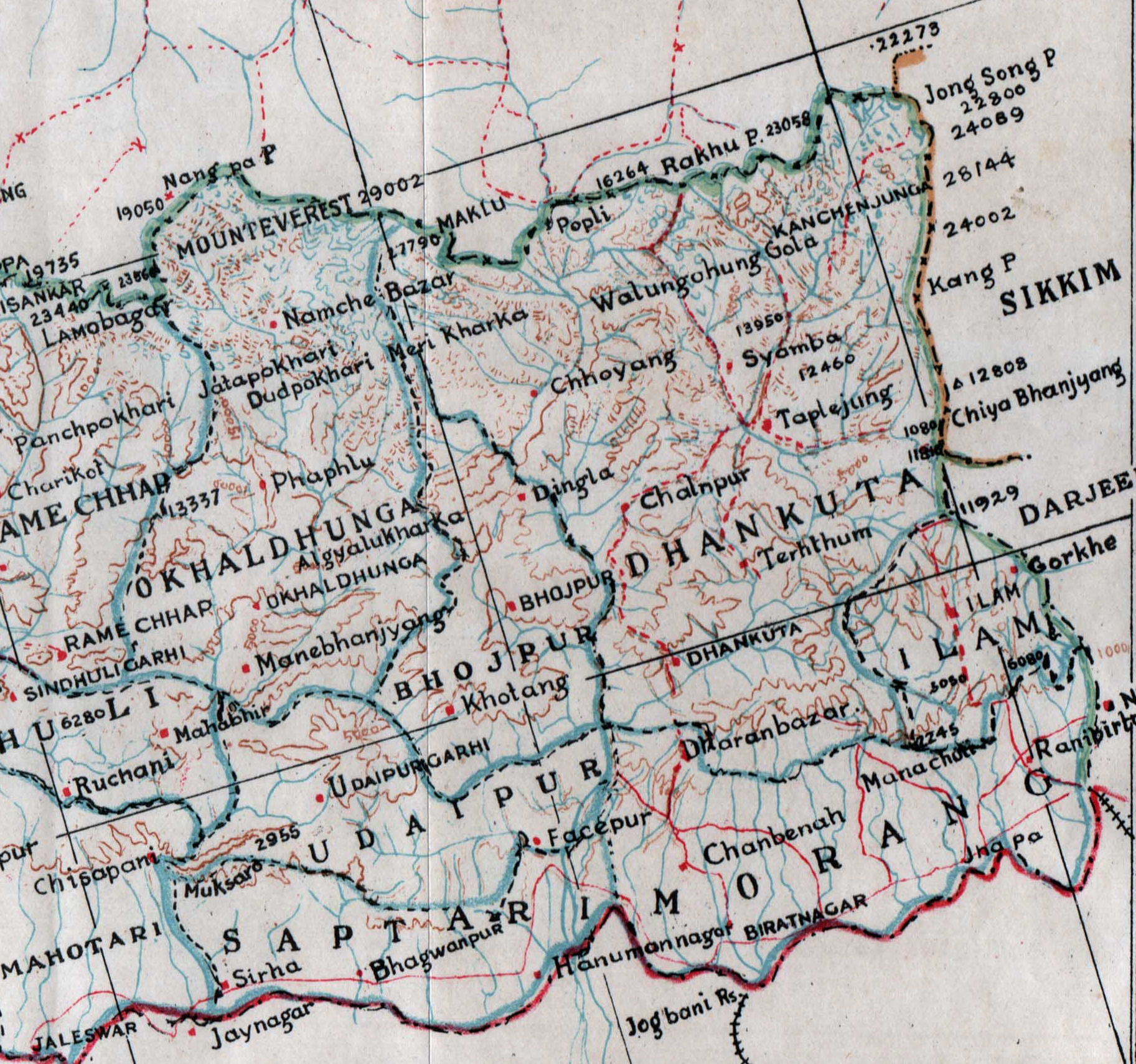
Eastern districts of Nepal in 1942

The term district has been used in various ways throughout the modern history of Nepal. At the end of the Rana regime, Nepal was divided into 32 districts. Eastern Nepal was composed of the following districts:

- Morang District
- Udayapur District
- Ilam District
- Dhankuta District
- Bhojpur District
- Okhaldhunga District

In 1956, the eastern districts of Nepal were grouped together into a region called the Aruṇ Kshetra or Arun Region, after the Arun River which flows through it. Arun Kshetra was made by combining the then five districts; it had total area of 18,000 km^{2} (7,000 sq mi) and a total population of 1.1 million people. The five districts were:

- Biratnagar District: including Sunsari District and Morang District
- Dhankuta District: including Dhankuta District and Sankhuwasabha
- Taplejung District: including Taplejung and Panchtharl
- Mechi District: including Ilam District and Jhapa District
- Bhojpur District: including Bhojpur District and Khotang District

In 1962, the administrative system once again was changed, abolishing the kshetra system. The country was restructured into 75 development districts and those districts were grouped together into zones. In 1972, what is now called Koshi Province was called the Eastern Development Region that was composed of 16 districts which were grouped into three zones: Koshi, Mechi and Sagarmatha.

In 2015, the Constitution was adopted which made 14 districts into an autonomous province which was temporarily named Province No. 1. At the cabinet meeting held on 17 January 2018, the city of Biratnagar was declared the interim capital of Province No. 1. On 6 May 2019, it was declared the permanent capital by a vote of two-thirds of the provincial Member of legislative assembly. On March 1, 2023, the province was named Koshi Province on passage of the bill in Parliament. Later, some protested the name "Koshi".

== Geography ==
Topography of Koshi Pradesh

Koshi Province covers an area of 25,905 km^{2}. The province has three-fold geographical division: Himalayan in the north, Hilly in the middle and Terai in the southern part of Nepal, varying between an altitude of 70 m and 8,848 m. Terai, extended from east to west, is made up of alluvial soil. To the west of Koshi River, in between Mahabharat Range and Churia Range, there elongates a valley called Inner Terai. Churai Range, Mahabharat Range and other hills of various heights, basins, tars, and valleys form the hilly region. Some parts of this region are favorable for agriculture but some other parts are not. The Himalayan region, in the north, consists of many mountains ranges. Mahalangur, Kumbhakarna, Umvek, Lumba Sumba and Janak being some of them. The highest mountain in the world, Mount Everest (8848.86 m); and the third highest mountain, Kangchenjunga (8598 m) also lie in this province.

Nepal's lowest point, Kechana Kawal at 70 m, is located in Jhapa District of this province. There are many river basins and gentle slopes as well. Chure, Mahabharat, many basins, tars, and valleys form the Terai region. Between the Churia and Mahabharat, a low land of inner Terai exists. The Koshi River flows through the region with its seven tributaries; Indrawati, Likhu, Tamur, Dudh Kosi, Arun, Tamakoshi and Bhote Koshi (Sunkoshi). Tundra vegetables, coniferous forests, deciduous monsoon forests, and sub-tropical evergreen woods are vegetations found here. Sub-tropical, temperate, sub-temperate, and alpine and tundra types of climates are found here.

Koshi Pradesh also includes the snow fall capped peaks including Mount Everest, Kangchenjunga, Makalu with Solukhumbu, Sankhuwasabha, and Taplejung districts towards the north, the jungle clad hill tracts of Okhaldhunga, Khotang, Bhojpur, Tehrathum, Ilam and Panchthar in the middle and the alluvial fertile plains of Udayapur, Sunsari, Morang and Jhapa. Province No. 1 includes places like Haleshi Mahadev Temple, Pathivara Temple and Barahachhetra, which are the famous religious shrines for Hindus.

=== Climate ===
Climatic conditions of Nepal vary from one place to another in accordance with their geographical features. Koshi Pradesh has three geographical folds: the lowland of Terai, the hilly region, and the Himalayas' highlands. The low land altitude is 59 m, whereas the highest point is 8848 m.

In the north, summers are cool and winters severe, while in the south, summers are tropical and winters are mild. Climatically, the southern belt of the province, the Terai, experiences a warm and humid climate. Eastern Nepal receives approximately 2,500 millimeters of rain annually. Koshi Pradesh has five seasons: spring, summer, monsoon, autumn and winter.

Average temperatures and precipitation for selected communities in Province No. 1
Location	August (°F)	August (°C)	January (°F)	January (°C)	Annual precipitation (mm/in)
Damak	94 / 82	34 / 28	74 / 47	23 / 8	2618 /103.07
Dharan	85.1/72.3	29.5/22.4	68.4/44.4	20.2/6.9	1416/55.7
Biratnagar	83.1	28.4	60.8	16	1549.8/61
Bhadrapur	82.2	27.9	61.2	16.2	2351.9/92.6
Dhankuta	76.5	24.7	54.5	12.5	1809.5/71.2
Khandbari	74.8	23.8	52	11.1	2040.7/80.3
Ilam	71.8	22.1	50.9	10.5	2551.5/100.5
Itahari	82	27.8	59.5	15.3	1414.8/55.7
Bhojpur	69.1	20.6	46.8	8.2	2290.4/90.2
Khumbu Pasang Lhamu	56.1/38.3	13.4/3.5	33.8/-0.8	1/-18.2	645/25.4

=== Mountains ===
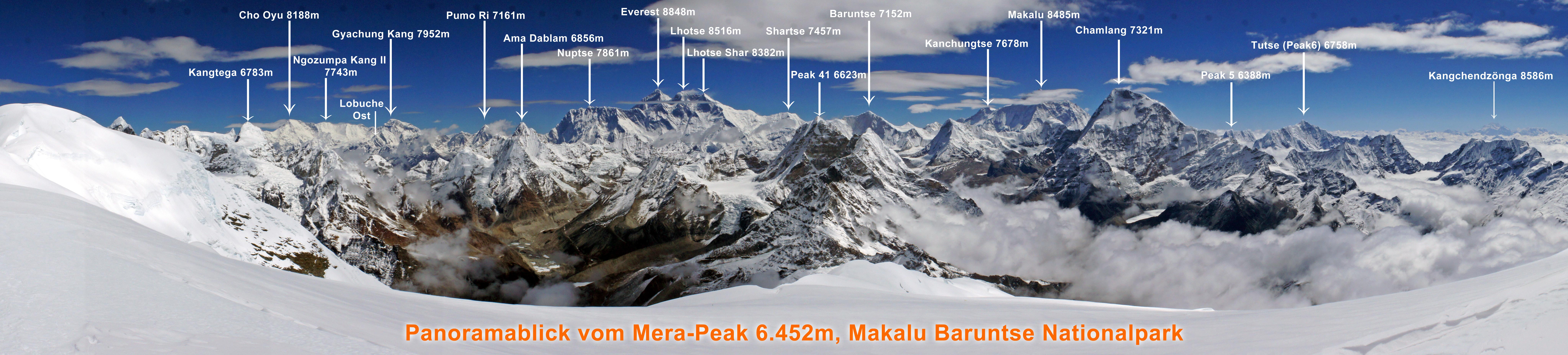

The northern part of Koshi Pradesh has the highest mountain in the world. Here is a list of mountains in Koshi Pradesh.

The following is a list of notable mountains and peaks located in the province, based on the Department of Tourism's mountain records.

Mountain/peak	Elevation (m)	Himalayan range	District
Mount Everest	8,848.86	Khumbu	Solukhumbu
Kangchenjunga	8,586	Kanchenjunga	Taplejung
Lhotse	8,516	Khumbu	Solukhumbu
Yalung Kang	8,505	Kanchenjunga	Taplejung
Makalu	8,463	Makalu	Sankhuwasabha
Cho Oyu	8,201	Khumbu	Solukhumbu
Gyachung Kang	7,952	Khumbu	Solukhumbu
Nuptse	7,855	Khumbu	Solukhumbu
Jannu	7,710	Kanchenjunga	Taplejung
Kirat Chuli	7,365	Kangchenjunga	Taplejung
Kabru	7,318	Kanchenjunga	Taplejung
Chamlang	7,319	Mahalangur	Solukhumbu / Sankhuwasabha
Pumori	7,161	Khumbu	Solukhumbu
Baruntse	7,129	Barun	Solukhumbu / Sankhuwasabha
Ama Dablam	6,814	Khumbu	Solukhumbu
Cho Polu	6,711	Mahalangur	Solukhumbu / Sankhuwasabha
Lingtren	6,713	Mahalangur	Solukhumbu
Thamserku	6,623	Khumbu	Solukhumbu
Mera Peak	6,470	Khumbu	Solukhumbu
Kusum Kanguru	6,367	Khumbu	Solukhumbu
Ombigaichen	6,340	Mahalangur	Solukhumbu
Imja Tse	6,160	Khumbu	Solukhumbu
Nirekha Peak	6,159	Mahalangur	Solukhumbu
Pokalde	5,806	Khumbu	Solukhumbu

=== Rivers ===
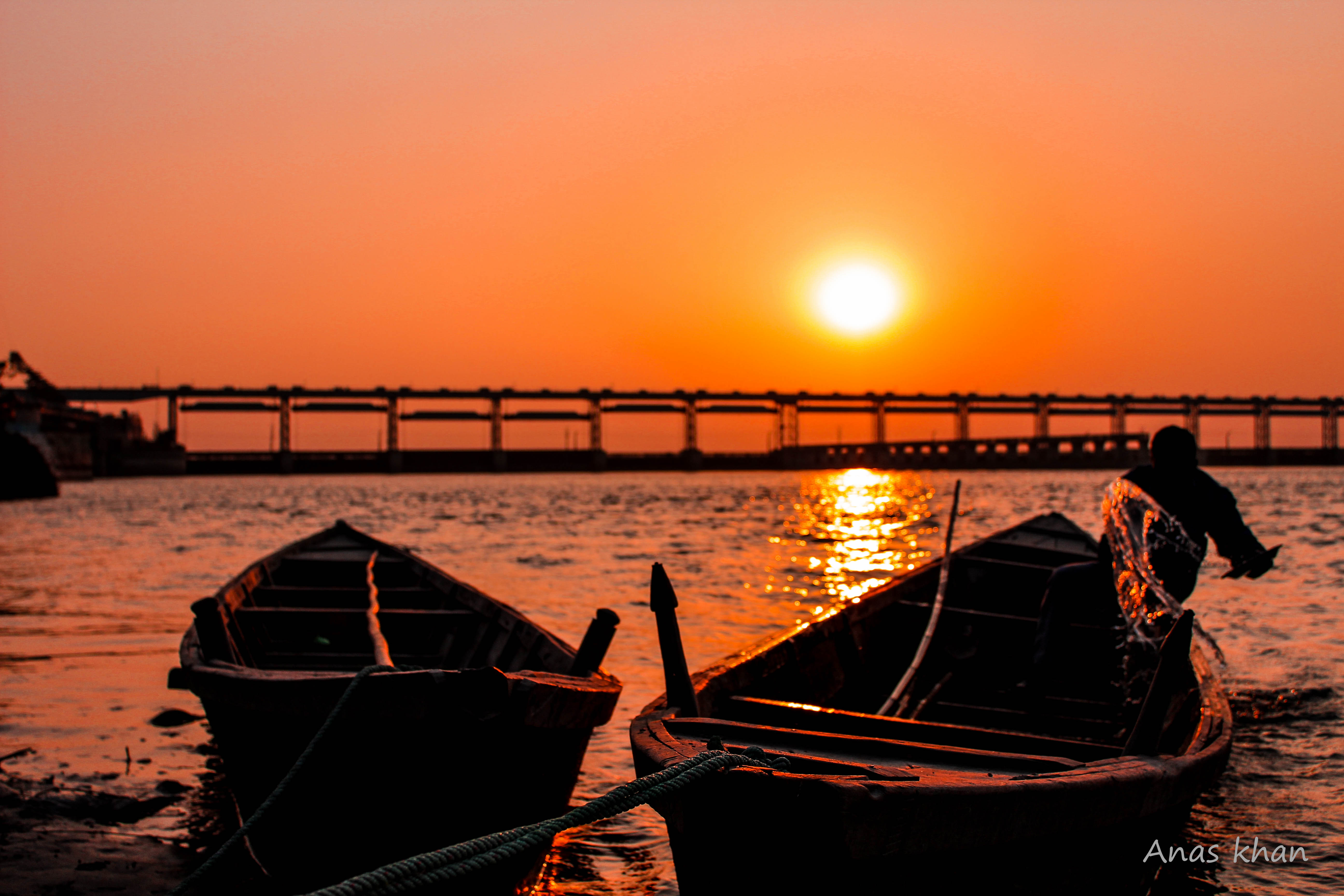
Koshi Barrage over Koshi River

There are many rivers in the region that flow south from the Himalayas which are tributaries of other large rivers that join Ganga River (in India). Sapta Koshi or the Koshi is the main river of the region. Seven tributaries join the Koshi so it is called Saptkoshi.

The major rivers in the province are:

- Mechi River
- Kankai River
- Koshi River (SaptaKoshi) Below given names are tributaries:
  - Tamor
  - Arun River
  - Sun Koshi
  - Dudh Koshi
  - Likhu Khola
  - Tama Koshi
  - Indrawati River

=== Protected areas ===
- Sagarmatha National Park – 1,148 km^{2} (443 sq mi)
- Makalu Barun National Park – 1,500 km^{2} (580 sq mi)
- Koshi Tappu Wildlife Reserve – 175 km^{2} (68 sq mi)
- Kanchenjunga Conservation Area – 2,035 km^{2} (786 sq mi)

== Subdivisions ==
There are 137 local administrative units in this province, including one metropolitan city, 2 sub-metropolitan cities, 46 municipalities and 88 rural municipalities.

=== Districts ===
The province is made up of the 14 following districts:

- Bhojpur District
- Dhankuta District
- Ilam District
- Jhapa District
- Khotang District
- Morang District
- Okhaldhunga District
- Panchthar District
- Sankhuwasabha District
- Solukhumbu District
- Sunsari District
- Taplejung District
- Tehrathum District
- Udayapur District

=== Municipality ===
Cities and villages are governed by municipalities in Nepal. A district may have one or more municipalities. Koshi Province has two types of municipalities.

- Urban municipality (Urban municipality has three levels):
  - Metropolitan city
  - Sub-metropolitan city and
  - Municipality
- Rural municipality (Gaunpalika)

The government of Nepal has set out minimum criteria to meet city and towns. These criteria include a certain population, infrastructure, and revenues.

Largest cities in Koshi Province 2021 census
Rank		District	Pop.
1	Biratnagar	Morang District	244,750
2	Itahari	Sunsari District	198,098
3	Dharan	Sunsari District	173,093
4	Mechinagar	Jhapa District	131,520
5	Sundar Haraicha	Morang District	121,305
6	Birtamod	Jhapa District	117,355
7	Damak	Jhapa District	107,410
8	Triyuga	Udayapur District	104,375
9	Barahakshetra	Sunsari District	91,891
10	Arjundhara	Jhapa District	84,429

== Administration ==
The province is governed by Unicameral parliamentary system of representative Democracy. The house consists of 93 seats where 56 candidates are elected by FPTP and 37 by proportional basis.

The legislative assembly comprises a chief minister who is executive head, deputy chief minister who assists the chief minister, a speaker who hosts the assembly, a deputy speaker who assists the speaker, and various ministries which look over respective departments.

The first provincial elections in Nepal were held on 26 November and 7 December 2017. According to the results of this election in Koshi province, the biggest party is CPN (UML) winning 51 seats; the second biggest party is Nepali Congress which won 21 seats; the third biggest party is CPN (Maoist Center) which won 15 seats .

In a meeting on 17 January 2018, the government of Nepal finalized the temporary capital of Province No. 1, which was renamed as Koshi Province in Falgun 17 2079 and appointed Govinda Subba as the governor. Sher Dhan Rai was elected as first chief minister of Koshi Province on 14 February 2018. Currently Hikmat Kumar Karki is serving as chief minister, the executive head of the Koshi government.

For convenience and decentralisation, the province is divided into 14 districts, making it the province with the most districts in Nepal. CDO is the administrative head of each District. District inturn is further divided into Metropolitan city or/and Sub Metropolitan city or/and Municipality or/and Rural Municipality which has its own Local Government.

== Infrastructure ==
=== Entrepreneurship, Investment, and Emerging Industries ===
Koshi Province has emerged as one of Nepal's most active subnational governments in promoting private sector-led economic growth. The provincial government has pursued a strategy combining policy reform, public–private partnerships, and dedicated investment facilitation to attract domestic and foreign capital across sectors including tourism, agriculture, agro-processing, hydropower, infrastructure, and information technology. The Federation of Nepalese Chambers of Commerce and Industry (FNCCI) maintains a provincial chapter in Koshi, and the Confederation of Nepalese Industries Young Entrepreneurs' Forum (CNIYEF) operates a Koshi Chapter working to develop the next generation of business leaders in the region.

The first Koshi Province Investment Summit was held in Biratnagar on 1–2 May 2025 (Baisakh 18–19, 2082 BS), marking a landmark event in Nepal's federal economic governance. The summit was inaugurated by the then Prime Minister KP Sharma Oli and hosted under the leadership of Chief Minister Hikmat Kumar Karki, with coordination handled by the Provincial Investment Authority (PIA), led by Executive Director Dr. Saroj Koirala. A total of 71 projects across eight sectors — tourism, agriculture, industry, infrastructure, energy, information technology, services, and waste management — were presented to investors, with a combined estimated value of NPR 173.49 billion. Ahead of the event, the provincial government amended eight laws through executive ordinances — including the Provincial Industrial Enterprises Act, the Public Private Partnership and Investment Authority Act, and the Provincial Tourism Act — to remove bureaucratic barriers and create a more investment-friendly legal environment. Investors from China, Russia, the United States, South Korea, India, and the non-resident Nepali diaspora participated alongside major domestic industrialists. By the conclusion of the two-day event, Memoranda of Understanding (MoUs) had been signed for 46 projects worth NPR 152.16 billion, covering agriculture, industry, tourism, infrastructure, energy, information technology, and waste management. An additional five MoUs were concluded in the weeks following the summit, bringing the total to 51 committed projects. Writing in The Kathmandu Post in February 2026, analysts described the summit as a "concrete step toward operationalising federalism through economic governance," arguing it could help transform the province into a production-oriented growth centre contributing to national capital formation and employment generation, in contrast to Nepal's historically import- and consumption-driven fiscal structure.

To sustain the momentum generated by the Investment Summit, the provincial government launched the Udaya project in 2025 with financial and technical support from the Swiss Agency for Development and Cooperation (SDC). Designed to run for ten years — with an initial four-year implementation phase — Udaya targets small and medium enterprises (SMEs) across all 14 districts of Koshi Province with the aim of creating 3,000 jobs in its first phase. The project provides collateral-free loans ranging from NPR 3 million to NPR 30 million through a credit guarantee fund of NPR 600 million, designed to mobilise approximately NPR 8 billion in total bank lending. A Challenge Fund of NPR 280 million will additionally support the promotional and competitive capacity of emerging businesses.

In the information technology sector, the CNIYEF Koshi Chapter organised the 1st Koshi IT Summit 2025 in Biratnagar on 3 May 2025, bringing together industry leaders, policymakers, entrepreneurs, IT professionals, and investors to explore opportunities for leveraging technology as a catalyst for economic growth and innovation in the region. The summit aimed to develop a roadmap for a sustainable IT ecosystem in Koshi Province, foster public–private–academic partnerships, and attract investment into IT-driven startups. Complementing these initiatives, the Step Up project — co-financed by the Happel Foundation and the Swiss Agency for Development and Cooperation — has been active in Koshi Province, promoting youth entrepreneurship and self-employment as a means of reducing outmigration, particularly among young people in rural hill and Terai communities.

Entrepreneurial activity has expanded in Koshi Province in recent years, supported by targeted policies, investment promotion events and a growing startup ecosystem. A special study by Nepal Rastra Bank reported that 160 startup enterprises in the province attracted a combined investment of around Rs 2.56 billion, with approximately 61 percent contributed as equity and 39 percent as loans. The study found that most startups operate in agriculture and forestry, followed by manufacturing, services, tourism and information technology, indicating a gradual diversification of the provincial economy.

=== Healthcare ===
Koshi province stretches from Himalayan region to the Terai belt due to which health facilities are more viable in Terai than other parts.

Koshi Province has 791 public health facilities including four large hospitals (BPKIHS, Koshi Hospital, Nobel Medical College, Birat Medical College). Altogether, there are 18 public hospitals, one regional medical store, 41 primary health centres, 648 health posts, 34 urban health care centres, and 41 community health units.

=== Energy ===
There are various power stations in Koshi province:

- Mai Hydropower Station is one of station located in Illam and was established in 2014 producing 22 MW energy.
- Puwa Khola Hydropower Station is located in Illam with capacity of 6.2 MW energy and was established in 1999.
- Chatara Hydropower Station is located in Sunsari District with production capacity of 3.2 MW energy. It was established in 1996.
- Iwa Khola Hydropower Project was established in 2018–19.
- Upper Mai Hydropower Station is located in Illam with a capacity of 12 MW.
- Pikhuwa Khola Hydropower Station is located in Bhojpur with a capacity of 5 MW.
- Hewa Khola-A Hydroelectric Project is located in Pachthar with a capacity of 14.9 MW.
- Jogmai Khola Hydropower Station is located in Illam with a capacity of 7.6 MW.
- Upper Puwa-1 Hydropower Station is located in Illam with a capacity of 3 MW.
- Upper Mai-C Hydropower Station is located in Illam and was established with a capacity of 6.1 MW.
- Kabeli B1 Hydropower Station is located in Pachthar and was established in 2019 with a capacity of 25 MW.
- Lower Hewa Hydropower Station is located in Pachthar and was established in 2017 with a capacity of 21.6 MW.
- Mai Cascade Hydropower Station is located in Illam and was established in 2014 with a capacity of 8 MW.
- Puwa Khola-1 Hydropower Station is located in Illam and was established in 2014 with a capacity of 4 MW.
- Solu Hydropower Station is located in Solukhumbu and was established in 2016 with a capacity of 23.5 MW.
- Molun Khola Small Hydropower Station is located in Okhaldhunga and was established in 2019 with a capacity of 7 MW.
- Upper Khorunga Hydropower Station is located in Tehrathum and was established in 2018 with a capacity of 7.5 MW.
- Super Mai Hydropower Station is located in Illam and was established in 2020 with a capacity of 7.8 MW.
- Super Mai-A Hydropower Station is located in Illam and was established in 2020 with a capacity of 9.6 MW.
- Super Mai Khola Cascade Hydropower Station is located in Illam and was established in 2020 with a capacity of 3.8 MW.
- Mai Khola Small Hydropower Station is located in Illam and was established in 2008 with a capacity of 4.5 MW.

== Provincial Assembly ==
The first meeting of the provincial assembly was held on 5 February 2018 in Biratnagar and was chaired by Om Prakash Sarbagi. Pradeep Kumar Bhandari was elected unopposed as the Speaker of the Provincial Assembly on 11 February 2018. Saraswoti Pokharel was also elected unopposed to the post of Deputy Speaker on 15 February 2018.

Party	FPTP	PR	Total
CPN (UML)	25	15	40
Nepali Congress	17	12	29
CPN (Maoist Centre)	9	4	13
CPN (Unified Socialist)	3	1	4
Federal Socialist Forum, Nepal	-	1	1
Rastriya Prajatantra Party	2	4	6
Total	56	37	93
Source: Election Commission of Nepal

== Transportation ==
Only three districts out of Koshi's fourteen fall in Terai and one district falls in inner Terai. Elevation from the lowest point of Nepal, Kechana (70 m above sea level) to the highest point of world, Everest (8848 m above sea level) lies in this province, so maintaining a consistent road network is challenging, but all districts are connected by road networks. Air services are available. Rail services are under construction.

=== Roadways ===
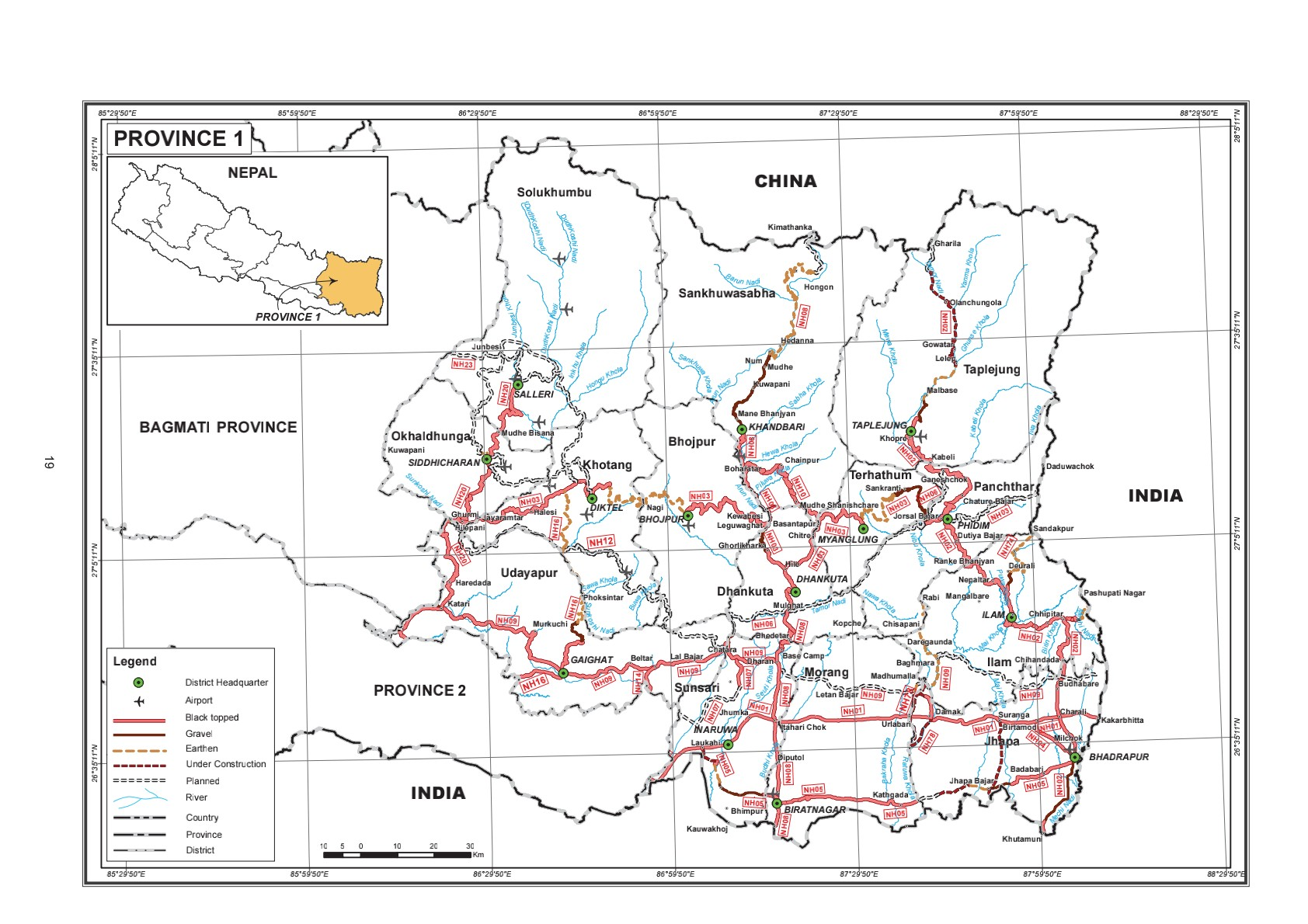
Road and highway map of Koshi Province

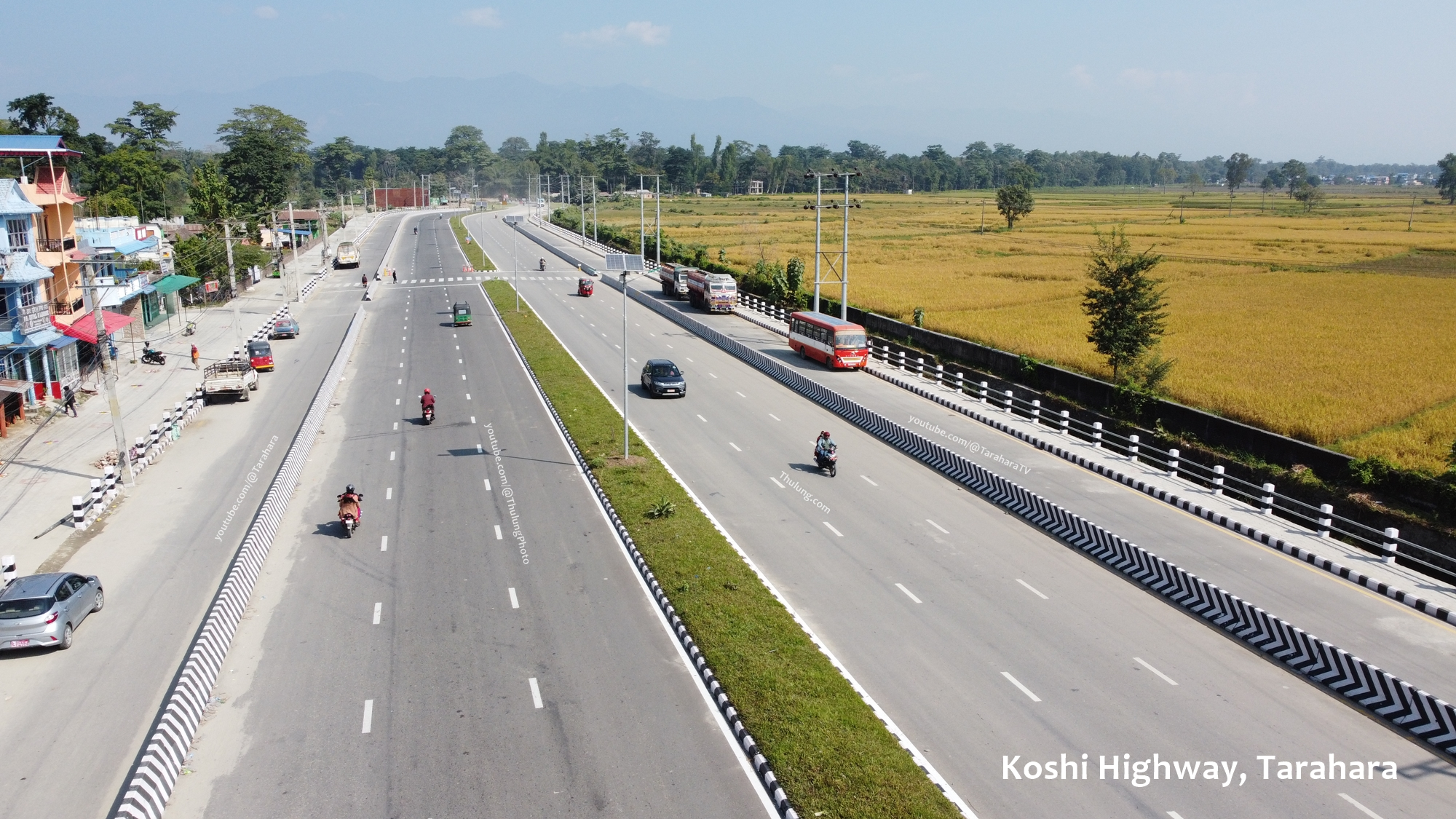
NH08 Koshi Highway at Tarhara

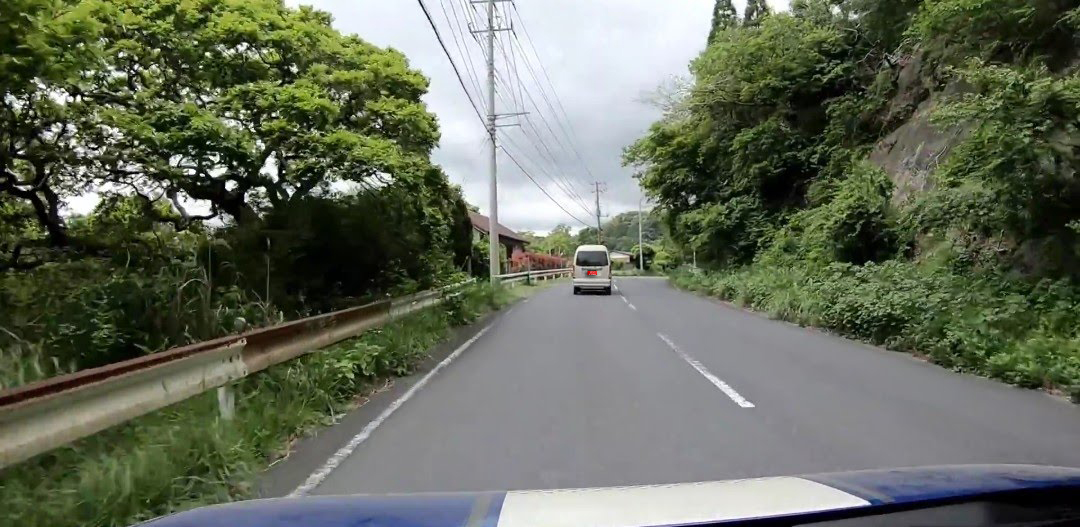
NH2 Mechi Highway near Buddhashanti rural municipality

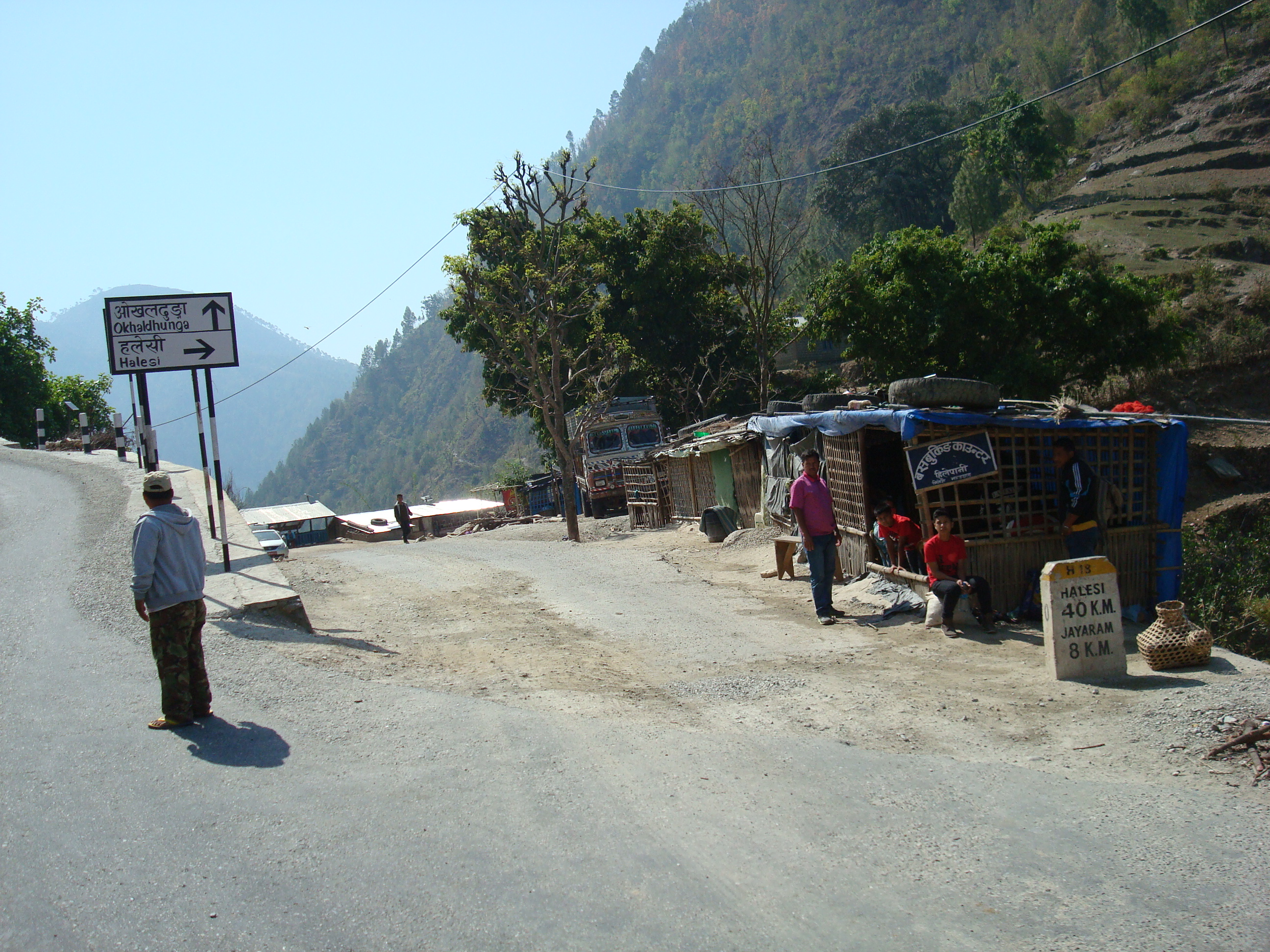
Hilepani Junction at an elevation of 1,822 m (5,978 ft)

Highways in Koshi Province
S#	Highway number	Length	Terminus	Note
1	NH01	135	Kakarbhitta, Koshi Barrage	Interprovincial NH
2	NH02	352	Kechana, Gharila Pass	Provincial NH
3	NH03	525	Chiyo Bhanjyang, Bahadura Khola	Interprovincial NH
4	NH04	15	Birtamod, Chandragadhi	Provincial NH
5	NH05	124	Mechipul, Laukahi	Interprovincial NH
6	NH06	135	Chatara, Ganeshchowk	Provincial NH
7	NH07	48	Chatara, Koshi new bridge	Interprovincial NH
8	NH08	320	Biratnagar, Kimathanka	Provincial NH
9	NH09	250	Bahundangi, Baireni	Interprovincial NH
10	NH10	92	Basantapur, Bohoratar	Provincial NH
11	NH11	19	Phikkal Bazar, Chhabbise	Provincial NH
12	NH12	163	Ghurmi, Barkhadanda	Provincial NH
13	NH14	40	Basaha, Phattehpur	Interprovincial NH
14	NH16	111	Siswari bridge, Mohure	Interprovincial NH
15	NH20	161	Jyamire, Salleri	Interprovincial NH
16	NH23	108	Diktel, Pekarnas	Interprovincial NH
17	NH73	25	Surunga, Lasunganj	Provincial NH
18	NH74	50	Biplate, Sandakpur	Provincial NH
19	NH75	135	Ghorepani, Basa	Provincial NH
20	NH76	44	Chisapani, Rabi	Provincial NH
21	NH78	100	Damak ringroad	Provincial NH
22	NH80	12.29	Cancer Hospital, Belsot	Interprovincial NH

=== Airways ===
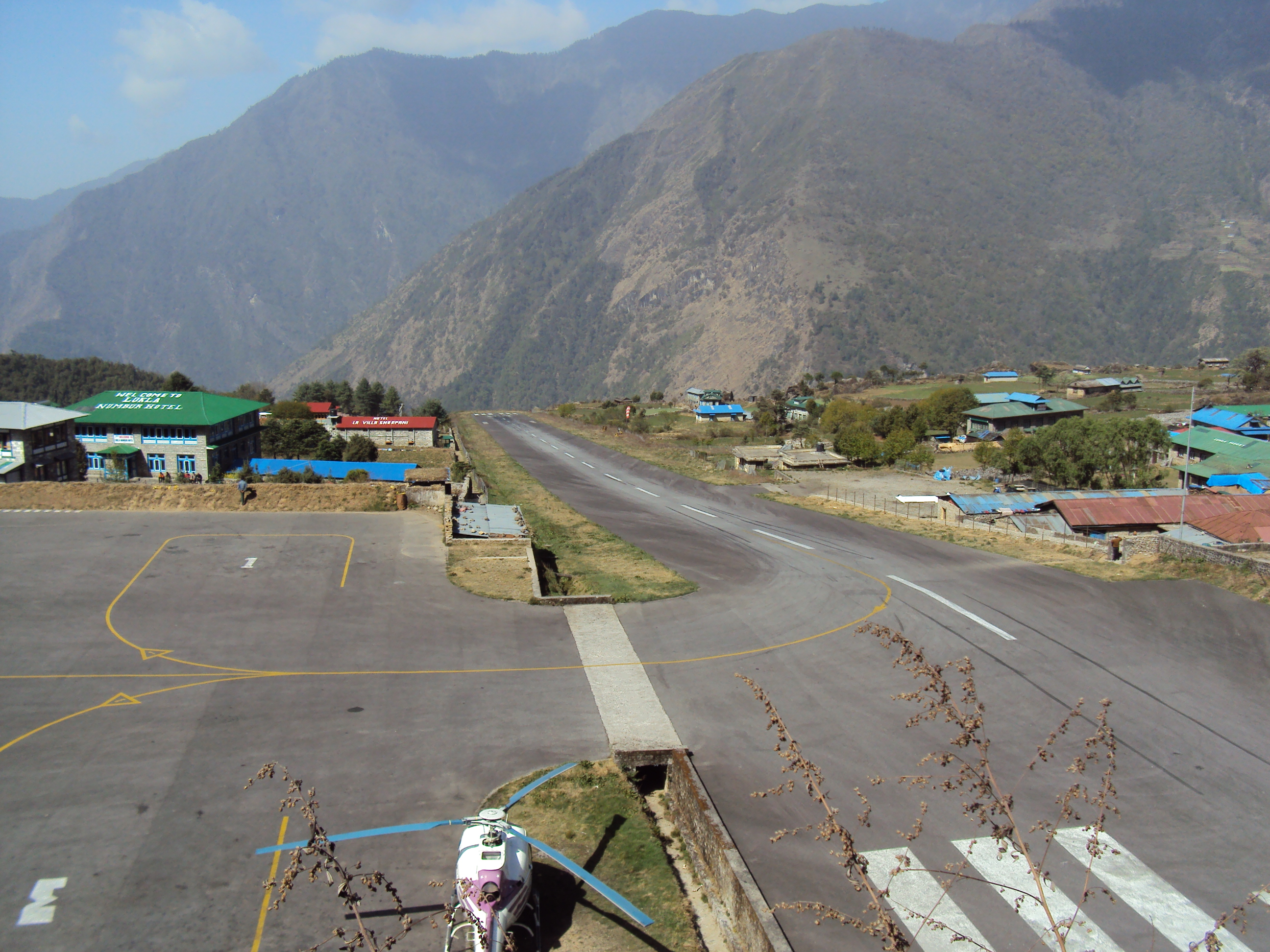
Tenzing-Hillary Airport at Lukla

Many domestic airports and air services are available in the region including one of the most geographically challenging airports, Lukla Airport.

Airports in Koshi:

- Bhojpur Airport (Bhojpur)
- Biratnagar Airport (Biratnagar)
- Kangel Danda Airport (Kangel, Solukhumbu)
- Man Maya Airport (Khanidanda, Khotang)
- Thamkharka Airport (Khotang Bazar)
- Lamidanda Airport (Lamidanda, Khotang)
- Tenzing-Hillary Airport (Lukla, Solukhumbu)
- Phaplu Airport (Phaplu, Solukhumbu)
- Rumjatar Airport (Rumjatar, Okhladhunga)
- Syangboche Airport (Syangboche, Solukhumbu)
- Taplejung Airport (Taplejung)
- Tumlingtar Airport (Tumlingtar, Sankhuwasabha)
- Bhadrapur Airport (Bhadrapur, Jhapa)

=== Railways ===
There is a 13 km railway track which has been laid in Nepal by Indian Railways is connected to Bathnaha railway station. Bathnaha is a village situated at Araria district of Bihar state of India. A custom yard station has been built both side of the border on Bathnaha–Katahari railway section. Katahari is at distance of 18 km from Bathnaha Railway Station. Itahari will be further connected with Katahari, which is 20 km from Biratnagar (Katahari).

== Economy ==
Koshi has the second largest economy in Nepal, and contributes 15% to the national GDP. Koshi's GDP growth rate was estimated to be 6.5% in fiscal year 2018/19.

The population in absolute poverty in Koshi was 12.4%, and the multidimensional poverty rate was 19.7%.

=== Agriculture ===
Agriculture accounts for 38% of Koshi's GDP and is the main source of livelihood for 75% of the population.

The province has 714 registered businesses, with agriculture and forestry industry having the highest number registered businesses 114 (15.96%). Koshi contributes 22% of the total paddy production of Nepal and 29.3% of the national maize production.

== Sports ==
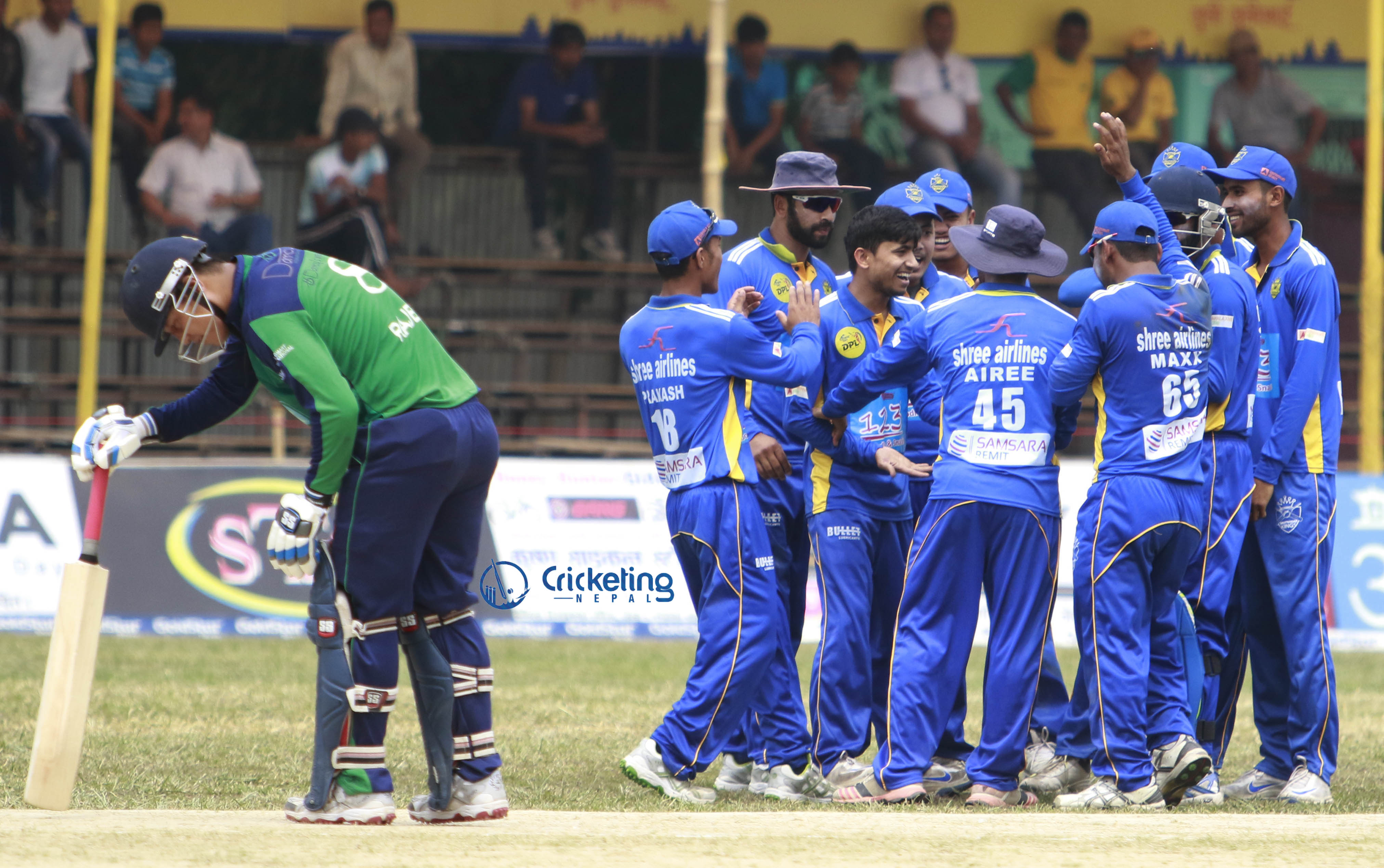
Biratnagar Match

=== Cricket ===
Koshi province has a wide audience in the province. It has been a pioneer in organising night matches. Inaruwa, Sunsari organised the first night cricket in Nepal. The first night football was organised in Duhabi, Sunsari on 31 March 2018.

The provincial teams take part in various games inside and outside Nepal. The team includes men as well as women. The overall sports in the province are administered by the Province 1 Sports Department.

There are numerous stadiums in Koshi:

- Domalal Rajbanshi Stadium, Birtamode, Jhapa
- Inaruwa Stadium, Inaruwa, Sunsari
- Itahari Regional Stadium, Itahari, Sunsari
- Sahid Rangasala, Biratnagar
- Tharuhat Stadium, Gaighat

Major football cups include:

- Birat Gold Cup Biratnagar
- Jhapa Gold Cup, Jhapa
- Budha Subba Gold Cup, Dharan
- Manmohan Duhabi Gold Cup, Duhabi
- Madan Bhandari Invitational Itahari Gold Cup, Itahari
- Udayapur Gold Cup, Udayapur

== Demographics ==
Historical population
Year	Pop.	±% p.a.
1981	2,954,510	—
1991	3,520,335	+1.77%
2001	4,201,795	+1.79%
2011	4,534,943	+0.77%
2021	4,961,412	+0.90%

The total population of the province according to the 2021 Nepal census was 4,961,412, of whom 2,544,084 were women (51.3%). 95 male per 100 female was the sex ratio. There were 1,191,556 households. 79.7% of the total population were literate. 86.1% of the total population of the male were educated, while 73.6% of the total of the female population were literate.

=== Religion ===
Religions of Koshi Province (2021)
1. Hinduism (67.0%)
2. Buddhism (9.00%)
3. Kirat (17.0%)
4. Islam (4.00%)
5. Christianity (2.32%)
6. Prakriti (0.45%)
7. Other (0.08%)

Hinduism is the major religion of the province. Kirat Mundhum is the second major religion of the province. 67% of the total population are Hindus, 17% are Kirantis, 9% are Buddhists, 4% are Muslims, 2% are Christians and others make up 1%.

=== Ethnic groups ===
Castes/ethnic groups in Koshi Province (2021)
1. Chhetri (15.0%)
2. Bahun (11.6%)
3. Rai (10.2%)
4. Limbu (7.80%)
5. Tamang (4.60%)
6. Tharu (4.20%)
7. Muslim (4.10%)
8. Magar (4.00%)
9. Newar (3.60%)
10. Kami (3.40%)
11. Other (31.5%)

As of 2021, Chhetris were the largest ethnic group with 15.0% of the population. Bahun constituted 11.6% of the population, Rai 10.2%, Limbu 7.8%, Tamang 4.6%, Tharu 4.2%, Muslims 4.1%, Magar 4.0%, Newar 3.6%, and Kami 3.4%. The various Madheshi non-Dalit communities were 8.68% of the population, of which the Yadav (1.42%) and Teli (0.98%) were the largest and second-largest non-Dalit communities. Madheshi Dalits were 3.40%, of which Musahar were 1.51%.

=== Language ===
Languages of Koshi Pradesh (2021)
1. Nepali (45.3%)
2. Maithili (11.7%)
3. Yakthung/Limbu (6.70%)
4. Tharu (4.40%)
5. Tamang (3.50%)
6. Magar Dhut (2.90%)
7. Bantawa (2.70%)
8. Rajbanshi (2.60%)
9. Urdu (2.30%)
10. Other (17.9%)

Nepali language is lingua franca of the province and is the mother tongue of 45.3% of the population. Maithili is the second-largest language, spoken by 11.7%. 6.7% of the population spoke Limbu, 4.4% Tharu, 3.5% Tamang, 2.9% Magar Dhut, 2.7% Bantawa, 2.6% Rajbanshi, 2.3% Urdu.

Maithili Language speakers in Koshi Province, Nepal

The Language Commission of Nepal has recommended Limbu and Maithili as official language in the province. The commission has also recommended Tharu, Tamang, Magar, Bantawa, Urdu, Rajbanshi, Nepal Bhasa, Chamling, Sherpa and Santhali to be additional official languages, for specific regions and purposes in the province.

== Education ==
Koshi is renowned for its educational facilities; 71.22% of the population of the province can read and write.

Education up to the level of master's degree is provided by Purbanchal University, which offers courses like Bachelor of Science in Agriculture and Bachelor of Science in Nursing. Insand titutions like BPKIHS, Birat Medical College Teaching Hospital, Nobel Medical College Teaching Hospital, B&C Medical College Teaching Hospital offer MBBS and BDS courses along with paramedic courses.

== Notable people ==
- Girija Prasad Koirala, former prime minister
- KP Sharma Oli, former prime minister
- Bidya Devi Bhandari, former president of Nepal
- Rajendra Prasad Lingden, chairman of Rastriya Prajatantra Party
- Pramod Kharel, singer
- Rachana Rimal, singer
- Nawayug Shrestha, national football player
- Lalit Rajbanshi, national cricket player
- Malvika Subba, Miss Nepal 2002
- Malina Joshi, Miss Nepal 2011
- Manita Devkota, Miss Nepal Universe 2018
- Harka Raj Rai, independent mayor of Dharan
- Sabin Rai, singer
- Siddhicharan Shrestha, writer
- Kiran Chemjong, football player, captain of Nepal national football team
- Dayahang Rai, actor
- Sanduk Ruit, ophthalmologist, referred to as the "God of Sight"
- Mahaguru Phalgunanda, leader of the Kirat religion for the Kirat people
- Lhakpa Sherpa, mountaineer
- Pasang Lhamu Sherpa, mountaineer
- Mira Rai, Nepalese trail runner and sky runner
- Sushila Karki, the first female (interim) prime minister, the former (and the first female) chief justice of the Supreme Court of Nepal
- Phupu Lhamu Khatri, judoka and Olympian
- Swarup Singh Karki, Dewan (prime minister)
- Nikita Chandak, Miss Nepal 2017
- Sugam Pokharel, singer
- Girish Khatiwada, rapper, radio, television personality, and vlogger.
- Bipin Karki, actor
- Sunil Pokharel, actor

== See also ==
- Provinces of Nepal
