= Mai Khola =

River in eastern Nepal

- Location within Nepal

Physical characteristics
- Mouth: Kankai Mai
  - coordinates: 26.8289°N 87.7800°E

The Mai Khola is a river in eastern Nepal, the headwater of the Kankai River. Its water is used for irrigation and also powers several hydroelectric plants.

== Location ==
The Mai Khola is the main tributary of the Kankai. It is a perennial river that originates in springs in the Mahabharat Range about 3,300 metres (10,800 ft) above sea level. It flows from north to south. Major tributaries include the Jog Mai Khola and the Puwa Khola. At its confluence with the Deb Mai Khola, it takes the name of Kankai Mai River, and when it enters the Jhapa District it becomes the Kankai River. The catchment area of the Mai Khola upstream from the Kankai Mai River at Chepte is 1,150 square kilometres (440 sq mi), and lies entirely within the Ilam District.

== Mai AWP ==
The Mai Area Water Partnership (AWP) was established after a June 2002 workshop. It is a network of local water-related institutions with the Namsaling Community Development Centre (NCDC), a non-governmental organization, as the host institution. The purpose was to ensure sustainable irrigation development in the Mai River basin, the only basin in Ilam. For the purpose of a pilot project study the Mai River basin was divided into 14 sub-basins, or blocks. The study found that two of these blocks were water-stressed and another two had only just enough water flows to meet the present demand. One of the challenges of the AWP was to encourage the members to work together as a network, rather than use it as a forum to air grievances. However, it was hoped that the AWP would provide a model for similar partnerships in other parts of Nepal.

== Hydroelectricity ==
As of January 2020, seven hydropower projects on the Mai Khola were operational and another three were under development. If the 6.2 MW Puwa Khola Hydropower Station is included, the total output of active and under construction plants on the river reaches 86.97 MW. The projects were:

Output	Project	Status	Commissioned	Developer
4.5 MW	Mai Khola Small Hydropower Station	Active	2008-01-28	Himal Dolakha Hydropower
22 MW	Mai Hydropower Station	Active	2015-01-28	Sanima Mai Hydropower
7 MW	Mai Cascade Hydropower Plant	Active	2016-04-01	Sanima Mai Hydropower
12 MW	Upper Mai Hydropower Station	Active	2016-06-23	Mai Valley Hydropower
6.1 MW	Upper Mai-C Hydropower Station	Active	2017-07-24	Mai Valley Hydropower
8 MW	Mai Cascade Hydropower Plant	Active	2018-04-09	Himal Dolakha Hydropower
7.8 MW	Super Mai Hydropower Station	Active	2018-10-28	Super Mai Hydro Power
9.6 MW	Super Mai-A Hydropower Station	Active		Super Mai Hydro Power
3.8 MW	Super Mai Khola Cascade Hydropower Station	Active		Super Mai Hydro Power
9.51 MW	Mai Beni Hydropower Project	Active	2021-09-17	Urja Developers

The intake to the 6.2 MW Puwa Khola Hydropower Station is on the Puwa River about 500 metres (1,600 ft) above the Geya Danda Irrigation System. About 250 liters per second (3,300 imp gal/min) of water is diverted to the power station. The diverted water flows along a 3.2 kilometres (2.0 mi) headrace tunnel and then a 990 metres (3,250 ft) penstock pipe to the power station, which discharges it into the left bank of the Mai Khola. This leaves very little irrigation water in the dry season.

== Sources ==
- Hirakaji Ghale (September 2005), Independent Evaluation of Mai River Area Water Partnership (AWP) (PDF), Min Bhawan, Kathmandu: Consolidated Management Services Nepal (CMS)
- Kokila Dhakal (27 January 2020), "Mai Khola To Have 10 Hydro Projects", The Rising Nepal
- "Mai Khola", NWRP: Nepal Water Resource Profile
- Sewanta Kattel (December 2006), "Dispute Management in Farmer's Managed Irrigation System: A Case Study of Geya Danda Irrigation System of Eastern Nepal", Dhaulagiri Journal of Sociology and Anthropology, 1: 87–96, doi:10.3126/dsaj.v1i0.277
