= Upper Mai-C Hydropower Station =

- Location within Nepal
- Official name: Upper Mai -C Hydropower Project
- Country: Nepal
- Location: Ilam District
- Coordinates: 27°00′00″N 87°58′09″E
- Purpose: Power
- Status: Operational
- Owner: Mai Valley Hydropower

Dam and spillways
- Type of dam: Gravity
- Impounds: Mai Khola

Power Station
- Commission date: 2074-04-09 BS
- Type: Run-of-the-river
- Installed capacity: 6.1 MW

Upper Mai-C Hydropower Station (Nepali: माथिल्लो माई C जलविद्युत आयोजना) is a 6.1 MW run-of-the-river hydro-electric plant located in Ilam District of Nepal. It is powered by water from the Mai Khola.

== Location and water supply ==
The Upper Mai-C Hydropower Station (UMCHEP) is located in the Mabu and Sulubung VDCs, in Sandakpur Gaunpalika, Ilam district. The flow from Mai Khola is used to generate 6.1 MW electricity. Upper Mai C is a cascade project that uses the discharge from the tailrace of the Upper Mai Hydropower Station and additional discharge from streams that flow into the Mai river. The catchment area at the intake is 70 square kilometres (27 sq mi). The design discharge is 4.62 cubic metres per second (163 cu ft/s) with a net head of 155.25 metres (509.4 ft) at full discharge. The station one of ten operational or under construction power plants on the Mai Khola.

== Technical ==
The headworks include a free overflow type diversion weir at an altitude of 1,245.21 metres (4,085.3 ft) above sea level. The weir is 3.62 metres (11.9 ft) high and 11 metres (36 ft) long at the crest. Water flows through a bottom-type intake, sediment trap and flushing gallery through a settling basin with two chambers to a collection pond with normal water level 1,243.5 metres (4,080 ft) above sea level.

The waterways include a 62 metres (203 ft) siphon crossing the Mai Khola, a 1,396 metres (4,580 ft) headrace pipe with internal diameter of 1.950 metres (6 ft 4.8 in), a 976 metres (3,202 ft) headrace tunnel with inverted D shape 2 by 2 metres (6 ft 7 in by 6 ft 7 in) in cross section, to a surge shaft and rock trap at the powerhouse. The powerhouse is 1,080 metres (3,540 ft) above sea level. Water is discharged through a 41 metres (135 ft) tailrace.

The powerhouse contains two horizontal Francis turbines with rated net head 154.3 metres (506 ft) and discharge 2.32 cubic metres per second (82 cu ft/s), each with 3050 kW rated output. There are two synchronous brushless 6.6 kV generators. A three-phase transformer steps up the voltage to 132 kV for transmission over a line that is combined with the Upper Mai Hydropower Station. Average electricity generated is 30 GWH. Electricity is carried to the Godak substation of the NEA along a 18.5 kilometres (11.5 mi) 132 kv transmission line.

== Commercial ==
The plant is owned and developed by Panchakanya Mai Hydropower, an Independent Power Producer. The company was incorporated on 30 January 2003 as East Nepal Development Endeavour Private Limited. It was renamed to Mai Valley Hydropower Private Limited on 15 January 2009, then to Panchakanya Mai Hydropower Limited (PMHL) on 21 March 2016.

The estimated cost of the project was NPR 1,050 million, of which about 64.36% was to be financed through bank loans and the remainder from equity. In January 2018 the company said it was offering 10% of its IPO shares for sale to local people of Sandakpur Rural Municipality and Ilam Municipality. However, as of April 2018 it was listed among hydropower companies operating after 2010 that had not issued local shares.

The plant came into commercial operation on 24 July 2017 (2074-04-09BS). The generation licence will expire after 35 years 2105-03-20 BS, after which the plant will be handed over to the government. The power station is connected to the national grid and the electricity is sold to Nepal Electricity Authority. The tariff is NPR 4.8 per kWhr in the wet season and NPR 8.4 per kWhr in the dry season.

== See also ==
- List of power stations in Nepal

== Sources ==
- An in-depth examination of the opportunities and risks for local communities seeking to invest in nepal's hydropower projects, International Finance Corporation, 2018
- Kokila Dhakal (27 January 2020), "Mai Khola To Have 10 Hydro Projects", The Rising Nepal
- "Mai Khola", NWRP: Nepal Water Resource Profile
- Panchakanya Mai Hydropower Limited (PDF), ICRA Nepal, July 2017
- "Panchakanya Mai Hydropower to issue IPO to locals", My Republica
- Power Plants :: Hydro (More than 1MW), Nepal Ministry of Energy, Water Resources and Irrigation – Department of Energy Development, 27 November 2020, archived from the original on 2020-11-10
- Upper Mai C Hydroelectric Project (UMCHEP), Panchakanya Mai Hydropower Limited
- "Upper Mai in National Grid", NepalEnergyForum, 2017-07-11
