= Jogmai Khola Hydropower Station =

- Location within Nepal
- Official name: Jogmai Khola Hydropower Project
- Country: Nepal
- Location: Ilam District
- Coordinates: 26°54′40″N 88°03′20″E
- Purpose: Power
- Status: Operational
- Owner: Sanvi Energy Pvt. Ltd.

Dam and spillways
- Type of dam: Gravity
- Impounds: Jogmai River

Power Station
- Commission date: 2074-01-18 BS
- Type: Run-of-the-river
- Installed capacity: 7.6 MW

Jogmai Khola Hydropower Station (Nepali: जोग माई खोला जलविद्युत आयोजना) is a run-of-river hydro-electric plant located in Ilam District of Nepal. The flow from Jogmai River is used to generate 7.6 MW electricity. The plant is owned and developed by Sanvi Energy Pvt. Ltd., an IPP of Nepal. The plant started generating electricity from 2074-01-18BS. The generation licence will expire in 2104-12-28 BS, after which the plant will be handed over to the government. The power station is connected to the national grid and the electricity is sold to Nepal Electricity Authority.

== See also ==
- List of power stations in Nepal
