= Mai Cascade Hydropower Plant =

Mai Cascade Hydropower Project
- Official name: Sanima Mai Hydropower Project
- Country: Nepal
- Location: Ilam district
- Purpose: Power
- Status: In operation
- Construction began: 2010
- Opening date: 2015
- Owner: Sanima Mai Hydropower Pvt. Ltd.

Dam and spillways
- Type of dam: Gravity
- Impounds: Mai Khola

Mai Hydropower Station
- Coordinates: 26°45′57″N 87°52′9″E
- Commission date: 2015
- Type: Run-of-the-river
- Hydraulic head: 30 m (98 ft)
- Turbines: 3 x 2.33 MW horizontal Francis-type
- Installed capacity: 7 MW

Mai Cascade Hydropower Station is a run-of-the-river hydroelectric power station with an installed capacity of 7 MW. This power station is located at Danabari VDC in Ilam district of Nepal. The plant utilizes tail water of Mai Hydropower Station. The construction of the power station started on 2013 and was completed in 2015.

The electricity is evacuated through 33 kV transmission line of about 4.0 km length up to switchyard area of Mai hydropower project. The transmission line is further connected to the national grid through a 132KV transmission line.

== See also ==
- Mai Hydropower Station
