= Puwa Khola Hydropower Station =

- Location within Nepal
- Official name: Puwa Khola Hydropower Project
- Country: Nepal
- Coordinates: 26.9865°N 87.8943°E
- Purpose: Power
- Status: Operational
- Owner: Nepal Electricity Authority

Dam and spillways
- Type of dam: Gravity
- Impounds: Puwa Khola

Power Station
- Commission date: 2060-12-22 BS
- Type: Run-of-the-river
- Turbines: Pelton
- Installed capacity: 6.2 MW

Puwa Khola Hydropower Station (Nepali: पुवा खोला जलविद्युत आयोजना) is a run-of-the-river hydro-electric plant located in Ilam District of Nepal. The flow from Puwa River, a tributary of the Mai Khola, is used to generate 6.2 MW electricity. The plant is owned and developed by Nepal Electricity Authority, a government-owned public company. The plant started generating electricity in 2060-12-22 BS. The generation licence would expire in 2101-12-30 BS, after which the plant would be handed over to the government. The power station is connected to the national grid.

== See also ==
- List of power stations in Nepal
