= Super Mai Hydropower Station =

- Location within Nepal
- Official name: Super Mai Hydropower Project Hydropower Project
- Country: Nepal
- Location: Ilam District
- Coordinates: 26°56′27″N 87°57′47″E
- Purpose: Power
- Status: Operational
- Owner: Supermai Hydropower Pvt.Ltd.

Dam and spillways
- Type of dam: Gravity
- Impounds: Mai River

Power Station
- Commission date: 2075-07-11 BS
- Type: Run-of-the-river
- Installed capacity: 7.8 MW

Super Mai Hydropower Station (Nepali: सुपर माई जलविद्युत आयोजना) is a run-of-the-river hydro-electric plant located in Ilam District of Nepal. The flow from Mai River is used to generate 7.8 MW electricity.

The plant is owned and developed by Supermai Hydropower Pvt. Ltd., an IPP of Nepal. The plant started generating electricity in 2018. The generation licence will expire in 2052, after which the plant will be handed over to the government. The power station is connected to the national grid and the electricity is sold to Nepal Electricity Authority.

== Finance ==
The project was constructed with a joint investment of NPR 1.50 billion by Siddhartha Bank, Sanima Bank, Century Commercial Bank and Jyoti Bikas Bank.

== See also ==
- List of power stations in Nepal
