= Mai Hydropower Station =

Hydroelectric power station in Ilam, Nepal

Mai Hydropower Project
- Location within Nepal
- Official name: Sanima Mai Hydropower Project
- Country: Nepal
- Location: Ilam district
- Coordinates: 26°49′22″N 87°53′31″E
- Purpose: Power
- Status: Operational
- Construction began: 2010
- Opening date: 2015
- Owner: Sanima Mai Hydropower Pvt. Ltd.

Dam and spillways
- Type of dam: Gravity
- Impounds: Mai Khola
- Height: 12 m (39 ft)
- Length: 110 m (360 ft)

Mai Hydropower Station
- Coordinates: 26°47′32″N 87°52′41″E
- Commission date: 2016
- Type: Run-of-the-river
- Hydraulic head: 121.5 m (399 ft)
- Turbines: 3 x 7.5 MW Francis-type
- Installed capacity: 22 MW

Sanima Mai Hydropower Station is a run-of-the-river hydroelectric power station with an installed capacity of 22 MW. This power station is located at Gunmune and Chisapani VDC in Ilam district of Nepal. Construction began in 2010 and all major works were completed by October 2014. However, the power station did not become operational at the time due to an unfinished transmission line. It became fully operational on February 26, 2015.

The plant is operated by Sanima Mai Hydropower Limited, a public company developing various hydropower projects in Nepal.

== See also ==
- Mai Cascade Hydropower Plant
- List of power stations in Nepal
