= Super Mai-A Hydropower Station =

- Location within Nepal
- Official name: Super Mai-A HPP Hydropower Project
- Country: Nepal
- Location: Ilam District
- Coordinates: 26°58′08″N 87°58′26″E
- Purpose: Power
- Status: Operational
- Owner: Sagarmatha Jalbidhyut Company P.Ltd.

Dam and spillways
- Type of dam: Gravity
- Impounds: Mai River

Power Station
- Commission date: 2077-02-32 BS
- Type: Run-of-the-river
- Installed capacity: 9.6 MW
- Annual generation: 3 Francis Type

Super Mai-A Hydropower Station (Nepali: सुपर माई A जलविद्युत आयोजना) is a run-of-the-river hydro-electric plant located in Ilam District of Nepal. The flow from Mai River is used to generate 9.6 MW electricity. The design head is 199.3 m.

The plant is owned and developed by Sagarmatha Jalbidhyut Company Pvt. Ltd., an IPP of Nepal. The plant started generating electricity from 2077-02-32BS. The generation licence will expire in 2109-11-17 BS, after which the plant will be handed over to the government. The power station is connected to the national grid and the electricity is sold to Nepal Electricity Authority.

== See also ==
- List of power stations in Nepal
