= Upper Khorunga Hydropower Station =

Upper Khorunga HPP Hydropower Station
- Location within Nepal
- Official name: Upper Khorunga HPP Hydropower Project
- Country: Nepal
- Location: Terhathum District
- Coordinates: 27°11′48″N 87°32′30″E
- Purpose: Power
- Status: Operational
- Owner: Terhathum Power Company Pvt. Ltd.

Dam and spillways
- Type of dam: Gravity
- Impounds: Khoranga River

Power Station
- Commission date: 2076-11-17 BS
- Type: Run-of-the-river
- Installed capacity: 7.5 MW

Upper Khorunga Hydropower Station (Nepali: माथिल्लो खोरुगां जलविद्युत आयोजना) is a run-of-river hydro-electric plant located in Terhathum District of Nepal. The flow from Khoranga River is used to generate 7.5 MW electricity.

The plant is owned and developed by Terhathum Power Company Pvt. Ltd., an IPP of Nepal. The plant started generating electricity from 2076-11-17BS. The generation licence will expire in 2106-11-06 BS, after which the plant will be handed over to the government. The power station is connected to the national grid at Jirikhimti Bazar and the electricity is sold to Nepal Electricity Authority.

== Finance ==
Machhapuchhre Bank leading the consortium of Nepal Bangladesh Bank and Janata Bank Nepal financed NPR 1 billion in the project with a debt-equity ratio of 73%-27%.

== See also ==
- List of power stations in Nepal
