= Constituency Delimitation Commission, Nepal =

Federal commission in Nepal

The Constituency Delimitation Commission (निर्वाचन क्षेत्र निर्धारण आयोग) was formed by government of Nepal to carry out delimitation of federal boundaries in Nepal. It was formed on 20 July 2017. The Commission was led by former Justice of the Supreme Court Kamal Narayan Das. The other members of the Committee were Madhav Adhikari, Bishwa Kalyan Parajuli and Ganesh Raj Karki and Yogendra Sharma Paudel was named the Commission Secretary.

Article 286 of Constitution of Nepal calls for a Constituency Delimitation Commission.

== See also ==
- Election Commission, Nepal
