= Mai Khola Small Hydropower Station =

- Location within Nepal
- Official name: Mai Cascade HPP Hydropower Project
- Country: Nepal
- Location: Ilam District
- Coordinates: 26°52′36″N 87°55′47″E
- Purpose: Power
- Status: Operational
- Owner: Himal Dolkha Hydropower Company Pvt Ltd

Dam and spillways
- Type of dam: Gravity
- Impounds: Mai Khola River

Power Station
- Commission date: 2064-08-20 BS
- Type: Run-of-the-river
- Installed capacity: 4.5 MW

Mai Khola Small Hydropower Station (Nepali: माई खोला सानो जलविद्युत आयोजना) is a run-of-the-river hydro-electric plant located in Ilam District of Nepal. The flow from Mai River is used to generate 8 MW electricity. The plant is owned and developed by Himal Dolkha Hydropower Company Pvt Ltd, an IPP of Nepal.

The plant started generating electricity in 2064-10-14 BS. The generation licence will expire in 2099-08-19 BS, after which the plant will be handed over to the government. The power station is connected to the national grid and the electricity is sold to Nepal Electricity Authority.

== See also ==
- List of power stations in Nepal
