= Super Mai Khola Cascade Hydropower Station =

- Location within Nepal
- Official name: Super Mai Khola Cascade HPP Hydropower Project
- Country: Nepal
- Location: Ilam District
- Coordinates: 26°55′41″N 87°57′13″E
- Purpose: Power
- Status: Operational
- Owner: Mai Khola Hydropower Pvt.Ltd.

Dam and spillways
- Type of dam: Gravity
- Impounds: Mai River

Power Station
- Commission date: 2077-03-31 BS
- Type: Run-of-the-river
- Installed capacity: 3.8 MW

Super Mai Khola Cascade Hydropower Station (Nepali: सुपर माई खोला क्यसकेड जलविद्युत आयोजना) is a run-of-the-river hydro-electric plant located in Ilam District of Nepal. The flow from Mai River is used to generate 3.8 MW electricity.

The plant is owned and developed by Mai Khola Hydropower Pvt. Ltd., an IPP of Nepal. The plant started generating electricity from 2077-03-31BS. The generation licence will expire in 2110-11-04 BS, after which the plant will be handed over to the government. The power station is connected to the national grid and the electricity is sold to Nepal Electricity Authority.

== Finance ==
The project cost was NPR 55.75 crore, of which 41.75 crore was financed by the bank and the rest was private equity from the developer.

== See also ==
- List of power stations in Nepal
