= Kankai River =

River in Nepal

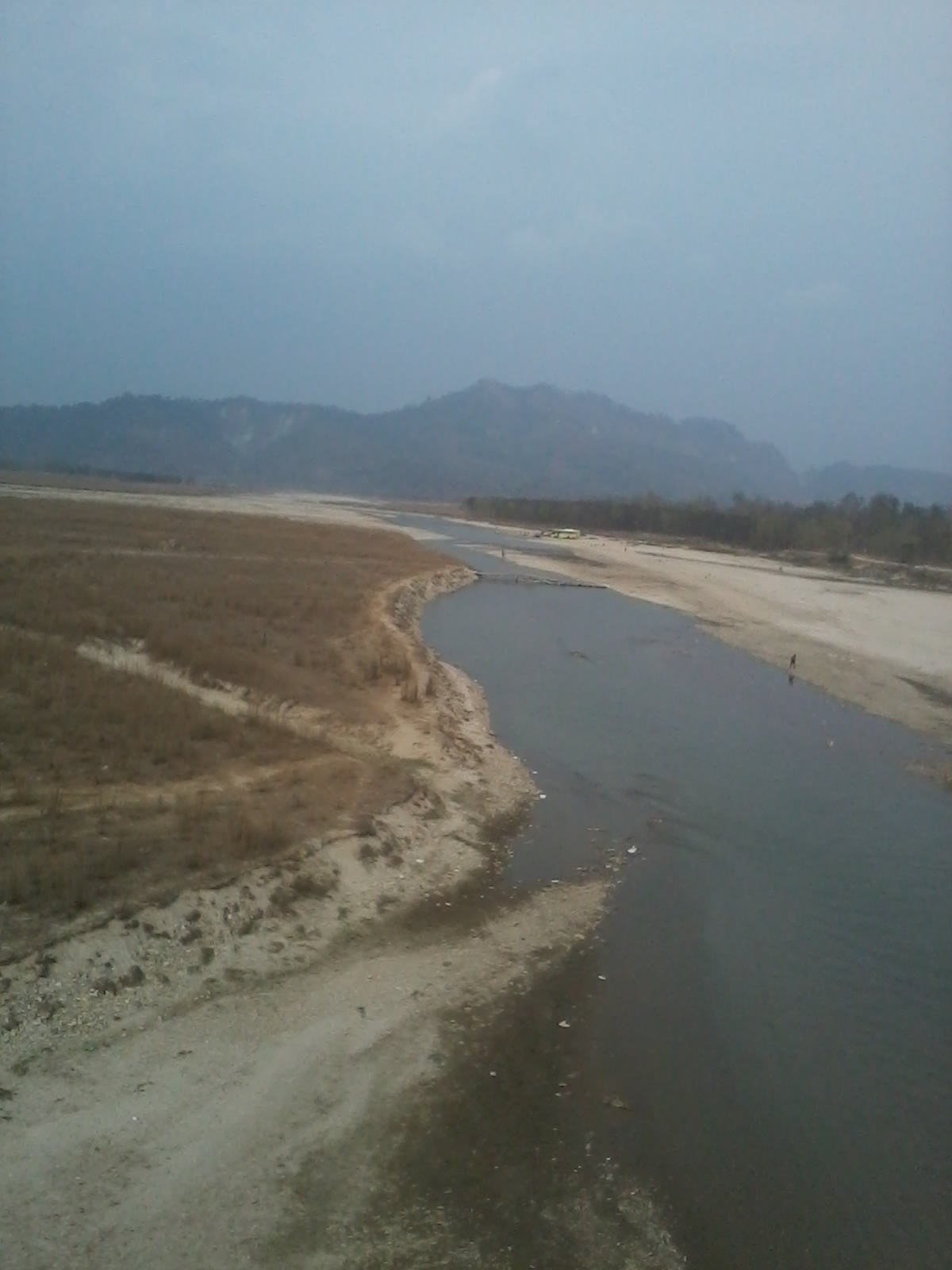

Location
- Country: Nepal

Physical characteristics
- Source: Mahabharat Lekh /Mai Pokhari Ilam Nepal
  - location: Nepal
- Mouth: Mahananda
  - coordinates: 25°52′59″N 87°47′53″E
- Length: 276 kilometres (171 mi)

Basin features
- Tributaries
  - right: Ratua Khola

The Kankai River (Nepali: कन्काई नदी, also referred to as Kankai Mai) is a trans-boundary river flowing through the hills of Ilam and the plains of the Jhapa District in Nepal. It begins at the confluence of the Mai Khola and Deb Mai Khola rivers.

The river overflows during monsoons, at times across thousands of hectares of fertile plains of Jhapa. The Kankai Irrigation Project, launched by the Nepalese government, irrigates southern Jhapa, including Shivganj, Pachgachi, and Mahavara.

The Kankai has several tourist hotspots along its course, such as in the areas of Domukha, Dhanuskoti, Chuli, Chepti, and Maipokhari. The Kotihom Surunga Municipality holds an annual Mai Mela fair on Magh 1 (January 14), where people from Jhapa, Morang, Ilam, and various parts of India come to enjoy and perform religious activities.

A holy river for many Hindus living nearby, the Kotihom (eastern) riverbank is a common site for death rituals. The cremation service Kankai Aryaghat was funded by public investment and built on the Kotihom bank of the river. It includes a river bridge that is 702 m (2,303 ft) long.

== Etymology ==
The river's name 'Kankai' is taken from the Sanskrit word kanaka (lit. 'gold'). One common myth holds that, many years ago, a saint living in the hill region near the river found golden stones in the river, and hence gave it its name. 'Kanakawati Mai', one of the river's alternate names, means 'Goddess of gold'.

== Course ==
The Kankai is a rainfed perennial river whose primary tributary, the Mai Khola, originates in the Mahabharat Range in Jaubari region of Eastern Nepal. It flows for 276 kilometres (171 mi) distance through Nepal and then through the Indian state of Bihar to join the Mahananda in Kishanganj district. The river has a drainage area of 1,148 square kilometres (443 sq mi).

The area has warm temperate rainy climates with mild winters. The upper part of the basin basically consists of granitic gneiss of Cambro-Ordovician age, and the lower part consists of Quaternary rocks. The Kankai is a gravelly river with more than 60% of its gravel being gneiss, and the rest consisting of different metamorphic and sedimentary rocks. The sediment yield of the river is estimated to be 148 thousand tons per year.

== Infrastructure ==
=== Irrigation system ===
The Kankai Irrigation Project was developed for the purpose of irrigating 8,000 hectares (20,000 acres) of agricultural land in Jhapa, a Terai district located at the southeastern corner of Nepal. Its command area is flanked by the Kankai River in the east, the Khrisna River in the west, the Mahendra Highway in the north, and the Indian border in the south.

==== Development ====
A detailed feasibility study of the project was completed in 1970 with technical assistance from the Asia Development Bank (ADB). The construction was carried out in two phases. The first phase was initiated in 1973 and completed in 1981 with substantial delays and cost overruns. The second phase, to irrigate an additional 3,000 hectares, started in 1980 and was completed in 1991, bringing only 2,000 hectares (4,900 acres) of land under irrigation. Thus, the total irrigation infrastructure developed is 7,000 hectares (17,000 acres) of land. The total cost of the project was NRs 310 million, 63 percent of which came from an ADB loan.

After the completion of the second phase of the project, financial assistance from ADB ceased and in 1993 the Kankai Development Board, formed in 1973 for the implementation of the construction works, was dissolved. Since then, the Kankai Irrigation Office, under the Department of Irrigation, has been responsible for the operation and maintenance of the system.

==== Structure ====
The diversion structure of the system is a 126-metre (413 ft) long, 1.85-metre (6 ft 1 in) tall, ogee-type, concrete weir constructed at the debouching point of the Kankai.

The canal system consists of a three-tier network of canals. The main canal is 34 kilometres (21 mi) long with 74 kilometres (46 mi) of secondary canals and 110 kilometres (68 mi) of tertiary canals. The first 11.5-kilometre (7.1 mi) section of the main canal is lined and has a design capacity of 10.15 m^{3}/s (358 cu ft/s); the other sections are unlined and their capacity decreases from 7.25 to 1.75 m^{3}/s (256 to 62 cu ft/s).

The density of structures in the system is quite high. The canal network crosses many flashy rivers, hence many cross-drain structures (siphons) have been built in the system. Steel gates have been built at all off-take points from the main canal and at all tertiary off-takes from secondary canals. The total number of such regulating structures is 322. Including all other subsidiary hydraulic structures, the structural density is as high as 0.2 per hectare.

The command area consists of flat land (average slope of 1/800) with fertile soil. The soil texture varies from loamy to sandy loam. Alluvial soils exist in most parts of the command area. Brown forest soil is found in the northern parts while paddy soil exists in the southern parts.

=== Embankments ===
The Kankai, flowing through the central part of the Jhapa District, is one of the perennial rivers. Erosion of banks and inundation during rains cause problems for the residents of its catchment area near Satasidham and Panchganchi village development committees. The protection works—being carried out with an assistance of NRs 2.67 crores from the Government of India—will help control flooding and protect valuable agricultural land inhabited by over 31,000 people along the banks of the catchment area. The project is being implemented by the Department of Water Induced Disaster Prevention, Ministry of Water Resources, Government of Nepal, with the participation of local users.

=== Kankai Multipurpose Project ===
The Kankai Multipurpose Project is proposed to be located in Jhapa and Ilam districts of Nepal. While the reservoir and its catchment lie in Ilam district, the irrigation command area is in Jhapa district. A net area of 67,450 hectares (166,700 acres) will be irrigated. The project includes a 38-megawatt power plant. The project is part of the Kosi–Mechi link. The project has been stalled because of objections from India.

== Culture ==
The Kankai River in Jhapa is a famous pilgrimage site, attracting devotees from Nepal and India. People worship this river as 'Kankai Mai', the 'Goddess of gold'. The western bank of this river is known as Maidhar and the eastern one is known as Kotihom. Kankai Mela, one of the biggest mela in eastern region, is held here every Maghe Sankranti, the first day of the tenth month Magh of the Nepali calendar.

== Gallery ==
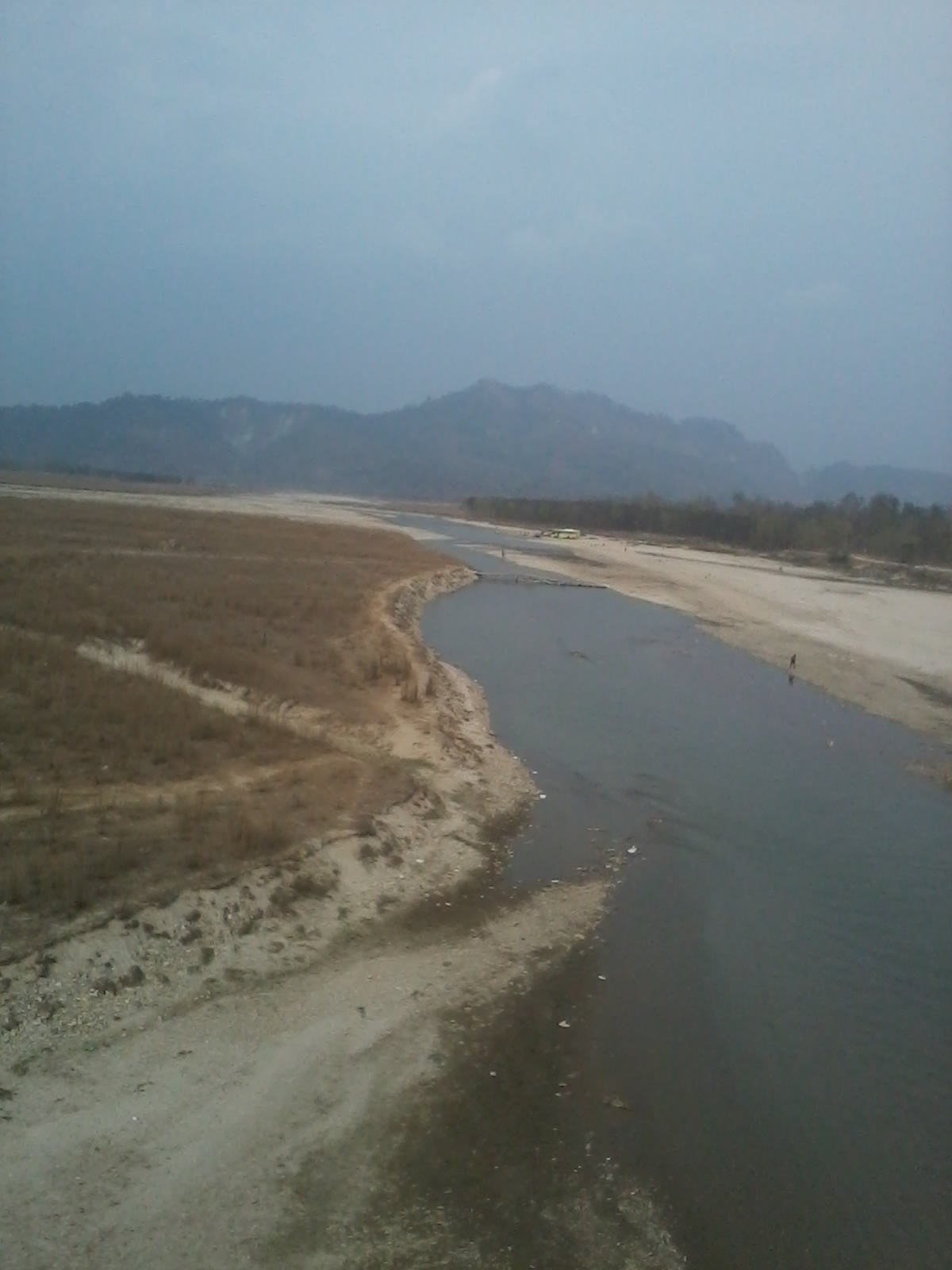

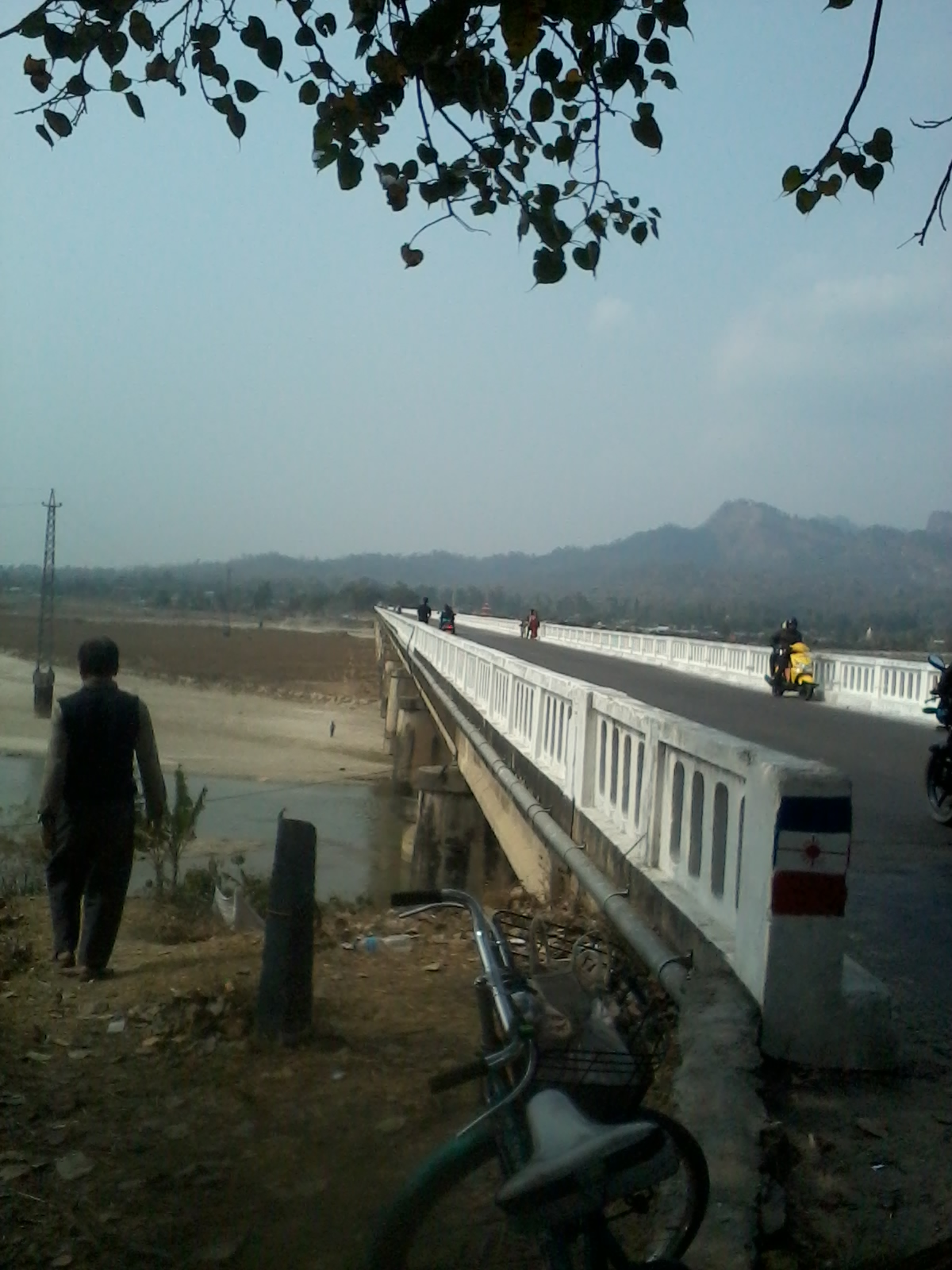

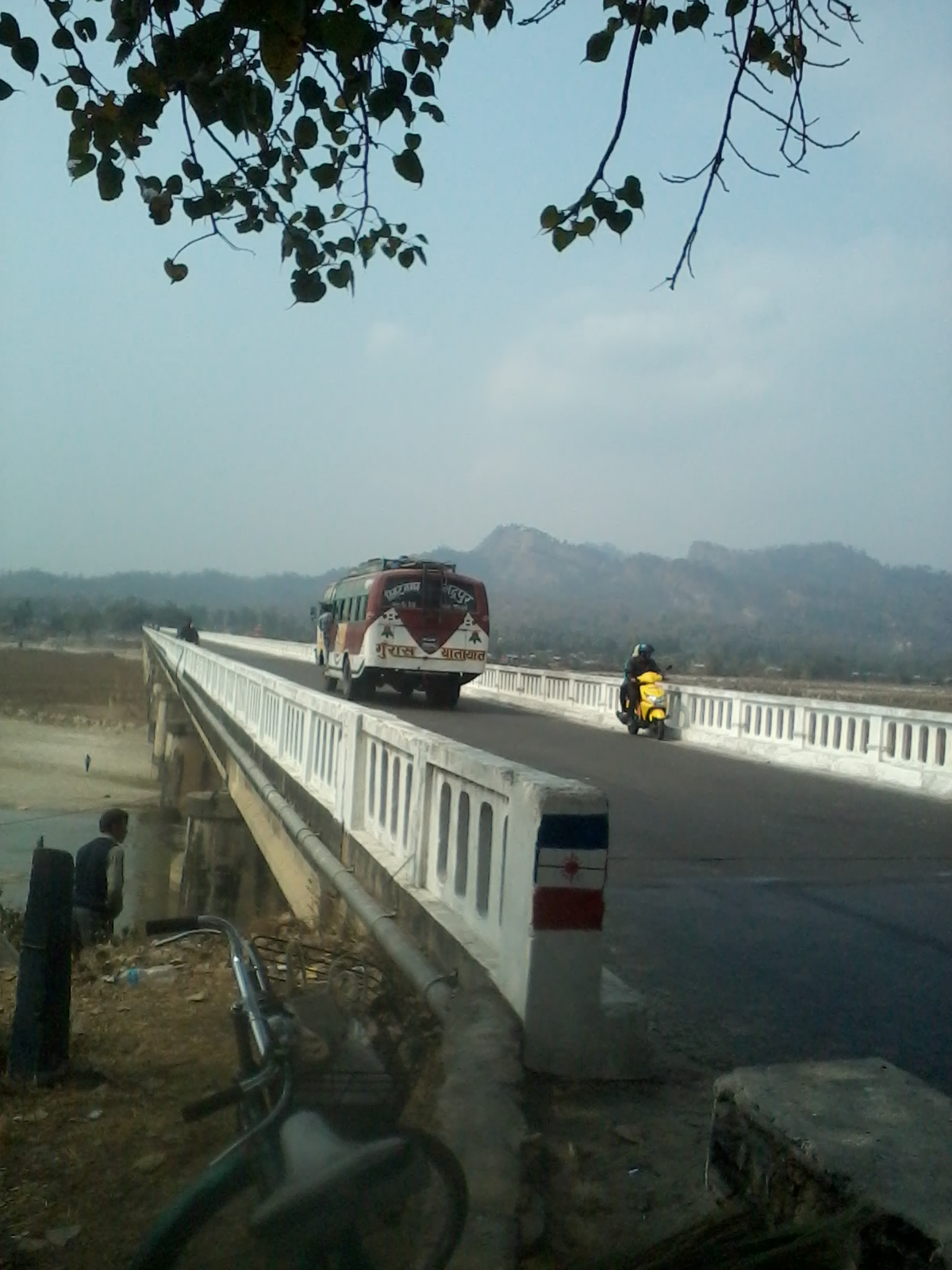

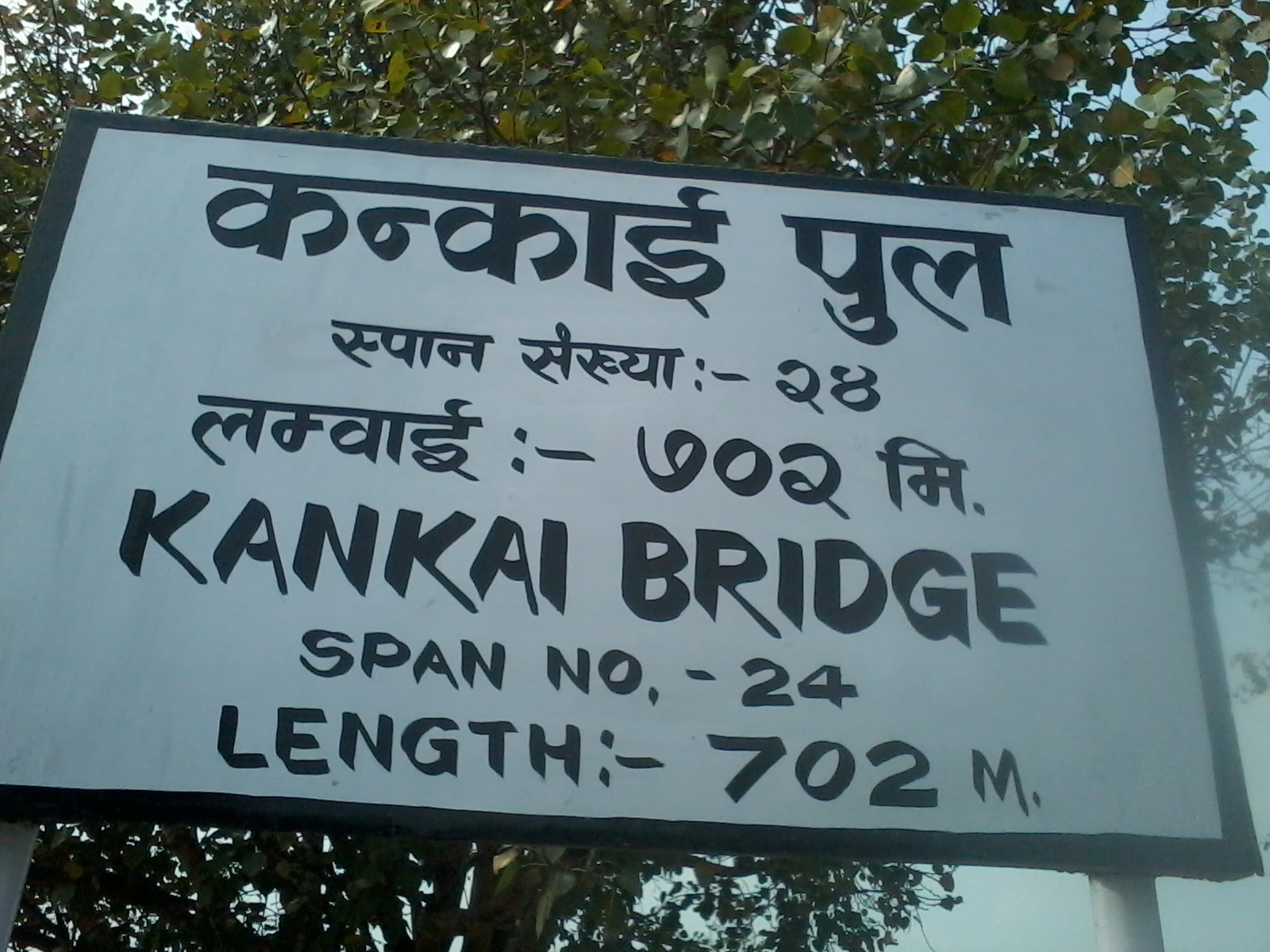
