= Molun Khola Small Hydropower Station =

Molun Khola SHP Hydropower Station
- Location within Nepal
- Official name: Molun Khola SHP Hydropower Project
- Country: Nepal
- Location: Okhaldhunga District
- Coordinates: 27°20′00″N 86°26′19″E
- Purpose: Power
- Status: Operational
- Owner: Molun Hydropower Co. Pvt. Ltd

Dam and spillways
- Type of dam: Gravity
- Impounds: Molun River

Power Station
- Commission date: 2074-12-12 BS
- Type: Run-of-the-river
- Installed capacity: 7 MW

Molun Khola Small Hydropower Station (Nepali: मोलुन खोला सानो जलविद्युत आयोजना) is a run-of-river hydro-electric plant located in Okhaldhunga District of Nepal. The flow from Molun River is used to generate 7 MW electricity. The plant is owned and developed by Molun Hydropower Co. Pvt. Ltd, an IPP of Nepal. The plant started generating electricity from 2074-12-12BS. The generation licence will expire in 2106-06-01 BS, after which the plant will be handed over to the government. The power station is connected to the national grid and the electricity is sold to Nepal Electricity Authority.

== See also ==
- List of power stations in Nepal
