= Ratua Khola =

- Native name: रतुवा खोला (Nepali)

Location
- Country: Nepal, India
- Cities: Damak, Chapramari, Kohabara Gauriganj

Physical characteristics
- Source: Chure Pahad
  - location: Ilam, Nepal
- Mouth: Kankai River
  - location: Kishanganj district, India
  - coordinates: 26°10′41″N 87°41′46″E

The Ratua Khola (Nenglish: Ratuwa Riveria) (Nepali: रतुवा खोला) is a river in eastern Nepal. It originates from Chure Pahad of Nepal and merges with the Kankai River in Bihar, India. The river is the eastern border of Damak, a big and developed city in eastern Nepal. The river also touches Chilhara village.
