= Upper Mai Hydropower Station =

- Location within Nepal
- Official name: Upper Mai Hydropower Project
- Country: Nepal
- Location: Ilam District
- Coordinates: 27°1′22″N 87°58′00″E
- Purpose: Power
- Status: Operational
- Owner: Mai Valley Hydropower P Ltd.

Dam and spillways
- Type of dam: Gravity
- Impounds: Mai River

Power Station
- Commission date: 2073-03-09 BS
- Type: Run-of-the-river
- Hydraulic head: 380.8 m (1,249 ft)
- Installed capacity: 12 MW

Upper Mai Hydropower Station (Nepali: माथिल्लो माई जलविद्युत आयोजना) is a run-of-river hydro-electric plant located in Ilam District of Nepal. The Mai River flow is used to generate 25 MW electricity. The gross head is 380.8 m and design flow is 3.88 m^{3}/s.

The plant is owned and developed by Mai Valley Hydropower P Ltd., an IPP of Nepal. The plant started generating electricity from 2073 to 2003-09 BS. The generation licence will expire in 2102-04-22 BS, after which the plant will be handed over to the government. The power station is connected to the national grid and the electricity is sold to Nepal Electricity Authority.

== See also ==
- List of power stations in Nepal
