= Irrigation in Nepal =

- Land area: 1,48,006.67 km^{2}
- Agricultural land: 27.84 % (41,210 km^{2})
- Cultivated area equipped for irrigation: 50% (approx.}
- Irrigated area: 18,000 km^{2}
- Systems: Surface irrigation: 11,340 km^{2}; Sprinkler irrigation: 0 km^{2}; Localized irrigation: 0 km^{2}
- Annual investment in irrigation: 256 million USD

Irrigation in Nepal plays a crucial role in supporting the country’s largely agriculture-based economy. Since most farming depends on monsoon rainfall, irrigation systems help ensure year-round crop production and reduce the risks caused by droughts or uneven rainfall. Nepal has several types of irrigation systems, including large-scale surface irrigation projects (like canals), groundwater irrigation (tube wells and shallow wells), traditional systems such as kulo (farmer-managed canals), and modern lift-irrigation systems. Major river basins—the Koshi, Gandaki, and Karnali—provide opportunities for large irrigation networks, while the Tarai region has the highest irrigation coverage due to flat terrain and groundwater availability. The hilly and mountainous regions rely more on small- and medium-scale farmer-managed systems. Although Nepal has expanded irrigation infrastructure over the years, challenges still remain, such as limited dry-season water availability, poor canal maintenance, sedimentation, and the impacts of climate change. Improving irrigation efficiency is essential for agricultural growth, food security, and rural livelihoods.

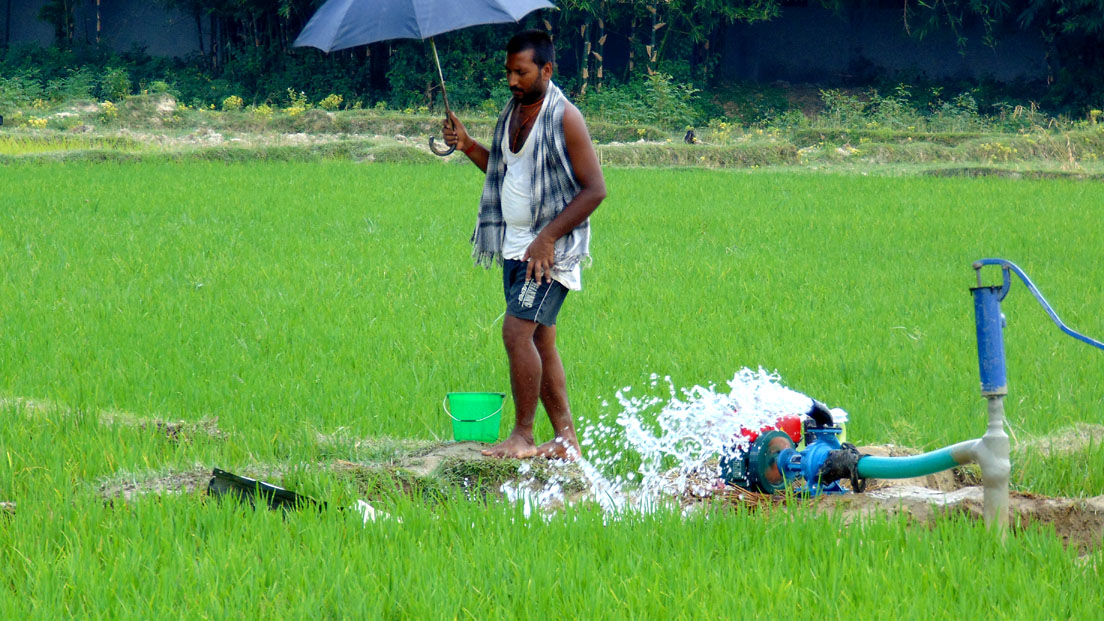
A farmer busy in supplying water to the crops with the help of water pump without considering the heat temperature.

Irrigation plays a critical role in Nepal's agriculture, which employs around 60–66% of the population and contributes nearly a quarter of the GDP.

Out of 2.7 million hectares of agricultural land in Nepal, only 1.3 Mha have irrigation facilities. The majority of irrigation systems are small and medium-scale.

A recent study funded by the Climate and Development Knowledge Network (CDKN) revealed that about 0.8% of agricultural GDP is being lost annually due to climate change and extreme events. There is a need to both improve agricultural productivity and make it more resilient to climate uncertainty and change in general. Recent increases in floods and droughts have raised concerns that the climate is changing rapidly and that existing arrangements for irrigation design and management may need to be reconsidered.

== History of Irrigation ==
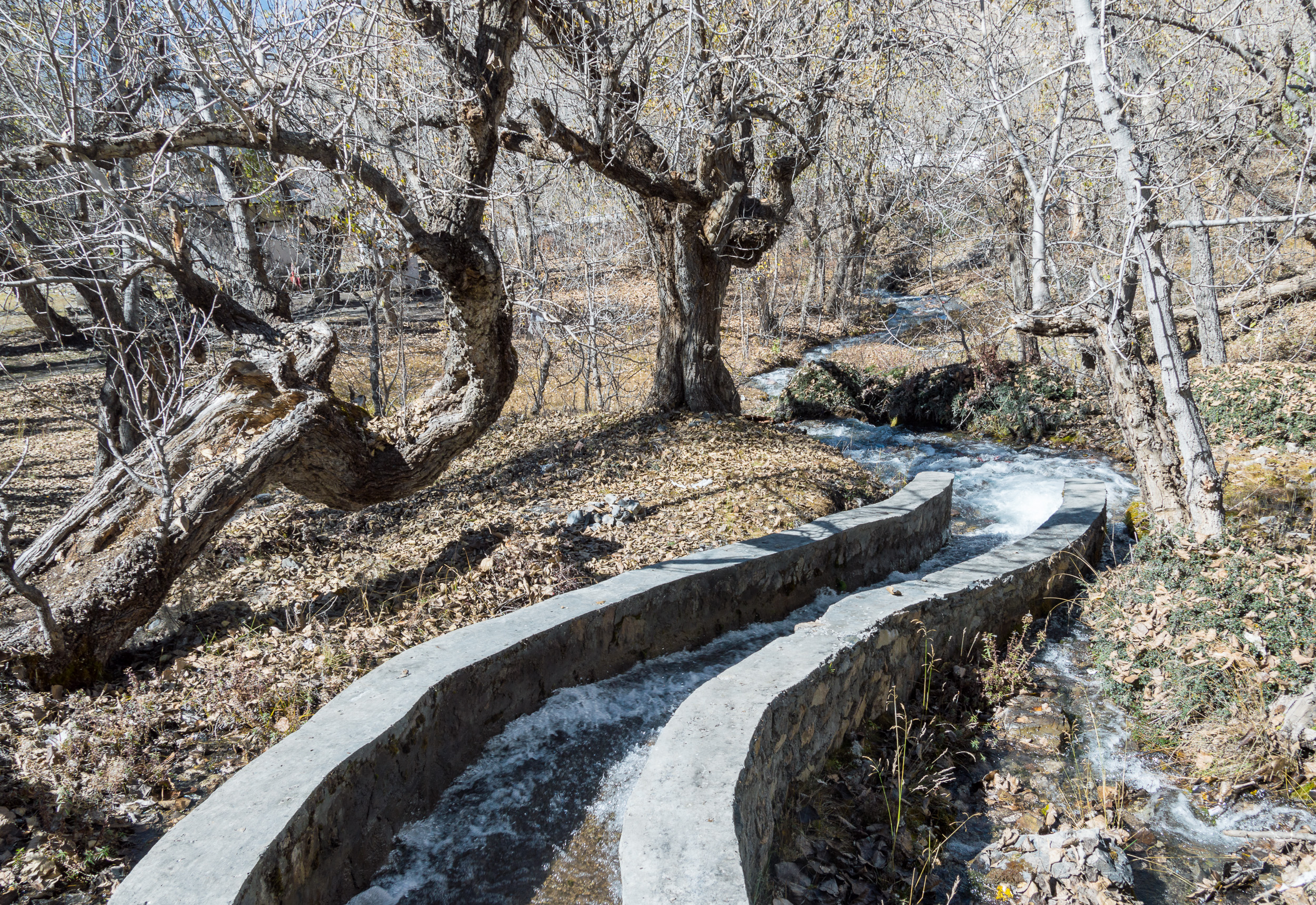
A canal in Muktinath similar to a rajkulo.

Irrigation in Nepal began in Sixth Century BC. Irrigation systems in mountain terraces were developed 400 years ago. There are about 20,000 (640,000 ha.) FMISs Modern irrigation systems development started since 1920.

Department of Irrigation was established in 2009 BS which later merged with Department of Water Induced Disaster Management in 2074 to form Department of Water Resources and Irrigation.

== Irrigation Projects ==
- Babai Irrigation Project
- Bheri Babai Diversion Multipurpose Project
- Mahakali Irrigation Project
- Rani Jamara Kulariya Irrigation Project
- Sikta Irrigation Project
- Sunkoshi Marin Diversion Project
- Sunsari–Morang Irrigation Project (SMIP) is the largest irrigation project in Nepal, whose command area is 68,000 ha.

== See also ==
- Rajkulo
- Dhunge dhara
- Department of Water Resources and Irrigation
