= Agriculture in Nepal =

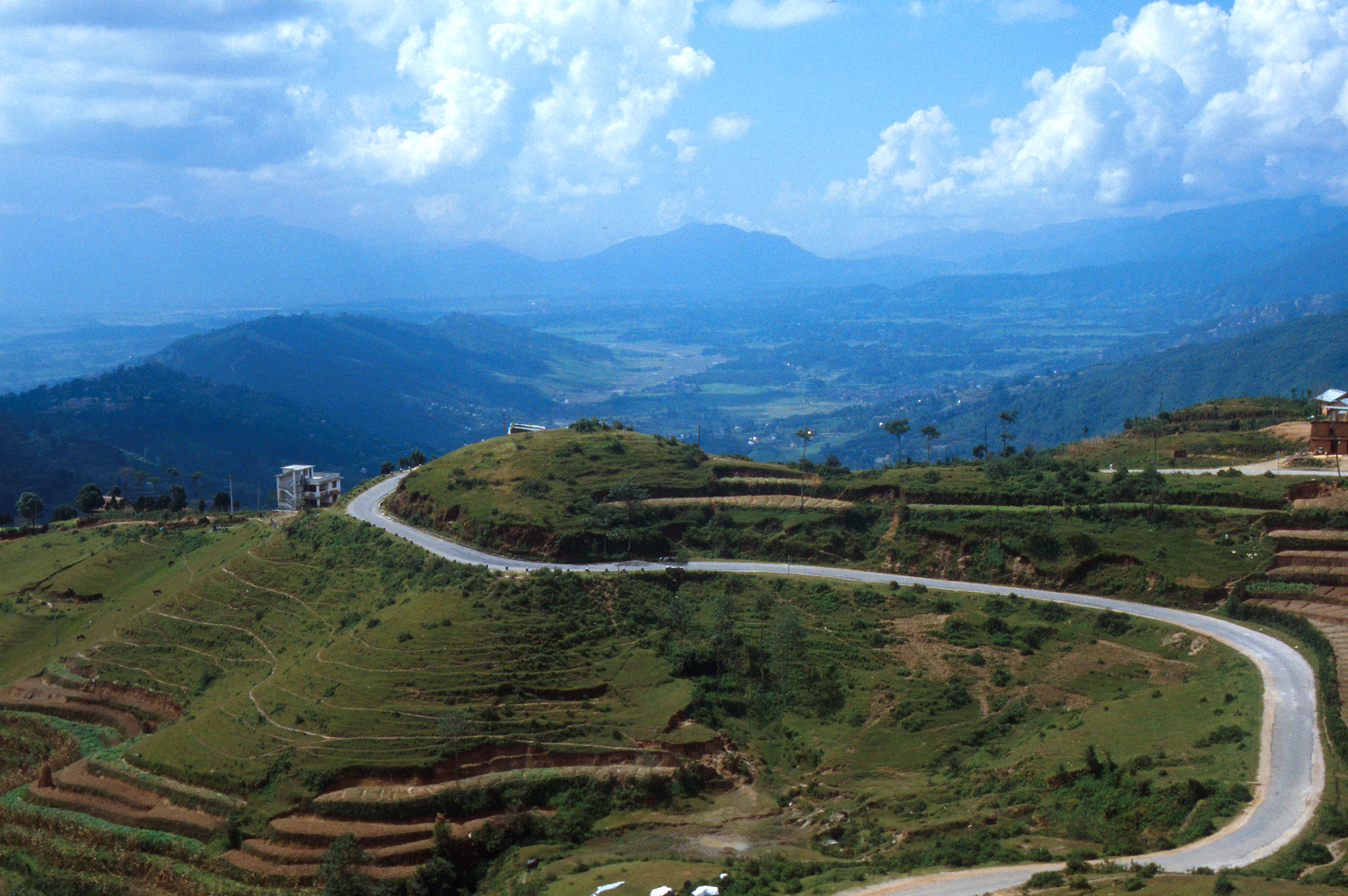
Terraced farming on the foothills of the Himalayas is a common sight in many villages in Nepal.

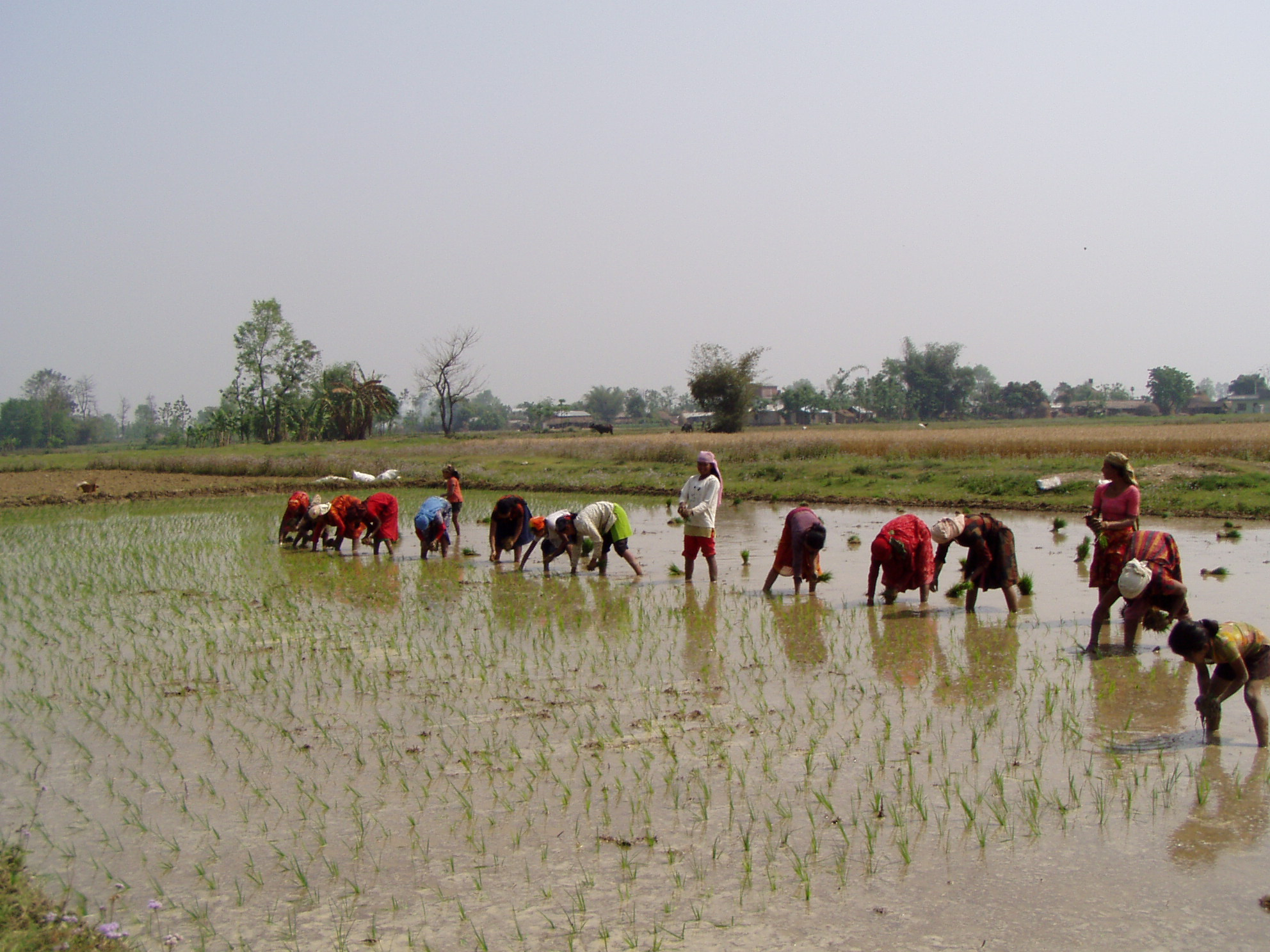
Nepalese women planting rice

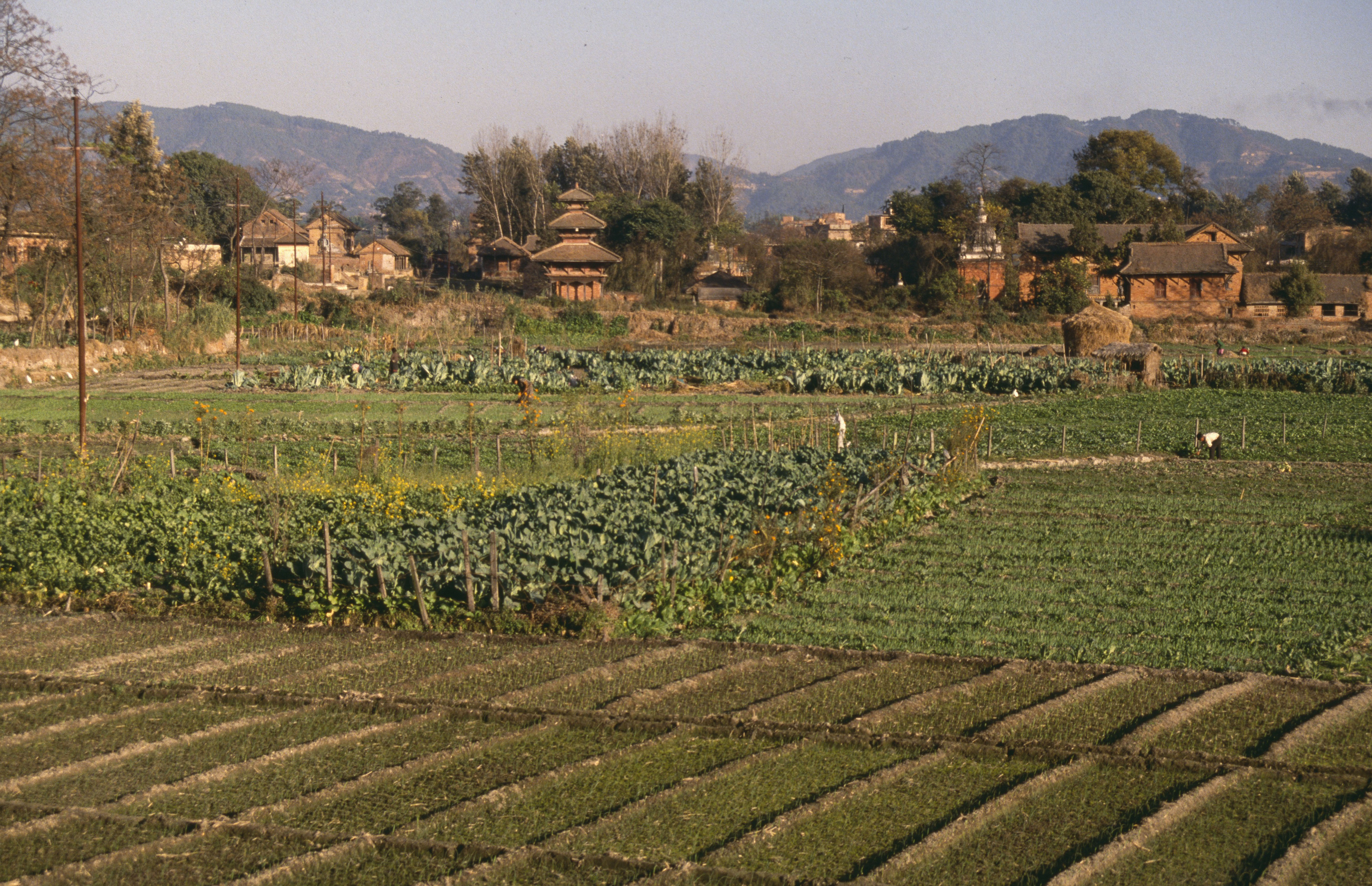
Cultivation in the Kathmandu Valley

In Nepal, the economy is dominated by agriculture. In the late 1980s, it was the livelihood for more than 90% of the population. Although only approximately 20% of the total land area was cultivable.

The agricultural sector has remained the backbone of the national economy. Agriculture contributes 21.6 percent to the Gross Domestic Product (GDP) and provides the main occupation for approximately 62.0 percent of households. About 67.0 percent of the total population resides within agricultural families. (Source: Economic Survey 2080/81).

Since the formulation of the Fifth Five-Year Plan (1975–80), agriculture has been the highest priority because of the dependence of economic growth on both increasing the productivity of existing crops and diversifying the agricultural base for use as industrial inputs.

According to the World Bank, agriculture is the main source of food, income, and employment for the majority of the population in Nepal. It provides about 21.6 % of the gross domestic product (GDP).

In trying to increase agricultural production and diversify the agricultural base, the government focused on irrigation, the use of fertilizers and insecticides, the introduction of new implements and new seeds of high-yield varieties, and the provision of credit. The lack of distribution of these inputs, as well as problems in obtaining supplies, however, inhibited progress. Although land reclamation and settlement were occurring in the Terai Region, environmental degradation and ecological imbalance resulting from deforestation also prevented progress.

Although new agricultural technologies helped increase food production, there still was room for further growth. Past experience indicated bottlenecks, however, in using modern technology to achieve a healthy growth. The conflicting goals of producing cash crops both for food and for industrial inputs also were problematic.

== History ==
The production of crops fluctuated widely as a result of these factors as well as weather conditions. Although agricultural production grew at an average annual rate of 2.4 percent from 1974 to 1989, it did not keep pace with population growth, which increased at an average annual rate of 2.6 percent over the same period. Further, the annual average growth rate of food grain production was only 1.2 percent during the same period.

There were some successes. Fertile lands in the Terai Region and hardworking peasants in the Hill Region provided greater supplies of food staples (mostly rice and corn), increasing the daily caloric intake of the population locally to over 2,000 calories per capita in 1988 from about 1,900 per capita in 1965. Moreover, areas with access to irrigation facilities increased from approximately 6,200 hectares in 1956 to nearly 583,000 hectares by 1990.

Rice is the most important cereal crop. In 1966 total rice production amounted to a little more than 1 million tons; by 1989 more than 3 million tons were produced. Fluctuation in rice production was very common because of changes in rainfall; overall, however, rice production had increased following the introduction of new cultivation techniques as well as increases in cultivated land. By 1988 approximately 3.9 million hectares of land were under paddy cultivation. Many people in Nepal devote their lives to cultivating rice to survive. In 1966 approximately 500,000 tons of corn, the second major food crop, were produced. By 1989 corn production had increased to over 1 million tons.

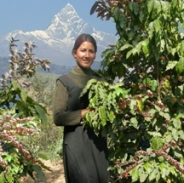
A Nepalese coffee grower

Other food crops included wheat, millet, barley, and coffee, but their contribution to the agricultural sector was small. Increased production of cash crops, used as input to new industries, dominated in the early 1970s. Sugarcane and tobacco also showed considerable increases in production from the 1970s to the 1980s. Potatoes and oilseed production had shown moderate growth since 1980. Medicinal herbs were grown in the north on the slopes of the Himalayas, but increases in production were limited by continued environmental degradation. According to government statistics, production of milk, meat, and fruit had improved but as of the late 1980s still had not reached a point where nutritionally balanced food was available to most people. Additionally, the increases in meat and milk production had not met the desired level of output as of 1989. Nepal has more than 50% of people engaged in agriculture. Food grains contributed 76 percent of total crop production in 1988–89. In 1989-90 despite poor weather conditions and a lack of agricultural inputs, particularly fertilizer, there was a production increase of 5 percent. In fact, severe weather fluctuations often affected production levels. Some of the gains in production through the 1980s were due to increased productivity of the work force (about 7 percent over fifteen years); other gains were due to increased land use and favorable weather conditions. According to Statistical Information on Nepalese Agriculture (2008–2009) only 65.6% of people depends on agriculture and 21% of land is cultivated whereas 6.99% of land is uncultivated.

== Production and trade ==
Nepal's ranking in agricultural productions (data in 2016)
Product name	Global rank
Black peppercorn	
Cashew nuts	
Coffee	
Coconut	
Rice, paddy	17
Rubber	
Sweet potatoes	
Tea	

== Irrigation ==
Out of 2.7 million hectares of agricultural land in Nepal, only 1.3 Mha have irrigation facilities. The majority of irrigation systems are small and medium-scale.

A recent study funded by the Climate and Development Knowledge Network (CDKN) revealed that about 0.8% of agricultural GDP is being lost annually due to climate change and extreme events. There is a need to both improve agricultural productivity and make it more resilient to climate uncertainty and change in general. Recent increases in floods and droughts have raised concerns that the climate is changing rapidly and that existing arrangements for irrigation design and management may need to be reconsidered.

Irrigation projects:

- Babai Irrigation Project
- Bheri Babai Diversion Multipurpose Project
- Mahakali Irrigation Project
- Rani Jamara Kulariya Irrigation Project
- Sikta Irrigation Project
- Sunkoshi Marin Diversion Project

== See also ==
- Economy of Nepal
- Beekeeping in Nepal
- Flax production in Nepal
- Walnut production in Nepal
- Chickpeas in Nepal
- Fertilizer use in Nepal
- Animal husbandry in Nepal
