= National Paddy Day =

Festival of Nepal

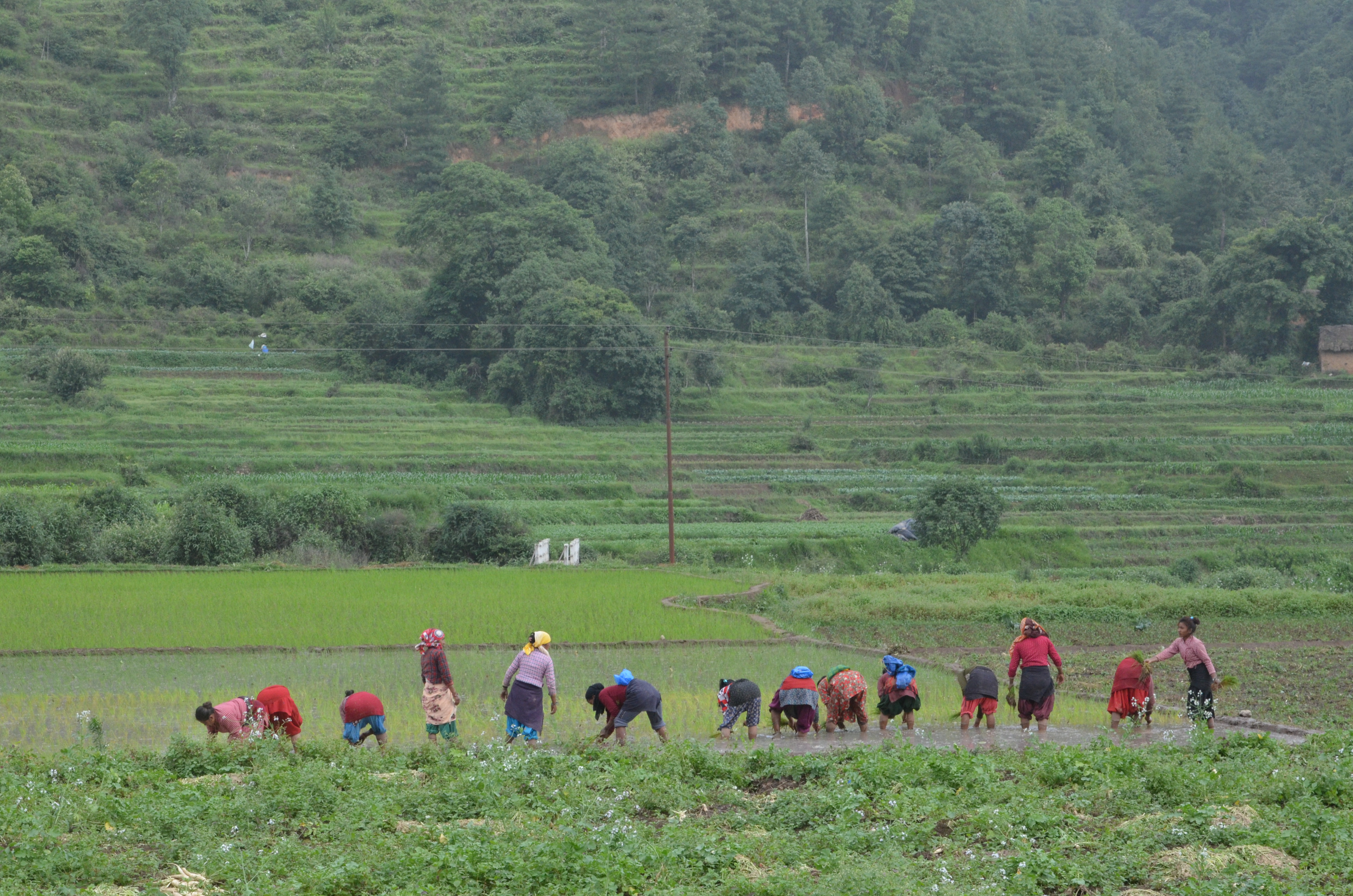
- Observed by: Nepal
- Type: National
- Date: 29 June (15 Asaar)
- Frequency: annual

National Paddy Day (Nepali: राष्ट्रीय धानरोपाई दिवस, romanized: Rastriya Dhanropai Diwas), or simply known as Asar 15 (Nepali: असार पन्द्र) is an annual festival in Nepal which marks the beginning of the rice planting season. It is celebrated on the 15th of Ashadh (29 June) every year. The festival is also named Ropain Diwas, Dhan Diwas, and Ashadh Pandra. It celebrates the fact that farmers have planted crops such as rice, lentils, and vegetables.

The festival usually starts with people parading through their villages before entering the rice fields. People wear Nepali traditional clothes. According to OnlineKhabar, "Particular responsibilities are shared among men and women. Men plough the field, arrange drain water, level the fields and make fine mud slurry for the plantation". Participants splash water at each other, play in the mud, plant rice seedlings, eat the traditional dish of curd and beaten rice, and sing folk songs. Some communities schedule related cultural programs.

The festival is also popular among tourists who visit Nepal, and hence this festival also forms a part of agrotourism.

== History and significance ==
According to the cultural norm, 15 Ashadh is "considered as the auspicious day to start rice planting for the year". The date falls during the monsoon season, an optimal time for rice planting. On 14 December 2004, the Nepal Government officially declared Ashadh 15 as National Paddy Day. The celebration takes place under the theme of "Increase rice production for self-sufficiency and prosperity".

The Provincial Assembly of Karnali Province has declared Ashadh 15 to be a public holiday in Karnali Province except for the Jumla District; paddy planting starts on 25 March in Jumla.

Rice contributes to about 7 percent of Nepal's GDP. In 2018, it was estimated that Nepal imports about Rs 25 billion worth of rice.

== Foods ==
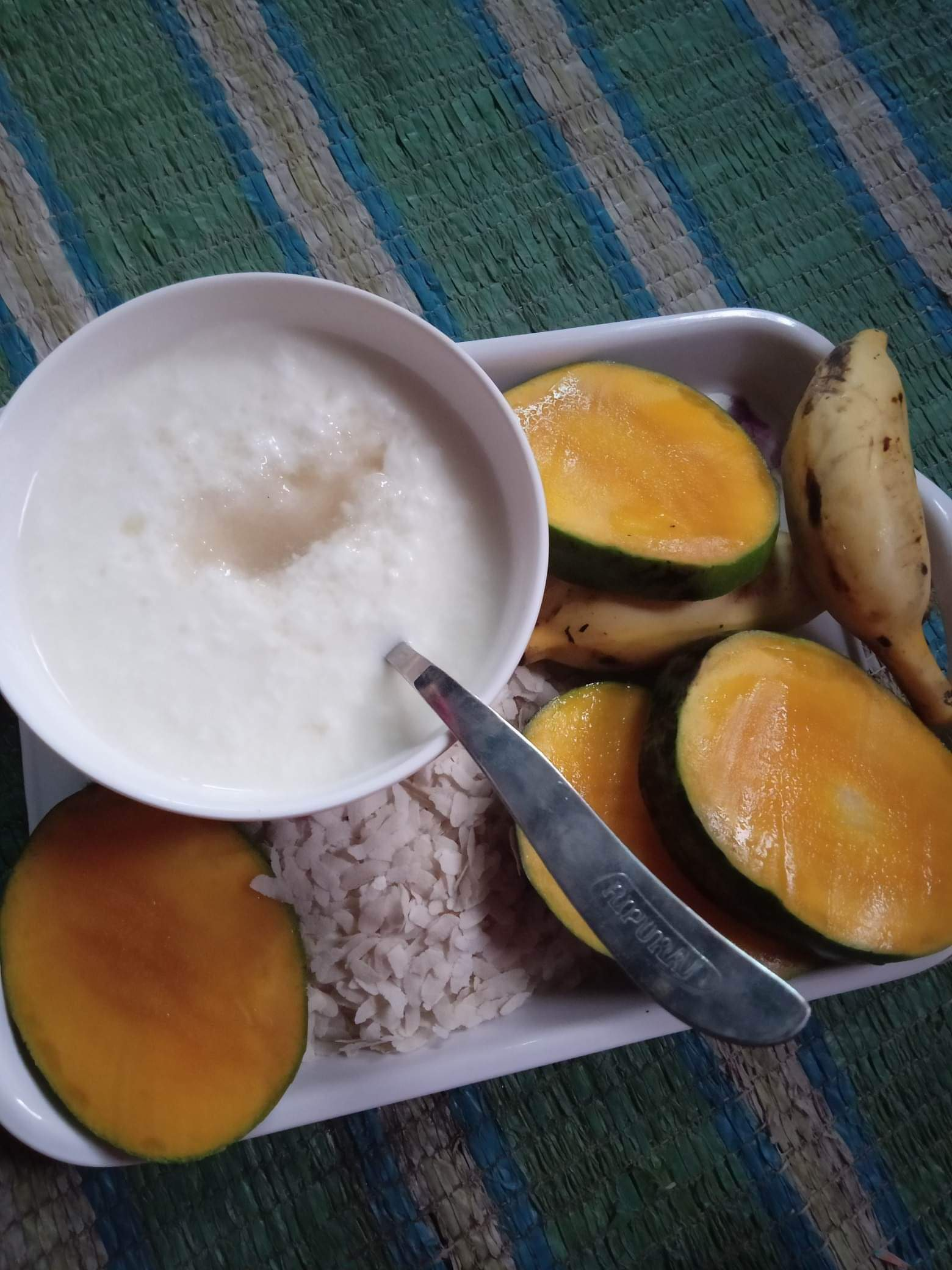
Curd, beaten rice, and fruit served on National Paddy Day

Curd and beaten rice are traditionally consumed on National Paddy Day. Yogurt is also served.

== Major developments ==
A survey by The Himalayan Times in 2020 reported that in many remote areas of Nepal, children were not aware of the festival. In 2020, it was reported that the festival celebration was stale because of the fear of the COVID-19 pandemic and locust infestation.

== See also ==
- Agriculture in Nepal
- List of festivals in Nepal
- National Education Day (Nepal)
