= Centre of Hydrology and Water Resources Research =

Centre of Hydrology & Water Resources Research
- जल विज्ञान तथा जलस्रोत अनुसन्धान केन्द्र

Agency overview
- Formed: 2026; 0 years ago
- Type: Research and forecasting of Water Resources
- Jurisdiction: Government of Nepal
- Status: Active
- Headquarters: Babarmahal, Kathmandu, Nepal
- Director General responsible: Dr. Sanjeev Baral
- Parent department: Ministry of Energy, Water Resources and Irrigation
- Website: www.wrerc.gov.np

Centre of Hydrology & Water Resources Research (Nepali: जल विज्ञान तथा जलस्रोत अनुसन्धान केन्द्र) is a governmental organization under Water and Energy Commission Secretariat. Its mainly works by that studies Nepal's water, rivers, floods, glaciers, groundwater, etc. It also provides data, research and forecasting services related to water resources.

== History ==
History of the Centre of Hydrology and Water Resources Research in Nepal dates back to 1961, when the Water Survey Unit was established under the Electricity Department. It was later upgraded into different water-survey and hydrology-related institutions, eventually becoming the Department of Hydrology and Meteorology in 1993. Separately, Water Resources Research and Development Center was established in 2017. It was restructured as the Water Resources and Energy Research Center in 2025. Finally, in 2026 hydrology-related functions were integrated with this research center to establish the present Centre of Hydrology and Water Resources Research under the Water and Energy Commission Secretariat.

== Organization ==
The department and its branch offices are run by officers of Nepal Engineering Service (Civil/Hydrology). It has 4 regional offices and several field offices for different river systems. A few other projects also run under the department.

- Hydrology Office, Dharan
- Hydrology Office, Pokhara
- Hydrology Office, Kohalpur
- Hydrology Office, Attariya

== See also ==
- Department of Water Resources and Irrigation
- Department of Electricity Development
