= Foreign aid to India =

The Indian government receives foreign aid from various nations and international organisations.

== Aid received ==
In 2010, British newspaper The Guardian reported the aid received by India to be less than 1% of its GDP and that India has declined to take foreign aid recently.

The United States Agency for International Development (USAID) compiled and published a data in 2015 indicating that from the period 1946-2012, India has been the recipient of highest aid from United States. The amount of economic aid, adjusted to inflation then, was reported to be USD 65.1 billion.

In 2021, the Indian government stated that it had received help from 52 nations during the second wave of COVID-19. Countries that provided aid to India during the second wave of COVID-19 included France, China, Ireland, the United States, Thailand, United Arab Emirates, Australia, Bhutan and others. In 2023, the USAID stated that it had donated US$200 million for India's COVID-19 relief.

In 2025, the US mission in India began reviewing their grants to comply with the executive orders passed by President Donald Trump that suspended all foreign aid.

== See also ==
- Indian foreign aid
- Indo-Norwegian Project
