= Water and Energy Commission Secretariat =

- जल तथा ऊर्जा आयोगको सचिवालय

Secreteriat overview
- Formed: 1975; 51 years ago
- Type: Water and energy resources development
- Jurisdiction: Government of Nepal
- Status: Active
- Headquarters: Pulchwok, Lalitpur, Nepal
- Secretary responsible: Sarju Kumar Baidya
- Parent department: Ministry of Energy, Water Resources and Irrigation
- Website: www.wecs.gov.np

Water and Energy Commission Secretariat (Nepali: जल तथा ऊर्जा आयोगको सचिवालय) is a commission under Ministry of Energy, Water Resources and Irrigation. Its mainly works under sector of developing the water and energy resources in an integrated and accelerated manner.

== History ==
Government of Nepal established WEC in 1975 which was renamed to Water and Energy Commission Secretariat in 1981. The primary objective of WECS is to help in the formulation of policies and planning of projects in the water and energy resources sector.

== Organization ==
The department and its branch offices are run by officers of Nepal Engineering Service (Civil/Irrigation/Hydropower/Hydrology). The commission has 3 offices for different river systems as well as one central agency for hydrological and water resources research. A few other projects also run under the department.

- Centre of Hydrology and Water Resources Research
  - Hydrology Office, Dharan
  - Hydrology Office, Pokhara
  - Hydrology Office, Kohalpur
  - Hydrology Office, Attariya
- Koshi River Basin Office, Biratnagar
- Gandaki River Basin Office, Chitwan
- Karnali River Basin Office, Surkhet

== See also ==
- Department of Water Resources and Irrigation
- Department of Electricity Development
