= National Education Day =

National Education Day can refer to:

- Education and Sharing Day
- National Education Day (India)
- National Education Day (Indonesia)
- National Education Day (Nepal)
- MasterCard Money Matters National Education Day, part of National Payroll Week

== See also ==
- Teachers' Day
