= Fertiliser use in Nepal =

Agriculture is the main GDP contributor to the economy of Nepal and fertilisers play a vital role. The annual average fertiliser requirement in Nepal to replenish the soil nutrition is 310 kg per hectare but only 29 kg of fertiliser is added to the soil. Fifty per cent of nutrient loss from the soil occurs during the early monsoon.

The use of fertiliser is relatively new to Nepal. Up to the 1950s, chemical fertilisers were not used in Nepal and all fertilizers were organic, produced locally. Currently, both organic and chemical fertilisers are used.

== Organic fertilisers ==
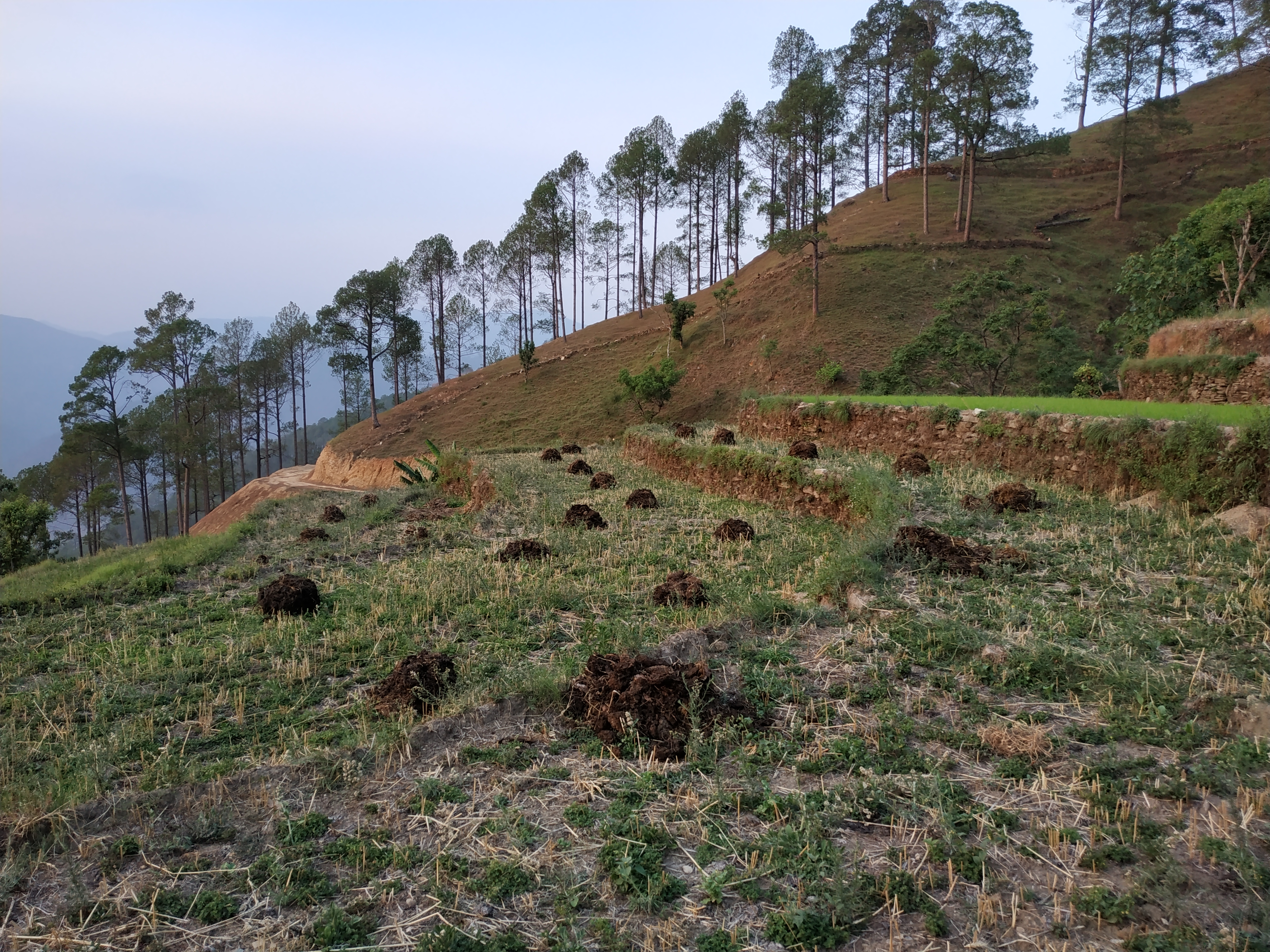
Cow manure used as organic fertiliser in hilly region

Organic fertilisers are produced locally by recycling agricultural waste and animal waste. In hilly farms, compost and farm yard manure are the traditional sources of fertiliser. The Government supports the use of organic fertiliser. It has adopted a policy to promote organic fertilisers. The Ministry of Agriculture provides a subsidy to the farmers purchasing the organic fertilisers at a rate of NPR 10 per kg or 50% of the sales price whichever is low. Similarly, the organic fertilisers production plant is also subsidised by providing 50% of the cost.

There are 25 centres that produce organic fertilisers with a total annual capacity of 100,600 MT (2015 AD). Some of the major ones are listed in the table. Besides, some portion of inorganic fertilizer is imported from abroad.

Major Organic fertiliser Producers of Nepal
Name	Capacity (MT/year)
Manakamana Agritech Pvt. Ltd, Chitwan	30,000
Unique Bio Tech Organic Pvt. Ltd, Chitwan	20,000
Buddha Organic fertiliser Industry, Dhanusa	10,000
Janakpur fertilisers Industries, Morang	10,000
Annapurna Agriculture fertiliser Industry, Morang	10,000
Nepal Integrated Model Agro Firm Pvt. Ltd, Kavrepalanchowk	5,000

== Chemical fertilisers ==
The use of chemical fertiliser is relatively new in Nepal. In the 50s, a small quantity of ammonium sulphate used to be imported from India. It was followed by importing from Russia by the National Trading Limited (a government agency) up to the mid-sixties To facilitate the import and distribution of fertilisers, Agriculture Inputs Corporation (AIC) was established under the Ministry of Agriculture in 1966.

In 1974, the government subsidized the fertiliser to some selected high hills and mid-hills districts due to price rise in the international market. However, the local price was still set 15-20% higher than the neighbouring country (India) to discourage outflow of fertilisers from Nepal. Germany, Canada, Japan and Finland in the late 60s started providing chemical fertiliser to Nepal in the form of aid. However, this did not continue long. By the 1990s only a few countries were providing the fertilizer aid.

In 1997, the government started deregulating the subsidy on fertilisers. By 1999, the subsidy was completely removed from all kinds of fertilisers. This removed the monopoly of AIC and the private sector started to compete in the fertiliser market. To institutionalize the deregulation policy, and to regulate the business under the policy, the government promulgated Fertiliser Control Order in 1999. In 2002, a National Fertiliser Policy was formulated and AIC was divided into two new organization viz. Agriculture Inputs Company Limited (AICL) responsible for fertiliser business and 2) National Seed Company Limited (NSCL). The fertiliser policy was considered to focus on supplying high-quality and affordable fertiliser to farmers.

In November 2008 the government again started to subsidise fertilisers (both organic and chemical) and it was endorsed on 25 March 2009.

=== Production and import ===
As of 2020, chemical fertilisers are not produced in Nepal. They are imported mostly from or through India. In the 1980s, there were plans to build the plant and feasibility study were carried out, but the plans have not been implemented. The import of chemical fertilisers (in MT) is shown in the bar-chart.

=== Types of chemical fertilisers ===
Mainly seven types of chemical fertilisers are used in Nepal. These are Urea, Diammonium Phosphate (DAP), Murate of Potash (MOP), Ammonium Sulphate (AS), Single Super Phosphate (SSP), Ammonium Phosphate Sulphate (APS) and NPK. The use of chemical fertilisers has an increaseing trend. Among them, Urea and DAP is the most used ones.

== Quality ==
The fertiliser supplied by informal and illegal sources (mainly from china) is considered to have poor quality. Some private traders were found to repack the low-quality imported fertilisers into popular brands.

== See also ==
- Agriculture in Nepal
