= National Pride Projects =

Nepali Government infrastructure projects

National Pride Projects are a set of infrastructure projects by the government of Nepal based on the proposal by the National Planning Commission.

== Projects ==
Irrigation Projects (6)

- Babai Irrigation Project
- Bheri Babai Diversion Multipurpose Project
- Mahakali Irrigation Project
- Rani Jamara Kulariya Irrigation Project
- Sikta Irrigation Project
- Sunkoshi Marin Diversion Project

Hydroelectric Project (3)

- Budhigandaki Hydroelectric Project
- Upper Tamakoshi Hydroelectric Project
- West Seti Hydropower Project

International Airports (3)

- Gautam Buddha International Airport
- Pokhara International Airport
- Nijgadh International Airport

Tourism (2)

- Pashupati Area Development Project
- Lumbini Area Development Project

Transport (7)

- Mid-Hills Pushpalal Highway
- Terai Hulaki Marg
- North-South Koshi Corridor
- North-South Kaligandaki Corridor
- North-South Karnali Corridor
- Kathmandu-Terai Expressway
- East-West Railway

Sports (4)

- Gautam budha international Cricket stadium
- Mulpani Cricket Stadium
- Girija Prasad Koirala Cricket Stadium
- Tribhuvan University Stadium

Others (2)

- Melamchi Water Supply Project
- President Chure-Terai Madhesh Conservation Area Program

== Progress ==
- Progress 2015
- Progress 2020
