= Rani Jamara Kulariya Irrigation Project =

Rani Jamara Kulariya Irrigation Project is one of the National Pride Projects of Nepal located in Kailali district. The intake of the project is located in Chisapani in the Karnali River. The project has an incremental history with multiple phases. The first initiation was done in 1953BS by Rani Padam Kumari Shah with a command area of 4,000 ha which was named Rani kulo pranali. The command area was increased by 3700 ha in 1960 BS by Dhundi Raj Sahi that was named Jamara kulo pranali. In 1972BS, 3300 ha was added by Madhu Mahato with name of Kulriya kulo pranali. The project was included National Pride Project in 2066 BS. with an aim to develop canal system to cover a command area of 20,300 ha. along with the construction of an agricultural road.

The project is funded by the Nepal Government and the World Bank. The project is scheduled to be completed in 2023.

== Project Components ==
The project has three components:

1. Development of irrigation system that aims to construct the infrastructure such as intake, canal, roads, bridges, environmental management and consultancy services for public. The cost of this component is about 52.9 M USD.
2. The second component of the project is to reinforce the agriculture sector by providing training and education to farmer. The cost of this component is 13.4 M USD.
3. The third component is the management of project for which 5.5 M USD has been allocated.

== Major infrastructures ==
The project has following civil infrastructures:

- Kuleria channel development
- Jamara channel development
- Rani channel development
- 37 head regulators
- 143 hume pipe culvert
- 134 box culverts
- 220 vertical drop structures
- 21 outlets
- 53 aqueducts
- 3 Bridges
- 1 Siphon crossing

== Impact ==
- According to statistics released by the agriculture office, the paddy production has increased to 3.8 tonnes/ha from the national average of 3.5 tonnes/ha.

== See also ==
- Ministry of Irrigation (Nepal)
- Department of Water Resources and Irrigation
- Agriculture in Nepal
