= Indian foreign aid =

Foreign Indian aid that was given by the government of India

Indian foreign aid is the aid given by the Indian government to other governments. India's major quantum of foreign aid is given to neighbouring countries. Since 2000, the Indian government has provided financial assistance worth $48 billion to over 65 countries. The amount comprised $14.74 billion in grants, $32.6 billion in concessional lines of credit and $656 million in capacity building and training programs. For the year 2025, India planned on providing developmental grants worth of ₹6,750 crore (US$710 million) to several developing countries and it included a notable increase in allocation for countries in Africa. That apart, concessional lines of credit and other developmental assistance are provided throughout the year and are not included as part of the initial budget. India has set up 'Indian Agency for Partnership in Development' as a part of Ministry of External Affairs (India) to channelize aid to recipient nations.

An American social enterprise, Devex reported in 2013 that India has spent US$1 billion on foreign aid in 2012–13. Since 2009, the foreign aid had increased around 3.2 times annually. In 2017, the government declared that India had been a net donor in 2015–16. In the Indian Government budget of year 2019-2020 USD 1.32 billion (INR 8415 crore) were allocated (0.3% of the overall budget) for India's foreign aid programme . Indian aid receiving countries are Bhutan, Nepal, Afghanistan, Mauritius, Seychelles, Maldives, African nations, Caribbean nations and a few Eastern European nations. Over the years India has funded several infrastructure, development and other projects in many countries worth billions of USD.

== Statistics ==
Year	Amount USD (in million)	Source
2009-10	442	Devex
2010-11	563	Devex
2011-12	646	Devex
2012-13	1,020	Devex

India’s ‘Aid to Countries’ under Budget 2024
Aid to Countries	Budget 2023-2024 (in ₹ crore)	Revised 2023-2024 (in ₹ crore)	Budget 2024-2025 (in ₹ crore)
Bhutan	2,400.58	2,398.97	2,068.56
Afghanistan	200	220	200
Bangladesh	200	130	120
Nepal	550	650	700
Sri Lanka	150	60	245
Maldives	400	770.90	400
Mongolia	7	5	5
African Countries	250	180	200
Eurasian Countries	75	20	20
Latin American Countries	50	32	30
Other Developing Countries	150	95	125
Disaster Relief	5	55	10
Chabahar Port	100	100	100
Mauritius	460.79	330	370
Seychelles	10	9.91	40

== History ==
India's foreign aid program began in the 1950s through the Colombo Plan. Although India's contributions through the Colombo Plan were small, it was still the fifth highest contributor to the Plan and the highest contributor among developing countries. Nepal was the largest recipient of Indian aid. Nepal and Bhutan were the first countries to receive aid from India. In 1958, India committed to providing $100 million multi-year grants to Nepal and also extended a ₹20 crore (equivalent to ₹19 billion or US$200 million in 2023) loan to Myanmar.

== Africa ==
In May 2011, India pledged $5 billion to African countries, following an injection of $5.4bn in 2008 for infrastructure development. In 2015, Prime Minister Narendra Modi announced $600m (£393m) in assistance for development projects in Africa at an India-Africa Forum Summit attended by 50 African nation in October 2015 in New Delhi. PM Modi announce a concessional credit of $10 billion to Africa that included Nigeria and 50000 scholarships to African students at the India-Africa Forum Summit in 2015. India's line of credit to Africa is close to $9 billion, with projects taking up $7.4 billion. India sent a grant of $100 million to UN to fight Ebola and another $20 million bilaterally to Guinea to tackle the disease.

India was the first Asian country to become a member of the Africa Capacity Building Foundation (ACBF). Between 2002 and 2021, India provided over US$11 billion in the form of aid and grants to African countries. India donated 150 metric tons of medical aid to 25 African countries, and supplied over 24.7 million doses of COVID vaccines to 42 countries in Africa as of February 2021.

In May 2017, India and Japan proposed a plan to build an Asia-Africa Growth Corridor (AAGC) to boost in economic development in region.

== Asia ==
=== South Asia and neighbouring countries ===
==== Nepal ====
India has aided many hydro-electric power plants in Nepal like Pardi, Trishuli and Devighat. As of 2014, under foreign direct investment, India plans to fund two hydel projects of Upper Karnali and Arun III. India's aid to Nepal was $142 million this year.

==== Sri Lanka ====
Also in November 2019 PM Modi offers $450 million development, anti-terror aid to Sri Lanka. In all, over $15 billion has been given to other Asian countries, mostly focusing on India's immediate neighbours for infrastructural development.

==== Afghanistan ====
India provided over $3 billion of aid to the former Islamic Republic of Afghanistan and was involved in over 400 projects across 34 provinces. These included several major infrastructure projects such as the Salma Dam, the Zaranj-Dalaram Highway, the Afghan Parliament building, restoration of the Stor Palace. India also helped build infrastructure such as roads, dams, electricity transmission lines and substations, solar panels, schools, and hospitals.

The Afghan-India Friendship Dam (also called Salma Dam) started construction in 1976 but was halted due to political instability. The project resumed work in 2014 and the dam was inaugurated in 2016. India's funds for the dam were nearly US$290–300 million. In May 2011, India pledged $500m to Afghanistan in addition to its existing commitment of $1.5bn, acquiring considerable goodwill in that country.

== Americas and Caribbean ==
India, in September 2019 announced $14 million grant for community development projects in the Caribbean Islands and expressed support to specialized capacity building courses for professionals in these Caribbean nations. In 2019 India offered aid to hurricane-devastated Caribbean nations through the Indian Mission at the UN and with partners in Antigua and Barbuda as well as Dominica and others an amount of $2 million from the India-UN Partnership Fund for South-South Cooperation for rehabilitation in Caricom. Caricom is an organisation of 15 Caribbean nations and their dependencies.

== Other assistance ==
Apart from financial aids, India has also provided helps in terms of manpower and other supplies to needy disaster struck countries. Post Hurricane Katrina in 2005, Indian Air Force aircraft provided 25 tonnes of relief supplies at the Little Rock Air Force Base in Arkansas. It extended similar support post the 2008 Sichuan earthquake in China.
