= Khalte =

Khalte खाल्टे Phyakse
- Village development committee
- Location in Nepal
- Coordinates: 27°50′N 84°18′E
- Country: Nepal
- Zone: Bagmati Zone
- District: Dhading District
- Established: 1850

Government
  - Type: Local Government
  - Ward Chairperson: Ram Bahadur Shrestha

Population (2021)
  - Total: 6,530
  - Religions: Hindu
- Time zone: UTC+5:45 (Nepal Time)
- Postal code: 45100
- Website: www.khalte.com

Khalte is a part of Nilkantha municipality in Dhading District in the Bagmati pradesh of central Nepal. It consists of the places like Phyakse, Khalte, Pateni, Pimalkhola, Shyaldadan, Paharechhap, Deurali, Ramche, Dada Gaun. The majority of the population are involved in agriculture. Majority of the youths are gone for employment in foreign countries like Saudi Arabia, Qatar, UAE, Malaysia, Japan, and Australia. The village was a hub of the Maoist movement in Nepal. The ward office of Nilkantha-5 (Khalte) is located at Phyakse.

== History ==
The village was severely damaged by the 2026 Nepal floods.

== Population ==
At the 1991 Nepal census, it had a population of 5750 and had 1087 houses in it. According to 2021 Nepal census, the total population of the ward is 6530 with 1478 households.
