= President Chure-Terai Madhesh Conservation Area Program =

Nature conservation in Nepal

- Type: GO
- Website: chureboard.gov.np

President Chure-Terai Madhesh Conservation Area Program is one of the National Pride Projects initiated by the Government of Nepal. The aim of the program is to conserve the natural resources of Chure region, which occupies 12.78% of Nepal, by sustainable management and promotion of ecological services. The program was launched after the 1st Nepalese Constituent Assembly in 2067/68 BS under the Ministry of Forest and Soil Conservation.

== Background ==
The Chure region is considered as a fragile mountain range in the Himalayas because of its young age. This region is a major source of water, ecology, and biodiversity. Sometimes, this region is also referred to as the water tower because the Terai region, where millions of people reside, depends directly on the water supplied by this region. Recently, the rivers in this region started to dry which possibly due to mass extraction of sand and boulders for construction works.

Thus, to protect the region, a program was initiated with focus to reduce the possible damage by climate change and natural disasters. This is supposed to be done by implementing sustainable management of natural resources such as land, water, vegetation and biodiversity in the Chure area of Terai region. The program also focuses on water-borne disasters. In addition, the program works with the community to increase access to firewood and fuel resources to reduce the impact in the environment.

== Master plan ==
The project is managed by a committee formed in 2014, which has prepared a 20 years Master Plan that contains various sub-projects. These projects are funded by Nepal government and some international organizations. The study by the committee has identified 164 rivers in 36 districts in the Chure region. In 2021, government allocated NPR 1.91 billion for the project. The master plan has 10 medium terms and 20 long-term projects.

The major work under the master plan includes integration of river, construction of embankment and green belt, prevention of soil erosion, planting in the encroached forest area, recharging of aquifers.

== Sub-projects ==
- Conservation of Nadiman lake in Sarlahi district. The lake was protected by the program. To make it sustainable, the fee collected from the visitors is reutilized for the conservation.

== See also ==
- National Pride Projects
- National Trust for Nature Conservation
