= Locust infestation in Nepal =

Locusts (Slaha/सलह) have been infesting Nepal from time to time. In general, locusts enter Nepal via India. The locust infestations typically have a profound impact on food security in the country.

== History of Locust infestation ==
- 1962 Nepal experienced the first recorded locusts attack as per Government of Nepal
- 1996 the swarms destroyed 80% of crops in Chitwan and partially damaged crops in the Makwanpur, Mahottari and Bara districts.
- 2020 June/July The locusts were spotted in Bara, Sarlahi, Parsa and Rupandehi districts. The swarms came to Nepal via Odisa of India. Some locust were sighted in Kathmandu. Nepal government issued notice to farmer for control of damage. (see also 2019–22 locust infestation).

== See also ==
- List of locust swarms
- Agriculture in Nepal
