= Babai Irrigation Project =

Babai Irrigation Project (बबई सिचाई आयोजना) is an irrigation project in western Nepal which aim to irrigate 36,000 ha of land by using water of Babai River. The project has been listed as the National Pride Projects of Nepal and is implemented by the Ministry of Energy, Water Resources and Irrigation (Nepal). The project aims to irrigate about 21,000 ha and 15,000 ha in the eastern and western side of the river respectively. The project cost is estimated to be about NPR 17,340,000,000.

== Project implementation ==
(Years in BS refers to Bikram Sambat)

The master plan study of the project was done in 2024 BS which concluded to irrigate 21,000 ha and 15,000 ha in the eastern and western side of the river respectively.

=== First stage ===
In 2035 BS, the first stage of the feasibility study was done to irrigate 13,240 ha in the eastern branch and detail engineering was done for the same in 2040BS.

When the world bank in 2046 BS disagreed to fund the project, the district level committee started the work on its own by firstly constructing the highway weir cum bridge over the Babai River. This work was completed in 2049 BS.

By 2050 BS 5.5km of the canal was constructed and the traditional canals (Budhi kulo, Majro Kulo, Raj Kulo and Dhadhawar kulo) were fed to irrigate about 4000 ha.

From 2051 BS to 2058 BS, 28 km of the canal was constructed.

=== Second stage ===
The design works of the second stage of the construction were concluded in 2058 BS. As of 2020, this stage is still ongoing. Study of the canal from chainage 28 km to 43 km is being carried out.

== See also ==
- Bheri Babai Diversion Multipurpose Project
- National Pride Projects
- Ministry of Energy, Water Resources and Irrigation (Nepal)
