= Budhiganga Hydropower Project =

- Location within Nepal
- Official name: Budhiganga Hydropower Project
- Country: Nepal
- Location: Achham and Bajura districts
- Coordinates: 29°15′30″N 81°17′50″E
- Purpose: Power
- Status: under construction
- Owners: Nepal Government (DOED)

Dam and spillways
- Type of dam: Gravity
- Impounds: Budhi Ganga River

Budhiganga Hydropower Project
- Type: Run-of-the-river
- Hydraulic head: 90 m (300 ft)
- Turbines: 2 x 10 MW Francis-type Vertical Axis
- Installed capacity: 20 MW

Budhiganga Hydropower Project is a peaking run-of-river type located at the Achham and Bajura districts of Nepal. The headworks of the project is located in a narrow gorge below Rakse Khand. All major project structures are located on the left bank of the river. The project site is about 890 km west of Kathmandu. The design flow is 27.63 m^{3}/s and gross head is 90 m giving an output of 20 MW and annual average energy of 106.28 GWh. The peaking capacity is 0.236 Mm^{3}. The waterways consist of 5.6 km long tunnel.

The project is owned by Nepal Government. The total project cost is NPR 6 Billion.

== Progress ==
The project is under construction. The project was scheduled to be completed in 2019, but has been delayed. As of 2020, the access road construction, staff quarters and land acquisition have been completed. Budget of NPR 2.2 Billion has been allocated for the fiscal year of 2020/21.

== Funding ==
The Saudi Fund for Development and Kuwait Fund for Arab Economic Development are assisting for the project development.

== See also ==
- Department of Electricity Development
