= Animal husbandry in Nepal =

Breeding and care for farm animals for economic, cultural and religious reasons, also known as animal husbandry (Nepali: नेपालमा पशुपालन), is a growing occupation in Nepal.

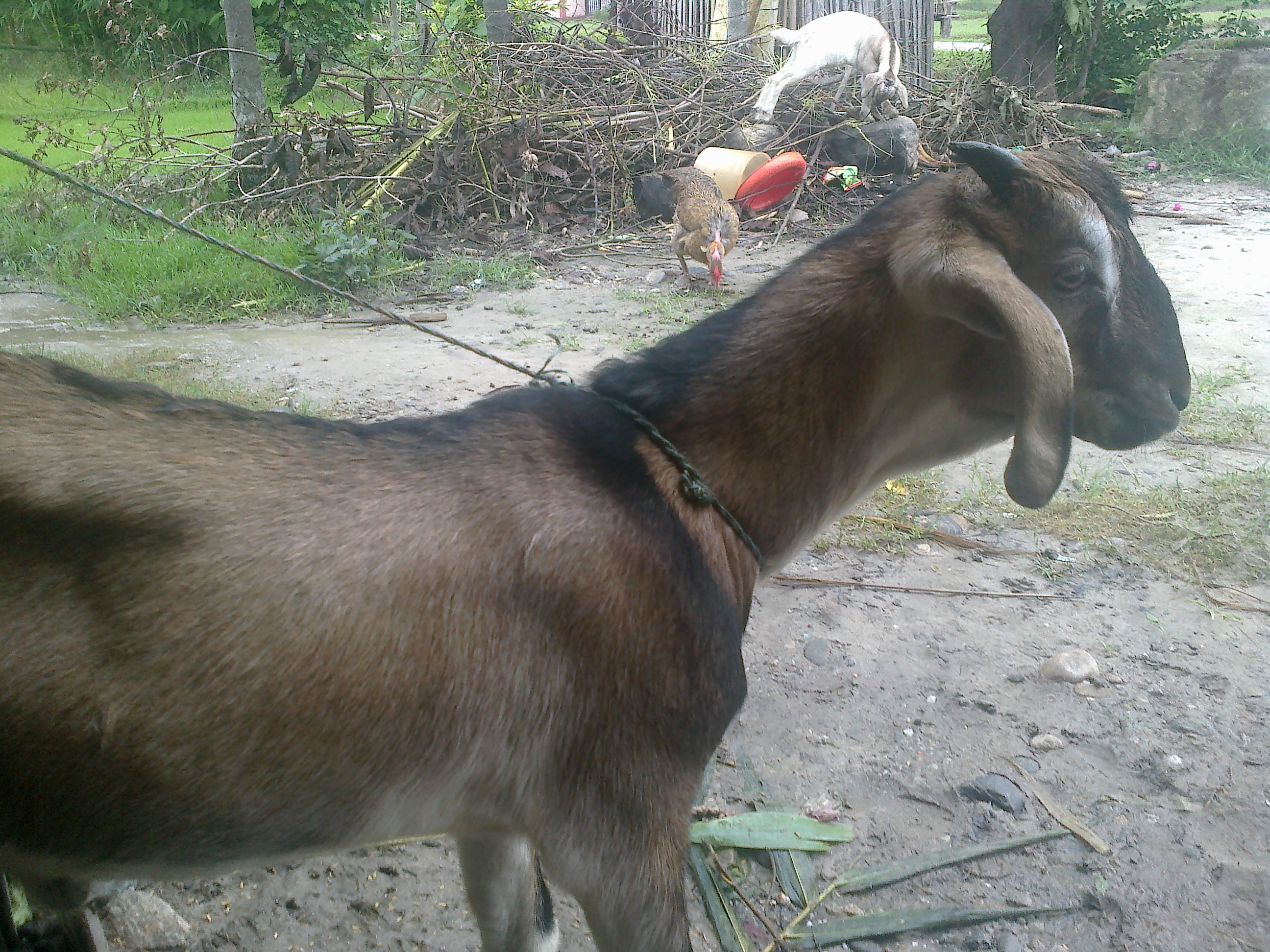
A domesticated goat in Nepal.

== History ==
Animals were reared in the distant past in Nepal, but the history of proper animal husbandry in the country dates back to the period of the Gopal Dynasty. It is believed that Gopal kings used to rear cows. When the Gospels entered Nepal from India, they brought cows with them. Similarly, the Mahispal dynasty used to rear buffalo.

== Present status ==
In Nepal, animal husbandry is one of the main occupations, along with farming, as Nepal is an agricultural country. About 30% of the total population is engaged in agriculture. In Nepal, people rear different animals like goats, pigs, Cattle, oxen, buffalos, Chickens and dogs.

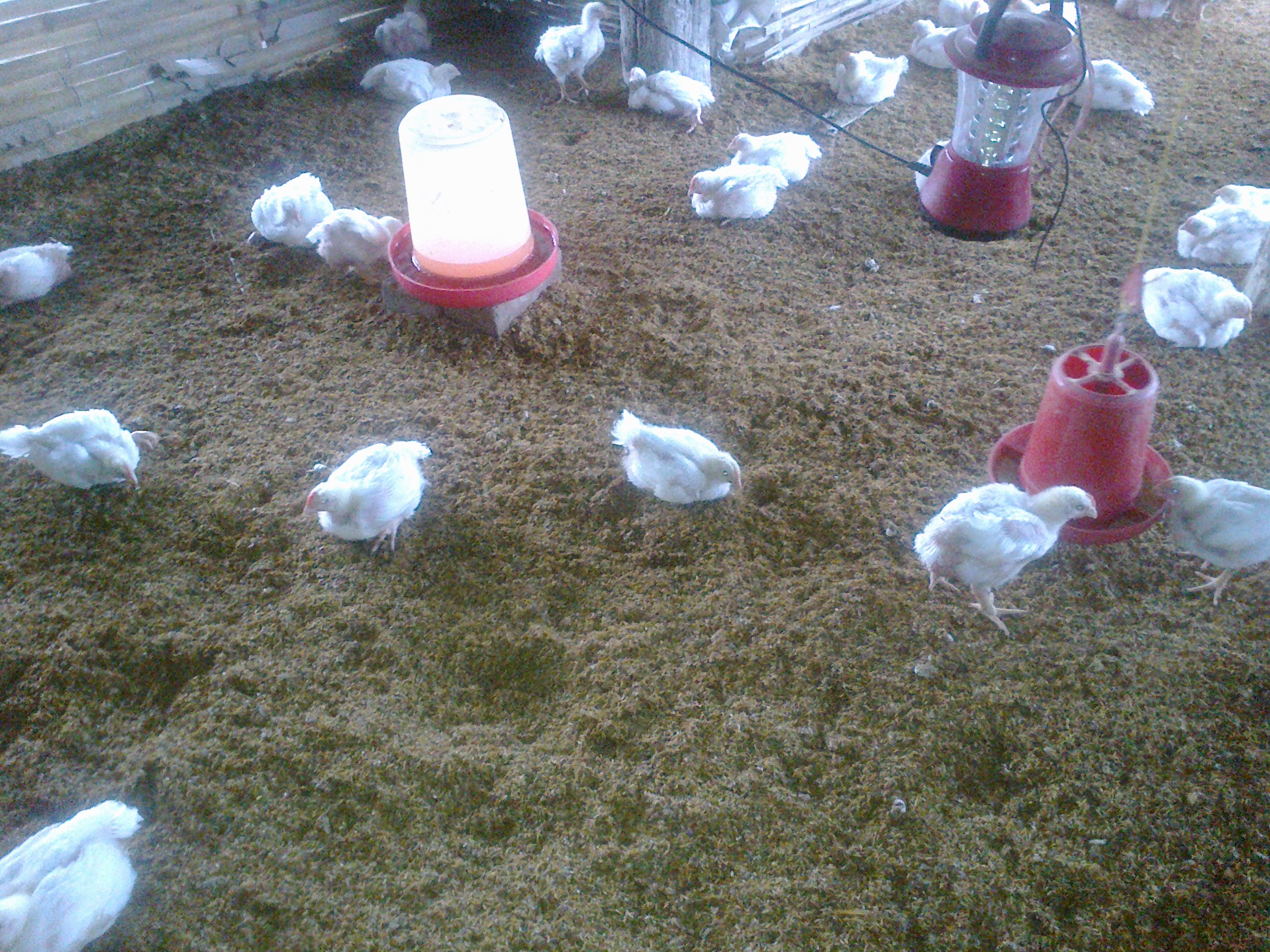
Poultry farming in Nepal

== See also ==
- Agriculture in Nepal
- Agriculture
- Nepal
