= Budhigandaki Hydroelectric Project =

Proposed hydroelectric power plant in Nepal

Budhi Gandaki Hydropower project
- Location within Nepal
- Country: Nepal
- Location: Ghyalchok, Gorkha district, Western Development Region / Salang, Dhading district, Central Development Region
- Coordinates: 27°49′32″N 84°46′25″E
- Purpose: Power
- Status: Proposed
- Construction cost: $2.5 billion

Dam and spillways
- Impounds: Budhi Gandaki River
- Height (thalweg): 263 m
- Spillway capacity: 12,827 m^{3}/s

Reservoir
- Total capacity: 3,3 km^{3}
- Catchment area: 5.000 km²
- Surface area: 49.8 km²
- Maximum length: 45 km
- Normal elevation: 540 m

Power Station
- Type: Storage
- Hydraulic head: 185 m
- Installed capacity: 1,200 MW
- Annual generation: 3,383 GWh

The Budhi Gandaki Hydroelectric Project is a proposed hydroelectric power plant in Nepal, to be developed by Nepal Electricity Authority (NEA).

This storage hydropower plant is to be located on the Budhi Gandaki River, approximately 2 km upstream of its confluence with Trishuli River, about 55 km west of Kathmandu (80 km by road).

With its planned installed capacity of 1,200 MW, it is the largest hydropower project in Nepal (before 900 MW Upper Karnali and Arun III projects), being sometimes considered a national pride. The 225 meters high dam will also be one of the highest in the country.

Aside from the dam, a 225 km long ring road will be built all around the future reservoir, which may also serve as a tourist attraction.

The site has been identified as early as in the late 1970s. A pre-feasibility study was carried out in 1984, and a first feasibility study in 1998. Additional studies conducted by the NEA in 2010–2011 in order to optimize hydropower potential use on the site led to the current proposal.

As of May 2019, the resettlement process was ongoing, with Rs 20 billion already spent in land acquisition in both concerned districts, and another Rs 18 billion set aside to complete compensation by the next fiscal year. In the meanwhile, Finance Misistry started to raise concerns over the total cost of the project.

In June 2019, the 635 MW Dudh Koshi Hydroelectric Project was favoured by NEA to Budi Gandaki HPP, due to its lower social impact ("only" 162 households severely impacted), lower cost ($1.5 billion), slightly higher and substantially more steady power output, thanks to its feeding by Mount Everest snowmelt during the dry season. Conversely, Budhi Gandaki HPP, which used to be considered "top priority", was compromised by its massive cost and uncertainty related to population relocation. As a result, financing and construction of the latter might not occur during the next few years.

As of November 2019, a total Rs 37 billion ($300 million) had been raised for the project, mostly via an infrastructure tax on petroleum products imports. This tax allows to collect an estimated Rs 1 billion per month. The government targets to achieve the compensation process by mid-July 2020.

== Social and environmental concerns ==
The 49.8 km^{2} large, 45 km long reservoir generated by the dam is expected to displace 45,000 people. Those residents are to be relocated to a dedicated 785 hectares area.

There are other concerns from India. In case of dam failure the millions of people will be affected in Bihar and Bengal.

There is also large impact on fishing industry as the dam will block the migration of many fish species which impacts fisherman.

Another impact is the heightened water levels will erode the already unstable hills of Dadhing and Gorkha. People who are living above the flooded area were not relocated will be exposed to potential landslides.
