= India–Norway relations =

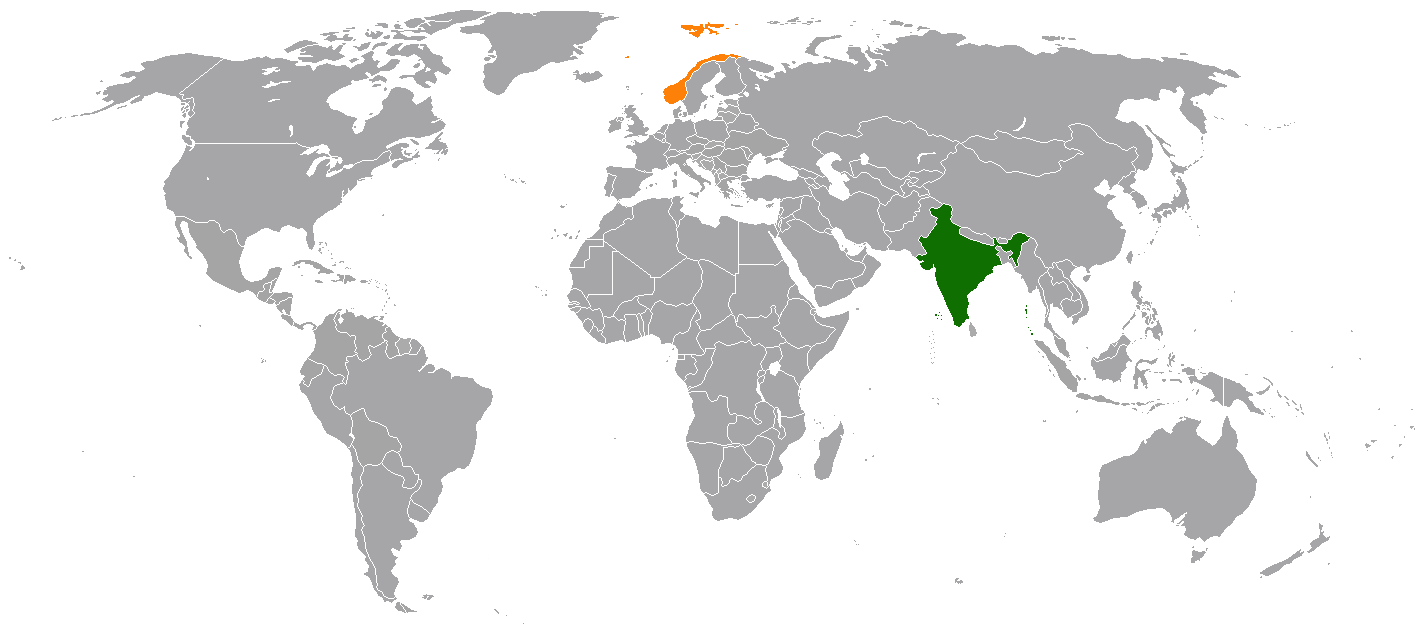
- India: Norway

Diplomatic mission
- Embassy of India, Oslo: Embassy of Norway, New Delhi

India–Norway relations are the bilateral relations between the countries of India and Norway. Since the independence of India in 1947, the two nations have maintained a strong relationship as with India's relations with other Nordic countries.

India has an embassy in Oslo. Norway has an embassy in New Delhi and three consulates-general in Chennai, Kolkata and Mumbai.

== History ==
In the 18th and 19th centuries, Norway was part of Denmark. During that time, the entity of Danish India existed.

== Economic relations ==
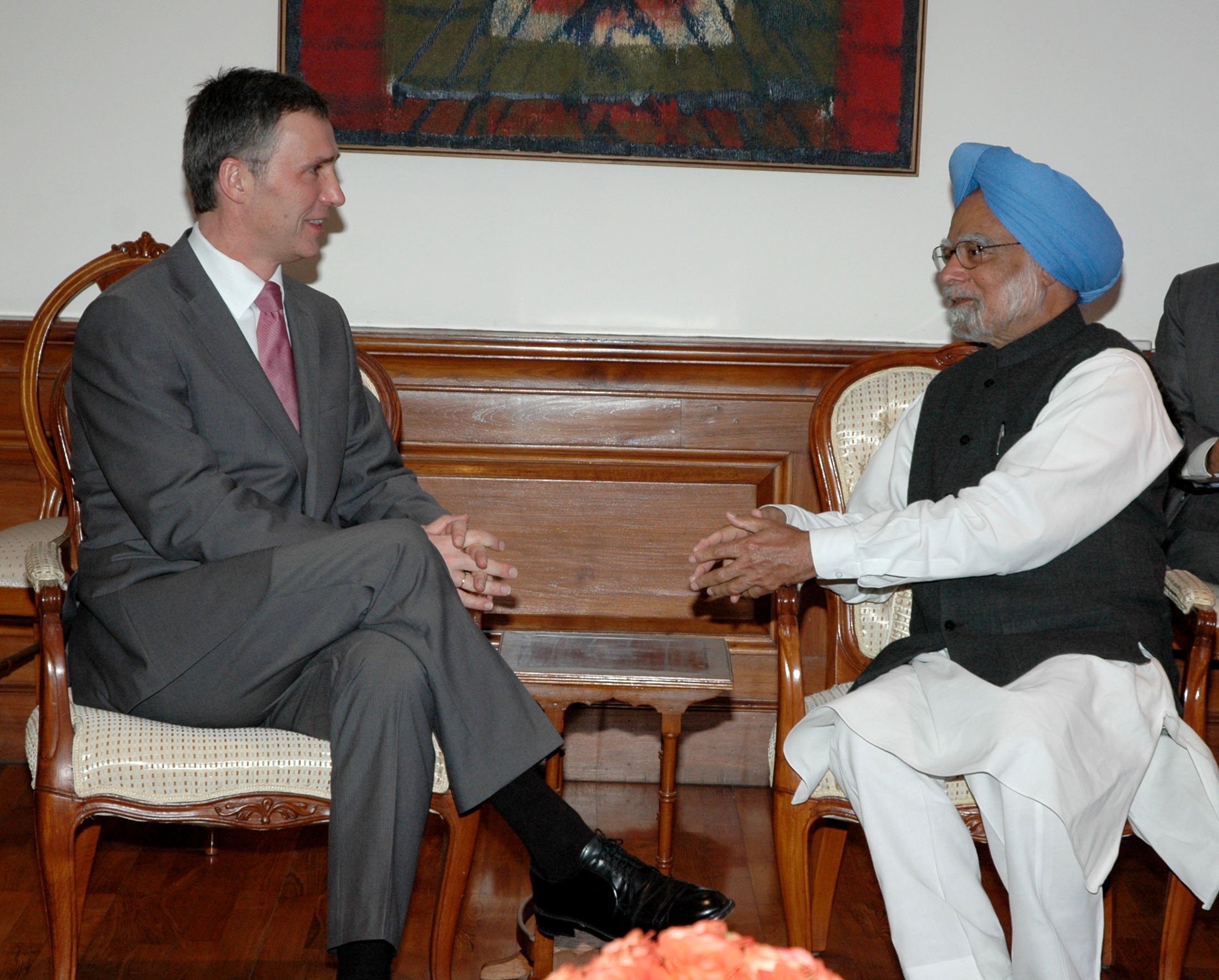
Norwegian Prime Minister Jens Stoltenberg (left) meets with Indian Prime Minister Manmohan Singh (right), during a visited to New Delhi, on 4 February 2010.

Norway's Telenor, a major Norwegian telephone company has been investing in India, and became a major telephone company in India. Telenor has invested over 3 billion dollars in the Indian market, but had warned about "political implications" if this failed.

In 2014, India and Norway signed 13 agreements to help strengthen the ties between India and Norway as well as other Nordic nations.

Norway sees India as an important partner for economic development. India imported over 268.68 million dollars of goods from Norway while exporting to Norway over 82.3 million dollars of goods as of 2010 census, but has since then diversifying it to reduce the trade balance.

== Embassies ==
Embassy of India, Oslo
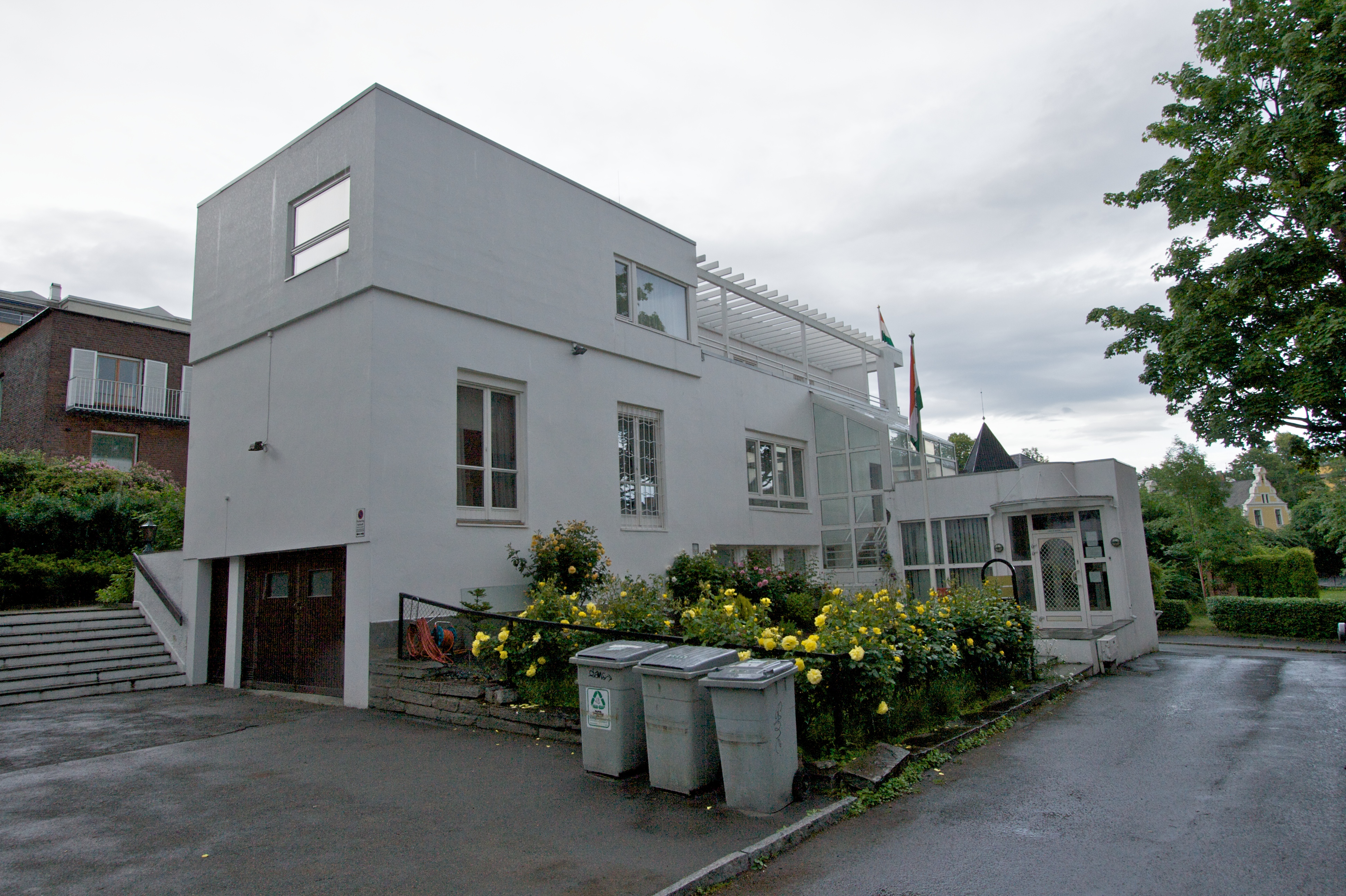
- Address: Niels Juels gate 30
- Ambassador: Boddu Bhala Bhaskar
- Jurisdiction: Norway
- Website: Official website

The Indian Embassy in Oslo is located in a house from 1938 designed by Gudolf Blakstad and Herman Munthe-Kaas.

The Indian ambassador from June 2023 is Acquino Vimal. See also

- Indo-Norwegian Project
- Indians in Norway
