= Walnut production in Nepal =

The walnut (Jugans spp.) is a softwood tree grown and used worldwide for medicinal purposes, for its timber, and most for its eponymous fruit. The walnut species found in Nepal is Juglans regia, which is known locally as okhar.

The okhar tree is native to the mountainous areas of Central Asia, including Nepal. It is grown in the country's High Mountains region with an elevation of 1000- 4000 m. Walnut trees can be found across the temperate regions of the country as well.

In Nepal, one of the primary uses of the Okhar tree is the harvesting of its fruit. Although rarely used as a commercial crop, the walnut has been used as a traditional indigenous medicine and as a subsistence food item. In Nepal the nuts and bark have been used to treat skin disorders among other ailments. Aryal, Berg & Ogle, 2009 also reference the religious use of the walnut. Walnuts are one of the uncultivated foods of Nepal that have shown to be profitable, although not widespread for low income individuals. Nepalese law forbids the cutting down of walnut trees and the sale of walnut lumber.
