= Indo-Norwegian Project =

Foreign aid project

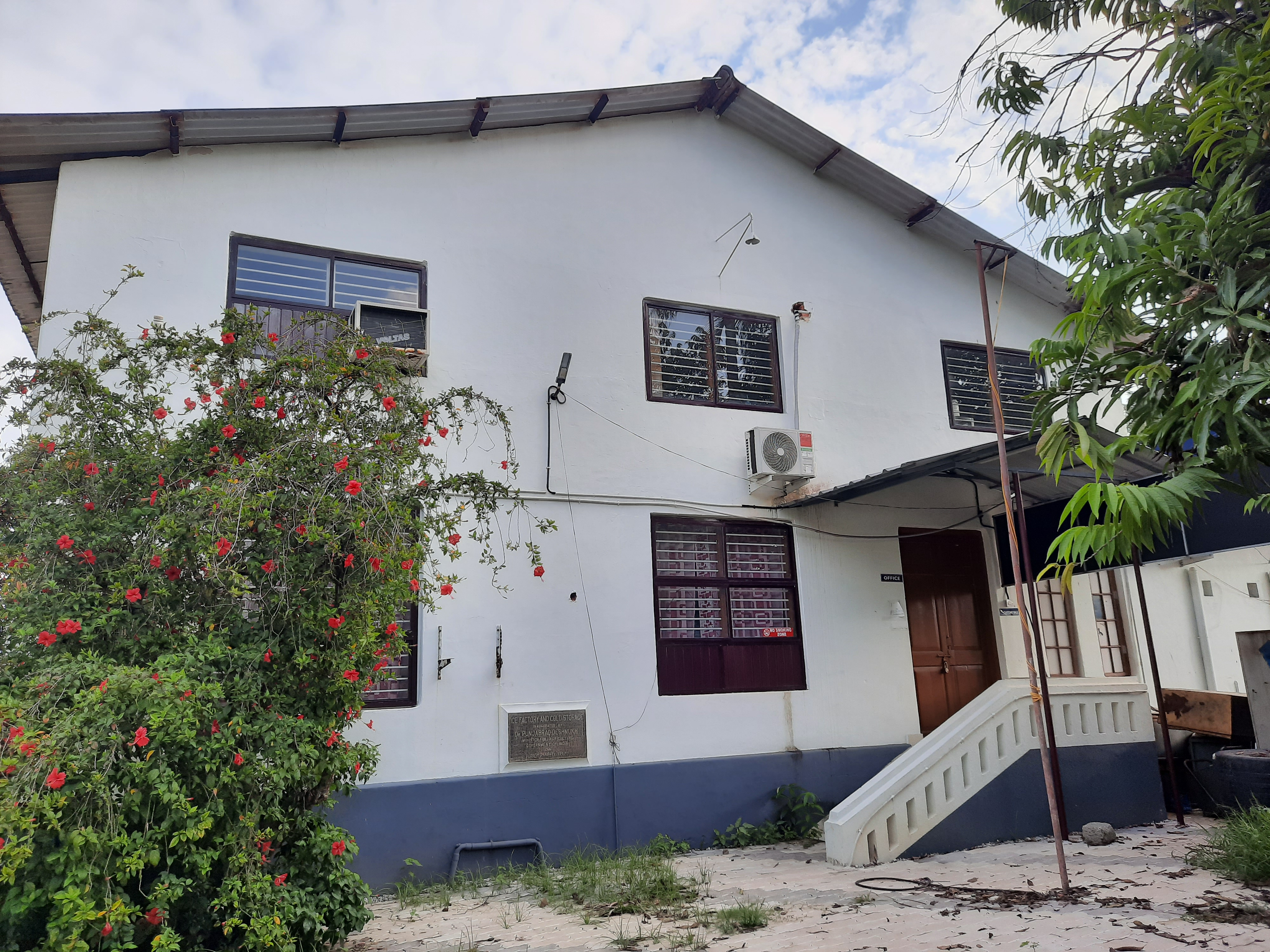
Indo-Norwegian fisheries project ice plant, Kollam

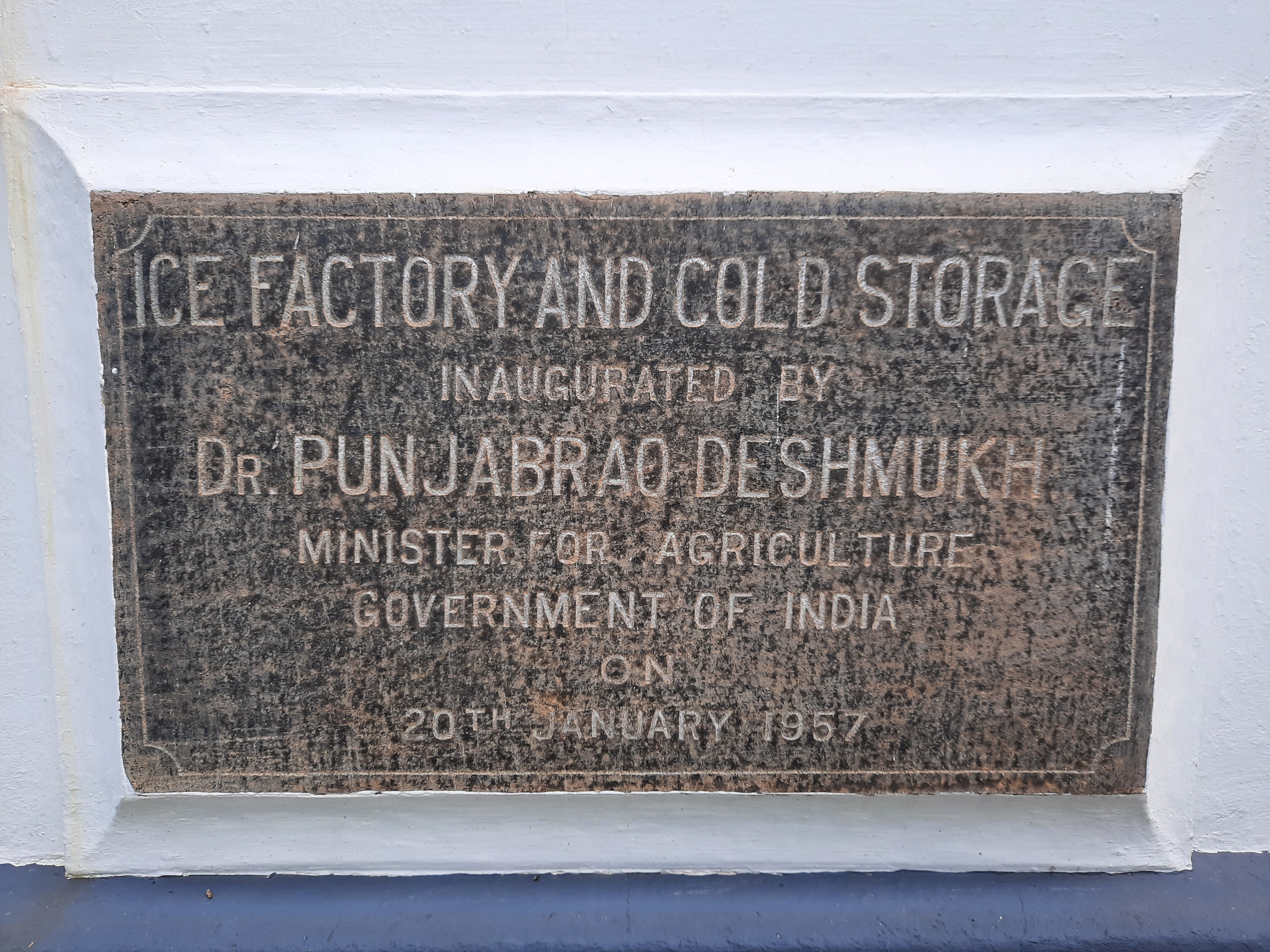
Indo-Norwegian fisheries project ice plant inauguration Stone slab

The Indo-Norwegian Project was Norway's first foreign aid development project. The project was first established in Neendakara, near Quilon, Kerala, in 1953; its aim was the modernisation of fisheries in Kerala. It also included improvements in health, sanitation, and water supply, including building a water pipe factory. The project was moved to Ernakulam in 1961 and started focusing on fisheries only. At Ernakulam, an ice plant and workshop with a slipway for fishing vessels were built. Between 1952 and 1972, Norway gave technical and financial assistance worth 120 million Norwegian kroner to India.

== See also ==
- India–Norway relations
