= National Trading Limited =

National Trading Limited is the parent company that monitors all aspects of trading in Nepal. It is part of the Ministry of Commerce of the Government of Nepal (GoN). The National Trading Limited Board of Directors has five members, and is responsible for formulating short and long-term policies on NTL's periodical plans, programmers and policies. The chairman and the General Manager are responsible for the appropriate execution of the plans, programmers and policies formulated and decided by the Board. The chairman and the board member are all appointees of GoN.).

== Objective ==
- To stabiles the price of construction materials and industrial raw materials needed for the country both by local purchase and import.
- To maintain stable price through increase in supply by importing the necessary consumer goods of general public.
- To supply bonded ware house and duty-free goods.
- To act as an agent of Government of Nepal in the matter of import and distribution of the goods, which the GoN has to import, and distribution time to time and to handle the commodity-aids goods received for GoN.
- To engage in agencies business by getting the agent through producer for the products in which NTL is dealing.
- To earn reasonable profit in return of GoN's investment.
