= Chickpeas in Nepal =

Chickpeas are a major pulse legume grown in Nepal, either by themselves or as an intercrop with maize or rice. Chickpeas are an important legume to the population, as it is the primary protein source for nearly 2 million Nepalese people. In 2013, Nepal imported approximately US$10.1 million in dried shelled chickpeas, mostly from Australia and also from Canada, creating a need to increase production for its own people and to balance bilateral trade. In 2024, Nepal paid $584 per ton, an increase of around 23% from 2023. Chickpeas are an excellent source of protein, especially when compared to other legume pulses. They are high in unsaturated fatty acids and minerals, including calcium, magnesium, phosphorus and potassium.

== Agronomic issues and potential solutions ==
There are a number of agronomic issues, both biotic and abiotic, that have considerably reduced the production of chickpeas in the Terai of Nepal.

Botrytis gray mold (BGM) was the main cause of the rapid decline in production of chickpeas, as it completely devastated crops in 1997–1998, especially in the humid eastern part of the country causing farmers to switch to a more stable, albeit less profitable, legume such as lentils. This devastation has given chickpeas a very negative reputation of being a risky crop and has likely delayed the spread of new technologies and cultivars to increase production.

Fusarium wilt is another major biotic problem to chickpea production in Nepal. Abiotic issues include boron deficient soils, as well as infertile land due to soil acidity and drought.

However, these issues can be dealt with by low-cost techniques without having to rely heavily on expensive alternatives such as fungicides. Larger spacing between rows can decrease leaf wetness to decrease BGM. Intercropping with mustard seems to significantly reduce the disease. Coating the seed with rhizobium or mixing the rhizobium into the soil can combat poor nodulation and therefore improve the nitrogen fixing capacity of the chickpea. Poor soil fertility can be combated with vermicompost along with fertilizers to increase root length, grain yield, and further nodulation. Ideally, an integrated crop management strategy using genetically resistant seeds incorporated into local varieties, the use of fungicides, along with the simpler strategies mentioned could allow for sustainable and profitable production of chickpeas for Nepalese farmers.

== Sustainability ==
Although chickpeas are only suitable to be grown in the Terai region of Nepal, the selection and technology of new landraces would allow for proper chickpea production from the humid and acidic soils of the east to the drier western parts of the country. In the dry western parts of the country, seeds have been formulated with short durations to escape potential long droughts. In the eastern and central part of the Terai, seeds have been formulated with increased disease resistance and earlier maturity to escape the potential fungal threats in these moist and humid environments. Thus although these crops can mainly be grown only in the Terai region, it is not segregated to one geographical area and can thus improve distribution of this quality protein to a large portion of the population.

== Labor and cost ==
Chickpeas are a relatively low input crop that is quite drought resistant. They can be relatively easily intercropped with cereals such as maize or rice. Nepal imports a huge amount of rice from India, therefore intercropping with chickpeas could be a more economical option for a subsistence farmer, rather than purchasing these products from overseas.

Research has shown that seed priming can have massive effects on chickpea production in rice fallows, increasing chickpea yield by 41% by seed priming alone. Due to chickpeas high water efficiency, it can be planted after rice in the dry season, using the residual moisture to grow. This also keeps the farmers' land from being bare when the rice has been harvested, which could lead to improve organic material in the soil as well as less need for nitrogen fertilizer in subsequent rice seasons. Despite its good drought tolerance, irrigation of chickpeas in the vegetative stage has been shown to increase yields.

== Impact on families ==
Planting chickpeas can have a positive effect on the lives of subsistence farmers. Using integrated crop management strategies, including fungicides, larger distances between rows, rhizobium inoculants, and some improved cultivars of native landraces (Avarodhi cultivar over Dhanush and Trishul) can increase family income by 80 to 100%. Although the cost to implement these strategies is 13% higher (which may not be possible to obtain for a subsistence farmer) the profits per hectare could be nearly doubled. Protein intake for a farmer's family can increase by 40%, and increases in livestock ownership can increase by 30%. This can result in an increase of 45% extra income for the family.

There is additional wealth generation in the selling of these improved disease resistant Avarodhi desi seeds over the local cultivars. There have been improved varieties of Kabuli chickpeas called Kosheli. Kabuli chickpeas generally go for higher prices; in Canada they are sold for nearly 60% more money. Further economic benefit includes the decreased use of fertilizer in subsequent rice crops as well as decreases in urea requirement and compost due to its extensive root system and nitrogen fixing capacity.
