= Ministry of Irrigation (Nepal) =

- Emblem of Nepal

Agency overview
- Dissolved: February 23, 2018
- Minister responsible: Umakant Jha, Hon'ble Minister
- Agency executive: Anup Kumar Upadhyay, Secretary
- Website: moir.gov.np

Ministry of Irrigation (Nepali: सिँचाइ मन्त्रालय) was a governmental body of Nepal for the utilization and management of water resources in the country. It was merged to form Ministry of Water Resources and Energy in February 2018.

== Current Activities ==
As per the Work Division (Second Amendment) Rules, 2066 of Government of Nepal, this ministry has been entrusted with the following tasks:

- Development of policies, plan and implementation for conservation, regulation and utilization of irrigation.
- Conduct survey, research and feasibility study of irrigation and its utilization.
- Construction, operation and maintenance and promotion of multipurpose irrigation project.
- Development of Human Resources and their capacity building.
- Activities related to Flood and River Training.
- Study, research, feasibility study, construction, operation, maintenance and development of irrigation.
- Promotion of private parties in irrigation development.
- Study, research and implementation of water resources.
- Groundwater Resources.
- Construction, conservation, integrated use of irrigation facility (including programs related to farm irrigation and small irrigation) of Irrigation Projects.
- Matters related to national and international level seminars, workshops and contacts.
- Matters related to bilateral and multilateral dialogues, agreements and understandings regarding irrigation.
- Coordination of institutions related to irrigation.
- Matters related to tax on use of water.
- Water Induced Disaster Management and Prevention .
- Study, research and implementation of Water Induced Disaster.
- Development of policies, plan and implementation for conservation, regulation and utilization of Water Induced Disaster Prevention.
- International representative on subject of Water Induced Disaster.
- Matters related to recruitment, transfer, promotion, fixation of minimum qualification for first appointment, determination of subject and qualification to be accounted for promotion and departmental action of employees under following Engineering Services:

- Meteorology Group
- Irrigation Sub-group
