= Sikta Irrigation Project =

Sikta Irrigation Project is one of the National Pride Projects of Nepal. The intake is in the Rapti river in western Nepal. There are two canals with the capacity of 50 m3/s each. The length of canal is 45.25 kilometres in the western section and 53 kilometres in the eastern section. The canals are constituted into 3 phases. As of 2019, 60% of the project has been completed.

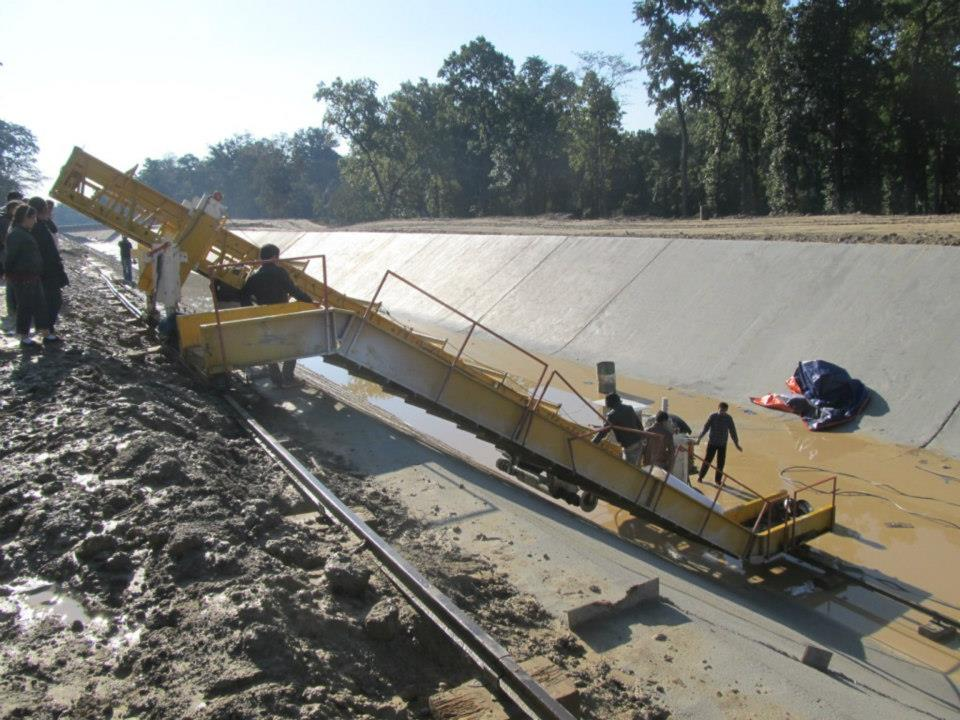
Sikta Irrigation Canal during construction

== Project Development ==
The feasibility study of the project was done by Lahmeyer International GmbH from Germany in 1980. In 1983, the Department of Hydrology and Metrology revised the study. In 2004, the Irrigation Development Programme under the European Union concluded that the project is feasible which led the government to start the project by its own resources.

The initial project cost in 2005-06 was NPR 12.8 billion and estimated to be completed by 2014–15. The project is still under construction and is estimated to be complete by 2020. The project is expected to rise to NPR 25.02 billion. In 2019, the project completion was 60%.

The contractor for construction is CTC Kalika Joint Venture Pvt Ltd. The project targets to irrigate 42,000 hectares of land in Banke District.

== Damages and Accidents ==
- In 2016, a canal section collapsed due to weak soil properties during testing at the flow of 5m³/s.
- In September 2017, damages were reported in multiple section of the canal. The damage was due to cross-drainage problem in the canal. Most of the damage were found near the siphon areas.
- In 2018, damages in canal were reported during testing.

== Corruption ==
The national Commission for Investigation of Abuse of Authority (CIAA) has lodged a corruption case of over NPR 2 billion in this project. The case was filed against former minister and chief of Kalika Construction Bikram Pandey over the construction of a canal and 20 other staffs. CIAA has made claims of Rs 2.13 billion from Bikram Pandey, NPR 1.56 billion from Dilip Bahadur Karki and NPR 593.45 million from Saroj Chandra Pandit. It also claims Rs 24.05 million from Uddhav Raj Chaulagai, the managing director of the consulting company (ERMC).

== See also ==
- Department of Water Resources and Irrigation
