= Sunkoshi Marin Diversion Project =

Sunkoshi Marin Diversion Project (सुनकोशी मरिन डाइभर्सन आयोजना) is one of the National Pride Projects being developed by Ministry of Energy, Water Resources and Irrigation (Nepal). The project got status of National Pride Projects in 20 January 2020.

The project is an inter-basin transfer project to transfer water from Sunkoshi River to the Marin Khola, a tributary of Bagmati River. The flow will be discharged to the Bagmati Irrigation System to irrigate additional 122,000 ha of land in Rautahat, Dhanusha, Mahottari, Sarlahi and Bara.

The main objective of Sunkoshi Marin Diversion Multipurpose Project (SMDMP) is to meet the discharge deficit in the churiya region of mid Nepal. The project is expected to increase recharge and irrigation especially in the valley of Marin river. It will also contribute to increase the flow contributed by the Bagmati River during the dry season. The design flow of the project is 67 m3/s. The intake has a 12 m high diversion dam in Sunkoshi river. The flow is transferred via 13.3 km long tunnel. The project also has a power station to generate 38.62 MW of electricity. The powerhouse is located in Kamalamai municipality.

The project cost is NPR 37.2 billion for irrigation and NPR 46.19 billion for hydro-electricity.

The tunnel got break through on 8 May 2024 despite adverse geological condition. In November 2023 the drilling got stuck for a short period of time due to bedded schist, rock joints and cracks which was altered.

== See also ==
- List of National Pride Projects of Nepal
