= Department of Electricity Development =

Electricity utility company of Nepal

- विद्युत विकास विभाग

Department overview
- Formed: 1993; 33 years ago
- Type: Electricity development
- Jurisdiction: Government of Nepal
- Status: Active
- Headquarters: Sano Gaucharan, Kathmandu, Nepal
- Annual budget: Nrs. 3.18 Billion (FY 2081/82)
- Director General responsible: Chiranjeewee Chataut
- Parent department: Ministry of Energy, Water Resources and Irrigation
- Website: www.doed.gov.np

Department of Electricity Development (Nepali: विद्युत विकास विभाग) under Ministry of Energy, Water Resources and Irrigation is the authority to implement the government policies related to power/electricity sector. It also works as regarding providing licence for private sector to produce electricity.

Nepal is a country with high electricity generation potential, and the department accounts for a significant amount of the national budget.

== History ==
DOED was established in 1993 AD to assist the Ministry of Energy in implementing its policy in the sector of energy and helping its task of distributing licenses for hydropower project construction.

== Organization ==
The department and its branch offices are run by officers of Nepal Engineering Service (Civil/Hydropwer).

The department has four major projects along with its central body at central level. Major hydro and multi-purpose projects including Sapta Koshi High Dam Multipurpose Project, Pancheshwar Multipurpose Project, Budhiganga Hydropower Project, Naumure Multipurpose Project and a few other projects also run under the department.

== See also ==
- Department of Water Resources and Irrigation
- Department of Local Infrastructure
