= Devex =

Social enterprise and media platform

- Type: News organization
- Industry: Media
- Founded: 2000; 26 years ago
- Headquarters: 1701 Rhode Island Avenue NW, Washington, D.C., U.S.
- Key people: Raj Kumar, Alan Robbins, Kate Warren
- Number of employees: 120 (2020)
- Website: www.devex.com

Devex is a social enterprise and media platform for the global development community. It aims to connect with and inform development, health, humanitarian, and sustainability professionals through news, business intelligence, funding and career opportunities related to international development. It employs more than 100 people in various locations. Its headquarters is in Washington, D.C. and also has offices in Barcelona and Manila. It has more than 800,000 registered members, including development organizations, donor agencies, suppliers and aid workers. The company claims to have more than 1 million active users. Its Devex's founder, president and editor-in-chief is Raj Kumar.

== History ==
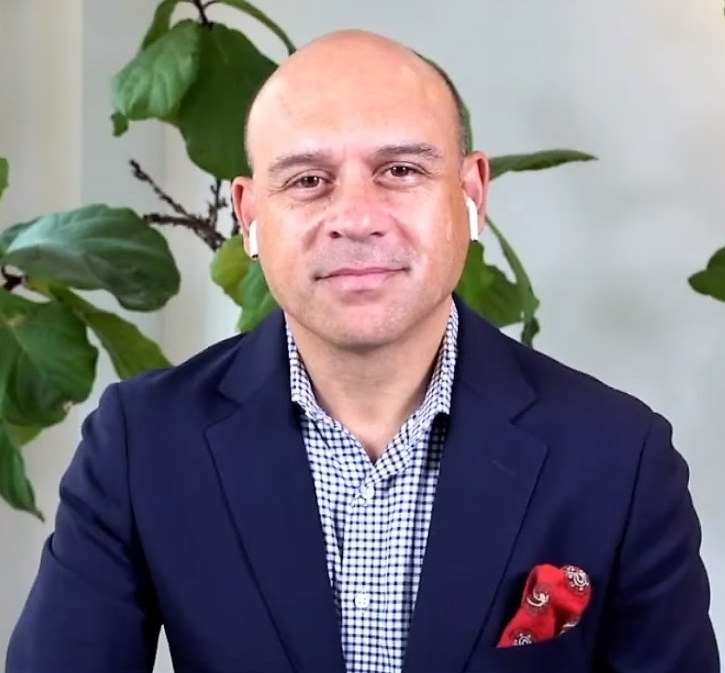
Kumar in 2022

Raj Kumar founded Devex in 2000 while working towards a master's degree at Harvard's Kennedy School of Government, after developing the digital financial newsletter Smartportfolio.com with four of his friends and selling the company to TheStreet.com. Kumar’s goal was to lower the administrative costs of donor agencies so they could devote a greater share of resources to foreign-assistance projects themselves.

Devex expanded its media arm in 2008, hiring dozens of reporters and employing freelancers worldwide. Devex produces a daily newswire covering global development news, emerging trends and issues within the development sector, and commentary and analysis from leading voices in global development.

In 2008, Devex launched the Devex Forum, an annual two-day conference that brings together the world's largest international organizations to exchange information and expertise. This includes government donor agencies, NGOs, and international corporations. The forums are held annually in East Asia, East Africa and Washington DC.

In 2013, USAID and Devex together launched Devex Impact. Devex Impact provides the latest partnership information, news, and tools available to companies, donors, recipient governments, implementers, NGOs, and professionals working at fields intersecting business and global development.

In 2016, Devex released the #PowerwithPurpose list that included five women who influence the world. That same year, Devex and Foreign Affairs and the U.N. Foundation again partnered to host a White House Correspondents' Dinner event, Global Beat 2016 and Celebrating International Journalism.

In 2017, Devex reported that the largest-ever contract awarded by USAID was facing problems that put access to health commodities at risk. The report led to a congressional hearing 9 months later. In December of the same year, following the #MeToo movement campaign, Devex hosted a Twitter chat using the viral hashtag #AidToo to highlight the stories of sexual abuse and survivors of sexual assault in the humanitarian aid industry.

In February 2020, Devex held Prescription for Progress, a health technology conference, where the Rockefeller Foundation and Medic Mobile announced their Medic Labs initiative. Devex also hosted a conversation with Ambassador Deborah Birx where she discussed her concerns about the proposed budget cuts to the U.S. President’s Emergency Plan for AIDS Relief in 2020.

During the COVID-19 pandemic, Devex first reported the layoffs of one-third of the staff at the well-known NGO Oxfam on March 20, 2020. On May 22, 2020, Devex first reported the U.S. Department of State circulated a document proposing a new global health security initiative called 'The President’s Response to Outbreaks' that would consolidate international pandemic preparedness under a new State Department coordinator and establish a new central fund to fight pandemics.

On June 6, 2020, J. K. Rowling used an opinion piece from Devex to tweet her criticism of the use of the phrase "people who menstruate" instead of "women". The viral tweet gathered many global response's from LGBT rights groups as well as the Harry Potter film actors.

== News coverage ==
At the 2013 European Development Days in Brussels, Devex spoke to Winne Byanyima, executive director of Oxfam International, about the shifting development landscape.

While it was still in operation, Devex also regularly covered the Clinton Global Initiative, or CGI, annual meeting that convened global leaders to discuss solutions for global development challenges. In 2014, former President Bill Clinton spoke to Devex about the future of cross-sector development collaboration and partnership ahead of the CGI meeting in New York.

At the height of the Western African Ebola virus epidemic, Devex associate editor Richard Jones traveled to Guinea with the European Commissioner for International Cooperation Neven Mimica to report on European efforts to combat the epidemic. During the 2015 World Bank/International Monetary Fund Spring Meetings, World Bank President Jim Yong Kim sat down with Devex president and editor-in-chief Raj Kumar for an exclusive interview about the controversial World Bank reforms and the future of the Bank.

In May 2015, Asian Development Bank President Takehiko Nakao spoke exclusively to Devex about the merger between the Asian Development Bank and Ordinary Capital Resources.

In April 2021, Devex was the first to report UK government budget cuts for the Global Polio Eradication Initiative (GPEI) by 95%, from £100m to £5m, as well as funding cuts for water, sanitation, and hygiene cut by 80%.

Devex hosted a virtual forum in May 2021 during the ongoing World Health Assembly to discuss inequalities in global COVID-19 vaccine access, such as the AstraZeneca vaccine.

== Services ==
Devex uses content-sharing and social-networking tools to help international development professionals find information. The features offered on Devex.com include a searchable database of over 700,000 professionals and a company directory listing more than 12,000 development companies.

Devex also provides its members with information about projects being funded by over 350 bilateral and multilateral donor agencies. Its real-time intelligence on the development sector prompted the Washington Post to compare Devex to Bloomberg L.P.’s financial information service. At any given time, the site provides details on as many as 35,000 active projects in the developing world. Devex members receive several types of reports on these activities including:

- Tender Reports consolidating specific procurement notices from over 150 donor agencies, which are posted on 'devex.com' within 24 hours of their initial publication.
- Project Reports provide information on opportunities presented as part of the funding for specific aid projects or programs.
- Early Intelligence Reports use interviews with agency representatives, government officials, and other inside sources to provide Devex's Executive Members with project information that has not yet been publicly released.
- Business Insight Articles
- Country Pipeline Strategy Reports
