= Beekeeping in Nepal =

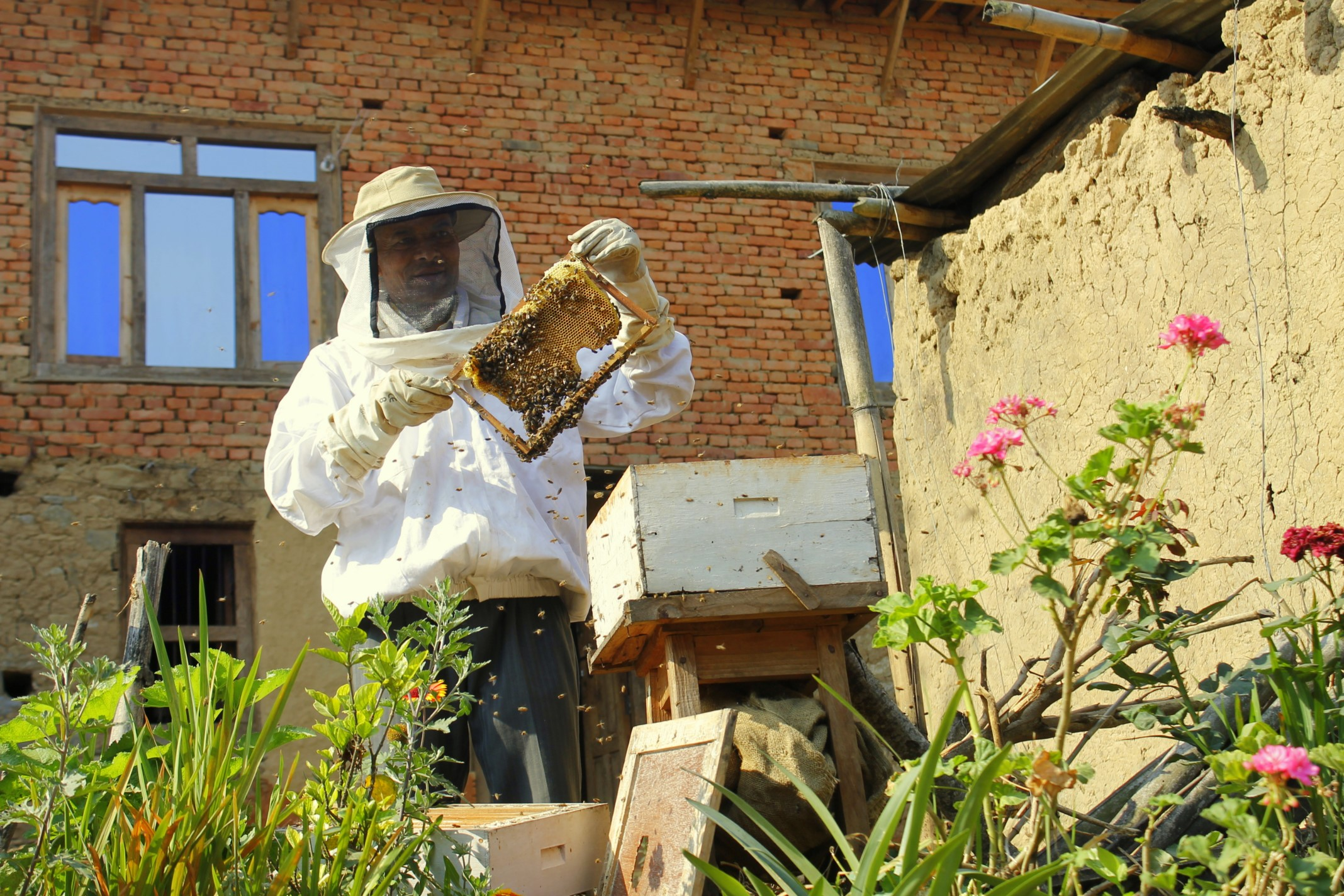
Beekeeper in Nepal

Nepal is known for its ancestral technology of beekeeping: geographical conditions and lack of modern equipment have forced the collectors to risk their lives. Apiculture in Nepal began 20 years ago but is still not very developed. Different species of honey-producing bees are found in Nepal. Only two of them are raised for apiculture: Apis cerana, Apis mellifera and Apis florea. These species have several qualities that are desired by humans and are vital for the pollination of flowers and forests. Bees are also useful for agriculture which is an important activity in Nepal but they have become threatened by deforestation and parasites (e.g. varroa).

== Bee species ==
Apis mellifera and Apis cerana are the only honey-producing bees known in Nepal.

A. cerana lives in Nepal at an altitude of 60 to 3500 m (Thapa, 2001) and produces honey two times a year. The first time is during the summer (March to May) and the second time during the winter (November to December).

A. cerana is much more resistant than Apis mellifera to cold and predators. During the winter, most Apis cerana colonies are reduced because of the harsh weather and the low amount of flowers. Nevertheless, compared to A. mellifera, A. cerana can survive in low temperatures (i.e. -0,1 °C) (Thapa, 2001) because their beehives (i.e. log hive) can protect themselves from the cold. Furthermore, A. cerana is resistant to the parasite, Varroa destructor. The acarid breed feeds on bees’ larva. A. melifera is very sensitive to this parasite and causes an incapacity to fly, an abdominal malformation and appearance of cannibalism (Experimental and Applied Acarology, 2000).

A. cerana is very famous in Nepal because of the low cost of its beehive, the log hive. Farmers can build their own beehives. The principle is to big a hole in a trunk (the size is about 50 cm in diameter and 65 cm in height), and then a cap is necessary to protect the top of the beehive from cold and predators (e.g. Marte flavigula).

== Honey development ==
In the Teraï, a region located at an altitude of 60 to 300 m (FAO), there are counts of about 120 000 colonies of A. cerana (Thapa, 2001). The flat land area with varieties of flowering plants have made honey-production successful in nooks and corners of Teraï region. The weather is moderate all year long. The log hives permit honey production from A. cerana.
