= Flax production in Nepal =

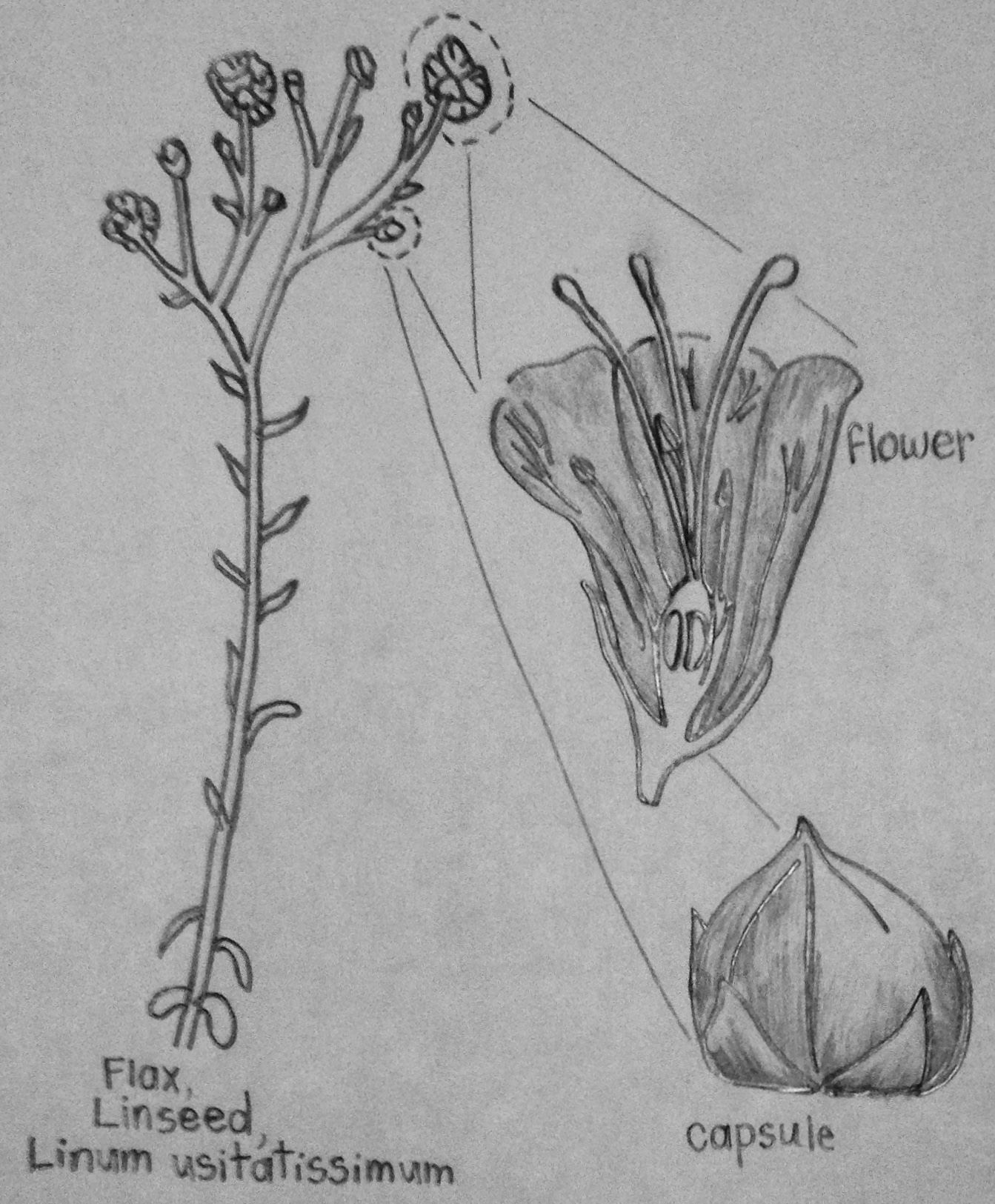
Flax plant, flower and capsule

The production of flax (Linum usitatissimum) and other oilseed crops peak in the temperate climates of the middle mountain and hill farming regions in Nepal. Flax matures in approximately 90 to 125 days and develops most rapidly under the cool, short season of growing. The middle hill region of the Lamjung district (the epicenter of the earthquake devastating Nepal in April 2015) exemplifies an ideal climate for flax production experiencing consistently cool temperatures for most of the year. The shallow rooting system makes the plant especially susceptible to drought and excess moisture in the soil but easier to harvest. Most cash crops are grown in the hill regions of Nepal as this is where two-thirds of the subsistence farmers reside, who need to produce just enough food to feed themselves and their families.

== Production ==
Oilseed production in Nepal was largely replaced by grain crops which contain a higher caloric value but requires higher labor and overall decrease in nutritional quality for the Nepalese. Flax production is seen to be increasing as Nepal's reported yields in 2012 are 5000 hectograms per hectare (Hg/Ha) and 5358 Hg/Ha in 2013 referring to a production quantity of 7500 tons and 7672 tons respectively. The cool and temperate climate of the mid-hill regions in Nepal present great potential for farmers to maximize their linseed yields and the yield of proceeding cash-crops through disease and pest control. The hill regions of the Lamjung district is less than 170 km from the capital of Nepal, Kathmandu, which represents an ideal market for trading of the flax seeds or any by-products of the crop made by Nepalese farmers and their families.

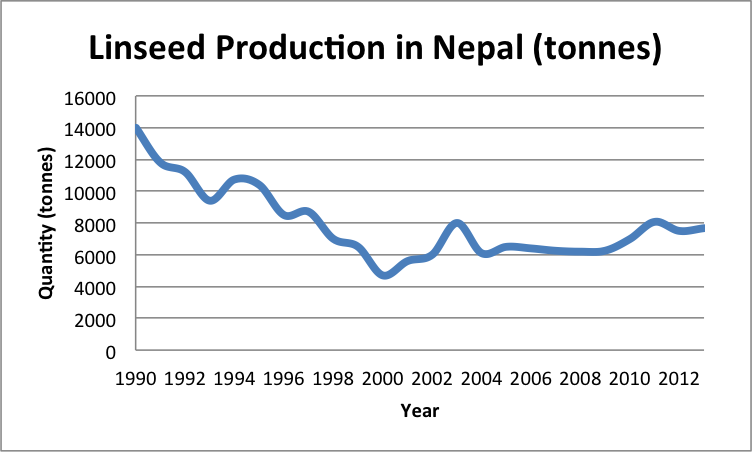

Graphed data from http://faostat.fao.org/

== Benefits of flax production ==
=== Crop rotation ===
Entering flax into the crop rotation reduces the prevalence of disease and pests as flax varieties are less susceptible to diseases such as Sclerotinia stem rot, flea beetles, and certain species of Fusarium that devastate cereal crops. Further use of flax production will increase the yields of other grain crash crops and provide Nepalese farmers with by-products for personal use or sale.

=== Whole flax straw ===
Whole flax straw holds great agricultural value to subsistence farmers. When left on the field, the straw will protect the soil from wind and water erosion and can be used as livestock bedding or mulch. Due to the topography of hills and mountains, run-off and erosion is of concern. Whole flax straw can help to alleviate and reduce the occurrence of this erosion. Additionally, remnants of straw and fiber remaining on the soil will return nutrients to the soil, increasing soil fertility and, in turn, increasing future cash crop yields.

Lastly, deforestation for fuel use is an ongoing issue in Nepal. By-products of flax harvest are used as a biofuel source in Canada; this methodology can be transposed in Nepal and lessen the need for the hill and mountain farmers to scavenge for wood-sourced fuels.

=== Flax fiber ===
There is world market demand for flax straw and fiber in environmentally friendly products, textiles, and biofuel. Farmers often maximize their cash returns in producing quality seed and neglect the production of whole straw and fiber––an excellent opportunity for Nepalese farmers to fill the niche market. Flax fiber can be used in textiles such as linen and cottonized flax, in pulp sweeteners, and insulation, where there is remarkable demand. Environmentally-friendly products are becoming more and more popular around the world. For example, plastic composites using flax fibers are continuing to become more popular in the modern world's automotive industry. Productions of composites require less energy than fiberglass to process and manufacture which results in a lighter vehicle that is more efficient.

=== Shive ===
Shive is the non-fibre parts of the stem and comprises anywhere from 70 to 85% of the total straw weight and therefore a major by-product of flax straw processing. It is destined for use in bio-fuel, mulch and animal bedding.

=== Nutrition ===
Flaxseed oil is high in alpha linoleic fatty acid (ALA) of which is important to human and animal nutrition. The flaxseed itself can be consumed by the general population. With its short maturation period and self-pollination, the crop can produce multiple cuts of straw and seeds. A versatile crop, flaxseed can be used in breads and cereals as well as oil for supplementation as it is a great source of micronutrients, ALA, and fiber.

== Potential drawbacks of flax production ==
=== Harvest ===
Harvesting whole flax straw and fiber can be a challenge. Whole flax straw is historically left in the field to decay over time or raked into piles and burned as it tends to clog farm equipment and thus makes collection difficult. As a result, harvest and post-harvest labor may be lengthy and time-consuming if the straw and fibers are constantly clogging the discs of the plow.

=== Transport and storage ===
Another challenge is the transport and storage of flaxseed once harvested. Purchasing price from manufacturers and processing plants is largely dependent on quality (there are few grading guidelines established in Canada). Although the climactic regions of Nepal are ideal for flax production, spoilage may be an issue with increased temperatures and humidity that may be associated with transport and time of season. Transporting the materials to Canada will come as a cost deduction in spot price to Nepalese farmers; this may ultimately determine the profitability of the crop to the farmer.
