= Mahakali Irrigation Project =

Nepalese irrigation project

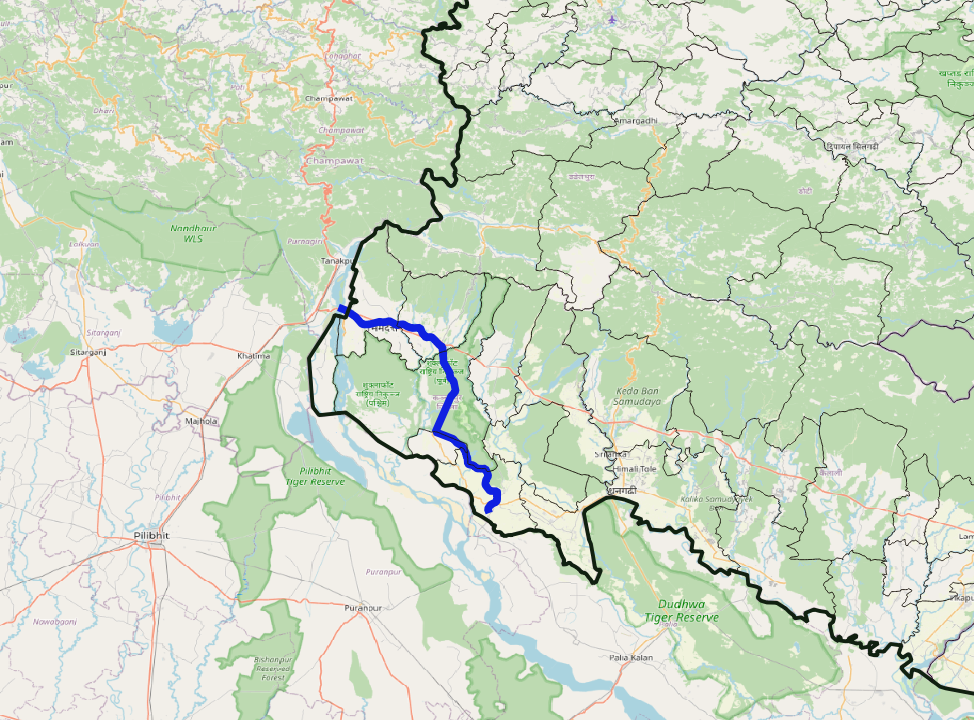
Mahakali Irrigation Canal

Mahakali Irrigation Project is one of the National Pride Projects of Nepal. Water from Mahakali river at Sarada barrage is diverted to irrigate the farms in Nepal side as per the Mahakali treaty. The command area lies in Kanchanpur and Kailali districts.

The headworks of the project is Sharada Barrage, which was constructed in 1928 by the British-Indian government.

The main canal of the project was constructed in 1975 with command area of 3,400. In 1976, International Development Association agreed for financing the project and an agreement was signed on September 29, 1980, with an implementation period of 5 years. The first Stage was completed in 1988.

The second stage was signed on November 18, 1988, between Nepal and the International Development Association. It was completed in 1997.

The third stage was proposed for development during the bilateral treaty (Mahakali treaty) between Nepal and India treaty called Treaty for Integrated Development of Mahakali Barrage including Sharada Barrage, Tanakpur Barrage and Pancheshwar Multi-purpose Project signed on February 12, 1996. As per the agreement, Nepal can draw 28.35 m3/s of flow from the Sharada Barrage during the wet season (from May 15 to October 15) and 4.25 m3/s in the dry season (from October 16 to May 14). The actual construction of the third stage was initiated by Nepal in 2006. The third stage comprises a 151 km long canal in Nepal side, of which the 28.5 km section of the canal has been completed as of 2023. The starting part of canal near the barrage, about 1 km long, lies inside the Indian border (in the land that was granted to British India during the treaty).
