= Ministry of Energy, Water Resources and Irrigation =

Government ministry of Nepal

Ministry of Energy, Water Resource and Irrigation
- ऊर्जा, जलस्रोत तथा सिँचाइ मन्त्रालय
- Emblem of Nepal

Ministry overview
- Preceding agencies: Ministry of Energy; Ministry of Irrigation
- Jurisdiction: Government of Nepal
- Headquarters: Singha Durbar, Kathmandu, Nepal
- Motto: निजामती सेवाको मान्यता: अनुशासन, इमान्दारिता र नैतिकता
- Minister responsible: Biraj Bhakta Shrestha, Cabinet Minister
- Ministry executive: Vacant, Secretary (Energy, Water Resources and Irrigation)
- Website: moewri.gov.np

The Ministry of Energy, Water Resources and Irrigation (Nepali: ऊर्जा, जलस्रोत तथा सिंचाइ मन्त्रालय) is a governmental body of Nepal that governs the development and implementation of energy including its conservation, regulation and utilization. It furthermore develops operates electricity projects including hydropower projects.

Due to the importance of water resources in Nepal, the ministry focuses on the development and utilization of hydropower. In 2018, under the Second Oli cabinet, the portfolio of the ministry was enlarged and the portfolios of Water Resources and Irrigation was added to the then Ministry of Energy, while the Ministry of Irrigation was discontinued.

== Organisational structure ==
=== Secretaraits ===
- Water and Energy Commission Secretariat (website)
  - Centre of Hydrology and Water Resources Research (website)

=== Departments ===
Department name	Website
Department of Electricity Development	(website)
Department of Water Resources and Irrigation	(website)

=== Organizations, boards and Centres ===
- Nepal Electricity Authority (website)
- Groundwater Resources Development Board (website)
- Alternative Energy Promotion Centre (website)
- Vidhyut Utpadan Company Limited (website)
- Rastriya Prasaran Grid Company Limited (website)
- Hydroelectricity Investment and Development Company Limited (website)

== See also ==
- Department of Water Resources and Irrigation
