= National Education Day (Nepal) =

National day in Nepal

National Education Day (Nepali: राष्ट्रिय शिक्षा दिवस, romanized: Rastriya Sikshya Diwas) is celebrated on 2 Ashoj annually in Nepal. The Education Day has been celebrated in Nepal since 2031 BS. It used to be observed on the 12 Falgun (late February) annually before Nepal was declared as a republic federation. After the declaration of federal republic in 062/063 BS, it was decided to celebrate on 8 September, coinciding with International Literacy Day. In 2075 BS, the date was revised by the Ministry of Education to celebrate the National Education Day 17 June based on the date of ratification of the law Compulsory and Free Education Act, 2018 (2075 BS).

The current day of 2 Asoj was decided in May 2023 by the cabinet. It is managed by Ministry of Education, Science and Technology (Nepal)
