= Upper Karnali Hydropower Project =

- Location within Nepal
- Official name: Upper Karnali Hydropower Project
- Location: Nepal
- Coordinates: 28°55′23″N 81°28′20″E
- Status: Proposed
- Construction began: unknown
- Opening date: 2024 (est.)
- Owner: Nepal Electricity Authority

Dam and spillways
- Type of dam: Gravity
- Impounds: Karnali River
- Height: 64 m (210 ft)
- Length: 207 m (679 ft)

Reservoir
- Surface area: 1.96 km²

Upper Karnali Hydropower Station
- Coordinates: 28°54′02″N 81°26′40″E
- Commission date: 2024 (est.)
- Type: Run-of-the-river
- Hydraulic head: 159.26 m (522.5 ft)
- Turbines: 8 x 112.5 MW Francis-type
- Installed capacity: 900 MW

The Upper Karnali Storage Hydropower Project is a proposed run-of-the-river hydroelectric plant on the Karnali river in Nepal. It will have an installed capacity of 900 MW, making it the largest hydropower plant in Nepal when achieved. However, most of the generated power is set to be exported to both Bangladesh (about 500 MW) and India (another 292 MW), via a 400 kV double circuit transmission line, with the only remaining 108 MW of total power dedicated to local consumption.

First planned in the 1990s as a smaller-scale 240 MW facility, the current 900 MW design was approved in 2008. A much larger 4,180 MW generation eventuality was identified on the same site during the feasibility studies, but this option was not selected. As of February 2020, the Power Purchase Agreement was hoped to be signed within 3 months, which might give a boost to the long-delayed project.

The expected cost of the dam is US$1.5 billion, partly funded by the Asian Development Bank, and its construction should employ an estimated 3,000 workers during 5 years.
