= Bheri Babai Diversion Multipurpose Project =

- Country: Nepal
- Location: Surkhet district
- Purpose: Power, Irrigation
- Status: Under construction
- Construction began: 2015
- Opening date: 2023
- Owners: Ministry of Energy, Water Resource and Energy

Dam and spillways
- Type of dam: Barrage type
- Impounds: Bheri River
- Height: 13 m (43 ft)
- Length: 6 x 15.30 m

Power Station
- Commission date: 2023
- Type: RoR
- Hydraulic head: 121.5 m (399 ft)
- Turbines: 3 Nos Francis-type
- Installed capacity: 46.73 MW

Bheri Babai Diversion Multipurpose Project (SUB2Axis64) is a multi-basin irrigation as well as hydropower project lying in Surkhet District of Karnali Province in Mid-West Nepal. The water is diverted from the Bheri River and discharged to Babai River. The project aims to irrigate 51,000 ha of land in Banke and Bardiya District throughout the year. The elevation difference between the intake and irrigation area provided an opportunity to install 46.8 MW firm electricity. The project has a tunnel 12208 meters long that was constructed using a tunnel boring machine (TBM) for the first time in Nepal. The project is owned by the Ministry of Energy, Water Resources and Irrigation. Construction of the project commenced in 2015 and was expected to be complete in 2023. The project is estimated to cost NPR 30,00,00,00,000.

As of June 2021, 45% of the construction work was completed.

== Project description ==
The headworks of the project is located in Chhote village of Lekhpharsa VDC on the right bank and Gothiyari village of Ramghat VDC on the left bank of the Bheri River. A diversion barrage across the Bheri will divert the flow to six intake orifices on the left bank of river. The flow is then conveyed to a three-bayed settling basin followed by a 12 km long headrace tunnel and 773 m long penstock pipe. A power station will be located on the right bank of the Babai River. The gross head of the project is 151 m while the design discharge is 40 m^{3}/s.

=== Contractors ===
- Tunnel: China Overseas Engineering Group Company (COVEC) and Robbins provided the TBM. The component was constructed ahead of schedule.
- Headworks and Powerhouse: Guangdong Yuantian Raman JV
- Electro-Mechanical works: Zhejiang Orient Engineering Co., Ltd.
- Hydro-Mechanical works: Zhejiang Orient Engineering Co., Ltd.

== See also ==
- National Pride Projects
- Department of Water Resources and Irrigation
- Interbasin transfer
