= Department of Water Resources and Irrigation =

Authority that manages and monitors different Irrigation Projects

Department of Water Resource and Irrigation
- जलस्रोत तथा सिंचाइ विभाग

Department overview
- Formed: 2009; 17 years ago
- Type: Irrigation development and mentinance
- Jurisdiction: Government of Nepal
- Status: Active
- Headquarters: Jawalakhel, Lalitpur, Nepal
- Annual budget: Nrs. 35.94 Billion (FY 2081/82)
- Director General responsible: Sanjeeb Baral
- Parent department: Ministry of Energy, Water Resources and Irrigation
- Website: www.dwri.gov.np

Department of Water Resources and Irrigation (Nepali: जलस्रोत तथा सिंचाइ विभाग) under Ministry of Energy, Water Resources and Irrigation is the authority to plan, develop, maintain, operate, manage and monitor different Irrigation Projects. It also works under the sector of Water Induced Disaster Management. Being a sector of paramount importance, the department accounts for a significant amount of National budget.

== History ==
Department of Irrigation was established in 2009 BS which later merged with Department of Water Induced Disaster Management in 2074 to form Department of Water Resources and Irrigation.

== Organization ==
The department and its branch offices are run by officers of Nepal Engineering Service (Civil/Irrigation).

The department has 52 irrigation management offices and project offices along with a few Mechanical Offices and Embankment Offices at central level. Bheri Babai Diversion Multipurpose Project and a few other projects also run under the department.

== See also ==
- Department of Roads
- Department of Urban Development and Building Construction
