= Mithila Solar PV Station =

Solar power station in Nepal

- Country: Nepal
- Location: Begadawar, Dhanusha District
- Coordinates: 26°56′05″N 85°56′24″E
- Status: Operational
- Construction began: 2020
- Commission date: 2021
- Owner: Eco Power Development Pvt. Ltd.

Solar farm
- Type: Standard PV
- Site area: 26.5 ha
- Feed-in tariff: NPR 7.5

Mithila Solar PV Station is a 10 MW solar station located at Dhanusha District, Province No. 2; Nepal. The plant is owned and run by Eco Power Development Pvt. Ltd., an IPP. The plant came in operation in February 2021.

== Operations ==
The station occupies an area of about 40 Bighas of land (approx. 26.5 hector). The station has 28,504 solar panels and three inverters to convert 660 DC to AC. The energy generated by the project is connected to the Dhalkebar substation. The generated electricity is sold to Nepal Electricity Authority at the rate of NPR 7.30 per kWh.

== See also ==
- List of power stations in Nepal
- Butwal Solar PV Project
- Nuwakot Solar Power Station
- Mithila 2 Solar PV Station
- Solar power in Nepal
