= Achutam Lamichhane =

Nepalese politician

Honourable Achutam Lamichhane
- अच्युतम लामिछाने

Member of Parliament, Pratinidhi Sabha
- Incumbent
- Assumed office 26 March 2026
- Preceded by: Arjun Narasingha KC
- Constituency: Nuwakot 2

Personal details
- Born: 12 November 1977 (age 49)
- Citizenship: Nepalese
- Party: Rastriya Swatantra Party (since 2026)
- Parent: Shiv Prasad Upadhyay (Lamichhane) (father)
- Education: Yong In University (Ph D); Tribhuvan University (IA)
- Profession: Politician

Achutam Lamichhane (Nepali: अच्युतम लामिछाने), also spelled as Achhutam Lamichhane or Achyutam Lamichhane is a Nepalese politician of Rastriya Swatantra Party, currently serving as a member of parliament. He was elected to the Pratinidhi Sabha, the lower house of the Federal Parliament of Nepal from the Nuwakot 2 parliamentary constituency in the 2026 Nepalese General Election. He secured 32,054 votes and defeated Jagadiswor Narsingh KC of the Nepali Congress.

== Personal life and education ==
Lamichhane was born in Nuwakot, on November 12, 1977. He was born to Shiv Prasad Upadhayay (Lamichhane). He completed his primary and secondary level education at Chandeshwari Secondary School in Bidur, Nuwakot, and Shree Nilkantha Secondary School in Bogatitar, Rasuwa. He moved to Kathmandu and completed his intermediate level studies in health and physical education at Mahendra Ratna Campus, Kathmandu, a college affiliated to Tribhuvan University.

In South Korea, he studied the Korean language at Jeonju University. He then completed his Bachelor's and Master's degree at Yong In University, South Korea. He is among the very few Nepalis, to earn a Ph. D in sports science.

== Politics ==
He began his political journey by joining the Rastriya Swatantra Party in 2022. He was elected president of the Bagmati province of the Rastriya Swatantra Party in 2023. He contested the 2026 Nepalese general election from the Nuwakot 2 constituency and won by a margin of 16,551 votes. He defeated former MP, constituent assembly member, and veteran leader Jagadiswor Narsingh KC of the Nepali Congress and Keshav Raj Pandey, former provincial assembly member of the CPN (UML).

== Electoral performance ==
Election	Year	Constituency	Contested for	Political party	Result	Votes	% of votes	Ref.
Nepal general election	2026	Nuwakot 2	Pratinidhi Sabha member	Rastriya Swatantra Party	Won	32,054	47.78%	
