= Chandranigahpur Solar Project =

Solar power station in Nepal

- Country: Nepal
- Location: Chandranigahapur , Rautahat District
- Coordinates: 27°07′12″N 85°22′17″E
- Status: Operational
- Construction began: 2020
- Commission date: 2021
- Owner: Api Power Company Pvt. Ltd

Solar farm
- Type: Standard PV
- Feed-in tariff: NPR 7.5

Chandranigahpur Solar Project is a 4 MW solar station located at Rautahat District, Province No. 2; Nepal. The plant is owned and run by Api Power Company Pvt. Ltd., an IPP. The plant came in operation in February 2021.

== Power Generation ==
Fiscal Year	2078/079	2079/080
०४ श्रावण	-	502890
०५ भाद्र	514630	525550
०६ असोज	533820	546470
०७ कार्तिक	532780	523610
०८ मंसिर	467790	412470
०९ पुस	366110	281590
१० माघ	375030	351290
११ फागुन	624160	446100
१२ चैत	566160	605580
०१ बैशाख	624160	531710
०२ जेठ	591720	655400
०३ असार	570100	462370
Total	5,766,460	5342140

== See also ==
- List of power stations in Nepal
- Butwal Solar PV Project
- Nuwakot Solar Power Station
- Dhalkebar Solar Power Station
- Solar power in Nepal
