= Solar power in Nepal =

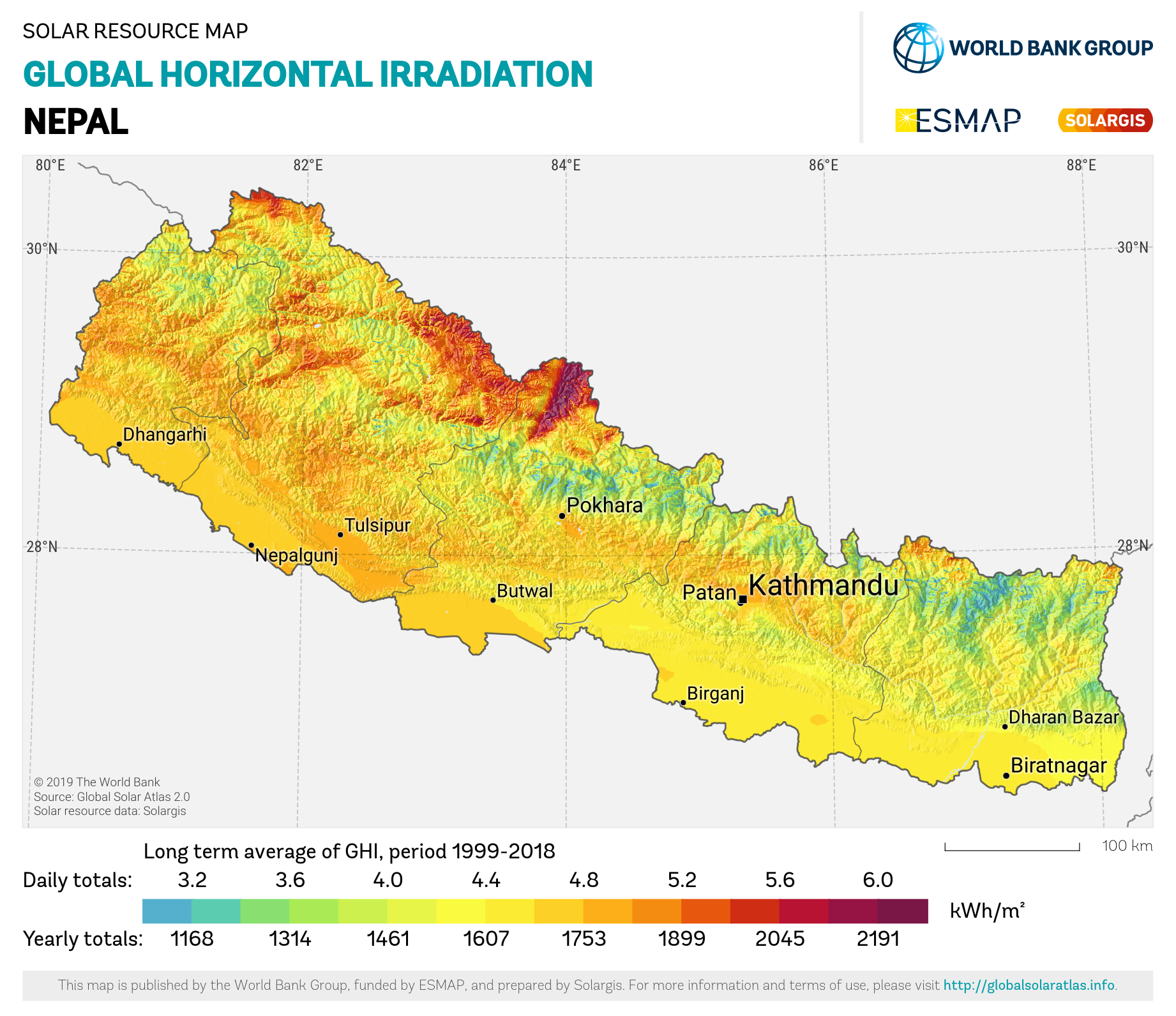
- Solar irradiation map of Nepal
- Installed capacity: 0.115 GW (2024) (96th)
- Annual generation: 0.034 TWh (2024)
- Capacity per capita: 0.0039 W (2024)
- Share of electricity: 0.15% (2024)

Nepal gets most of its electricity from hydropower sources, but it is looking to expand the role of solar power in its energy mix. The average global solar radiation in Nepal varies from 3.6 to 6.2 kWh/m^{2}/day. The sun shines for about 300 days a year. The number of sunshine hours amounts to almost 2100 hours per year, with an average of 6.8 hours of sunshine each day, and average insolation intensity of about 4.7 kWhm²/day.

Power cuts with an average of 10 hours per day in the past were common in Nepal, and the Nepal Electricity Authority used to publish a time table for power cuts. Solar energy can be seen as a more reliable source of energy in Nepal than the traditional electricity. Private installations of solar panels are more frequent in Nepal.

The people living in places such as Madi, Chitwan, where the Electricity Authority does not provide electricity because of Chitwan National Park, have been relying on solar power for several years.

In 2015, the World Bank agreed to invest 130 million dollars into the development of a 25MW solar power plant. They plan to connect it to the national power grid in the future. Construction of the plant began in April 2018 in the Nuwakot district. The project will serve the Kathmandu Valley upon completion.

In 2019, Nepal's Department of Electricity Development approved survey licenses for 21 locations to prepare for the possible installation of 56 solar plants, which could have a combined solar capacity of 317.14 MW. The largest planned solar energy project is a 120 MW solar PV station in Dhalkebar in Dhanusha district.

== Solar power stations ==
As of 4 March 2025

S.N.	Power station	Location	Capacity (MW)	Commissioned	Owner	Refs.
1	Nuwakot Solar Power Station	Bidur, Nuwakot	25.000	2020	Nepal Electricity Authority	
2	Mithila Solar PV Station	Begadawar (Dhanusha)	10.000	2021	Eco Power Development Pvt. Ltd	
3	Mithila 2 Solar PV Station	Dhanusha District	10.000	2022	Eco Global Power Development Pvt. Ltd	
4	Solar PV Project Banke, block-2	Raniyapur (Banke)	10.000	2080-01-18	Pure Energy Ltd	
5	Solar PV Project, Raniyapur, Block 1	Raniyapur (Banke)	10.000	2080-09-25	Pure Energy Ltd	
6	Shivasatachhi Jhapa Solar Project	Panchganchi (Jhapa)	10.000	2080-10-10	Jhapa Energy Limited	
7	Butwal Solar PV Project	Rupandehi	8.500	2020	Ridi Power Company Ltd.	
8	Utility Scale Solar PV, Grid Connected Solar Project, Morang	Banigama (Morang)	6.800	2079-12-30	G I Solar Pvt. Ltd,	
9	Bel Chautara Solar Farm Project	Khairenitar (Tanahu)	5.000	2078-07-01	Solar Farm Pvt. Ltd.	
10	Solar PV Pratappur, Grid Connected Solar PV (VGF), Nawalpara	Pratappur (Nawalparasi)	5.000	2079-05-27	National Solar Power Company PVt. Ltd.	
11	Som Radha Krishna Solar Farm Project (VGF)	Rupakot (Kaski)	4.400	2079-07-14	Nepal Solar Farm Ltd.	
12	Chandranigahpur Solar Project	Rautahat District	4.000	2078-05-06(2021)	Api Power Company Pvt. Ltd	
13	Grid-Connected Solar Power Project, Dhalkebar, 33 kV S/S	Dhalkebar (Dhanusha)	3.000	2078-11-21	Sagarmatha Energy & Construction Pvt. Ltd.	
14	Grid Connected Solar PV Project, Ramgram, Nawalparasi		2.000	2080-01-02	Saurya Bidhyut Power Pvt. Ltd	
15	Bishnu Priya Solar Farm Project	Ramnagar (Nawalparasi)	1.000	2075-08-13	Surya Power Company P. Ltd.	
16	Solar Power Project, Dhalkebar 11 kV S/S	Dhalkebar (Dhanusha)	1.000	2078-10-02	Api Power Company Ltd.	
17	Solar Power Project, Simara, 11 kV S/S		1.000	2079-04-08	Api Power Company Ltd.	
18	Solar Energy	Bungamati (Lalitpur)	0.680	2067-12-10	Katthmandu Upatyaka Khanepani Byawasthapan Board	
		Total	117.38			

=== Upcoming solar power projects ===
As of 7 September 2025

Solar power station	Capacity (MW)	Location	Commissioning year (planned)
Dhalkebar Solar PV Project	120	Mahottari District	2025
Barju Solar Project	50	Sunsari District	2025
Parwanipur Solar Farm	30	Bara District	2025
Total	200		

== See also ==
- Nepali: नेपालमा सौर्य ऊर्जा
