= Mithila 2 Solar PV Station =

Solar power station in Nepal

- Country: Nepal
- Location: Begadawar, Dhanusha District
- Coordinates: 26°56′05″N 85°56′24″E
- Status: Under Construction
- Construction began: 2022
- Construction cost: NPR 92 Crore
- Owner: Eco Global Power Development Pvt. Ltd.

Solar farm
- Type: Standard PV
- Feed-in tariff: NPR 7.5

Power generation
- Units operational: 2 × 4.5 MW and 1 × 1 MW
- Capacity factor: 10 MW

Mithila 2 Solar PV Station is a 10 MW solar power plant located at Dhanusha District, Madesh Province; Nepal. The plant is owned and under construction by Eco Global Power Development Pvt. Ltd., an IPP. The plant is planned to come in operation in February 2024.

The station occupies an area of about 35 Bighas of land (approx. 26.5 hector). The station has 28,504 solar panels, and three inverters to convert 690 DC to AC. The energy so generated by the project will be connected to the Dhalkebar Substation, which is about 1 Km from the plant. The generated electricity is planned to sell to Nepal Electricity Authority through PPA connecting to National Power Grid System.

== See also ==
- List of power stations in Nepal
- Butwal Solar PV Project
- Nuwakot Solar Power Station
- Solar power in Nepal
