= Puwa Khola-1 Hydropower Station =

- Location within Nepal
- Official name: Puwa Khola-1 Hydropower Project
- Country: Nepal
- Location: Ilam District
- Coordinates: 26°55′02″N 87°55′00″E
- Purpose: Power
- Status: Operational
- Owner: Puwa Khola - 1 Hydropower Pvt. Ltd

Dam and spillways
- Type of dam: Gravity
- Impounds: Puwa River

Power Station
- Commission date: 2074-06-23 BS
- Type: Run-of-the-river
- Installed capacity: 4 MW

Puwa Khola-1 Hydropower Station (Nepali: पुवा खोला जलविद्युत आयोजना) is a run-of-river hydro-electric plant located in Ilam District of Nepal. The flow from Puwa River, a tributary of Mai River is used to generate 4 MW electricity.

The plant is owned and developed by Puwa Khola - 1 Hydropower Pvt. Ltd, an IPP of Nepal. The plant started generating electricity from 2074-06-23BS. The generation licence will expire in 2105-06-20 BS, after which the plant will be handed over to the government. The power station is connected to the national grid and the electricity is sold to Nepal Electricity Authority.

== See also ==
- List of power stations in Nepal
