= Upper Puwa-1 Hydropower Station =

- Location within Nepal
- Official name: Upper Puwa-1 Hydropower Project
- Country: Nepal
- Location: Ilam District
- Coordinates: 26°59′47″N 87°54′10″E
- Purpose: Power
- Status: Operational
- Owner: Joshi Hydropower Co. P. Ltd

Dam and spillways
- Type of dam: Gravity
- Impounds: Puwa River

Power Station
- Commission date: 2071-10-01 BS
- Type: Run-of-the-river
- Installed capacity: 3 MW

Upper Puwa-1 Hydropower Station (Nepali: माथिल्लो पुवा-१ जलविद्युत आयोजना) is a run-of-river hydro-electric plant located in Ilam District of Nepal. The flow from Puwa River, a tributary of Mai River, is used to generate 3 MW electricity. The design flow is 4.46 m^{3} (158 cu ft) per second and design head is 125 m (410 ft).

The plant is owned and developed by Joshi Hydropower Co. P. Ltd, an IPP of Nepal. The plant started generating electricity from 2071-10-01BS. The generation licence will expire in 2105-02-05 BS, after which the plant will be handed over to the government. The power station is connected to the national grid and the electricity is sold to Nepal Electricity Authority.

== See also ==
- List of power stations in Nepal
