= Nuwakot 2 =

Parliamentary constituency in Bagmati Province, Nepal

- Parliamentary constituency
- Nuwakot 2 in Bagmati Province
- Province: Bagmati Province
- District: Nuwakot District

Current constituency
- Created: 1991
- Party: Rastriya Swatantra Party
- Member of Parliament: Achutam Lamichhane

Nuwakot 2 is one of two parliamentary constituencies of Nuwakot District in Nepal. This constituency came into existence on the Constituency Delimitation Commission (CDC) report submitted on 31 August 2017.

== Incorporated areas ==
Nuwakot 2 parliamentary constituency incorporates Kispang Rural Municipality, Meghang Rural Municipality, Tarkeshwar Rural Municipality, Bidur Municipality and Belkotgadhi Municipality.

== Assembly segments ==
It encompasses the following Bagmati Provincial Assembly segment

- Nuwakot 2(A)
- Nuwakot 2(B)

== Members of Parliament ==
=== Parliament/Constituent Assembly ===
| Election | Member | Party |
|---|---|---|
| 1991 | Ganesh Pandit | CPN (Unified Marxist–Leninist) |
| 1994 | Dr. Ram Sharan Mahat | Nepali Congress |
| 2017 | Narayan Prasad Khatiwada | CPN (Unified Marxist–Leninist) |
| May 2018 | Narayan Prasad Khatiwada | Nepal Communist Party |
| March 2021 | Narayan Prasad Khatiwada | CPN (Unified Marxist–Leninist) |
| 2022 | Arjun Narsingh K.C. | Nepali Congress |
| 2026 | Achutam Lamichhane | Rastriya Swatantra Party |

=== Provincial Assembly ===
==== 2(A) ====
| Election | Member | Party |
|---|---|---|
| 2017 | Keshav Raj Pandey | CPN (Unified Marxist–Leninist) |
| May 2018 | Keshav Raj Pandey | Nepal Communist Party |

==== 2(B) ====
| Election | Member | Party |
|---|---|---|
| 2017 | Hiranath Khatiwada | CPN (Maoist Centre) |
| May 2018 | Hiranath Khatiwada | Nepal Communist Party |

== Election results ==
=== Election in the 2020s ===
==== 2026 general election ====
| Candidate | Party | Votes | % |
|---|---|---|---|
| Achutam Lamichhane | Rastriya Swatantra Party | 32,054 | 47.78 |
| Jagadiswor Narsingh KC | Nepali Congress | 15,503 | 23.11 |
| Keshav Raj Pandey | CPN (UML) | 8,285 | 12.35 |
| Hiranath Khatiwada | Nepali Communist Party | 6,720 | 10.02 |
| Others | | 4,528 | 6.75 |
| Total | | 67,090 | 100.00 |
| Valid votes | | 67,090 | 95.23 |
| Invalid/blank votes | | 3,362 | 4.77 |
| Total votes | | 70,452 | 100.00 |
| Registered voters/turnout | | 123,939 | 56.84 |
| Majority | | 16,551 | |
| Rastriya Swatantra Party gain | | | |

==== 2022 general election ====
| Candidate | Party | Votes | % |
|---|---|---|---|
| Arjun Narasingha K.C. | Nepali Congress | 28,107 | 44.61 |
| Suman Bikram Pandey | Rastriya Swatantra Party | 16,477 | 26.15 |
| Narayan Prasad Khatiwada | CPN (UML) | 15,561 | 24.70 |
| Jhanak Pyakurel | Rastriya Prajatantra Party | 1,571 | 2.49 |
| Others | | 1,288 | 2.04 |
| Total | | 63,004 | 100.00 |
| Majority | | 11,630 | |
| Nepali Congress gain | | | |

=== Election in the 2010s ===
==== 2017 legislative elections ====
| Party | Candidate | Votes |
|---|---|---|
| CPN (Unified Marxist–Leninist) | Narayan Prasad Khatiwada | 36,892 |
| Nepali Congress | Arjun Narsingh K.C. | 26,335 |
| Others | | 1,830 |
| Invalid votes | | 4,770 |
| Result | CPN (UML) gain | |
Source: Election Commission

==== 2017 Nepalese provincial elections ====
===== Nuwakot 2(A) =====
| Party | Candidate | Votes |
|---|---|---|
| CPN (Unified Marxist–Leninist) | Keshav Raj Pandey | 20,009 |
| Nepali Congress | Jagadishwar Narsingh K.C. | 12,729 |
| Others | | 1,263 |
| Invalid votes | | 1,478 |
| Result | CPN (UML) gain | |
Source: Election Commission

===== Nuwakot 2(B) =====
| Party | Candidate | Votes |
|---|---|---|
| CPN (Maoist Centre) | Hiranath Khatiwada | 17,062 |
| Nepali Congress | Jagat Bahadur Tamang | 14,052 |
| Others | | 1,308 |
| Invalid votes | | 1,878 |
| Result | Maoist Centre gain | |
Source: Election Commission

==== 2013 Constituent Assembly election ====
| Party | Candidate | Votes |
|---|---|---|
| Nepali Congress | Dr. Ram Sharan Mahat | 18,831 |
| UCPN (Maoist) | Hit Bahadur Tamang | 15,233 |
| CPN (Unified Marxist–Leninist) | Shanta Thapa | 2,258 |
| Others | | 1,985 |
| Result | Congress hold | |
Source: NepalNews

=== Election in the 2000s ===
==== 2008 Constituent Assembly election ====
| Party | Candidate | Votes |
|---|---|---|
| Nepali Congress | Dr. Ram Sharan Mahat | 17,442 |
| CPN (Maoist) | Hit Bahadur Tamang | 17,338 |
| CPN (Unified Marxist–Leninist) | Binda Dhauna | 4,523 |
| CPN (Marxist–Leninist) | Ambika Kumari Dhakal | 1,649 |
| Rastriya Prajatantra Party | Krishna Bahadur Gurung | 1,346 |
| Others | | 1,246 |
| Invalid votes | | 2,894 |
| Result | Congress hold | |
Source: Election Commission

=== Election in the 1990s ===
==== 1999 legislative elections ====
| Party | Candidate | Votes |
|---|---|---|
| Nepali Congress | Dr. Ram Sharan Mahat | 18,889 |
| Rastriya Prajatantra Party | Dr. Prakash Chandra Lohani | 8,954 |
| CPN (Unified Marxist–Leninist) | Janardhan Bhandari | 6,313 |
| CPN (Marxist–Leninist) | Ganesh Pandit | 5,317 |
| Others | | 830 |
| Invalid Votes | | 1,154 |
| Result | Congress hold | |
Source: Election Commission

==== 1994 legislative elections ====
| Party | Candidate | Votes |
|---|---|---|
| Nepali Congress | Dr. Ram Sharan Mahat | 14,799 |
| Rastriya Prajatantra Party | Nar Bahadur Rai | 9,395 |
| CPN (Unified Marxist–Leninist) | Janardhan Bhandari | 8,008 |
| Samyukta Jana Morcha Nepal | Prakash Nepal | 420 |
| Result | Congress gain | |
Source: Election Commission

==== 1991 legislative elections ====
| Party | Candidate | Votes |
|---|---|---|
| CPN (Unified Marxist–Leninist) | Ganesh Pandit | 13,564 |
| Rastriya Prajatantra Party (Chand) | Jit Singh Khadka | 8,531 |
| Result | RPP (C) gain | |

== See also ==
- List of parliamentary constituencies of Nepal
