= Jagadiswor Narsingh KC =

Nepali politician and former Constituent Assembly member

Jagadiswor Narsingh K.C.
- जगदिश्वर नरसिंह केसी

Member of the Constituent Assembly of Nepal
- In office 2008–2017
- Constituency: Party List (Nepali Congress)

Personal details
- Born: 28 February 1964 (age 62) Nuwakot, Nepal
- Party: Nepali Congress
- Education: Tribhuvan University

Jagadiswor Narsingh KC (Nepali: जगदिश्वरनरसिंह केसी; also spelled Jagadish Narsingh KC or Jagadiswar Narsingh KC; born February 28, 1964) is a Nepali politician and social activist affiliated with the Nepali Congress party. He previously served as the Member of Parliament (MP) from Nuwakot District and was a member of both the first and second Constituent Assemblies of Nepal.

KC has continuously advocated for anti-corruption measures and accountability in the government and the party. He has persistently and strongly supported measures in development of infrastructure, education and health in national projects, as well as, in the Nuwakot district.

== Early life and education ==
KC, who represented the Nepali Congress in the Constituent Assembly twice, holds a bachelor's degree in political science. A native of Rautbesi, Nuwakot, KC began his political career in 2032 B.S. as the student president while he was a at Shanti Vidyagriha. He then continuously engaged in the democratic movement, actively participating in the national referendum, satyagraha, and the movements of 2046 and 2062–63. During this period, he spent nearly six months in jail in 2042, 2046, and 2062–63. In the meantime, he also remained underground for three months.

== Political career ==
K.C. began his political career during his student days. While studying in high school, he served as the Nepal Student Union (NSU) unit president at Shanti Vidyagriha. Later, while holding the position of NSU secretary at Saraswati College, he became the only winning candidate from his panel and secured the highest number of votes. In 2048 B.S., he was elected as a central member of the Nepal Student Union through an election held in Butwal. In the same year, he also became a General Committee member of the Nepali Congress and a member of the District Committee. In 2049 B.S., he became a member of the District Development Committee, and in 2051 B.S., he was elected District Vice-president. In 2056 B.S., he was elected General Secretary. He was elected President of the Nepali Congress Nuwakot District Committee four consecutive times in 2057, 2061, 2069, and 2073 B.S. During this period, he was also nominated as a member of the NSU Central Election Board based in Biratnagar.

In the Constituent Assembly elections, he was elected as a Member of Parliament in 2008 and 2013. During his tenure as an MP, he served as a Member of the Parliamentary Working Committee, the State Affairs Committee, the Sudan Scam Investigation Committee, the Constitution Drafting Committee, and was also active in the Finance Committee.

=== Political Leadership ===
During the 2036 B.S. incident at Amrit Science Campus, he was assaulted, and during the 2042 B.S. satyagraha, he was imprisoned in Hanumandhoka Jail. In the first People's Movement of 2046 B.S., he was arrested and detained in Bhadra Jail for 2 months, during which he also suffered serious injuries. After the success of the movement, he was released along with other senior leaders. On the 10th of Mangsir, 2060 B.S., under his leadership, the Nepali Congress District Committee of Nuwakot made history by officially declaring its support for republicanism. During the Second People's Movement (2062/2063 B.S.), he was appointed the commander of the Gongabu rally and led the movement continuously for 19 days. During this period, he was shot on the 29th of Falgun and sustained serious injuries, and his family members were also harassed by security personnel. Despite repeated arrests and harassment, he did not abandon the movement and continued to lead protest programs in the Gongabu–Balaju area. After the success of the movement, he personally arranged, with party funds, the repair of damaged doors and windows of houses affected during the protests. He was active in the Sudan Scam Investigation Committee, which resolved a major case by determining the involvement of high-ranking police officials, including four former Inspectors General of Police. While in the Finance Committee, he played a role in forming an investigation committee on tax evasion and revenue fraud committed by Ncell.

== District leadership and initiatives ==
KC was elected as president of the Nepali Congress (NC) party Nuwakot District Committee in 2016, defeating Ramesh Mahat. This was his fourth stint as the Nuwakot district president. In 2018, he hosted the gathering of NC district presidents held in Kakani, Nuwakot, which was convened to forge a common position on proposed amendments to the party statute ahead of the Maha Samiti meeting.

On 1 January 2019, KC led a delegation of Nuwakot lawmakers who met with Prime Minister K.P. Oli to request medical support to citizens injured during the 2017 general elections. He also submitted a petition to the Ministry of Physical Infrastructure and Transport regarding the repair of access roads to Nuwakot during the monsoon season.

On 2 September 2023, KC delivered a memorandum to Prime Minister Pushpa Kamal Dahal at Baluwatar. Among the demands were scientific arrangement of landfill operations and full blacktopping of the Tinpiple–Pipaltar road. KC warned of staging a hunger strike at the federal Parliament if these enduring issues remained unaddressed.

== Positions and political views ==
At a party program in 2020, KC criticised party President Sher Bahadur Deuba's leadership style stating that the party Presidents autocratic and undemocratic nature was harming the public opinion of the party. He also argued that the Nepali Congress should curb factionalism and select leadership on the basis of performance and public service rather than cronyism.

In August 2025, KC expressed the view that the Nepali Congress should take the lead in forming an alternative government. He stated that the country was facing a crisis marked by corruption, disregard for the rule of law, and political instability, and therefore required decisive leadership from the Nepali Congress.

On 31 July 2025, KC hosted a summit for political cooperation and dialogue in the occasion of 'kheer diwas' (rice-pudding day). The program was focused on cross-party compromise, which included Former Health and Education Minister Arjun Narasingha KC, Former Finance and Foreign Minister Prakash Chandra Lohani, Former Home Minister Bal Krishna Khand and other prominent party leaders.

In the lead up to the 15th general convention of the NC, KC publicly criticized the party leadership and direction. He stated that without major reforms including timely elections, anti-corruption measures and increased opportunities for youth leadership from the status quo that the party would face challenges in the upcoming elections.
