= Rautbesi =

Rautbesi राउतबेशी
- Village development committee
- Location in Nepal
- Coordinates: 27.92°N 85.42°E
- Country: Nepal
- Zone: Bagmati Zone
- District: Nuwakot District

Population (1991)
  - Total: 3,049
- Time zone: UTC+5:45 (Nepal Time)

Rautbesi is a village development committee in Nuwakot District in the Bagmati Zone of central Nepal. At the time of the 1991 Nepal census it had a population of 3049 people living in 597 individual households.

== Notable people ==
- Arjun Narsingh KC
- Kedar Narsingh KC
