= Panauti Hydropower Station =

- Location within Nepal
- Official name: Panauti Hydropower Station
- Country: Nepal
- Location: Kavre District
- Coordinates: 27°33′47″N 85°32′10″E
- Purpose: Power
- Status: Operational
- Owner: Nepal Electricity Authority

Power Station
- Type: Run-of-the-river
- Installed capacity: 2.4 MW

Panauti Hydropower Station (also called Khopasi Hydropower Station) is the third hydropower station which was constructed in Nepal, in 1965. It is the first megawatt (MW) capacity hydropower station in Nepal.

It is a run-of-the-river hydroelectric plant on the Roshi Khola river. This power station is located at Khopasi, Kavre district, 35 km east of Kathmandu and 7 km south-east from Panauti Bazar.

It was built in 1965 with the assistance from then Soviet Union at a cost of NRs 27 million. It has a capacity of 2.4 MW, from 3 units of 0.8 MW each and annual design generation of 6.97 GWh. The Project was designed for operation of only two units at a time with third unit as a standby. Open canal of 3,721 m long with discharge of 3.2 cu. m/s from headwork to reservoir has seven (7) outlet gates for irrigation in the vicinity of Khopasi.

After the major improvement activities accomplished in 2018/019 ( Rehabilitation and Modernization of Switchyards of Panauti Hydropower Station located at Khopasi and Bhakatpur ), Panauti Hydropower Station is generating maximum annual energy (in 2018/19) which the power plant had not been able to do since the last 11 years.

Hydropower name	Panauti Hydropower Station
Commissioned year	1965
Type	Run of River
Location	Panauti Municipality–12, Khopasi
Installed capacity	2.4 MW
Annual average energy	6.97 GWh
Maximum Net head Catchment area	66m /60m
Average annual flow	3.2m^3/s
Live storage volume Dam	50,000 m3
Total length of the waterways	3.721 km
Penstock turbine	1 No., 370m long, 1.4m
Numbers of Turbine /type	3/ Horizontal Francis
Rated discharge/ Turbine	1.61m3/s
Rated output / Turbine	0.85MW
Rated speed	1000 rpm
Generator Rated output	1000 kVA
Rated voltage	6.3 kV
Rated frequency	50 Hz
Power factor	0.8
Power transformer	1550 kVA, 6.3 kV/33 kV, 3 phase, 2 Nos.
Transmission line	33kV, 20 km, single circuit
