= Devighat Hydropower Station =

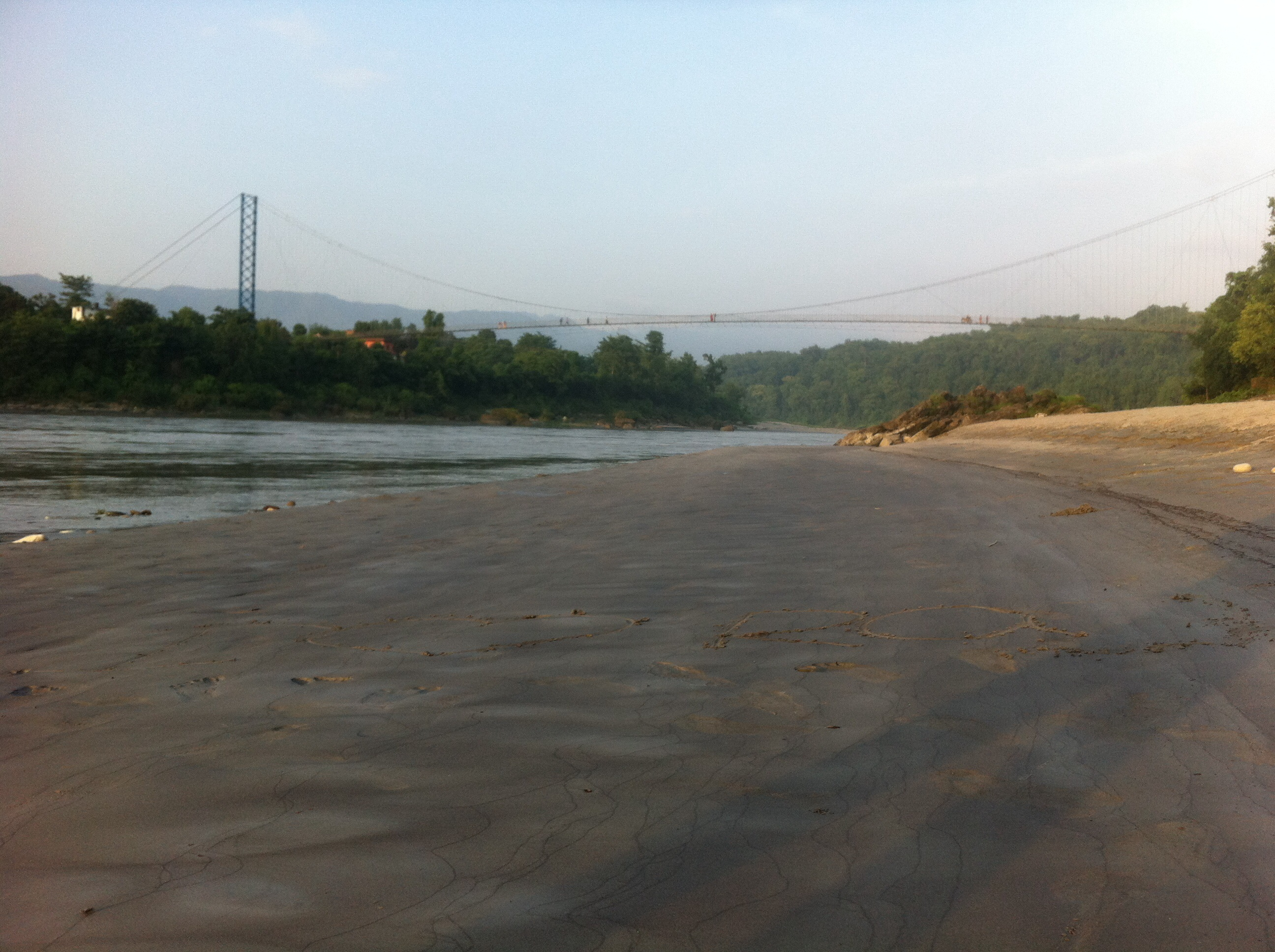

- Location within Nepal
- Country: Nepal
- Location: Nuwakot
- Coordinates: 27.8881907°N 85.1340051°E
- Purpose: Power
- Status: Operational
- Opening date: 1984
- Owner: Nepal Electricity Authority

Trishuli Hydropower Station
- Coordinates: 27.8881907°N 85.1340051°E
- Commission date: 1984
- Type: RoR
- Hydraulic head: 40.5 m (133 ft)
- Turbines: 3 Nos. Vertical Francis
- Installed capacity: 14.1 MW

Devighat Hydropower Station is a 14.1 MW cascade project of Trishuli Hydropower Station. The station is located at Devighat, Bidur Municipality in Nuwakot, Nepal. The plant was commissioned in 1984. The plant was developed jointly by the Government of India and the Government of Nepal. The project cost was NPR 750 Million. The plant was overhauled in 2011 to regain efficiency. The design flow is 45.66 m^{3}/s and the rated head is 40.5 m.

The plant was damaged during the 2026 Nepal floods. Transmission line, High-tension Line and Power cable as well as Entire Infrastructure damaged as per source. Devighat Power Station was built with the support of the Government of India. During this disaster it is big loss in Power Investments and Infrastructure. Multiple employees were reported missing due to the flooding.

== See also ==
- Nepal Electricity Authority
