= Arjun Narasingha KC =

Former Nepali Minister and Professor

Honourable Arjun Narasingha KC
- अर्जुन नरसिंह केसी
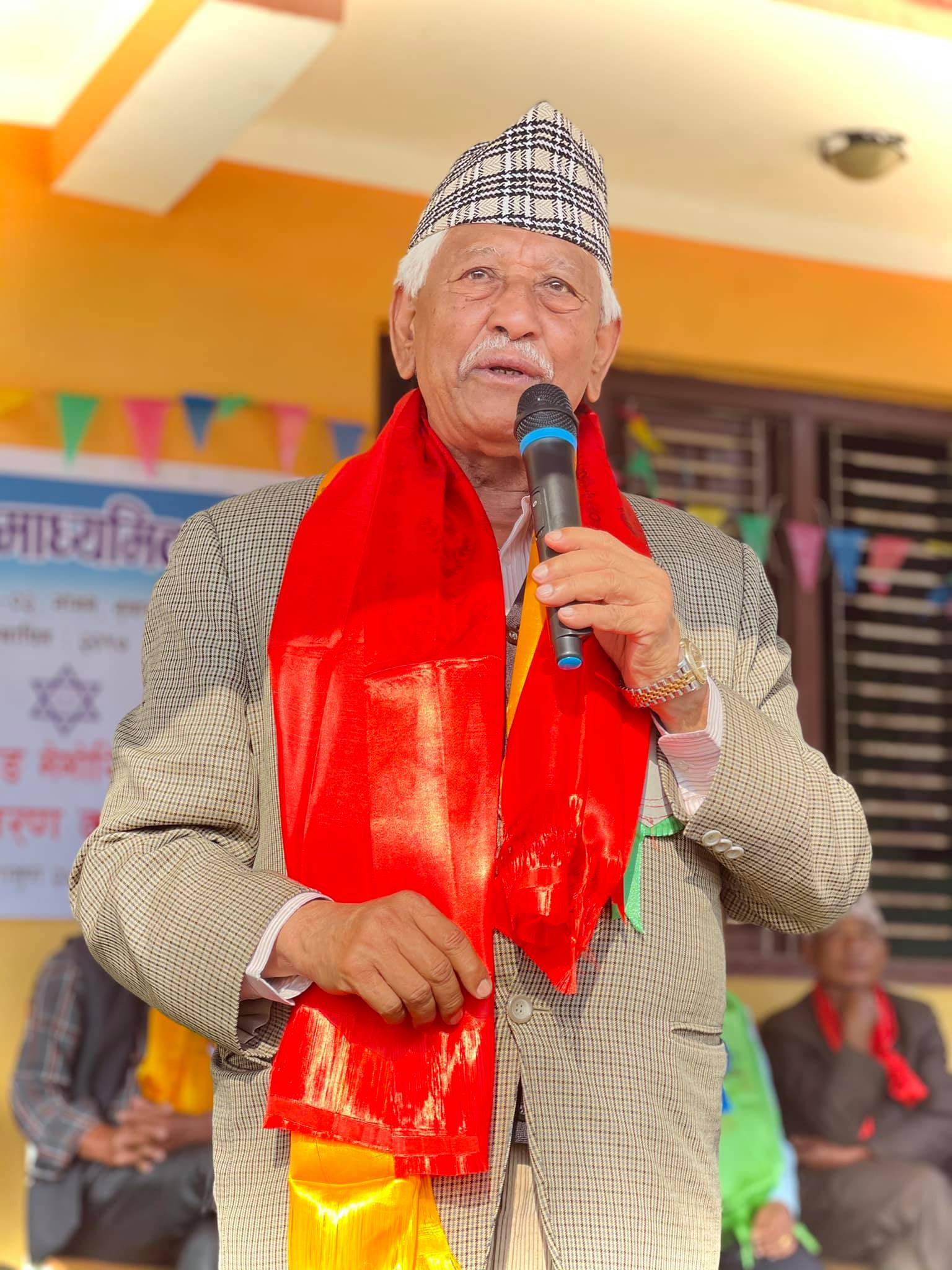
- KC in 2021

Minister of Urban Development
- In office 26 August 2016 – 31 May 2017
- Preceded by: Narayan Khadka
- Succeeded by: Prabhu Sah

Minister of Education and Minister of Housing & Physical Planning
- In office 15 April 1998 – 31 May 1999
- Prime Minister: Girija Prasad Koirala
- Preceded by: Kul Bahadur Gurung
- Succeeded by: Yog Prasad Upadhaya

Minister of Health and Population
- In office 22 September 1995 – 12 March 1997
- Prime Minister: Sher Bahadur Deuba
- Preceded by: Padma Ratna Tuladhar
- Succeeded by: Radha Krishna Mainali

State Minister of Health and Population
- In office 10 October 1982 – 3 July 1983
- Prime Minister: Surya Bahadur Thapa
- Preceded by: Birendra Bahadur Singh
- Succeeded by: Omkar Prasad Gauchan
Parliamentary offices
Member of the Pratinidhi Sabha
Incumbent
Assumed office 25 March 2026
Constituency	Party List (Nepali Congress)
In office 22 December 2022 – 12 September 2025
Preceded by	Narayan Khatiwada
Succeeded by	Achuttam Lamichhane
Constituency	Nuwakot 2
In office October 1994 – May 1999
Preceded by	Constituency established
Succeeded by	Mahendra Bahadur Pandey
Constituency	Nuwakot 3
Member of the Legislature Parliament
In office 21 January 2014 – 14 October 2017
Preceded by	Bimala Subedi
Succeeded by	Narayan Khatiwada
Constituency	Nuwakot 1

Personal details
- Born: 27 September 1947 (age 79) Nuwakot, Nepal
- Party: Nepali Congress
- Spouse: Pratima KC
- Children: 5
- Parent(s): Bhagwan Singh (father); Yasoda Devi KC (mother)
- Education: Tribhuvan University (LLB)(M.A.)
- Website: arjunnarasinghakc.com

Arjun Narasingha KC (Nepali: अर्जुन नरसिंह केसी) (born 27 September 1947), also known as ANKC, is a Nepali politician and former professor, currently serving as a member of the Pratinidhi Sabha representing the Nepali Congress. KC has served as minister in various coalition governments holding Education, Health, Housing & Physical Planning and Urban Development portfolios.

Following the 14th General Convention of the Nepali Congress, KC was elected senior leader in the party's Central Executive Committee, advocating for anti-corruption laws, transparency and accountability in the parliament and within the party. He was subsequently re-elected following his support for the 2nd special convention of Nepali Congress held on 10 January 2025. He previously also served as Joint General Secretary and spokesperson of the party.

== Early life and education ==
Arjun Narasingha KC was born on 27 September 1947 to Bhagwan Singh KC and Yasoda Devi KC in Rautbesi, Nuwakot.

KC holds a LLB, as well as, a master's degree in political science both from Tribhuwan University, Kathmandu, Nepal. Prior to entering politics, he was a Professor and Head of the Political Science department at the Tribhuvan University and also a practicing advocate.

In addition, he completed a fellowship at Tufts University, Fletcher School of Diplomacy, Boston, USA in International Relations and Foreign Policy decision making in 1982.

== Political career ==
=== Early activism and student leadership ===
KC first entered the political arena being elected as the General Secretary of Shanti Vidya Griha High School from 1961 to 1963. At the age of 15, while still a student, he was imprisoned for the first time due to his involvement in democratic activism. Over the course of his life, he served a total of six years and nine months in prison for his steadfast commitment to democratic principles.

He then served subsequently as the Vice Chairperson and Chairperson of National (currently known as Shanker Dev Campus) from 1964 to 1967.In 1973, he was elected as the Central Member of the Democratic Socialist Youth League convened by the NC in Varanasi.

KC led the Student Rally Coordination Committee, a student assembly organizing committee formed by BP Koirala before the establishment of the Nepal Student Union (NSU), where Ram Chandra Poudel and Sher Bahadur Deuba, were appointed as members. He is a founding member and coordinator of the NSU. At the instructions of the senior Congress leadership, KC ran and won a seat in the 1981 Rastriya Panchayat Election, contesting as an independent. KC first served as the State Minister for Health under Surya Bahadur Thapa from 1982 to 1983 and then as the Minister for Health, Education and Physical Planning from 1995 to 1999. KC was elected as a member of parliament twice in the 1991 and 1994 parliamentary elections.

=== Bangladesh Liberation War (1971) ===
During the 1971 Bangladesh Liberation War, KC, as a student leader, played a significant role in supporting the Bangladeshi independence movement. Under the leadership of BP Koirala, the Nepali Congress purchased and stored arms in Varanasi, India, which KC helped supply to the Mukti Bahini. This effort was part of a broader strategy by the Nepali Congress to align with Bangladesh's fight for independence, viewing it as a means to advance their own movement for parliamentary democracy in Nepal. Between 2011 and 2013, Bangladesh conferred the Bangladesh Freedom Honour on 335 individuals to recognize their significant contributions. A national committee, comprising ministers, civil servants, and civil society representatives, was established to identify these distinguished "Friends of Bangladesh". KC was awarded the Honour for his role in the independence movement.

=== Minister of Health and Population (1995–1997) ===
In 1996, KC played a critical role in the overhaul of the Nepali healthcare system aimed at getting the surplus of doctors in urban areas to move out into the understaffed hill and terai regions. Contemporary reporting in ''The Lancet'' noted strong incentives, more rapid promotion, and increased allowances and training opportunities for those working in underserved regions of Nepal. In addition, stricter enforcement of promotion criteria, and limitation of "kaaj"-the oft-used loophole by which a doctor posted to the hills could arrange a return to the city on a temporary but indefinite transfer. The new legislation restricted this practice to one month per year. In addition, the parliament passed several key pieces of health legislation during this period. These included the Nepal Nursing Council Act, 2052 (1996), which established a regulation body for nurses in Nepal; the B.P. Koirala Memorial Cancer Hospital Act, 2053 (1996), creating the country's national cancer referral center; the Nepal Health Professional Council Act, 2053 (1997), which covered allied health professions; the Nepal Health Service Act, 2053 (1997), which governed the recruitment, deployment and promotion within the national healthcare system. The Nepal Health Service Rules (1999) later codified the provisions on postings and transfers of healthcare professionals.

Moreover, KC focused on public health programs for prevention and as such National Immunization Days against polio were conducted annually from 1996, covering ~3.3 million children under-five each year. Nepal's polio programme reported >80% coverage in 1996–1998.

KC had expressed cautious support for private-sector involvement in healthcare while prioritising public service programs. In discussions with development partners, KC argued that foreign donor funding should focus on district and rural health services rather than private care. KC emphasised investment in training health personnel and stated that donor-supported projects would be welcomed if they resulted in more qualified staff.

=== Minister of Education (1998–1999) ===
KC was once again appointed as the Minister of Education, in the Second GP Koirala Cabinet. KC significantly advanced the recognition of Nepali educational qualifications by facilitating agreements with foreign countries to ensure the equivalence of Nepali degrees for international higher education. His efforts enabled Nepali students to pursue further studies abroad more effectively, overcoming previous challenges where Nepali degrees were often deemed outdated or unrecognized for foreign academic purposes.

In 1998, the old neoclassical garden in Keshar Mahal was to be demolished for the construction of a commercial center. However, KC on the advice of Karna Shakya stopped the demolition work at once and declared it open to the public with a new name, Garden of Dreams.

In 1999, KC was nominated as the Chief of the International Relation Department of the Nepali Congress party. On 25 September 2000, KC was appointed as the spokesperson of the NC by then party president Girija Prasad Koirala.

=== Role during the 2006 Pro-Democracy movement ===
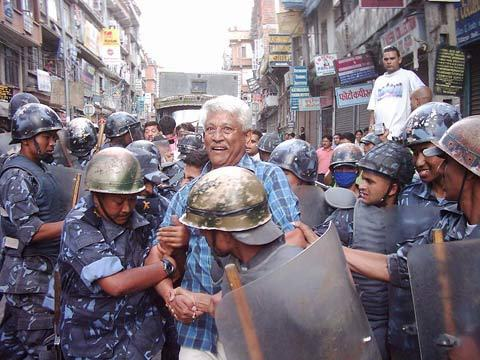
Ex-King Gyanendra arrested prominent leaders such as KC during the 2006 People's Movement

KC was the Coordinator of Kathmandu Valley on behalf of NC in Seven Party Alliance (SPA) for People's Movement against the direct rule of Former King Gyanendra.

On 16 February 2005, Nepali Police arrested KC at the party office in Sanepa for the first time since the king clamped a state of emergency and banned protests, detained key party leaders and suspended fundamental rights. KC spent three months in prison before being released and he was arrested again a week after while attending a party meeting in Banke, Nepal.

KC was appointed as the Joint-General Secretary by GP Koirala after the 11th General Convention of the Nepali Congress, which was held in Kathmandu in August 2005.

After the King announced the restoration of the dissolved House of Representatives on 24 April 2006, KC called the decision "the victory of the people's movement," echoing the SPA's public stance as protests wound down. The political backdrop to these events was the SPA–Maoist 12-point memorandum of understanding of November 2005, which set the roadmap for ending autocratic monarchy and restoring multiparty democracy.

=== Federal republic era ===
KC was a candidate from Nuwakot 1 (constituency) in the 2008 Nepali Constituent Assembly election but lost to CPN (Maoist) candidate Bimala Subedi. On 21 September 2010, KC was elected for the third time as the Central Committee member in the 12th General Convention of the Nepali Congress, securing the second highest votes - 2,034 out of 3,087 votes cast.

The first constituent assembly was dissolved due to its failure to promulgate the constitution in time. The second constituent assembly elections were held on 19 November 2013. Once again, KC placed his candidacy from Nuwakot 1 and was elected with a margin of over 8,000 votes against UCPN (Maoist) candidate Bimala Subedi.

During the constitutional discussions, KC reaffirmed his support for federalism. In 2014, he openly declared his party's commitment to a seven‑state federal model, emphasizing the importance of decentralized governance in meeting the aspirations of diverse communities.

=== Minister of Urban Development (2016–2017) ===
During his stint at the Ministry of Urban Development, KC played a strong role in promoting sustainable development goals while formulating the fiscal program for the upcoming year. On 23 April 2017, KC instituted the People's Housing Program with the goal of providing 25,000 homes to the disadvantaged communities outside the valley.

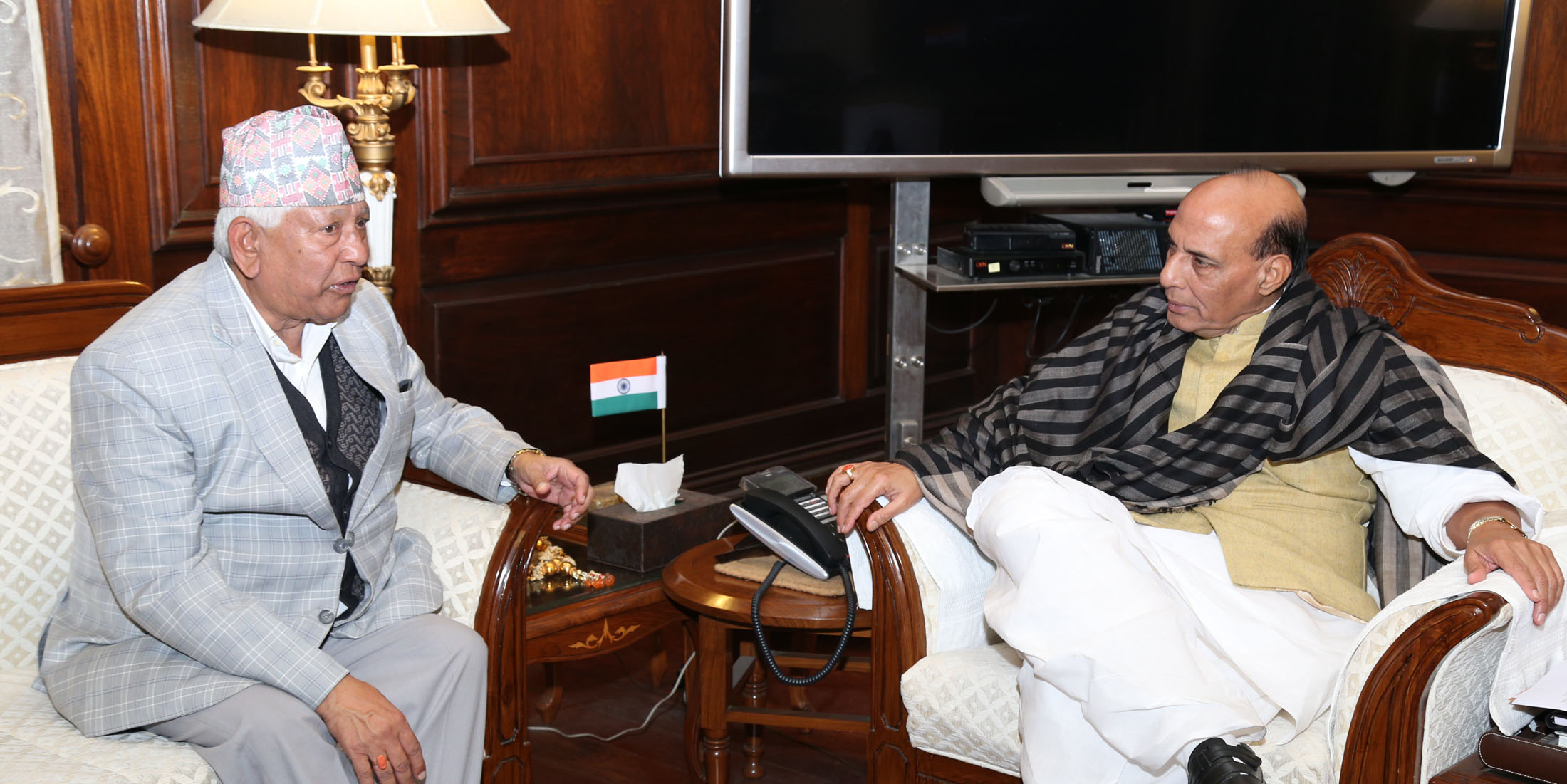
Urban Development Minister KC with the Indian Home Minister, Rajnath Singh, in 2016

In addition, on 26 April 2017, KC gave the final nod to begin the construction of the outer ring road in Kathmandu to make urbanization more systematic. The proposed 71.93 km road was shelved for over 13 years due to political infighting and corruption. The first phase of the construction of the outer ring road will commence along 6.6 km Chobhar-Gamcha-Satungal stretch from the forthcoming fiscal and cover approximately 8,000 ropanis of land area belonging to over 14,000 landowners. Of the total length of the ring road, Kathmandu, Lalitpur and Bhaktapur will have a coverage of 35.08 km, 15.80 km and 21.05 km respectively.

Moreover, KC also authored the foreword to Nepal's National Report to the UN's Habitat III Conference in Quito on 18 October 2016, outlining priorities for sustainable and systematic urbanization. In his address, he reaffirmed Nepal's commitment to fostering inclusive and sustainable cities. KC emphasized the importance of building disaster-resilient infrastructure in response to the 2015 Nepal earthquakes, advocating for the "build-back-better" principle as a core principle of Nepal's reconstruction strategy.

=== Political activities (2017–2022) ===
He lost in the 2017 elections to CPN-UML and CPN (Maoist Centre) common candidate Narayan Khatiwada.

In November 2020, when the government moved to remove the phrase "Federal Democratic Republic" from Nepal's official name, KC criticized the effort. He described it as "an unfortunate and bad omen," noting that it was in violation of Article 4 of the 2015 Constitution.

In the 14th General Convention, KC played a leading role forming the Koirala-KC-Thapa camp in preparation for the party elections. KC was once again elected to the Central Working Committee with 2,650 votes, during the 14th General Convention. On 28 January 2022, KC was nominated to the Central Executive Committee, consisting of the top leadership of the Congress Party, by party president Sher Bahadur Deuba.

On 17 February 2022, KC released a book 'Brief History of the Nepali Congress' at the official residence of the Prime Minister in Baluwatar. PM Deuba launched the book and expressed the view that all the citizens should read the book written by KC, saying the book would be a guideline to anyone who wanted to know about the party's history.

=== House of Representatives (2022–2025) ===
At the 2022 general election, KC won Nuwakot 2 as the candidate of Nepali Congress, securing 28,107 votes to defeat Rastriya Swatantra Party candidate Suman Bikram Pandey by a margin of over 11,000 votes.

==== Role in House of Representatives (HoR) ====
===== Public Accounts Committee (PAC) =====
KC currently serves on the House of Representatives' PAC. In June 2024, the PAC formed two subcommittees to investigate suspected irregularities in the construction of the Pokhara and Gautam Buddha (Bhairahawa) international airports; a 12-member panel included KC among its members. In April 2025, the Pokhara Airport subcommittee found significant corruption, citing amounts up to Rs. 14 billion, KC argued there was evidence of corruption from the outset and supported implementing the report's findings.

In January 2025, at a PAC meeting, KC stated there had been illegal bargaining going on for the approval of a new stock exchange. He urged his fellow committee members to be informed regarding such backroom deals.

===== Legislative positions =====
In June 2024, KC criticized the government budget for FY 2081/2082 describing it as "ambitious" and "beyond reality". He condemned the distributive nature of the budget and urged the government to heed the advice of the private sector for economic growth.

In August 2024, KC urged the government to reconsider a proposed provision to amend the Prevention of Corruption Act (2002), which would have placed a five-year time limit on corruption investigations, warning this would undermine good governance. He proposed the formation of a powerful commission consisting of former Chief Justices of Nepal to probe irregularities and scandals that have plagued the government.

Moreover, in May 2025, during the appropriation bill debate, KC stressed that the new budget must reflect the aspirations and act beyond just revenue and expenditure. KC suggested that policies and programmes for the upcoming fiscal year should be focused on ensuring the financial security of the marginalized communities and the people living below the absolute poverty line by focusing on social justice. He criticized the budget stating that a large percentage of capital expenditure was focused on a handful of districts instead of addressing the needs of the country as a whole.

On 28 June 2025, after the devastating 2025 Nepal floods, at a session of parliament, KC reiterated the need for disaster prevention and risk management citing Nepal's geography places it at a high risk for floods and landslides. He also pointed out the need for better coordination between the different levels of government, federal, provincial and local, to optimize rescue efforts and help those in need of immediate relief.

==== Party Organization and Engagement ====
KC, although a key member in the 14th General Convention of the anti-establishment camp, reiterated that if Gagan Thapa and Shekhar Koirala were to act independently then he would not support them in the upcoming general convention. On 12 December 2023, KC hosted a three-hour long meeting between the two to facilitate dialogue to sort out key political differences.

On 11 June 2024, at a party program held to commemorate the 15th memorial day of Shailaja Acharya, KC urged fellow NC leaders to adhere by rules and the party constitution. He emphasized the need to solve intra-party problems through dialogue to further strengthen the party unity.

On 3 July 2025, KC strongly criticized the party leadership after 18 leaders were suspended from the party by the party's discipline committee. He stated that factionalism was rife in the committee's decision and the leaders were targeted in-lieu of the upcoming general convention. He further stated the need to hold elections for the party's sister organizations, stating it had been 9 years since elections were held and the continuous formation of ad hoc committee's was against the party statue.

=== Post 2025 Nepali Student Movement ===
Following the post-2025 Nepali youth movement, he voiced support for youth-led demands for transparency and reform, engaged with youth leaders, and reiterated the need for intra-party renewal within the Nepali Congress. He expressed solidarity with youth voices advocating for transparency and accountability. KC was a staunch advocate of the second special general convention of the Nepali Congress held on 10 January 2025. He was subsequently re-elected as a Senior Member of the party's Central Executive Committee.

He has consistently advocated for the timely convening of the 15th General Convention of the Nepali Congress, scheduled for 9 September 2026, emphasizing its importance for the party's renewal and organizational strengthening.

=== House of Representatives (2026–Present) ===
KC was re-elected to the seventh House of Representatives on 26 March 2026 from the party list of the Nepali Congress and was sworn in by President Ram Chandra Poudel in an oath taking ceremony held at the Rashtrapati Bhavan. He will swear in the Member of Parliaments elected during the 2026 Nepali general election as the senior most member of parliament.

== Social service initiatives ==
In memory of his parents, Yashoda Devi and Bhagwan Singh, KC and his family established the Yashoda Devi–Bhagwan Singh KC Memorial Trust, a non-profit organization, which focuses on healthcare and educational initiatives in his hometown district of Nuwakot.

Since its establishment in 2013, the trust has organized over two dozen free health camps across rural Nuwakot, including a programme in Belkotgadhi Municipality in Nuwakot in February 2021 that served over 700 citizens with general, orthopaedic, gynaecology, dental, ENT, and dermatology, as well as X-ray and ECG services.

During the COVID-19 pandemic, the trust supplied medical equipment to health facilities across Nuwakot, including nine oxygen concentrators, ICU beds, PPE, masks, and sanitizers for Trishuli Hospital, Kaule Health Post, and rural municipalities such as Kispang, Tarkeshwar and Myagang. The trust has also supported local schools by providing computers, hygiene kits, and warm clothing, including a donation of goods worth approximately Rs 850,000 to Chandra Devi Basic School and Sanukimtang Secondary School in Myagang Rural Municipality.

== Electoral history ==
=== Election in the 1990s ===
1991 legislative elections (Nuwakot 3)

Party	Candidate	Votes
Nepali Congress	Arjun Narasingha K.C.	11,086
CPN (Unified Marxist–Leninist)	Mahendra Pande	10,140
Result	Congress gain	

1994 legislative elections (Nuwakot 3)

Party	Candidate	Votes
Nepali Congress	Arjun Narasingha K.C.	15,951
Rastriya Prajatantra Party	Prakash Chandra Lohani	10,387
Result	Congress hold	
Source: Election Commission

1999 legislative elections (Nuwakot 3)

Party	Candidate	Votes
CPN (Unified Marxist–Leninist)	Mahendra Pande	13,177
Nepali Congress	Arjun Narasingha K.C.	12,808
Result	CPN (UML) gain	

=== Election in the 2000s ===
2008 Constituent Assembly election (Nuwakot 1)

Party	Candidate	Votes
CPN (Maoist)	Bimala Subedi	20,581
Nepali Congress	Arjun Narasingha K.C.	12,984
CPN (Unified Marxist–Leninist)	Rajendra Prakash Lohani	6,730
Rastriya Janashakti Party	Rajendra Prasad Shrestha	4,720
CPN (Marxist–Leninist)	Kedar Nath Bajgain	2,237
Others		1,648
Invalid votes		3,286
Result	Maoist gain	
Source: Election Commission

2013 Constituent Assembly election (Nuwakot 1)

Party	Candidate	Votes
Nepali Congress	Arjun Narasingha K.C.	17,346
UCPN (Maoist)	Bimala Subedi	9,145
Rastriya Prajatantra Party	Dr. Prakash Chandra Lohani	6,927
CPN (Unified Marxist–Leninist)	Keshav Raj Pandey	6,401
Others		1,235
Result	Congress gain	
Source: NepalNews

2017 legislative elections (Nuwakot 2)

Party	Candidate	Votes
CPN (Unified Marxist–Leninist)	Narayan Prasad Khatiwada	36,892
Nepali Congress	Arjun Narasingha K.C.	26,335
Others		1,830
Invalid votes		4,770
Result	CPN (UML) gain	
Source: Election Commission

2022 general election (Nuwakot 2)

Party	Candidate	Votes
Nepali Congress	Arjun Narasingha K.C.	28,107
Rastriya Swatantra Party	Suman Bikram Pandey	16,477
CPN (Unified Marxist–Leninist)	Narayan Prasad Khatiwada	15,561
Rastriya Prajatantra Party	Jhanak Pyakurel	1,571
Others		1,288
Result	Congress gain	
Source: Election Commission

== Personal life ==
KC has six brothers and three sisters. He has five children including four daughters and one son. His second oldest daughter, Anjana KC Thapa, married popular youth leader and former Health Minister Gagan Thapa, who is the current president of the Nepali Congress.

His younger brother, Jagadiswor Narsingh KC, served in both the first and second Constituent Assembly and was elected three times as the President of Nepali Congress Nuwakot. In addition, Kedar Narsingh KC, his brother, previously served as the President of the Nepal Medical Council and the Director of the Tuberculosis Center.

== See also ==
- Gagan Thapa
- Jagadiswor Narsingh KC
- Kedar Narsingh KC
- Nepali Congress
