= Puwa River =

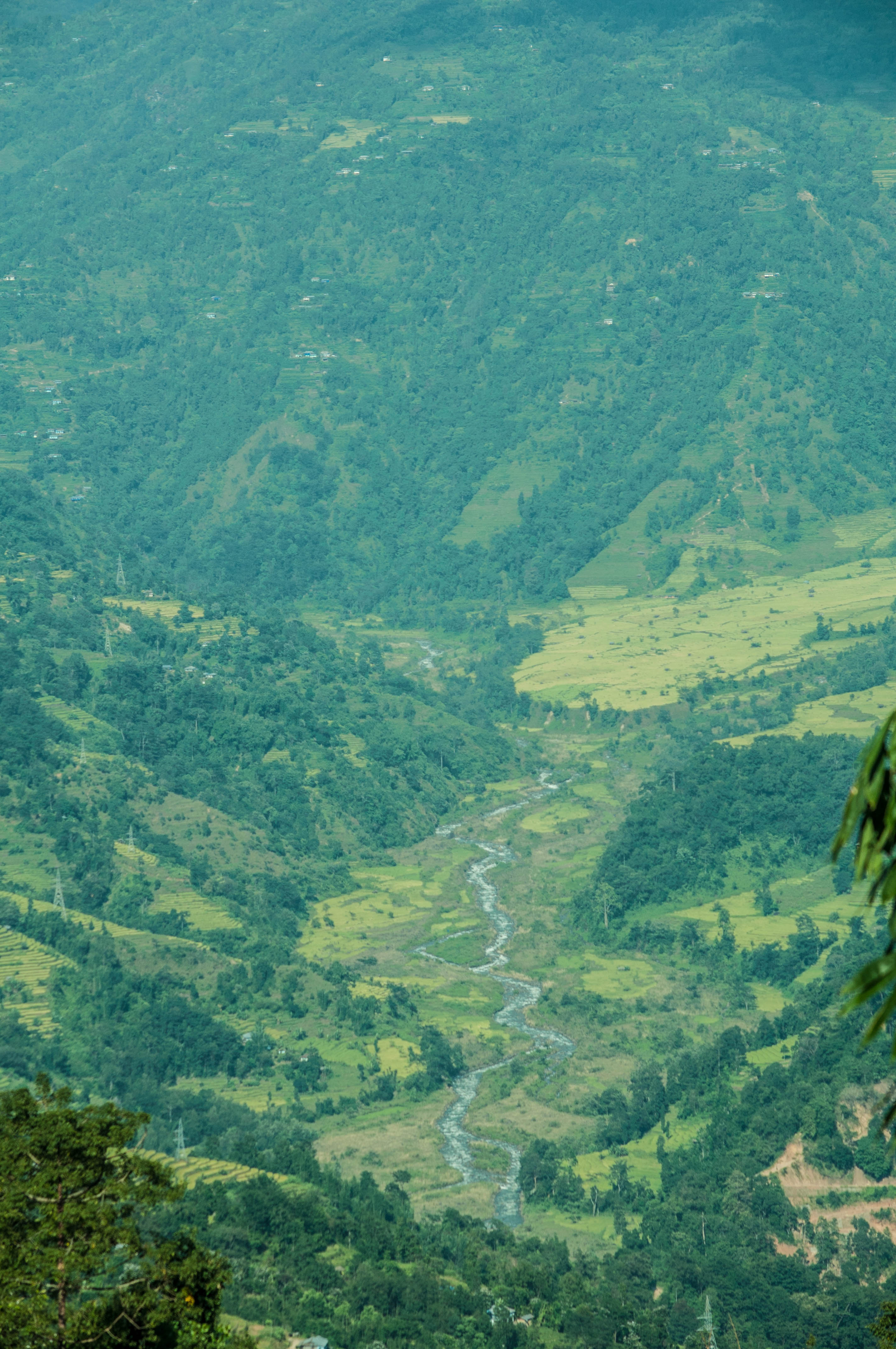
- Puwa Khola, Ilam District

- Location within Nepal
- Native name: Puwa Khola (Nepali)

Physical characteristics
- Mouth: Mai Khola
  - coordinates: 26.859383°N 87.912407°E

The Puwa River (or Puwa Khola) is a river in Nepal. It is a right tributary of the Mai Khola.

== Location ==
The Puwa Khola lies entirely within Ilam District. A 1994 environmental impact study of the Ilam hydroelectric project found 14 species of fish in the Puwa Khola.

== Farming ==
The Geya Danda Irrigation System uses water from the Puwa Khola to irrigate 125 hectares (310 acres) in Puwajung, Ilam Municipality-5, Ilam District, just above the river's confluence with the Mai Khola. The 6.2 MW Puwa Khola hydro electrical project is about 500 metres (1,600 ft) above the irrigation system. Access road construction has damaged some of the farmland, and about 250 liters per second (3,300 imp gal/min) of water is diverted to the power station. The diverted water flows along a 3.2 kilometres (2.0 mi) headrace tunnel and then a 990 metres (3,250 ft) penstock pipe to the power station, which discharges it into the left bank of the Mai Khola. This leaves very little irrigation water in the dry season.

== Hydroelectricity ==
There are four hydroelectric plants along the river.

Project	Power	Status	Commissioned
Puwa Khola-1 Small Hydropower Plant	4 MW	Live	2017-10-09
Puwa II Hydropower Project	4.96 MW	Construction	
Puwa Khola Hydropower Station	6.2 MW	Live	2004-04-04
Upper Puwa-1 Hydropower Project	3 MW	Live	2015-01-16

== Sources ==
- Hirakaji Ghale (September 2005), Independent Evaluation of Mai River Area Water Partnership (AWP) (PDF), Min Bhawan, Kathmandu: Consolidated Management Services Nepal (CMS)
- "Puwa Khola", Nepal Water Resource Portal, PEI: Policy Entrepreneurs Incorporated
- Rajbanshi, K. J. (2002), "Zoogeographical distribution and the status of cold water fish in Nepal", Cold Water Fisheries in the Trans-Himalayan Countries, Food and Agriculture Organization of the United Nations, ISBN 978-92-5-104807-8
- Sewanta Kattel (December 2006), "Dispute Management in Farmer's Managed Irrigation System: A Case Study of Geya Danda Irrigation System of Eastern Nepal", Dhaulagiri Journal of Sociology and Anthropology, 1, doi:10.3126/dsaj.v1i0.277
