= Narayan Prasad Khatiwada =

Nepali politician

- नारायण प्रसाद खतिवडा

Member of Parliament, Pratinidhi Sabha
- In office 4 March 2018 – 18 September 2022
- Preceded by: Ram Sharan Mahat
- Constituency: Nuwakot 2

Personal details
- Born: 10 June 1957 (age 68)
- Party: CPN UML

Narayan Prasad Khatiwada is a Nepali communist politician and a member of the House of Representatives of the federal parliament of Nepal. He was elected from Nuwakot-2 constituency, representing CPN UML of the left alliance, by defeating his nearest rival, senior Nepali Congress leader Arjun Narsingh KC, by more than 10,000 votes.

He had previously contested the second constituent assembly election in 2013 from Nuwakot-3 constituency.
