= Butwal Solar PV Project =

Solar power station in Nepal

Butwal Solar PV Station
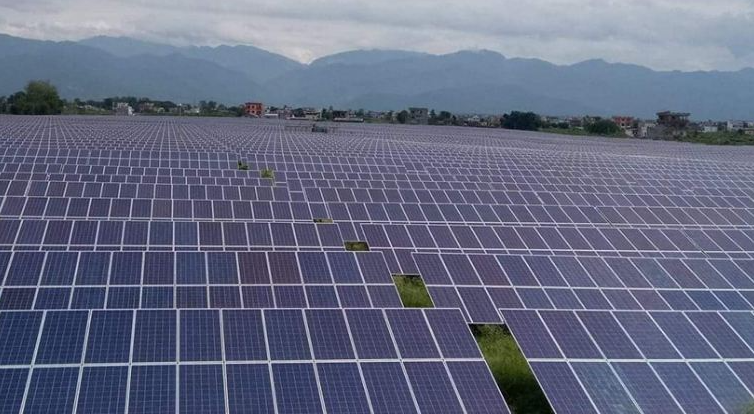
- Butwal Solar PV Project
- Country: Nepal
- Location: Butwal, Rupandehi District
- Coordinates: 27°37′42″N 83°02′05″E
- Status: Commissioned
- Construction began: 2019
- Commission date: 2020
- Owner: Talking Orange Productions Pvt Ltd.
- Operator: Ridi Hydropower Development Company Ltd.

Solar farm
- Type: Standard PV

External links
- Website: http://ridihydro.com.np/home/pagesDisp/butwal-solar-pv-project

Butwal Solar PV Project is located at Rupandehi District of Lumbini Province, Nepal. The plant is owned and run by Ridi Hydropower Development Company Ltd, an IPP. The plant came in operation in October 2020.

The power station has capacity of 8.5 MW consisting of 32,640 number of solar panels - each generating about 330 watts peak power. The plant occupies an area of about 26 Bighas of land (approx. 17.2 hector). The energy generated by the project is connected to the 33 kV Butwal Substation in Tilottama. The solar station generates energy only during the daytime.

The plant was built in 10 months at the cost of NPR 65.5 crores. The loan is financed by Bank of Kathmandu along with Citizens Bank and Nepal Bangladesh Bank. The electricity is sold to Nepal Electricity Authority at rate of NPR 7.3/unit for 25 years. After 25 years, the ownership will be transferred to the Nepal government.

== Power Generation ==
Fiscal Year Months (As per Nepali Calendar)	2077/78	2078/79	79/80
Shrawan	-	1,044,060	1,210,340
Bhadra	-	937,100	1,169,780
Aswin	-	1,081,190	1,055,800
Kartik	568,510 (15 days)	1,082,440	1,193,230
mangsir	887,520	964,940	1,067,960
Paush	741,310	848,940	937,030
Magh	754,120	674,210	897,030
Falgun	1,032,770	1,336,600	1,275,090
Chaitra	1,210,070	1,260,660	1,413,720
Baishakh	1,225,630	1,248,750	1,327,540
Jestha	1,178,480	1,256,260	1,456,010
Asar	925,500	1,200,250	1,145,100
Total	8,526,910	9,873,050	14,148,630

== See also ==
- List of power stations in Nepal
- Nuwakot Solar Power Station
- Mithila 2 Solar PV Station
- Solar power in Nepal
