= Kedar Narsingh KC =

Nepali politician and physician

- केदार नरसिंह केसी

Director of the National Tuberculosis Control Center, Nepal
- In office 3 July 2017 – 20 December 2018
- President: Bidhya Devi Bhandari
- Prime Minister: Pushpa Kamal Dahal

President of the Nepal Medical Association
- In office 21 December 2009 – 20 December 2012
- Preceded by: Chop Lal Bhusal
- Succeeded by: Kiran Prasad Shrestha

Personal details
- Born: 4 April 1961 (age 65) Nuwakot, Nepal
- Party: Nepali Congress
- Spouse: Rekha Thapa
- Education: Institute of Medicine, Nepal; University of Rajshahi; University of Dhaka

Kedar Narsingh KC (Nepali: केदार नरसिंह केसी) (born 4 April 1961) is a Nepali physician, politician and social worker, previously serving as the director of the National Tuberculosis Center and the president of the Nepali Medical Association.

KC previously served as the president of the Society for Democratic Thought, a think tank, as well as the president of B.P. Smriti Hospital, both based in Kathmandu.

In addition, he heads a nonprofit foundation, Yasodadevi Bhagawan Singh KC Memorial Trust, named after his parents. The foundation provides free medical equipment and essential medicines to underserved areas of Nepal and conducts free health clinics, awareness drives and sanitary campaigns.

== Medical career ==
KC is a former president of Nepal Medical Association.

He served as the Medical Superintendent at the Sundhara-based Central Jail, where he oversaw the care of French serial killer Charles Sobhraj, before being appointed as the director of the National Tuberculosis Control Center in Thimi in 2016.

On November 13, 2019, KC stated that Nepal was set to miss the target of ending Tuberculosis by 2035.

Throughout his career, KC has hosted numerous health camps, where he provides free clinical services and distributes essential medicine to patients throughout Nepal.

== Political career ==
On November 18, 2018, KC along with other human rights activists issued an appeal to the parliament, National Human Rights Commission (NHRC) and UN Security Council stating that the perpetrators of human rights violation who succeeded in capturing the state power had been stalling the transitional justice process.

On 21 January 2022, following Minister for Infrastructure and Transport Renu Yadav's public threat of targeted killings of opponents, KC along with a group of activists issued a statement demanding that Prime Minister Sher Bahadur Deuba immediately sack Yadav from his cabinet and start legal proceedings against her.
