= Nuwakot Solar Power Station =

Solar power station in Nepal

- Country: Nepal
- Location: Bidur Urban Municipality, Nuwakot
- Coordinates: 27.890695°N 85.133989°E
- Construction began: 2018
- Commission date: 2020 (partially)
- Operator: Nepal Electricity Authority

Solar farm
- Type: Standard PV

External links
- Website: www.nea.org.np

Nuwakot Solar Power Station is located at Nuwakot District of Nepal. It is the largest solar power plant of Nepal. The plant is owned by Nepal Electricity Authority (NEA). The solar panels are installed in six locations within the premises of Devighat Hydropower Station which is also owned by the NEA. Energy generated by the project is connected to the 66 kV sub-station of Devighat Hydropower Station. The solar station generates energy only during the daytime.

The Chinese contractor Risen Energy Co. is involved in the operation and maintenance of the plant for the first five years. After that, the plant will be handed over to the NEA.

Construction of the station began in 2018. Its targeted construction duration was one year, however there were delays due to environment studies. NEA had planned to install 15MW by April 2020 which was again delayed due to nationwide lockdown to prevent the spread of COVID-19 pandemic. As of June 2020, only 1.25 MW has been installed.

The project cost is approximately NPR 4 billion which is funded by the government through NEA and concessional loan from the World Bank. The loan is a part of an agreement with the World Bank made in February 2015 to provide $130 million to the government of Nepal to build solar stations to supply electricity to the Kathmandu Valley. Out of the total amount, $37 million was allocated for this solar station.

== Projects ==
S.N.	Power Station	Location	Capacity (MW)	Commissioned	ref
1	Block No 1 Solar Farms Project	Charghare (Nuwakot)	5.100	2079-10-01	
2	Block No 2 Solar Farms Project	Charghare (Nuwakot)	8.300	2079-10-01	
3	Grid Tied Solar Farm Project	Bidur N.P. (Nuwakot)	3.090	2079-10-01	
4	Grid Connected Solar Project Block 4, Nuwakot	Charghare (Nuwakot)	1.370	2079-10-01	
5	Grid Tied Solar Farm Project Block n.5	Bidur N.P. (Nuwakot)	6.500	2079-10-01	
	Total		24.36		

== Controversy ==
Although work on the solar plant should have begun within a year of signing the loan agreement with the World Bank, the NEA took around two years to award the contract as the entire contractor selection process due to controversy.

Mukesh Raj Kafle, the director of NEA, unilaterally decided to hire a Chinese company to build the project. Kulman Ghising, the following director, decided to award the project to another Chinese contractor, Risen Energy Co., but the parliamentary committee invalidated the decision after receiving a complaint that the price of NPR 3.7 billion quoted by Raijin was NPR 680 million higher than the cost proposed by the contractor favoured by Kafle. The contractor was suspended by the parliamentary Public Accounts Committee (PAC). Later however, the Patan High Court reinstated the Chinese contractor.

== See also ==
- List of power stations in Nepal
- Butwal Solar PV Project
- Nepal Electricity Authority
- Devighat Hydropower Station
- Solar power in Nepal
