= Bidur =

Bidur बिदुर नगरपालिका
- Municipality
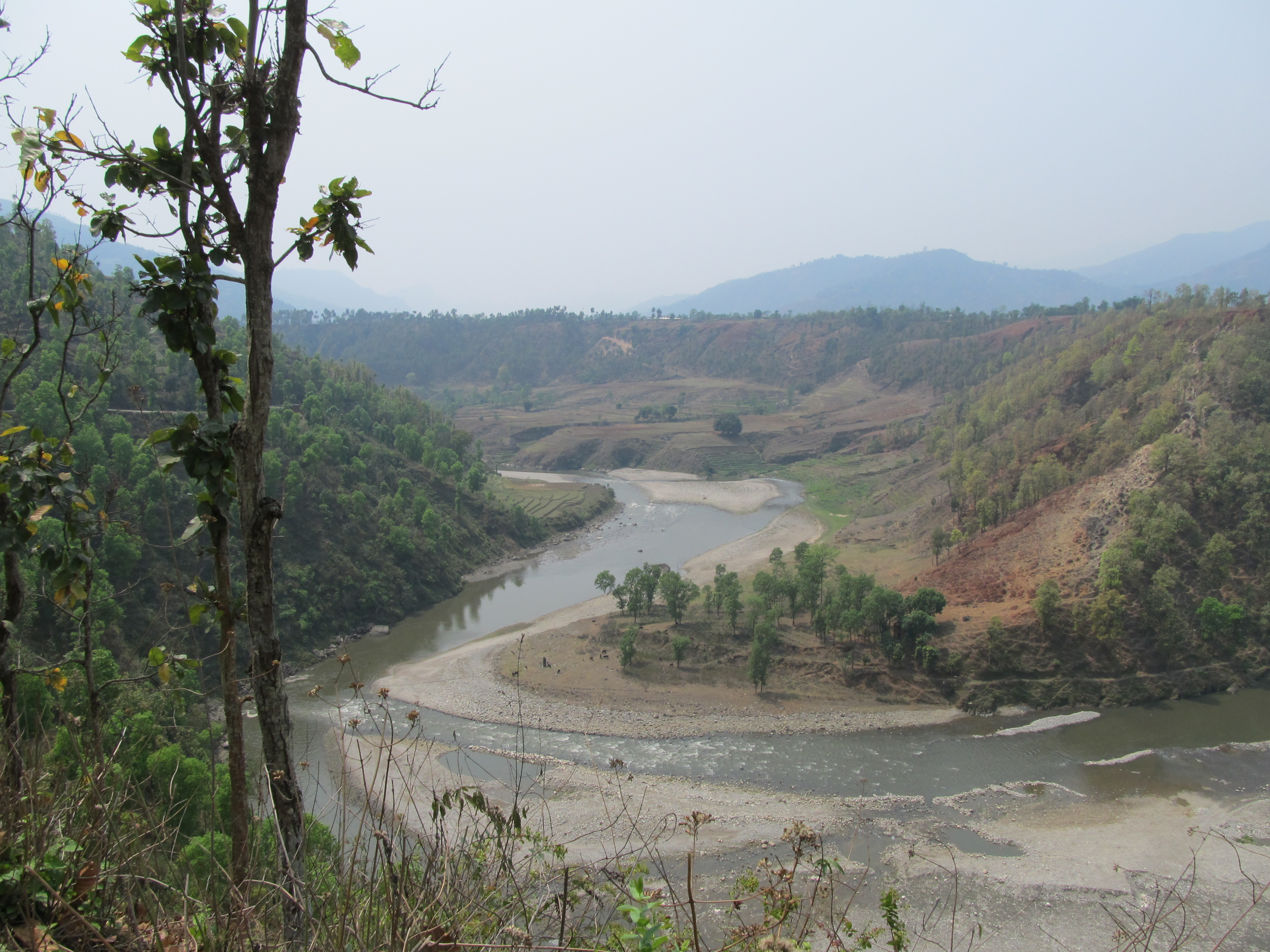

- Location in Nepal
- Coordinates: 27°53′24″N 85°9′35″E
- Country: Nepal
- Province: Bagmati
- District: Nuwakot

Government
  - Mayor: Rajan Shrestha
  - Deputy Mayor: Prabha Bogati

Population (2011)
  - Total: 26,750
  - Religions: Hindu
- Time zone: UTC+5:45 (NST)
- Postal code: 44900, 44908
- Area code: 010
- Website: www.bidurmun.gov.np

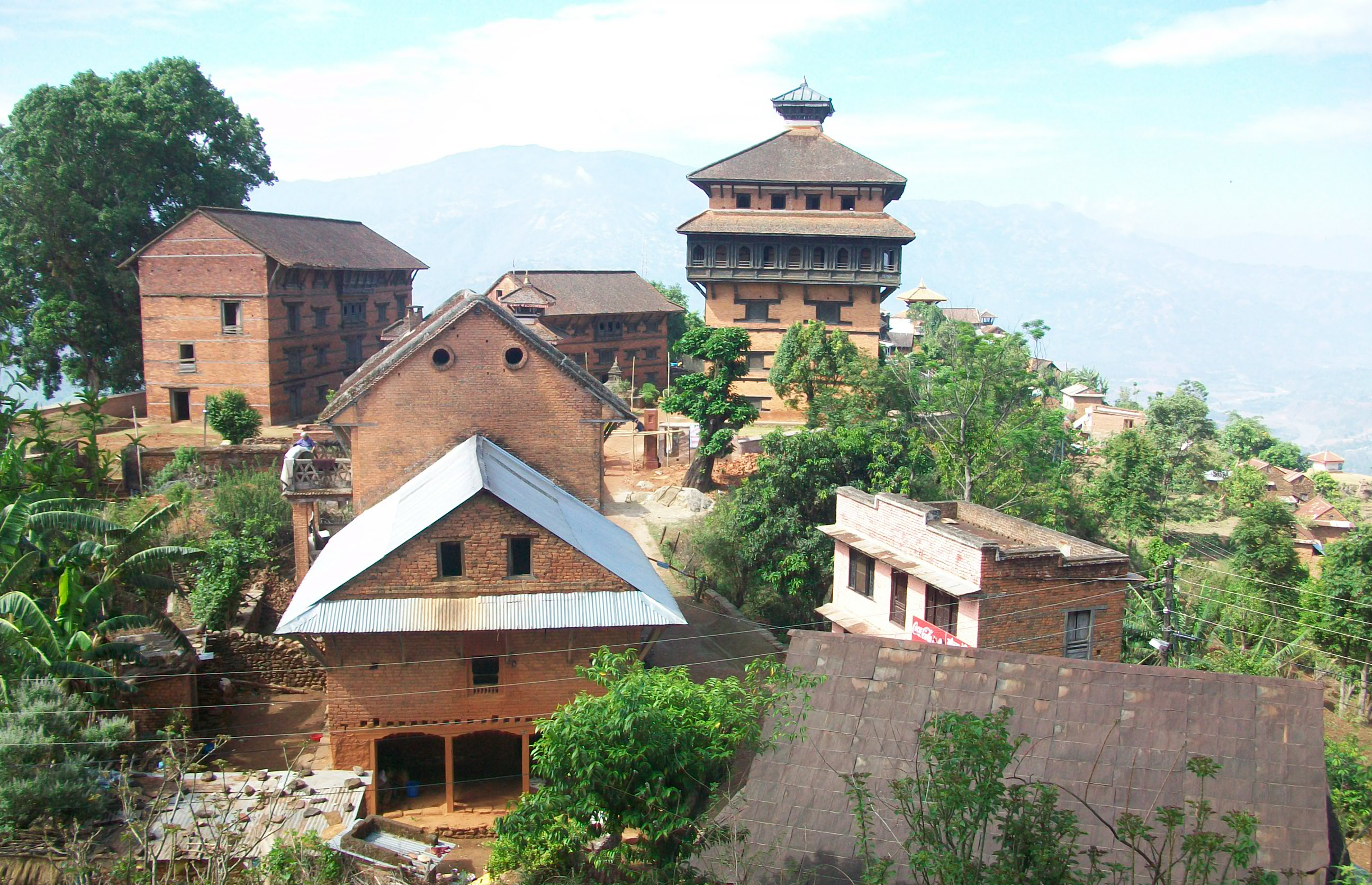
Ancient Nuwakot bazar with 7-storeyed palace standing Which was formerly 9 storeyed.

Bidur is the capital of Nuwakot District in Bagmati Province, Nepal. At the time of the 1991 Nepal census it had a population of 18,694 and contained 3,736 houses.

== History ==
In February 2008, terrorists damaged the town's water supply plant.

During the earthquake on 25 April 2015, a 37-year-old resident of Bidur named Shiva Shrestha was buried in a landslide and was rescued alive 98 hours afterwards. He was on his way to a picnic with fourteen of his friends, eleven of whom were buried during the massive landslide. Shrestha sustained several injuries on the head and body, and said he survived by drinking muddy water. After the earthquake, Bidur is still in the phase of rebuilding.

The municipality was severely impacted by the 2026 Nepal floods, with wards 1, 4, 5, 9, and 10 hardest hit. 311 people were reported missing. 538 homes and three educational institutions were destroyed. Bidur served as the primary staging ground for search and rescue operations led by the Nepali Army.

== Economy ==
In 2020 the first part of the biggest solar power station in Nepal (Nuwakot Solar Power Station) was connected to the electric grid. The solar plant is located next to Devighat Hydropower Station.

== Government and public services ==
Bidur Ward No. 6 has a dumping site. Another dumping site has been proposed in Ward No. 2.

== Media ==
To promote local culture Bidur has three community radio stations. They are Radio Trishuli – 88.4 MHz 010560789, Image weekly 010561678, TV Trishuli 010560181, 9851093290 Trishuli Prawaha weekly 9851002938, Khabarpage.com 9851093290, Radio Jalapa 9851080122
