= Nepal Electricity Authority =

Electric power generation and distribution authority of Nepal

- नेपाल विद्युत प्राधिकरण
- Abbreviation: NEA
- Formation: 16 August 1985; 41 years ago
- Type: Governmental Corporation
- Purpose: Electricity Generation, Distribution
- Headquarters: Kathmandu
- Managing Director: Dirghayu Kumar Shrestha
- Main organ: Board of Directors
- Parent organization: Ministry of Energy, Government of Nepal
- Website: http://nea.org.np/
- Formerly called: Nepal Electricity Corporation

Nepal Electricity Authority, Kathmandu

Nepal Electricity Authority (NEA; Nepali: नेपाल विद्युत प्राधिकरण), founded on 16 August 1985, is the parent generator, transmittor and retail distributor of electric power under the supervision of the Government of Nepal.

NEA has its own power plants. In addition it also buys power from Independent Power Producers (IPP). Most of the power is generated from hydro electricity. It operates two fuel operated plants generating 53 Megawatts. Nepal’s total installed electricity generation capacity has reached 4,296 MW. This milestone, confirmed by the Ministry of Energy, Water Resources and Irrigation, includes output from both the Nepal Electricity Authority and private sector producers.

== Power production ==
=== Plants owned by NEA ===
NEA owns and operates following power plants. It has a dedicated department for operation and maintenance for those plants.

Total Sales of Electricity	Total Available	Year
4,764.678 GWh	6,257.73 GWh	2017
5,560.24 GWh		2018

Hydropower Station	Capacity (MW)	Project Owner
Kali Gandaki A, Syangja	144	Nepal Electricity Authority
Middle Marshyangdi Hydropower Station, Lamjung	70	Nepal Electricity Authority
Marshyangdi Hydropower Station, Tanahun	69	Nepal Electricity Authority
Kulekhani I Hydropower Plant, Makawanpur	60	Nepal Electricity Authority
Kulekhani II Hydropower Plant, Makawanpur	32	Nepal Electricity Authority
Chameliya Hydropower Plant, Darchula	30	Nepal Electricity Authority
Trishuli Hydropower Station, Nuwakot	24	Nepal Electricity Authority
Gandak Hydropower Plant, Nawalparasi	15	Nepal Electricity Authority
ModiKhola Hydropower Station, Parbat	14.8	Nepal Electricity Authority
Devighat Hydropower Plant, Nuwakot	14.1	Nepal Electricity Authority
Sunkoshi Hydropower Station, Sindhupalchok	10.05	Nepal Electricity Authority
PuwaKhola Hydropower Station, Ilam	6.2	Nepal Electricity Authority
Chatara Hydropower Station, Sunsari	3.2	Nepal Electricity Authority
Panauti Hydropower Station, Kavre	2.4	Nepal Electricity Authority
Seti Hydropower Station, Pokhara	1.5	Nepal Electricity Authority
Fewa Hydropower Station, Pokhara	1	Nepal Electricity Authority
Sundarijal Hydropower Plant, Sundarijal	0.97	Nepal Electricity Authority
Upper Trishuli 3 'A'	60	Nepal Electricity Authority

=== Independent power producers ===
NEA being a de facto purchaser of any electricity generated inside Nepal, it buys electricity from all the IPPs of Nepal.

==== Solar Power Stations ====
S.N.	Company	Project Name	Location	Capacity (MW)
1	Nepal Electricity Authority	Nuwakot Solar Power Station	Bidur, Nuwakot	25
2	Nepal Electricity Authority	Singhadurbar Solar Project	Singhadurbar, Kathmandu	1.3

==== Diesel power stations ====
Name	Capacity (MW)	Commissioned	Location	Owner	Refs
Duhabi Multifuel	39	1997	sunsari		
Hetauda	14.41	2012	Makwanpur		

== Transmission and distribution lines ==
All transmission and distributions lines in Nepal is owned and operated by NEA. As of 2024, Nepal's total transmission line length is 6,507 kilometers. This includes 4,136 km of 132 kV, 1,213 km of 220 kV, 644 km of 400 kV, and 514 km of 66 kV. NEA is constructing 236 transmission line projects with capacities of 132 kV, 220 kV, and 400 kV.

== International power trade ==
=== Power trade with India ===
NEA is involved in cross border power trading with the neighbouring countries. It buys electricity from Indian producers when there is power deficit in Nepal. It sells when there is power surplus.

=== Power trade with Bangladesh ===
In 2024 NEA started selling electricity to Bangladesh via Indian transmission line. At the first stage 40 MW electricity was dispatched. The dispatch was based on triparty agreement between Vidyut Vyapar Nigam of India, Bangladesh Power Development Board and NEA.

== See also ==
- Department of Electricity Development
- Independent Power Producers Association, Nepal (IPPAN)
