= Sankhu =

Ancient town in Nepal

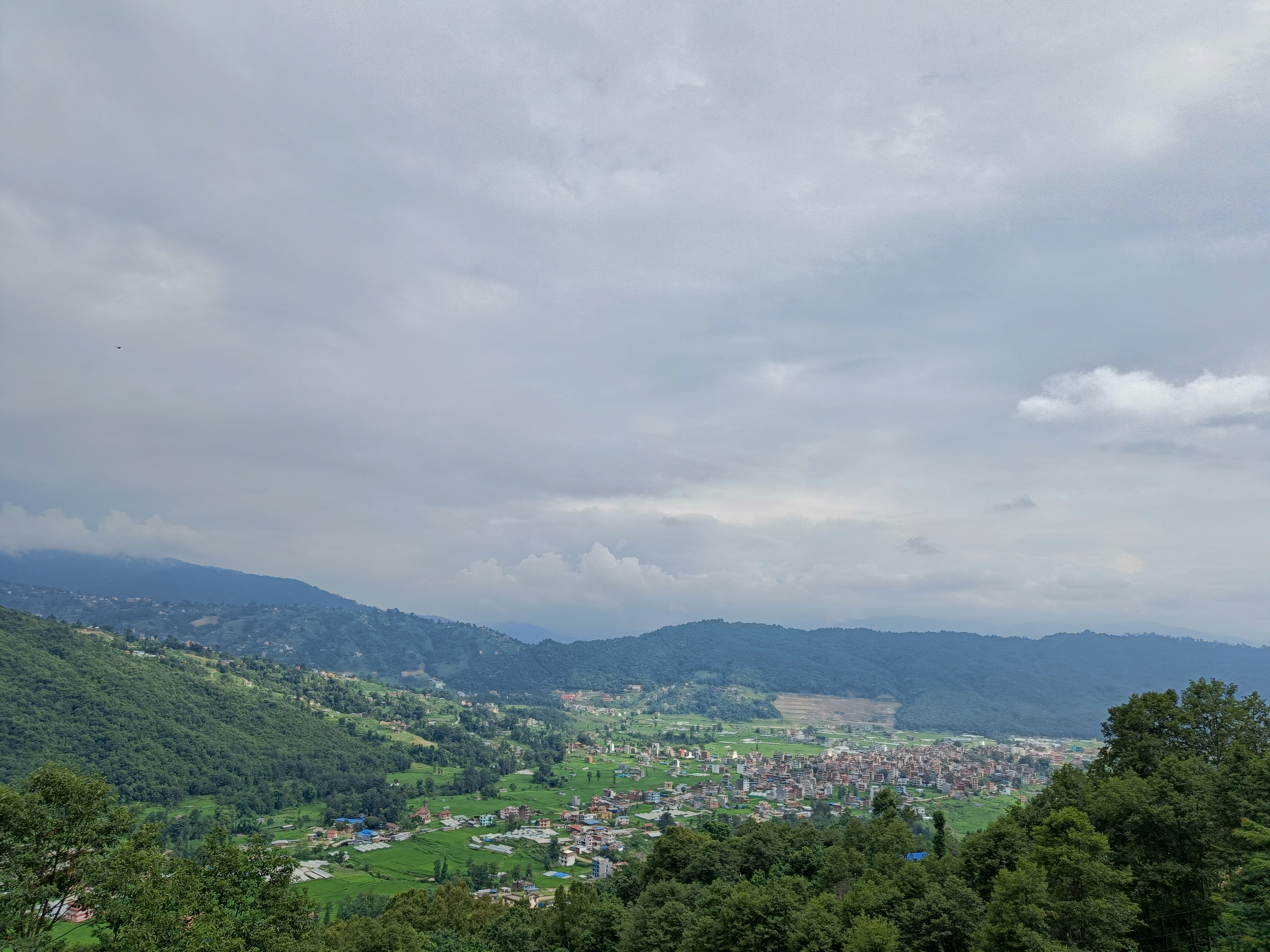
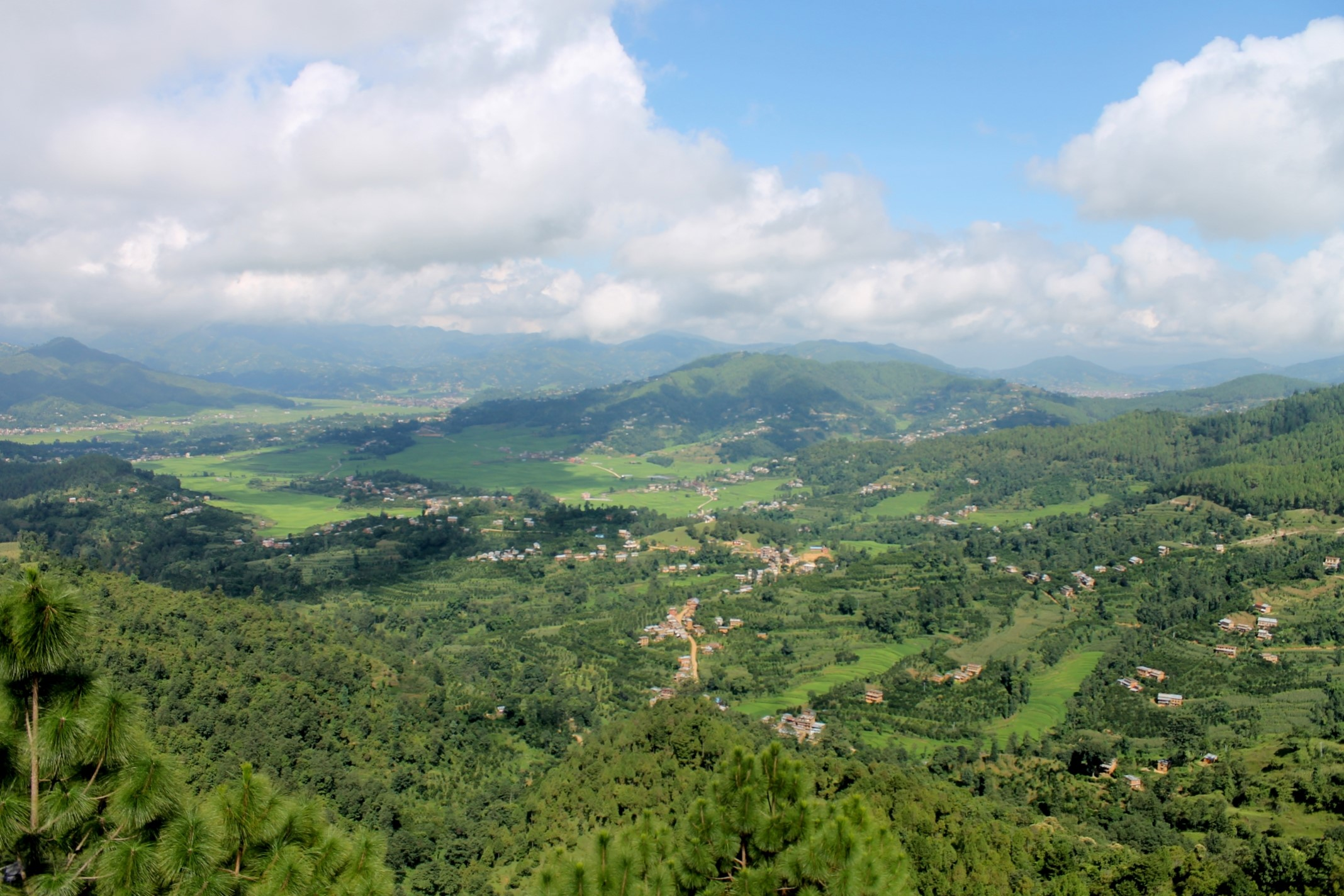
Sankhu साँखु Sankhu seen from Bajrayogini Sankhu valley seen from Nagarkot Sakwo(सक्व/𑐳𑐎𑐸𑐰)

- Location in Nepal
- Coordinates: 27°43′0″N 85°27′0″E
- Country: Nepal
- Zone: Bagmati Zone
- District: Kathmandu District

Population (2011)
  - Total: 3,788
  - Ethnicities: Newars
- Time zone: UTC+5:45 (Nepal Time)
- Postal code: 44601

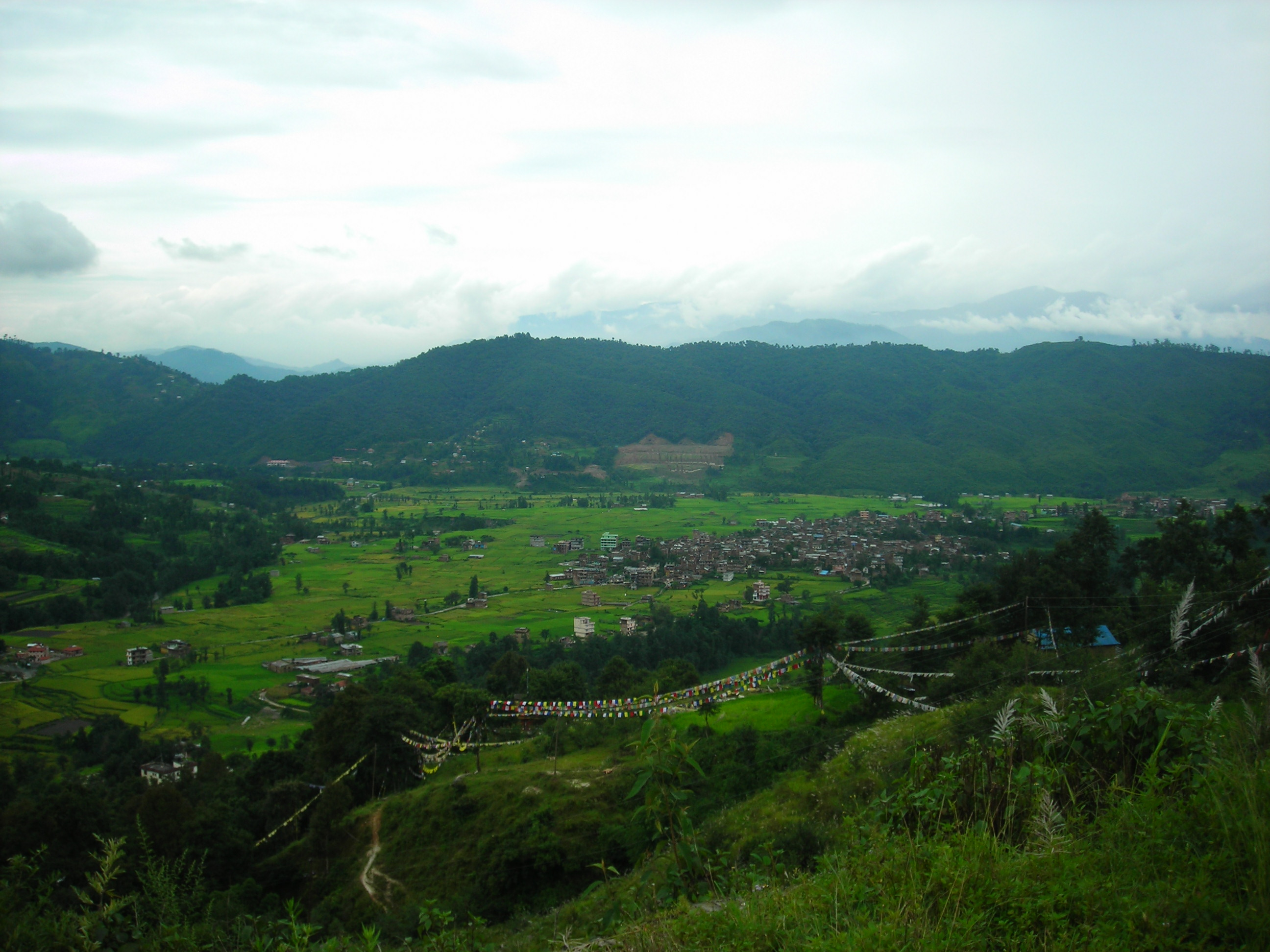
Sankhu an ancient town near Kathmandu, Nepal

Sankhu (Nepal Bhasa: साँखु, alternative name: Sakwa (Nepal Bhasa: 𑐳𑐎𑑂𑐰/सक्व)) is the ancient Newari town located in the north-eastern corner of Kathmandu Valley, about 17 km from the city center of Kathmandu. Mani-Yogini, one of the four Vajra Yoginis of Kathmandu Valley, resides here, and it is located along the historic trade route between Kathmandu and Lhasa. It is believed that the name Sakwa has two parts - Samdesh (Meaning Tibet) and Kvay (Meaning Below), together meaning a town below Tibet.

Sankhu was formerly divided into three Village Development Committee, namely, Pukhulachhi, Suntol and Bajrayogini. Recently the town of Sankhu has been declared as Shankharapur Municipality merging three above-mentioned VDCs and other neighbouring VDCs. At the time of the 2011 Nepal census it had a population of 4333 living in 928 individual households. Sankhu lies between river Salinakhu (also Salinadi) in east and Asakhu in the west.

== History ==
According to the text of Manisaila Mahavadana, the Sankhu valley was a lake. Goddess Vajrayogini cleaved the mountain to drain the water, similar to the activity done by Manjushri for Kathmandu Valley. Vajrayogini then instructed the priest Jogdev and the first king Sankhadev to build the town of Sankhu, in the shape of a conch shell.

Swayambhu Purana also mentions a town named Saketu, but there is weak evidence that Sankhu is same town.

Sankhu is also mentioned in the story of Swasthani, where it is named as Lavanya desa, where a Brahmin boy is subsequently made the king by marrying the princess Chandravati. The story mentions Salinadi.

Based on this story, an annual festival is celebrated in Sankhu.

The oldest inscription found in Sankhu is dated 538 AD which is dated to the Licchavi Period. The inscription was written by the king Vamanadeva. The city was built on a trade route from Kathmandu to Kuti, Shigatse and Lhasa in Tibet.

Before Malla Dynasty in Nepal, Sankhu is believed to be a separate kingdom because of the presence of the historical Durbar square (Layaku), but this is still debated. It is mentioned that king Sankaradeva's grandson Manadeva went to a bihar in Sankhu after killing his father. This indicates that Sankhu existed during the time of Sankardeva.

During medieval period, Sankhu was a princely state of Bhaktapur. Sakhu is mentioned in Gopalaraja Vamsavali as the place where in 1242AD war was fought and Echimis were defeated. There is mention about Sankhu in 1334AD as the place where a person named Snkhu Mulmi stole ornaments of Brahmins. During this period it is believed that Sankhu was one of the strong fortress of Nepal.

King Svarna Malla (1504–19) divided Sankhu into two parts and gave one half to his brother. During 1520–30, King Surya Malla captured Sankhu and stayed there for a few years as a ruler. During 1540s Jayavir Malla Deva ruled Sankhu. In 1560s, it was ruled by Trailokya Malla Deva and Queen Gangadevi.

King Jayaprakahs Malla ruled sankhu from 1736 to 1768. At the end of his rule, Mallas were overthrown from Kathmnadu by Gorkha Kingdom by Prithvi Narayan Shah in 1768. Prithvi Narayan Shah's initial plan was to capture Sanku before attacking Kathmandu because it was a trade route to Tibet. In 1746, he attacked Sankhu with the help from Ranajit Malla, the king of Bhaktapur. But the plan failed. It is believed that the people of Saknku were loyal to Mallas. A note from Colonel Kirkapatrick from 1793 mentions about the town of Sakhu as a place of great magnitude in the past but does not at present above a thousands families.

The Gorkhali kings turned Sankhu into Jagir to reward its functionaries by the Queen with an annual word of NPR 4000.

In Rana period, a Darbare was appointed who acted as the town chief and looked after local administration. The system was abolished in 1951 with transition to democratic system.

In Panchyat period, Sankhu had three village Panchayat as the local units. In 1990, the local units were renamed as village development committees. In 2011, the Nepal government changed it into Nagarpalika.

== Temples and Architecture ==
=== The Eight Gates ===
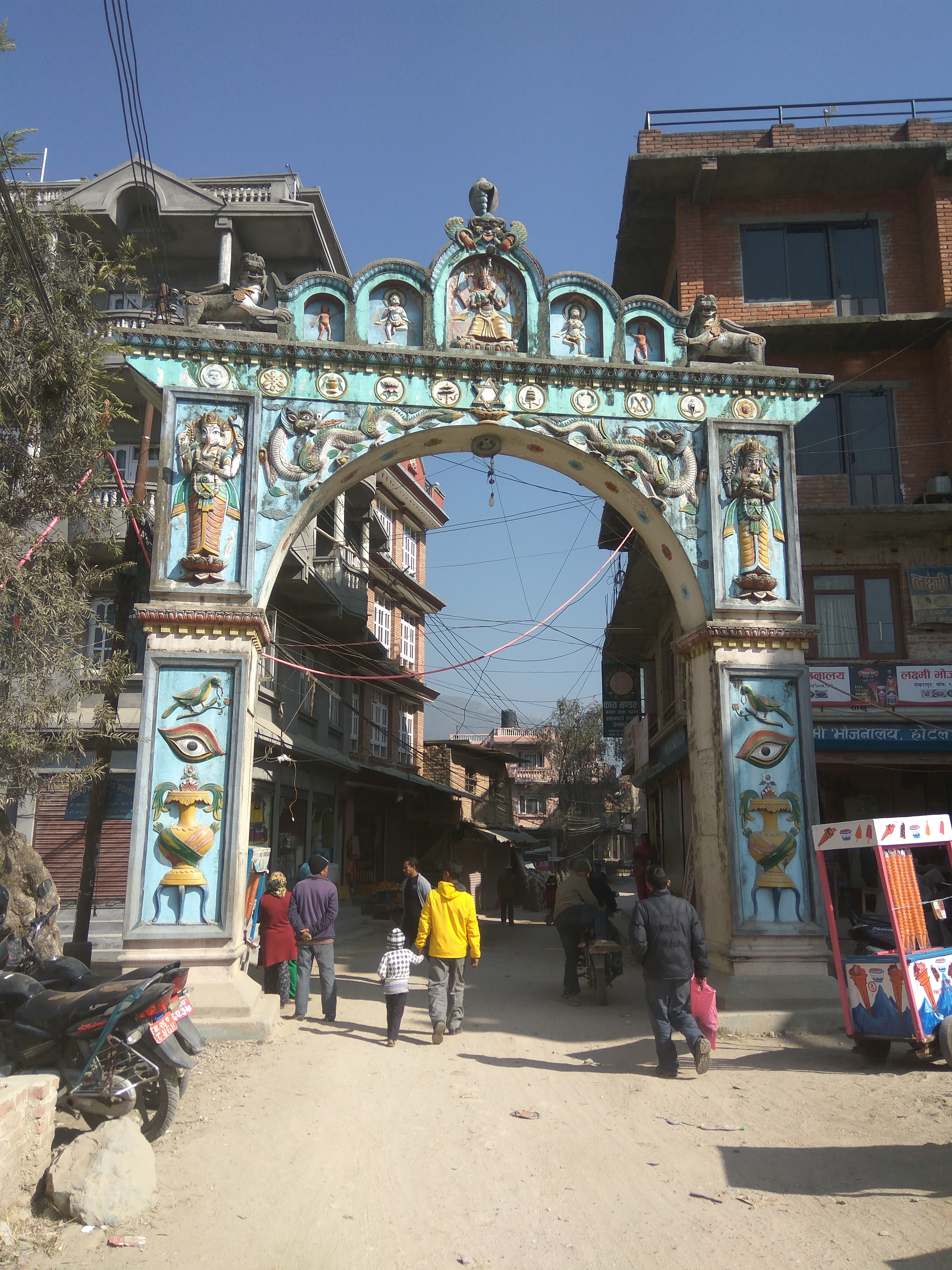
Bhau Dhwakha

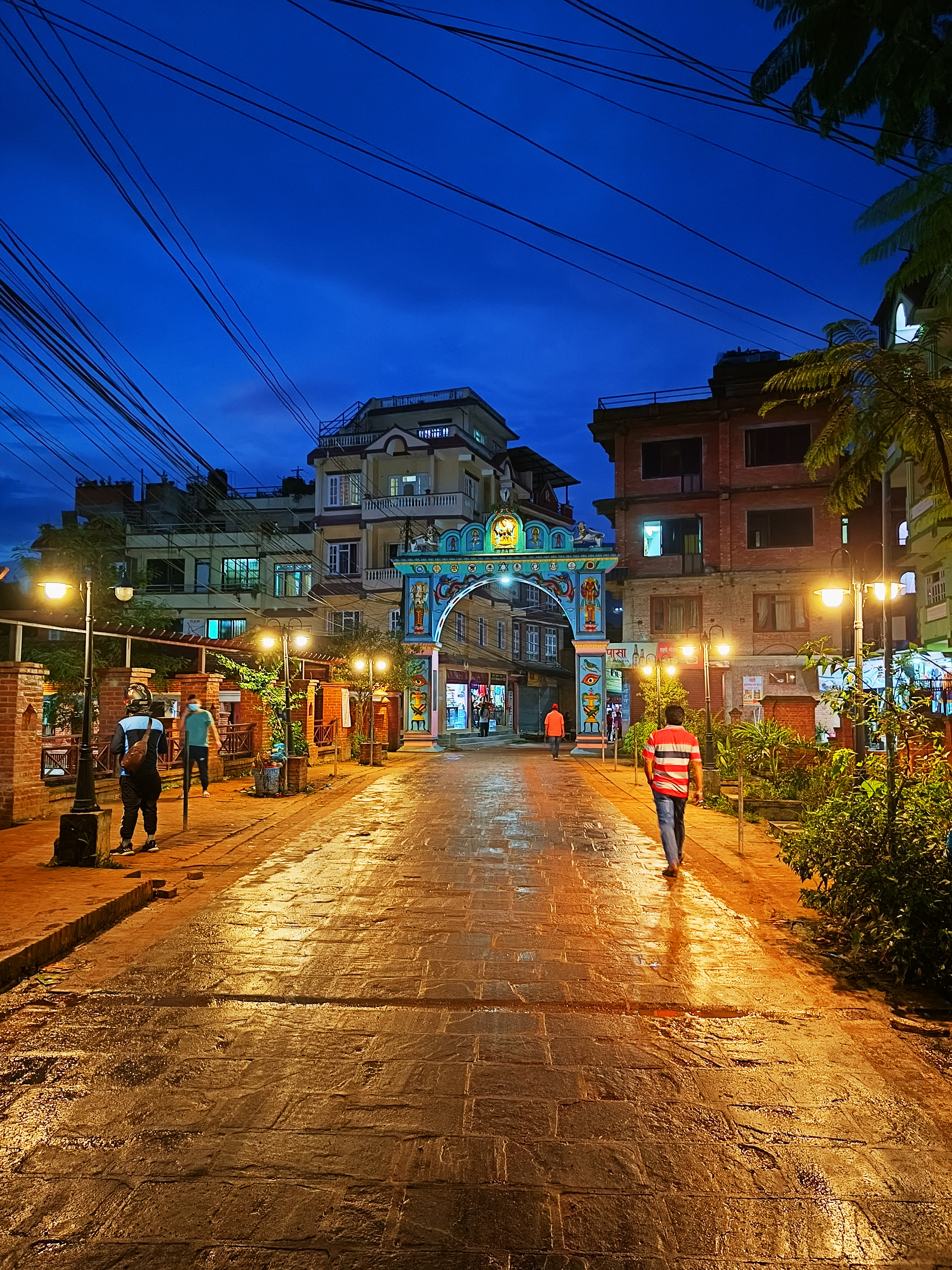
Bhau Dhwakha at evening in 2022

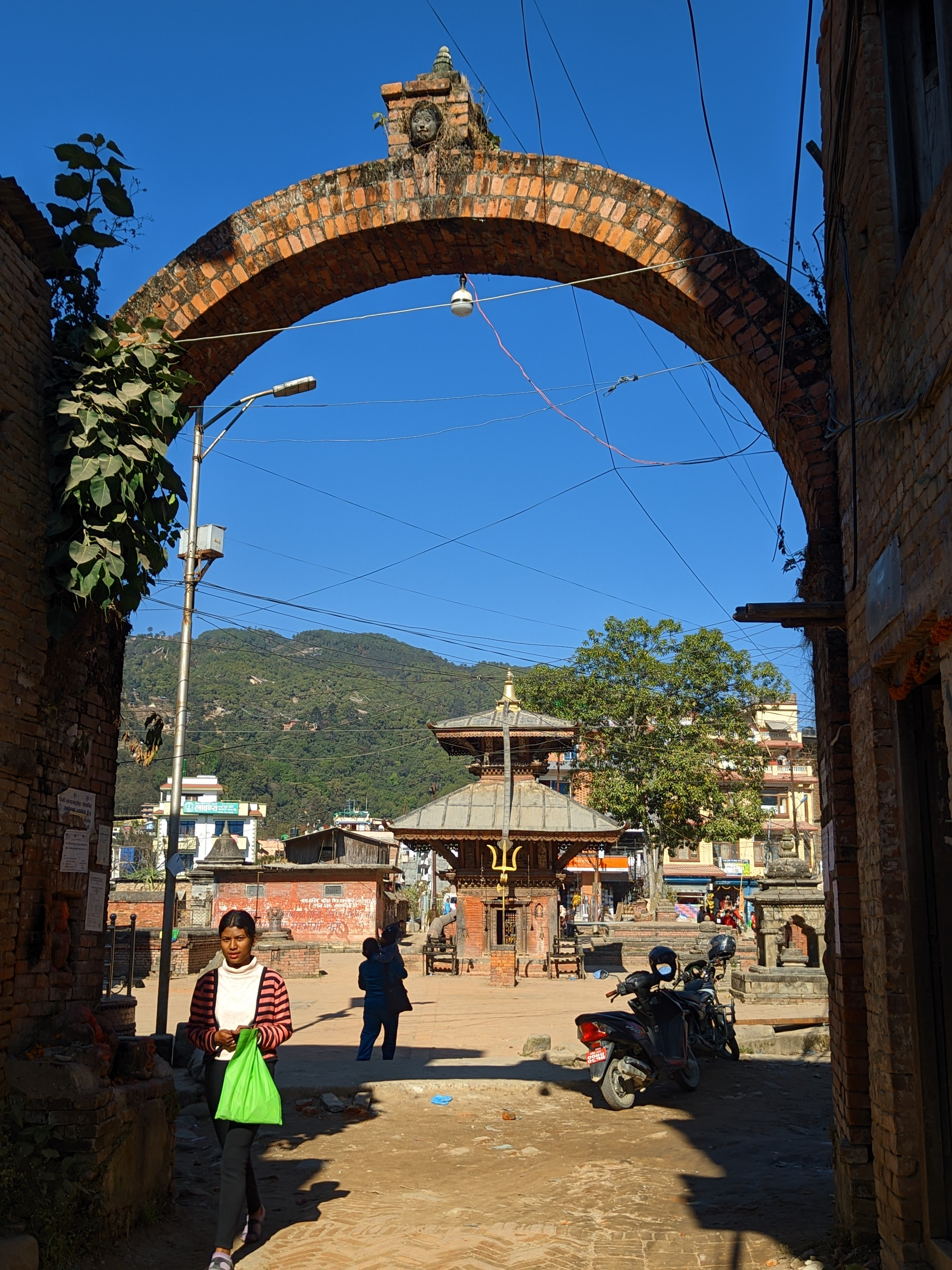
Si Dhwakha in 2022

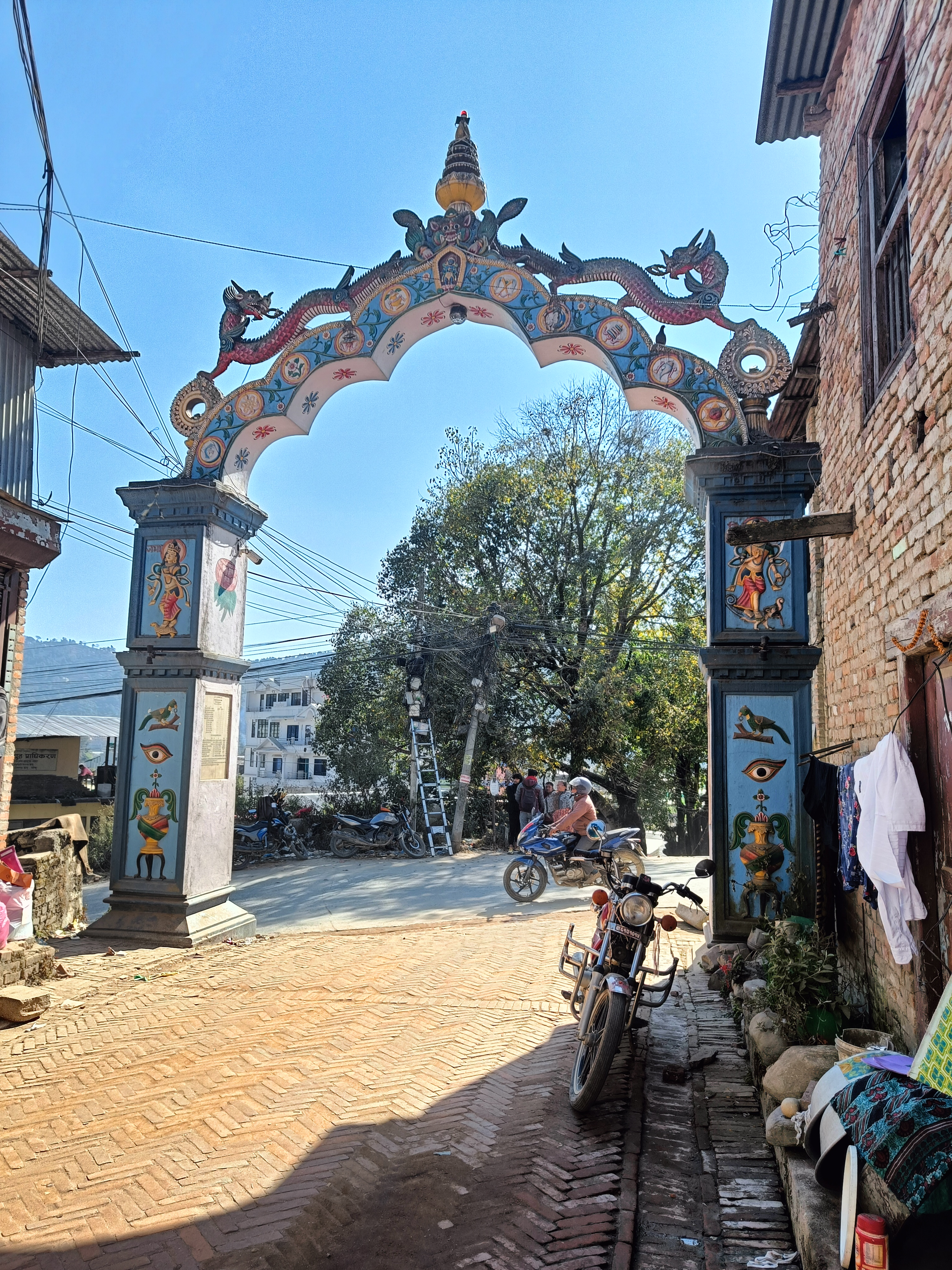
Mhyamachaa Dhwakha in 2022

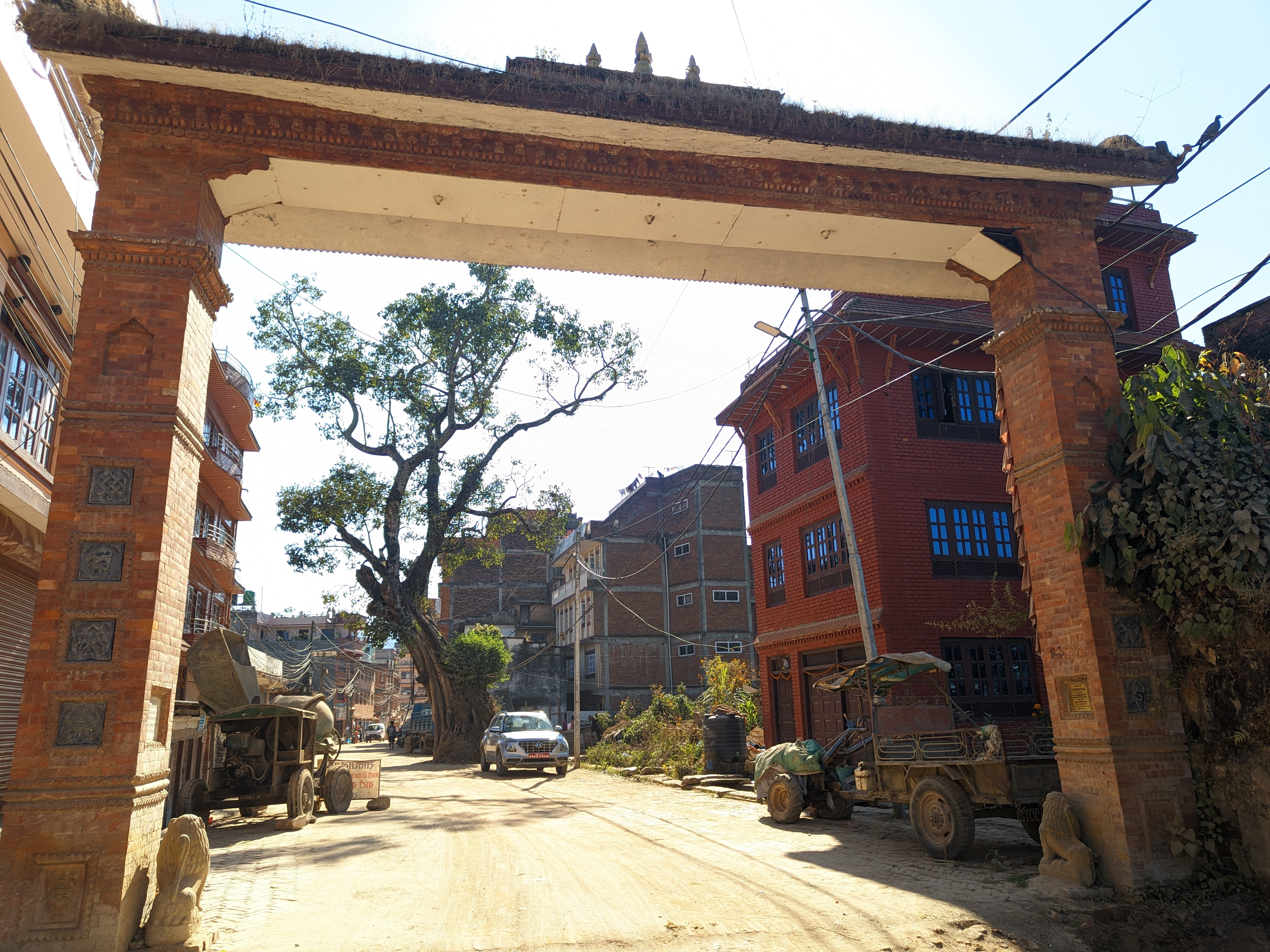
Dya Dhwakha in 2022(rebuilt recently)

The town used to have eight gates, at each entrances of the town. These gates became dilapidated and disappeared, but few were reconstructed namely the Bhau Dhwaha, Mhyamachaa Dhwakha, Dhunlla Dhwakha, Mahadyo Dhwakha and Naari Dhwakha. These gates used to have a paati (resthouse), Dhunge dhara (Water Spout; Nepali: dhunge=stone, dhara=tap or spout) and ponds next to them but only a few still exist now.

The gates defined the boundary of the town in ancient times but current administrative maps extends the area of Sankhu beyond the gates. The existing five gates are:

1. Bhau Dhwakha (Bride Gate) - This is the main entry gate of Sankhu. In local tradition, this gate is used whenever new bride is introduced to the town.

2. Sangal Dhwakha or Mhyamachaa Dhwakha (Daughter Gate) - It is the gate from which to bid farewell to a daughter who is married off.

3. Dhunlla Dhwakha or Dya Dhwakha - This gate is important for Bajrayogini festival. All kinds of ritual processions including the chariot of Bajrayogini enter through this gate.

4. Mahadyo Dhwakha or Si Dhwakha: Dead bodies from Sankhu are taken out to funeral through this gate.

5. Naari Dhwakha : During the Shalinadi festival, the Holy god Madhav Narayan along with the devotees are taken in and out of the town through this gate. ‘Naari’ is the local name for Shalinadi river.

== Bajrayogini Temple ==
Mt. Manichuda (2403m), a holy mountain, lies to the north of Sankhu. A lake also named Manichuda lies near the mountain. The temple of Vajrayogini (Bajrayogini, Khadgayogini), the main identity of Sankhu, lies on the on middle of Manichuda.

Locally, in Newari language, the goddess is known both as 'Mhasukhwamaju' (Nepal Bhasa:म्हासुख्वा माजु) which means yellow faced Mistress and 'Hyaunkhwaamaju' (Nepal Bhasa:ह्याउंख्वा माजु) which means red faced Mistress.

The temple enshrines more sacred representations for this site : The Ugra-tara manifesting as Ekazati, which is said to give very powerful blessings, particularly the image in the upper temple. The image in the lower temple is red in colour with one face and four arms, two of which hold a skull-cup (kapala) and knife at her heart, and the remaining two hold a sword and an utpala, a blue lotus.

In the upper temple is an identical image of Ugra-tara in bell metal, in which her left leg is outstretched. In the upper temple is also the loom of the Nepali Princess Bhrikuti, queen of the Tibetan king Songtsen Gampo. In both the upper and lower temples, Bajrayogini is flanked Baghini and Singhini, the Tiger and Lion-headed Yoginis. In the same upper room in the upper temple is a solid bronze standing Buddha and a standing Lokeshvara. Below this shrine room is a small room containing self-arisen (Swayambhu) stupa in stone.

On the hill behind there is a courtyard in the centre of which is a basin containing the “Water of the Kalpa” which never dries up. In the building immediately to the left of the stairs, there is also an eternal fire or “Fire of the Kalpa”. Further up, on top of the hill, is the Mani-linga.

=== Swasthani Temple ===
The Swasthani temple lies in the bank of Salinadi.

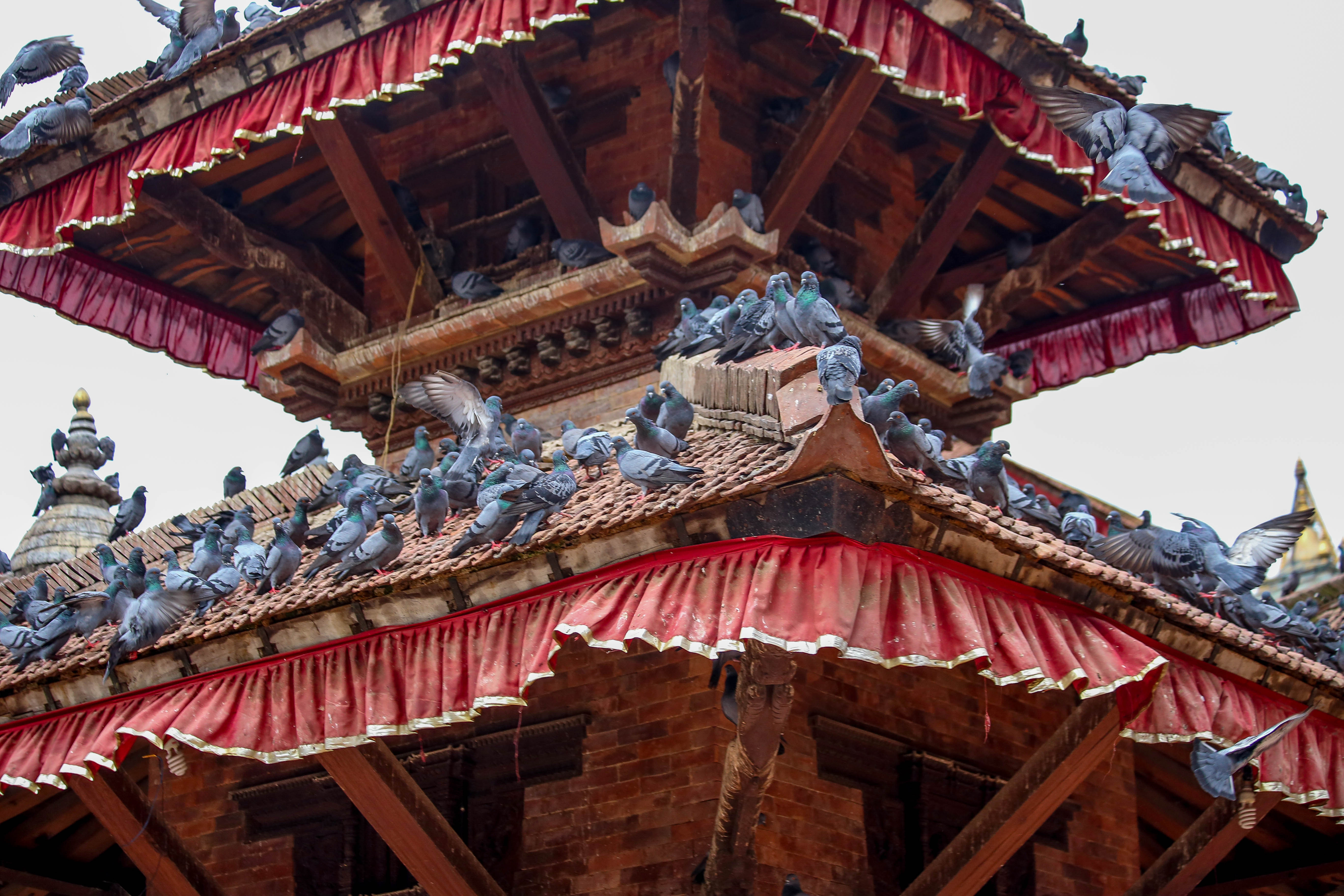
Bajrayogini Temple

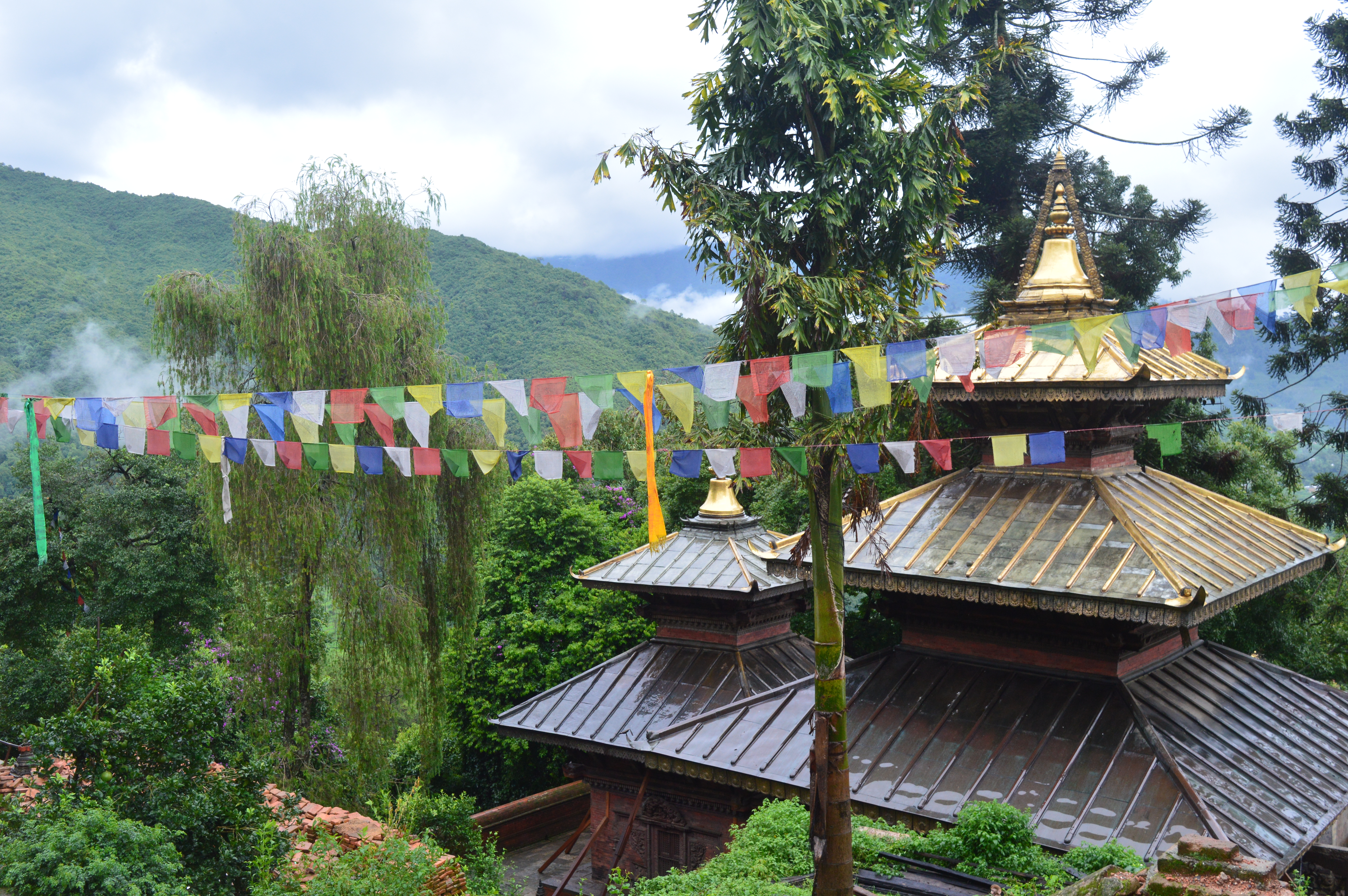
Bajrayogini Temple View

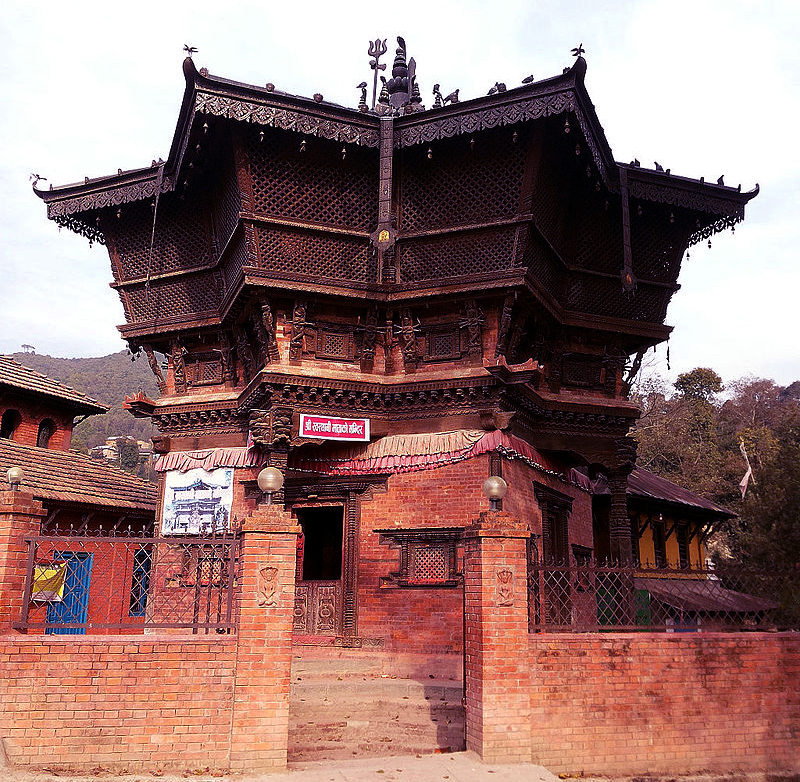
Swasthani Temple

== Festivals and pilgrimage ==
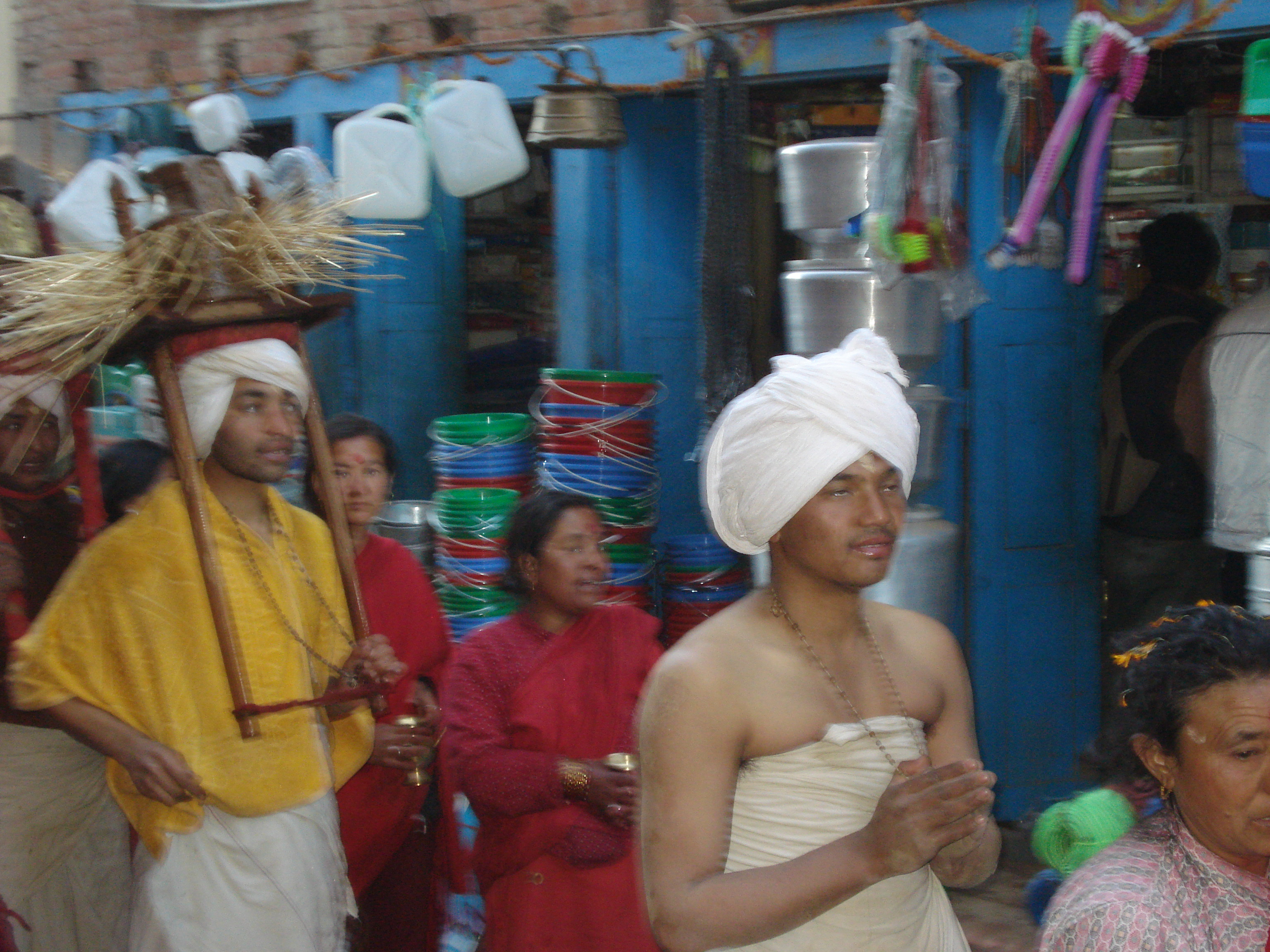
Sankhu fasting

=== Swasthani Barta Mela ===
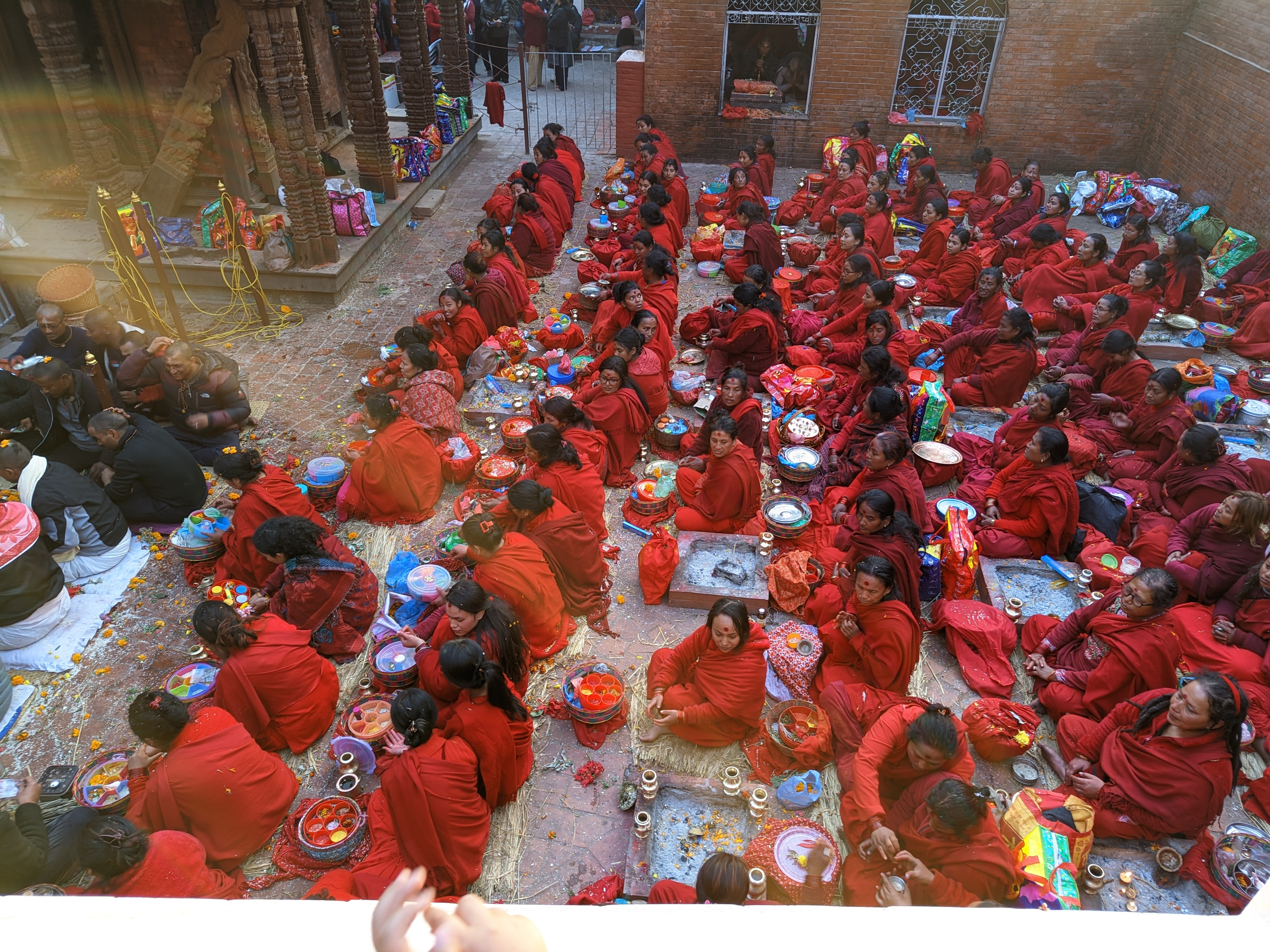
Devotees in Salinadi Barta (month long fasting)

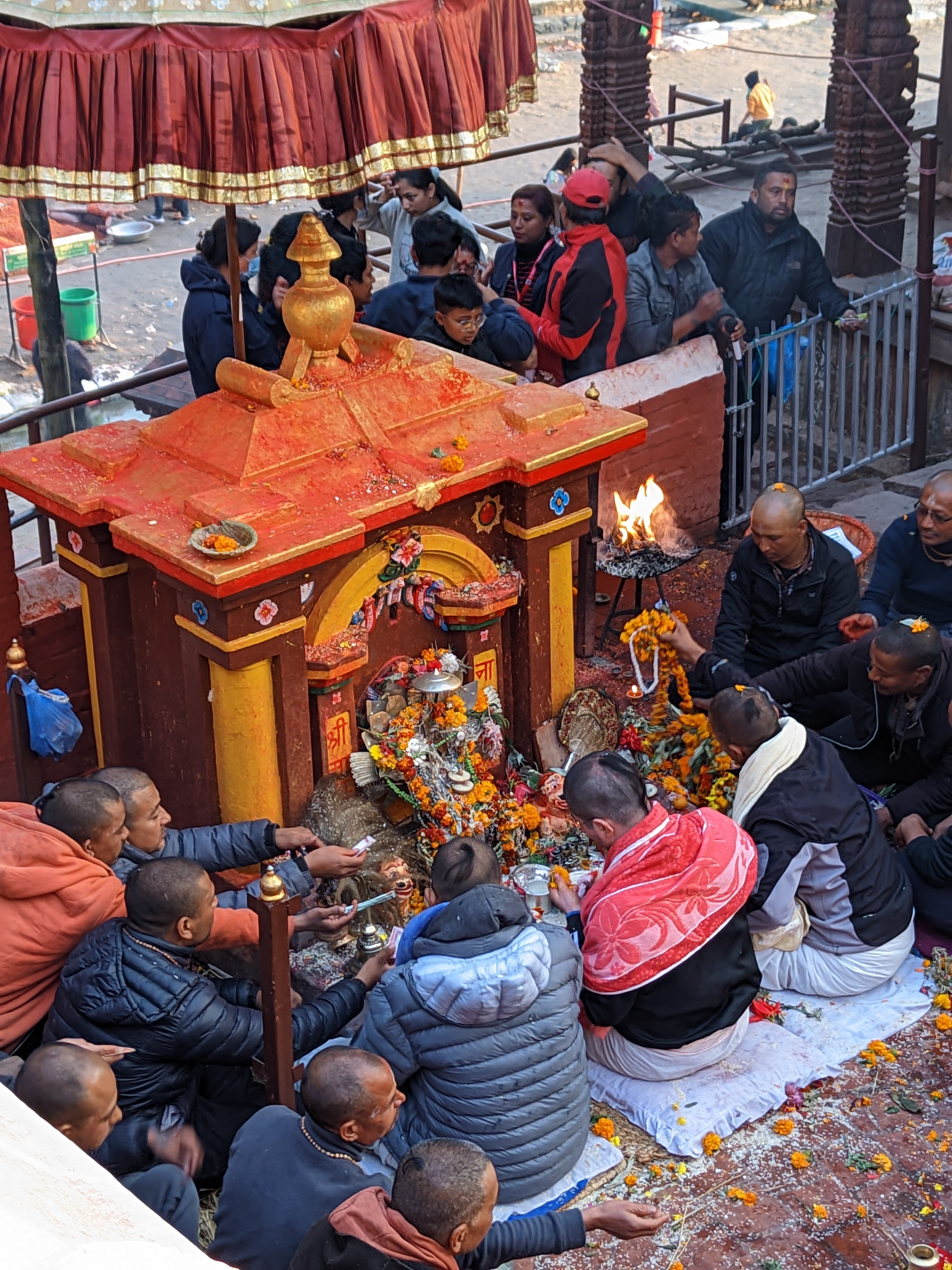
Priest worshipping Madhav Narayan with devotees during Salinadi Barta

A month-long worship to the God Madhav Narayan is done in Sankhu which is a Hindu festival based on the story of Swasthani. The vrata (fasting) is a tribute to the goddess through fasting, meditation and ritual bathing by women and men. It begins on the full moon of the Nepali month of Poush and ends on the full moon of the Nepali month of Magh. Men & women spend 30 days at the temple fasting, worshipping and meditating the god Madhav Narayan. It is believed anyone who perform this puja or fasting will have their wish granted.

Outside the temple, the riverbank of the Sali Nadi is thought to be the site where Goddess Parvati bathed during her month of meditations dedicated to Swasthani.

=== Festival of Vajrayogini ===
The festival of Vajrayogini occurs in Chaitra Sukla Astami (late March or early April). A nine days tradition jatra of Mhasukhwamaju and other Vaghini (Bagini), Singhini and a stupa shaped Buddha starts on the day of full moon (purnima) and continues for nine days.

The festival starts with announcement by performing a secret fire sacrifice to the black goddesses. Then the royal sword is brought form the kind of Kathmandu on the fourth days and wood is burned to produce sacred ashes in the temple. The statues of the goddess are brought to the town in special chariots, they are kept on different places on the basis of rotation within four gates of Sankhu and sacrifice is made on the next day. The fifth day of jatra is known as main jatra (Nepal Bhasa:मु: जात्रा) when goddesses are taken around Sankhu within four gates. The day to bring the goddess into Sankhu is called 'to be brought down' (Nepal Bhasa:क्वाहाँ बिज्या) and the day to take goddess is called 'to be taken up' (Nepal Bhasa:थाहाँ बिज्या). On Mu Bijya the festival is celebrated with a feast. Next day, secret rice offering is made to ghosts. Thenafter the statues are brought back to the temple.

== Damage by earthquake ==
The earthquake of 2015 destroyed or damaged 750 (out of 960) houses. Many buildings that had survived a 1934 quake did not survive in 2015. Most of the building were traditional brick masonry building with Newari Architecture

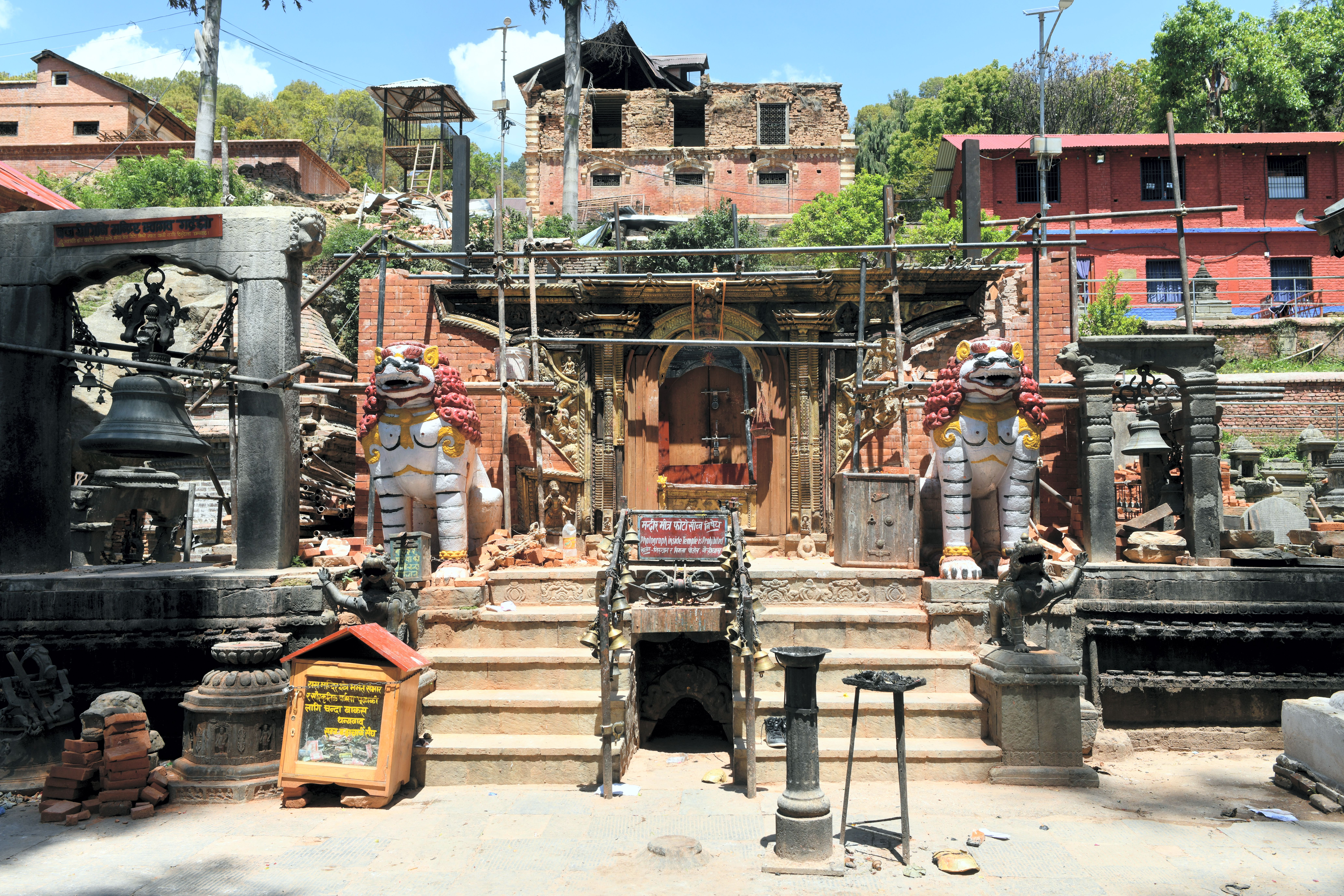

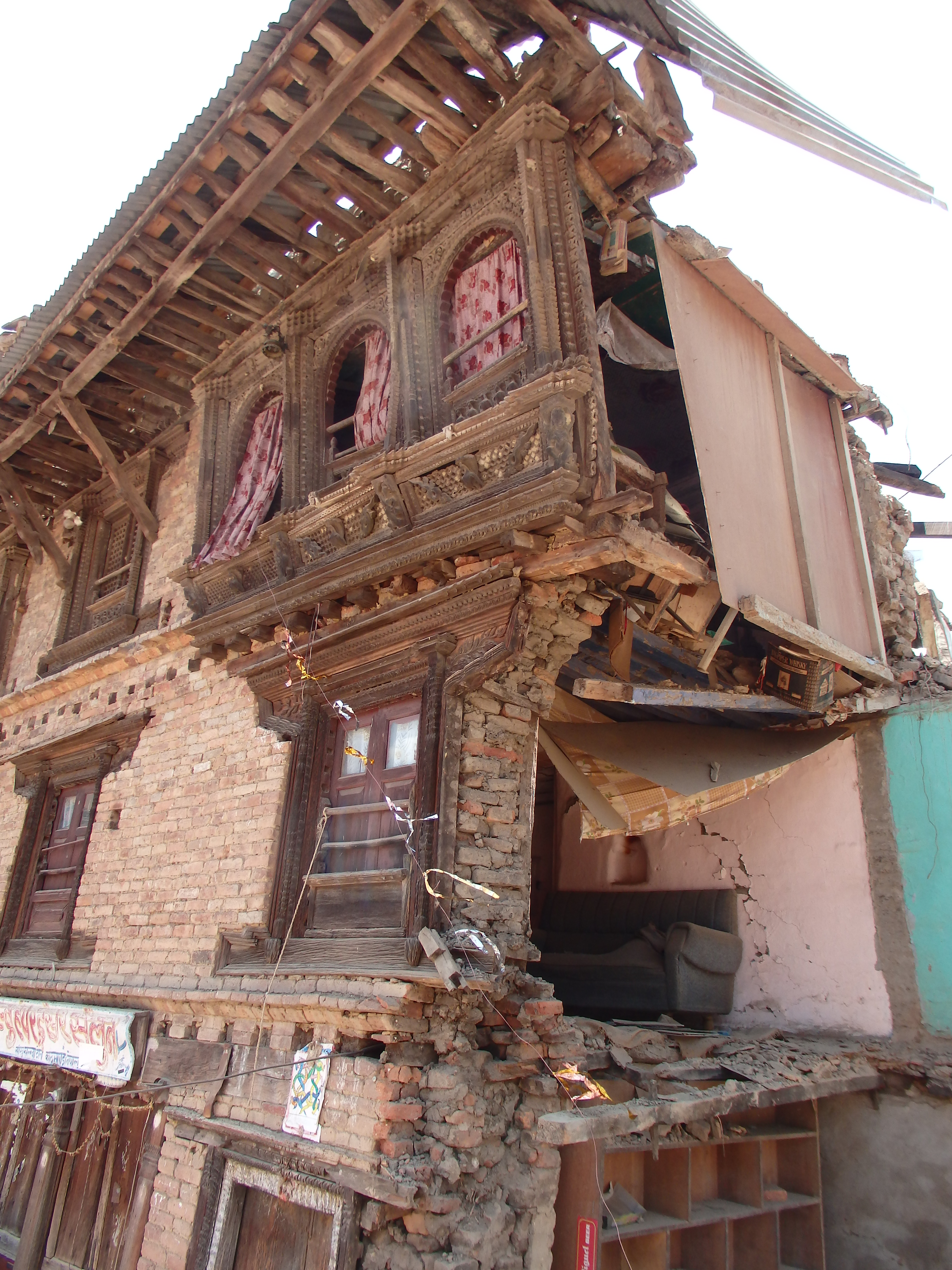

== Gallery ==
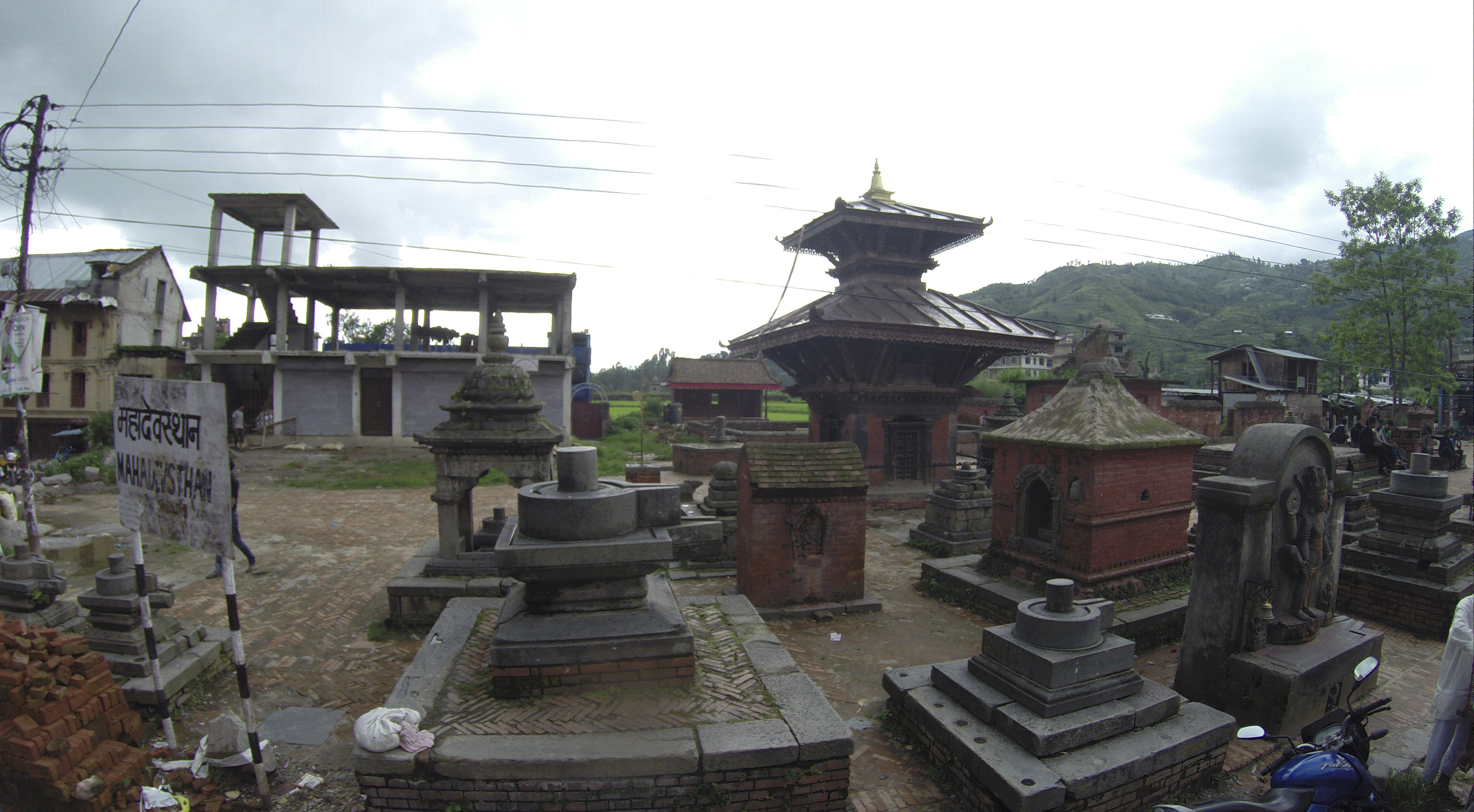
Temples and Shivalingas in Salkha Mahadevsthan, Sankhu

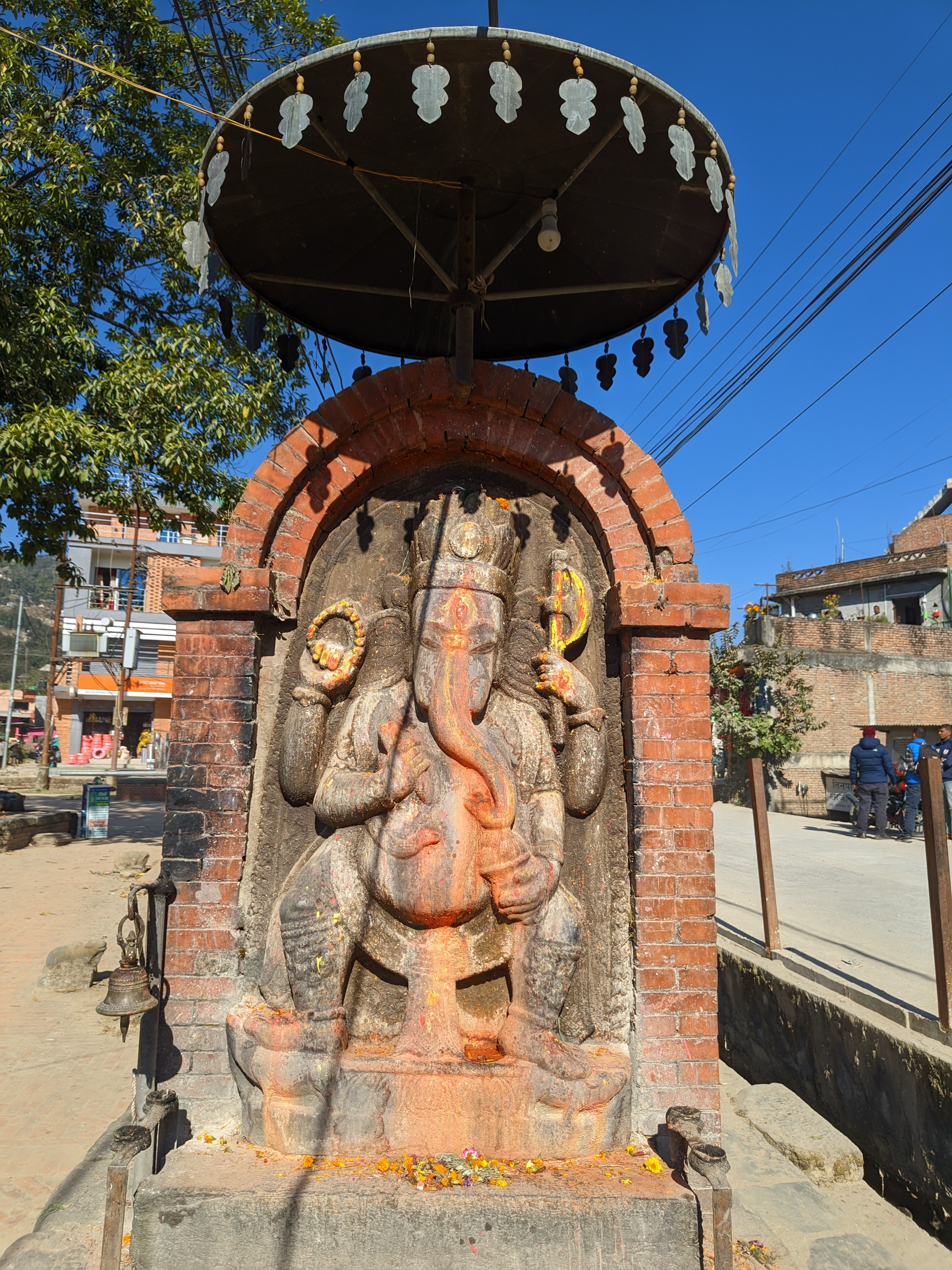
Ganesh in Salkha, Sankhu

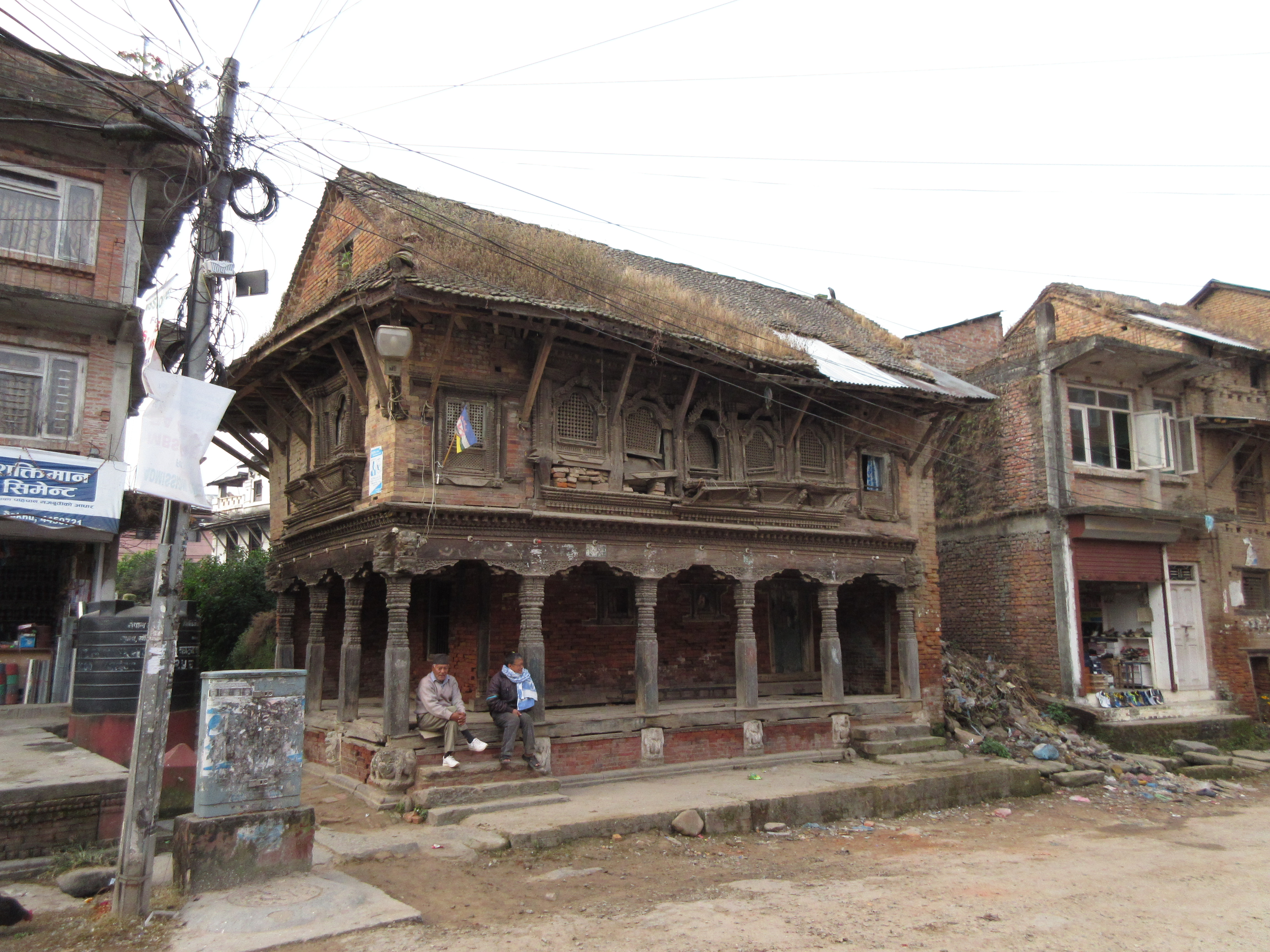

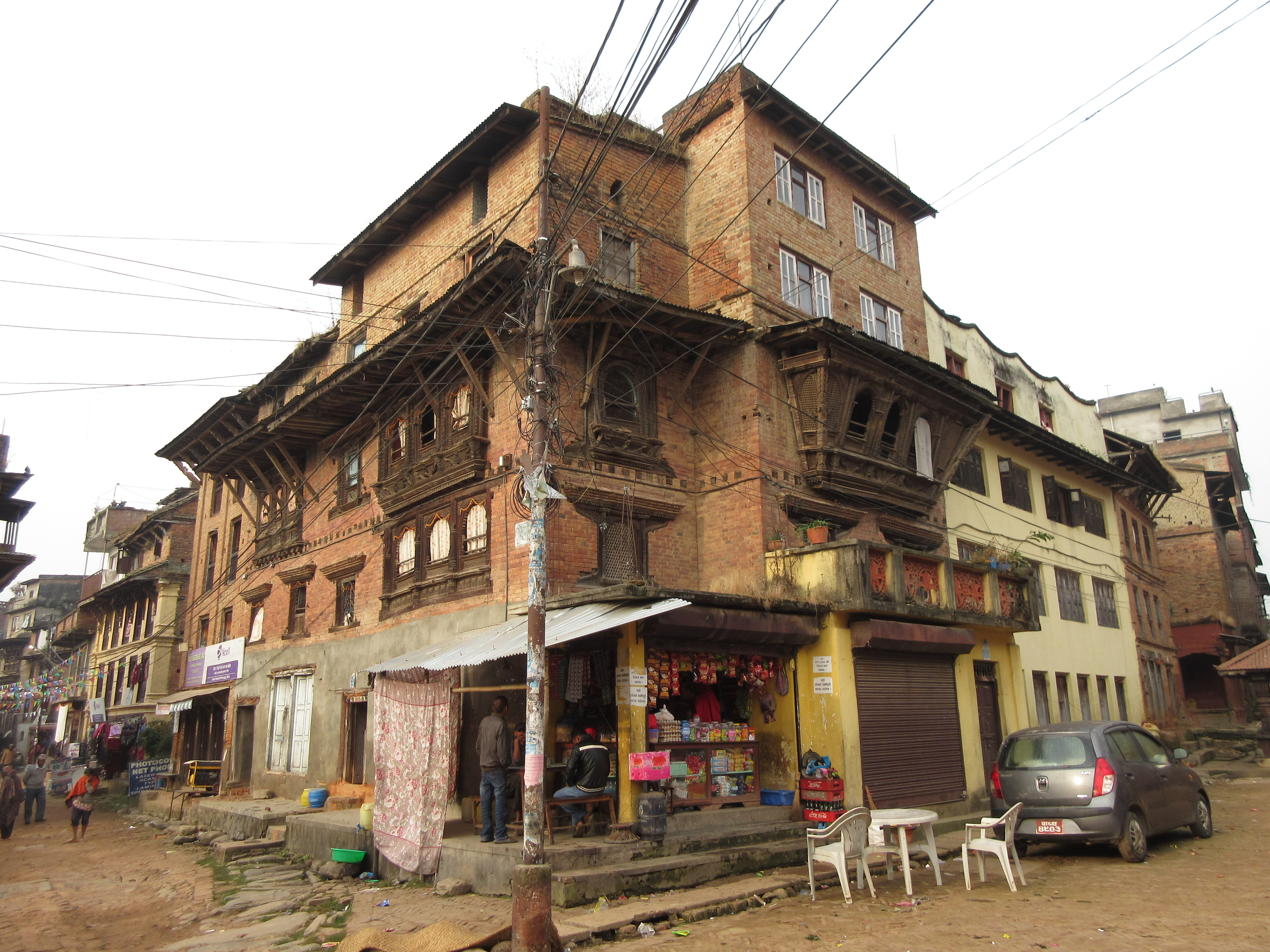

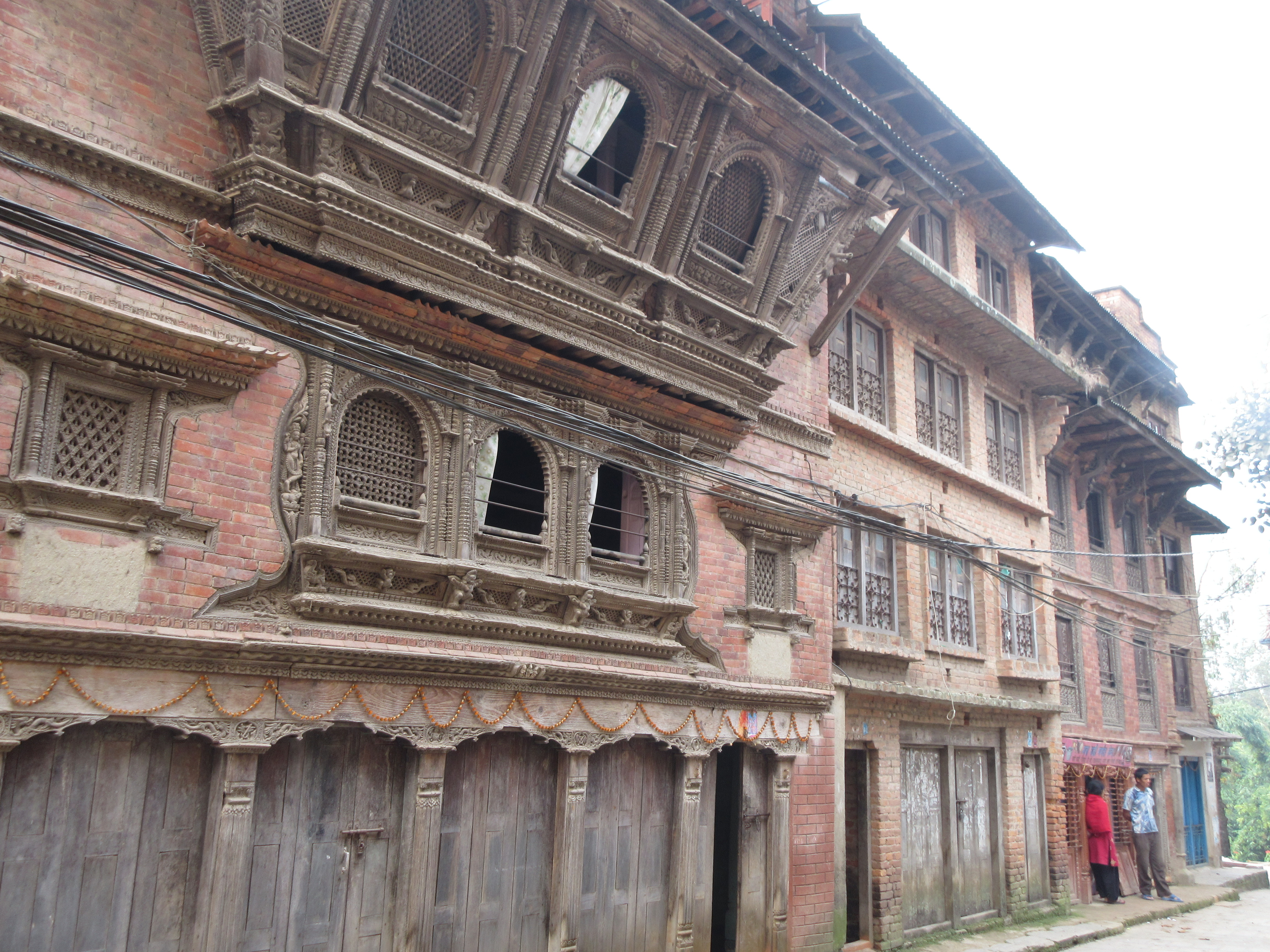

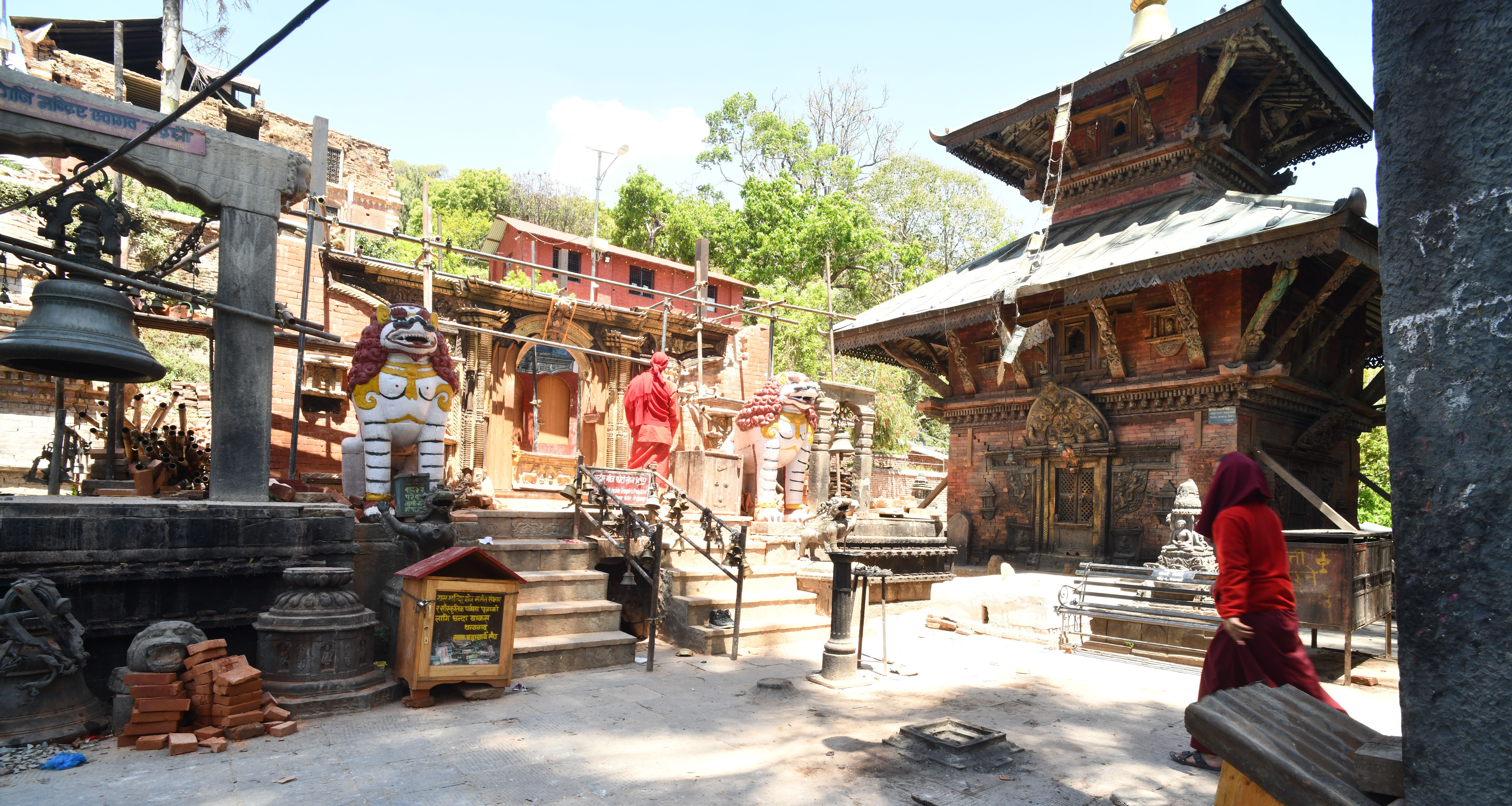
Bajrayogini temple after April 2015 Nepal earthquake

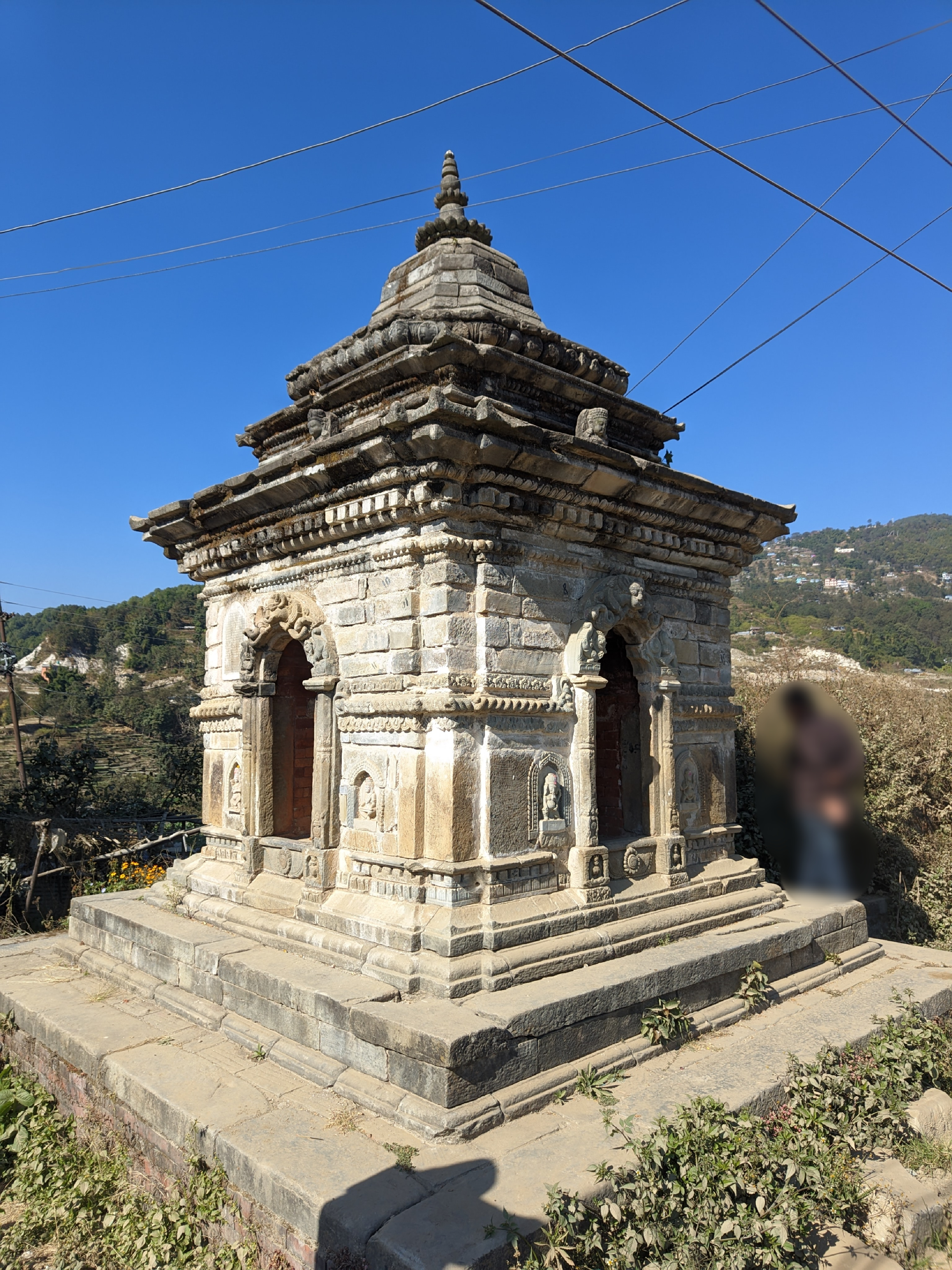
Mahadev Temple made of stone in Dhunlla, Sankhu

== Notes ==
Padmasambhava of Kathmandu made a pilgrimage to Sankhu where he met Shakyadevi and took her to Yangleshö. Vairotsana, leaving Tibet after his teachings were slandered, stopped in Nepal and offered a golden icon to the monastery of Sankhu. Guru Rinpoche left a number of termas in Sankhu and around.

== See also ==
- Palubari, a nearby village
- Vajrayogini, the deity
