= Shankharapur =

Shankharapur Municipality शंखरापुर नगरपालिका
- Municipality
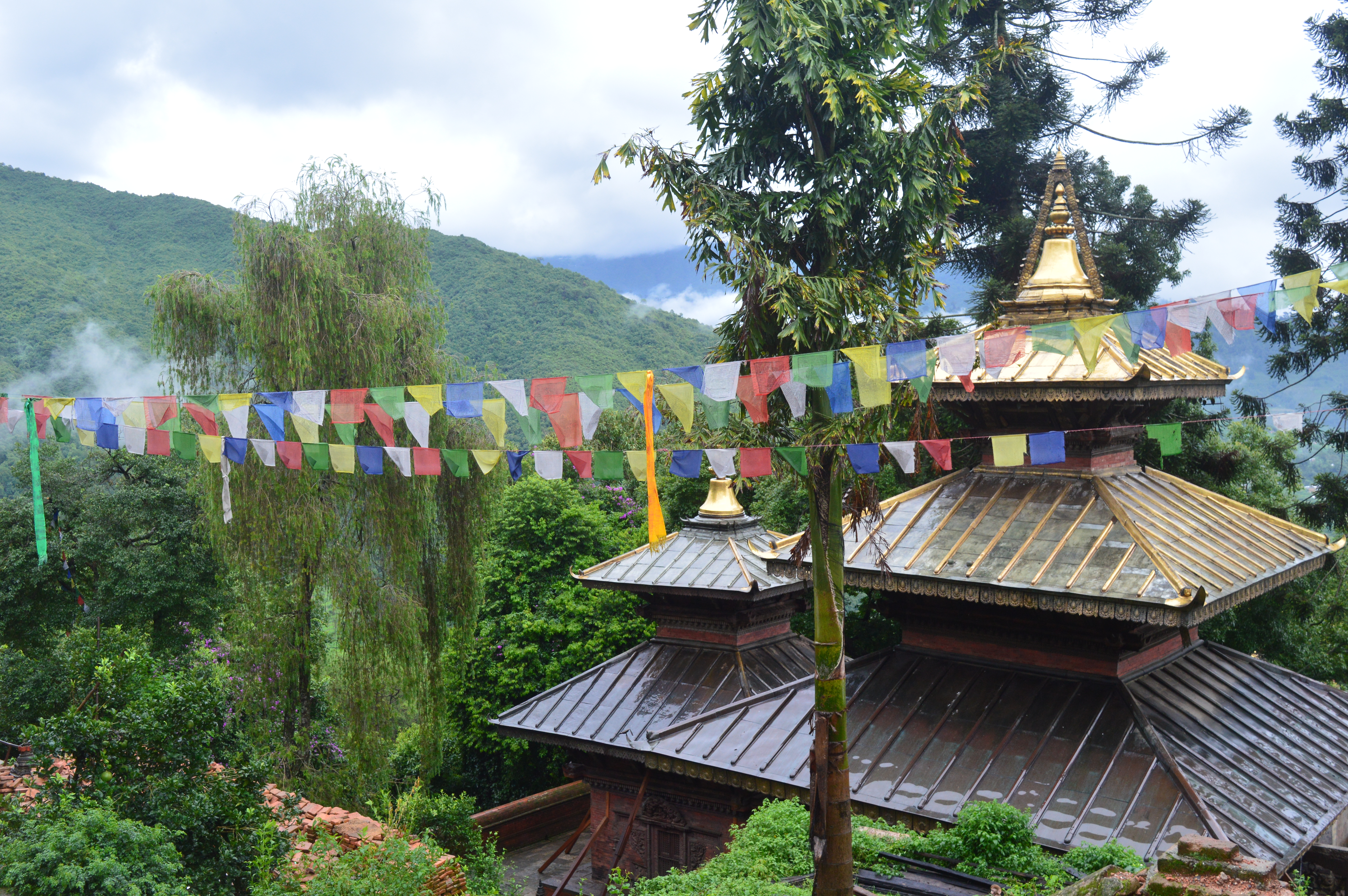
- Bajrayogini Temple in Bajrayogini

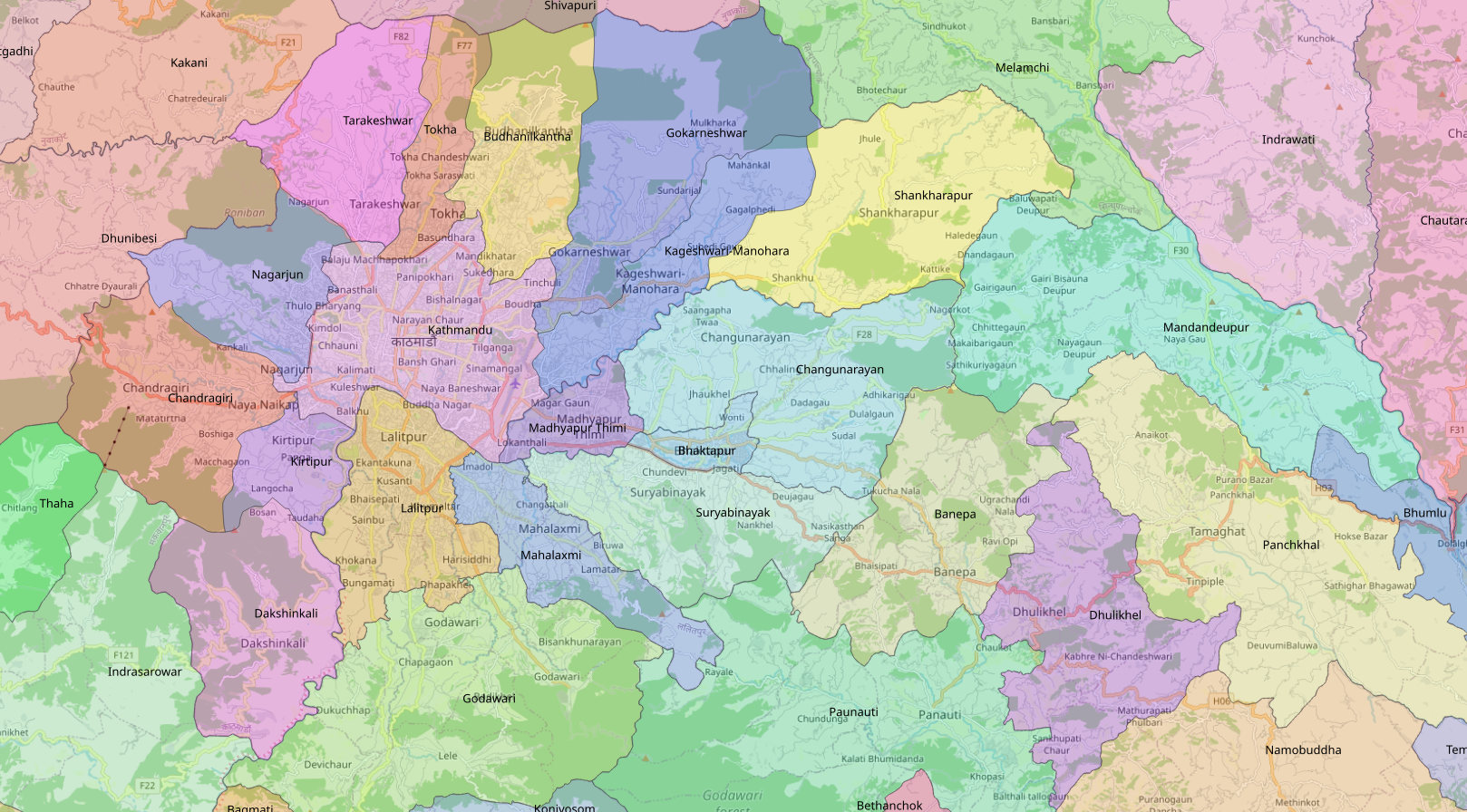

- Location in Nepal Shankharapur Municipality (Nepal)
- Coordinates: 27°44′48″N 85°30′35″E
- Country: Nepal
- Province: Bagmati Province
- District: Kathmandu
- Established: December 2014

Government
  - Type: Local Level
  - Mayor: Ramesh Napit (RPP)
  - Deputy Mayor: Samita Shrestha (NC)

Area
  - Total: 60.21 km^{2} (23.25 sq mi)

Population (2021 Nepal census)
  - Total: 29,318
  - Density: 486.9/km^{2} (1,261/sq mi)
  - Ethnicities: Newar Bahun Chhetri Tamang Magar
- Time zone: UTC+5:45 (NST)
- Website: www.shankharapurmun.gov.np/en

Shankharapur is a municipality in Kathmandu District in Bagmati Province of Nepal that was established on 2 December 2014 by merging the former Village development committees Bajrayogini, Karkigaun, Bhulbu, Indrayani, Lapsiphedi, Naglebhare, Pukhulachhi and Suntol. The office of the municipality is that of the former Pukhulachhi village development committee in the old Newar's town of Sankhu.

In the Local Level Election 2079, Ramesh Napit of Rastriya Prajatantra Party was elected as mayor securing 3,731 votes and Samita Shrestha of Nepali Congress was elected as Deputy Mayor securing 5,658 votes.

== Demographics ==
At the time of the 2011 Nepal census, Shankharapur Municipality had a population of 25,558. Of these, 41.1% spoke Nepali, 34.9% Tamang, 23.2% Nepal Bhasa, 0.1% Bhojpuri, 0.1% Gurung, 0.1% Magar, 0.1% Maithili, 0.1% Rai, 0.1% Sherpa and 0.1% other languages as their first language.

In terms of ethnicity/caste, 35.1% were Tamang, 25.1% Newar, 18.5% Chhetri, 14.2% Hill Brahmin, 1.4% other Dalit, 0.8% Gharti/Bhujel, 0.8% Kami, 0.8% Magar, 0.7% Gurung, 0.6% Damai/Dholi, 0.5% Thakuri, 0.4% Sunuwar, 0.2% Rai, 0.1% Danuwar, 0.1% Lhomi, 0.1% Musalman, 0.1% Sanyasi/Dasnami, 0.1% Sarki, 0.1% Sherpa, 0.1% other Terai and 0.4% others.

In terms of religion, 64.3% were Hindu, 34.5% Buddhist, 1.1% Christian and 0.1% Muslim.

In terms of literacy, 71.9% could read and write, 1.9% could only read and 26.1% could neither read nor write.

The population of the municipality grew to 29,318 at the 2021 Nepal census. Around 99.9% of the residents were Nepali citizens and 80% were literate in 2021.
