= Bajrayogini Temple =

Newar Buddhist temple in Nepal

- बज्रयोगिनी मन्दिर
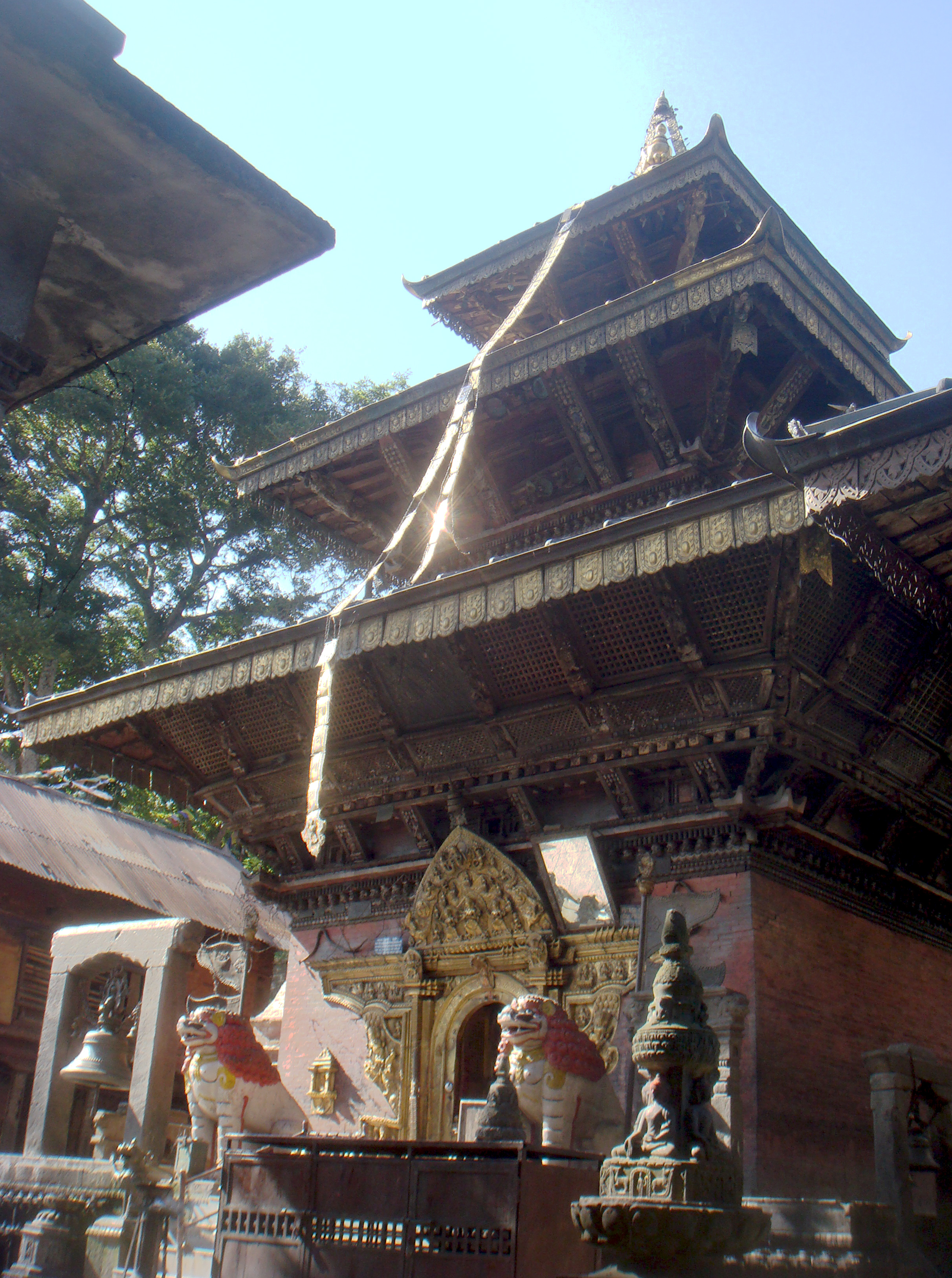
- Vajrayogini Temple at Bajrayogini

- Location in Kathmandu

Religion
- Affiliation: Hinduism
- District: Kathmandu
- Deity: Bajrayogini

Location
- Location: Sankhu
- Country: Nepal
- Coordinates: 27.747°N 85.483°E

Bajrayogini Temple (Nepali: बज्रयोगिनी मन्दिर) is a Tantric Buddhist temple located at Sakwa in Nepal's Kathmandu Valley. It is also well known as Bodhisattva's Temple. The temple is actually a sort of temple complex, with the main temple having been built by King Pratap Malla in the sixteenth century. Vajrayogini is a Buddhist tantric deity, she is also conflated with Ugra Tara, a form of the Buddhist dharmapala Ekajati. However, the temple is sacred to both Buddhists and Hindus.

The Bajrayogini Temple is situated roughly 20 kilometres northeast of Kathmandu. The area where it is located is often referred to as Gunbaha, which can be roughly translated from Newari as ‘recreational forest place’. The main temple is a three-story high building, which was carefully constructed with the utmost attention to detail. Inside the temple is a statue of the goddess Bajrayogini featuring a red face with three eyes as well as hands, which have the thumb and middle finger carefully, decorated. The statue is surrounded by ornaments.

== Mythology ==
According to a holy book, which was once discovered long ago, the site of the temple was once a forked piece of stone which spouted fire. This was quite significant as the rest of the world was covered with snow. In that place emerged a five-colored flame, which came to be the volcanic goddess. The goddess ordered that a temple be built on the sight of her emergence and since then the priests have been making use of the nine surrounding caves for centuries to serve this temple. The first priest to serve here was supposedly given superior enlightenment and Bajrayogini is considered to be one of the wisest and strongest gods able to grant this gift. There is a beautiful water tap complete with decorative statue in the area which dates back to the fourth century. The attraction here is not only the various temples but also many other interesting temples and caves which surround it – some of which are considered to be older than the temple itself. Amongst the caves in the area is a carved double chamber with window attributed to being used by Marpa Lotsawa. Whereas nearby is a tiny chamber built into a small cliff which was where Milarepa, one of Tibet's most prominent yogis, was walled in for solitary retreat.

Within the legends of Manisaila Mahavadana, Vajrayogini is said to have drained the lake water from the Sankhu Valley with her curved knife. She also appeared before the temple priest Jogdev and instructed King Sankhadev to build the town of Sankhu in the shape of a conch shell. The oldest inscription at Sankhu which dates back to 538 CE attests to this.

The hill top is accessed by a very long carved stone stairway. The entire site is covered richly with Newari architectural metal work, carved wood details, and ancient artifacts; including a small stupa claimed to pre-date Buddha Shakyamuni.

== Jatra/Festivities ==
Bajrayogini Jatra is very famous among local Newar Community, and hence, people from the locality gather to observe and celebrate the Bajrayogini Jatra festival each April.

During the Kaligad Sambat in 1801, King Shankhadev created the Shankharapur town, according to history. King Shankhadeva began the Jatra of Bajrayogini from Kaligad Sambat 1818 after founding the village. The Bajrayogini region is also known as the birthplace of the Bajracharyas.

== 2015 earthquake ==
The earthquake that struck on 25 April 2015 had immense effect on Sankhu. Bajrayogini temple was no exception. The temple was not marked safe by the engineers. Renovation of the temple is necessary in order to assure safety. The statues of Bajrayogini temple are safely shifted and the temple is supported with wooden planks.

== See also ==
- Bajrayogini
- Cakrasaṃvara Tantra
- Nepal earthquake
- Sankhu

== Sources ==
- Bangdel, Dina (1999). Manifesting the Maṇḍala: A Study of the Core Iconographic Program of Newar Buddhist Monasteries in Nepal (PhD). The Ohio State University. OCLC 55970062.
- Shrestha, Bal Gopal (2012). The Sacred Town of Sankhu:The Anthropology of Newar Ritual, Religion and Society in Nepal. Newcastle upon Tyne: Cambridge Scholars Publishing. ISBN 978-0861713295. OL 26748847M.
- Locke, John K. (1988). "Vajrayogini Temple of Samkhu". Buddhist Himalaya. 1 (11).
- Sharma, Dilli Raj; Shrestha, Tek Bahadur (2016). Sankhu: Historical and Cultural Heritage (1 ed.). Kirtipur: Centre for Nepal and Asian Studies, Tribhuvan University. ISBN 978-9937-0-0505-0. OL 26744747M.
- English, Elizabeth (2002). Vajrayoginī:Her Visualizations, Rituals, & Forms. Boston: Wisdom Publications. pp. xxvii–xxviii. ISBN 978-1443837705.
- "Vajrayogini and early settlement of sankhu". UNESCO World Heritage List. UNESCO.
