= Swasthani Barta (Fast) =

Religious observance in Nepal

Swasthani Vrata
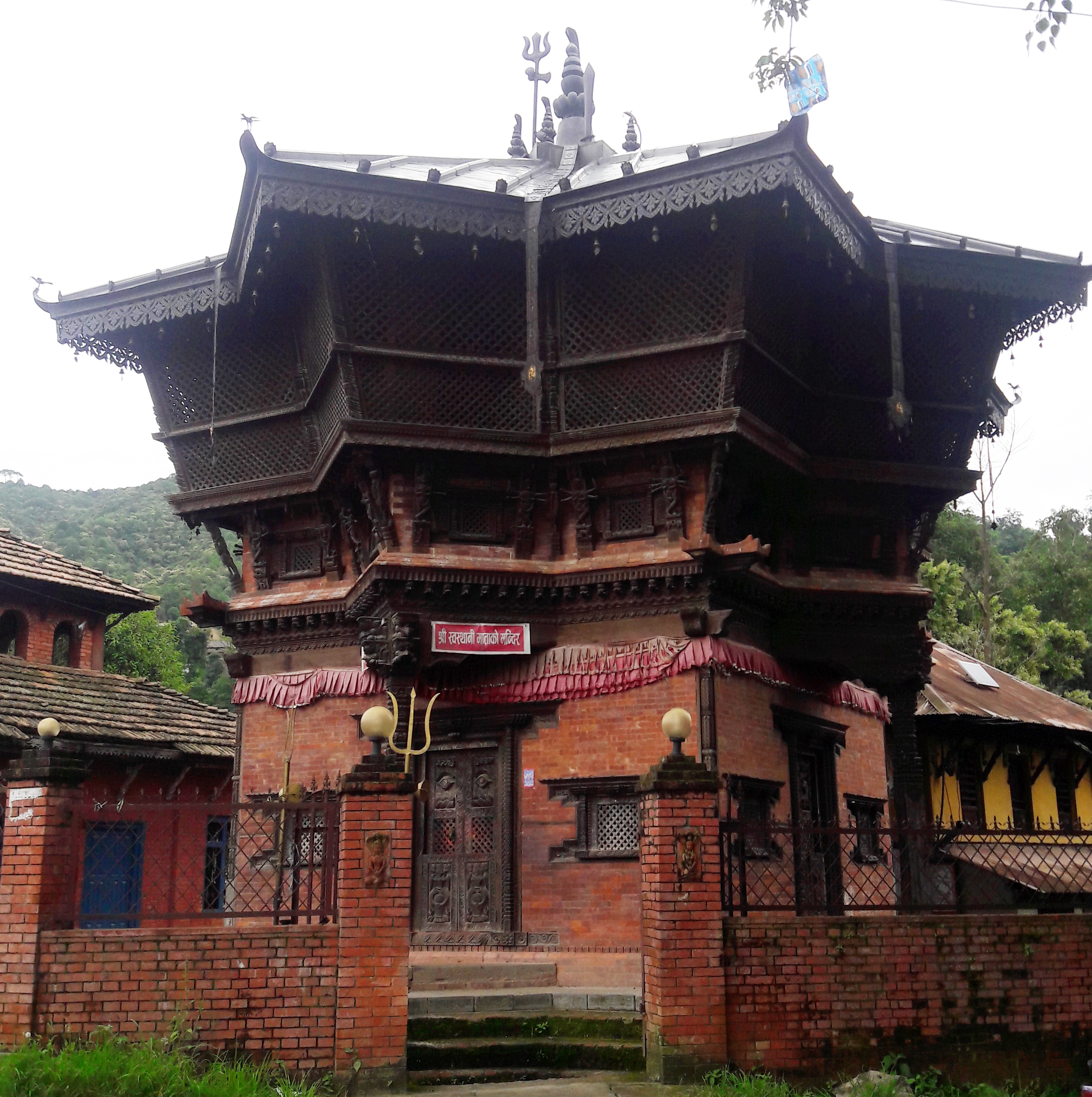
- Swasthani Temple at Sankhu in Nepal
- Observed by: Hindus in Nepal and Nepali-speaking communities
- Type: Hindu
- Significance: Belief that Goddess Swasthani grant blessings to the devoted, particularly those who observe the fast.
- Begins: Poush Shukla Purnima
- Ends: Magh Shukla Purnima
- Duration: One lunar month
- Frequency: Annual

Swasthani, also known as Shree Swasthani Mata and Swasthani Parameshwari, is a Hindu goddess worshipped primarily in Nepal. She is the central deity of the Swasthani Vrata (also called Brata or Barta), an annual month-long observance involving the reading or listening to the Swasthani Vrata Katha, devotional offerings and, for some participants, fasting. The tradition has historical roots in the Newar religious culture of the Kathmandu Valley and later spread widely among Nepali-speaking Hindu communities.

Swasthani is associated in devotional narratives with the granting of blessings, the restoration of prosperity, protection and family well-being. Her sacred story connects her worship to the lives of Goma, her son Navaraj and her daughter-in-law Chandravati, as well as to myths concerning Shiva, Sati, Parvati, Vishnu and other Hindu deities. The goddess, the sacred text and the annual vow constitute related but distinct parts of the tradition.

The earliest surviving Swasthani manuscript identified in published scholarly studies dates to 1573 CE. That is the date of the oldest known surviving textual witness, not an established date for the beginning of worship of the goddess. The possibility of an earlier oral or ritual history cannot be excluded, but its antiquity has not been determined from surviving evidence.

== Name and religious identity ==
The name is also written Svasthānī in scholarly transliteration; Swosthani is another spelling. Scholar Jessica Vantine Birkenholtz interprets the name as referring to one's own place, and discusses Swasthani as the "Goddess of One's Own Place". This has been examined in relation to household and community belonging, women's position in family life and the goddess's association with particular places.

The title Parameshwari expresses supreme divine status. Swasthani has been related to Shakti, the divine feminine power, and to the wider traditions of Shaivism and Shaktism. These connections do not mean that every account presents her as identical to Parvati. In the expanded narrative, Parvati observes the vow of Swasthani to obtain Shiva as her husband; in other representations Swasthani is depicted together with Shiva as a divine pair. Scholars have emphasized that her identity and relationship with other Hindu goddesses have varied across texts, images and periods.

== Iconography and material representations ==
Descriptions used in Swasthani worship give the goddess a golden radiance, three eyes and four arms. She is associated with such objects as a lotus, sword and shield, as well as gestures signifying protection and the granting of blessings. Different textual versions and illustrations vary in some particulars, including the arrangement of her attributes. The combination of weapons and blessing gestures represents both protective and benevolent powers.

=== Historical images ===
A stone sculpture of Shiva and Swasthani was consecrated in 1674 CE by King Pratap Malla of Kathmandu. It stands near Tana Bahal in the Makhan Tol area of the old city and has been identified through its inscription. An illuminated Newari-language manuscript dated 1808 CE likewise depicts Swasthani with Shiva. Such surviving representations are particularly significant because, for much of her documented history, the sacred book rather than a freestanding image served as the principal physical focus of Swasthani worship.

=== Association with the Mother Goddesses ===
A familiar modern image depicts Swasthani in the middle of a lotus surrounded by the Ashtamatrika, the Eight Mother Goddesses. This arrangement developed through ritual diagrams and printed illustrations. An 1885 printed edition, for example, contained a lotus-shaped diagram naming the Matrikas on its petals. Later images increasingly presented Swasthani herself in the central position. The resulting depiction became particularly widespread in printed Nepali-language Swasthani books; older Newari manuscripts often did not contain such illustrations.

== History of the textual tradition ==
=== Earliest manuscripts ===
The earliest surviving manuscript identified by modern scholarship dates to 1573 CE. It consists of eight narrow palm-leaf folios and is written in Sanskrit strongly influenced by Nepal Bhasa (Newari). Its relatively short story centers on Goma, Navaraj and Chandravati. The earliest surviving Newari-language manuscript identified in the same research dates to 1603 CE. Its combination of Newari storytelling with Sanskrit ritual passages illustrates the early multilingual character of the tradition.

The early text is much shorter than the widely circulated modern book. Its primary concern is the goddess's vow and its effects on the fortunes of a family, rather than an extensive account of the births, marriages and battles of Hindu gods. The oldest manuscript establishes that the tradition was written down by the sixteenth century; it does not reveal the precise date at which worship of Swasthani began.

=== Expansion and Puranic narratives ===
Beginning in the eighteenth century, successive manuscript versions incorporated additional mythology. Stories concerning Daksha, Sati, Shiva and Parvati, the birth of Ganesh and Kumar, divine conflicts and accounts of cosmic creation enlarged the text beyond its earlier family narrative. The expanded story came to resemble a regional Purana in its combination of mythology, ritual instructions, religious teaching and sacred geography.

The modern version commonly comprises 31 chapters arranged as a dialogue between Kumar, or Kartikeya, and the sage Agastya. This narrative frame differs from the early accounts in which Shiva tells the story to Parvati. Manuscript comparison demonstrates an evolving text, although the precise persons responsible for every addition cannot be identified.

=== Attribution to the Puranas ===
The closing formulas of printed Swasthani chapters conventionally associate the text with the Skanda Purana, particularly the Kedara Khanda and a description of the sacred month of Magh. Other early versions make different Puranic claims, including association with the Linga Purana. While individual stories also occur in broader Hindu literature, researchers have found no evidence that the complete Swasthani narrative was an independently existing part of the classical Sanskrit Puranas. Such attributions are accordingly examined as part of the history of the local text's claims to sacred authority.

=== Nepali-language and printed editions ===
The oldest surviving manuscript in the Nepali language identified by researchers dates to 1810 CE. The text subsequently circulated more widely among Nepali-speaking communities. In the late nineteenth and early twentieth centuries, editions were reproduced by printers in Varanasi, India, and distributed in Nepal and among Nepali speakers elsewhere. Printing encouraged the spread of more standardized editions while illustrations contributed to changing understandings of Swasthani's appearance.

Newari-language copies continued to be written and used after Nepali printed editions became widespread. The text's changing languages, scripts and publication practices have therefore been studied as evidence for larger religious and cultural changes in Nepal.

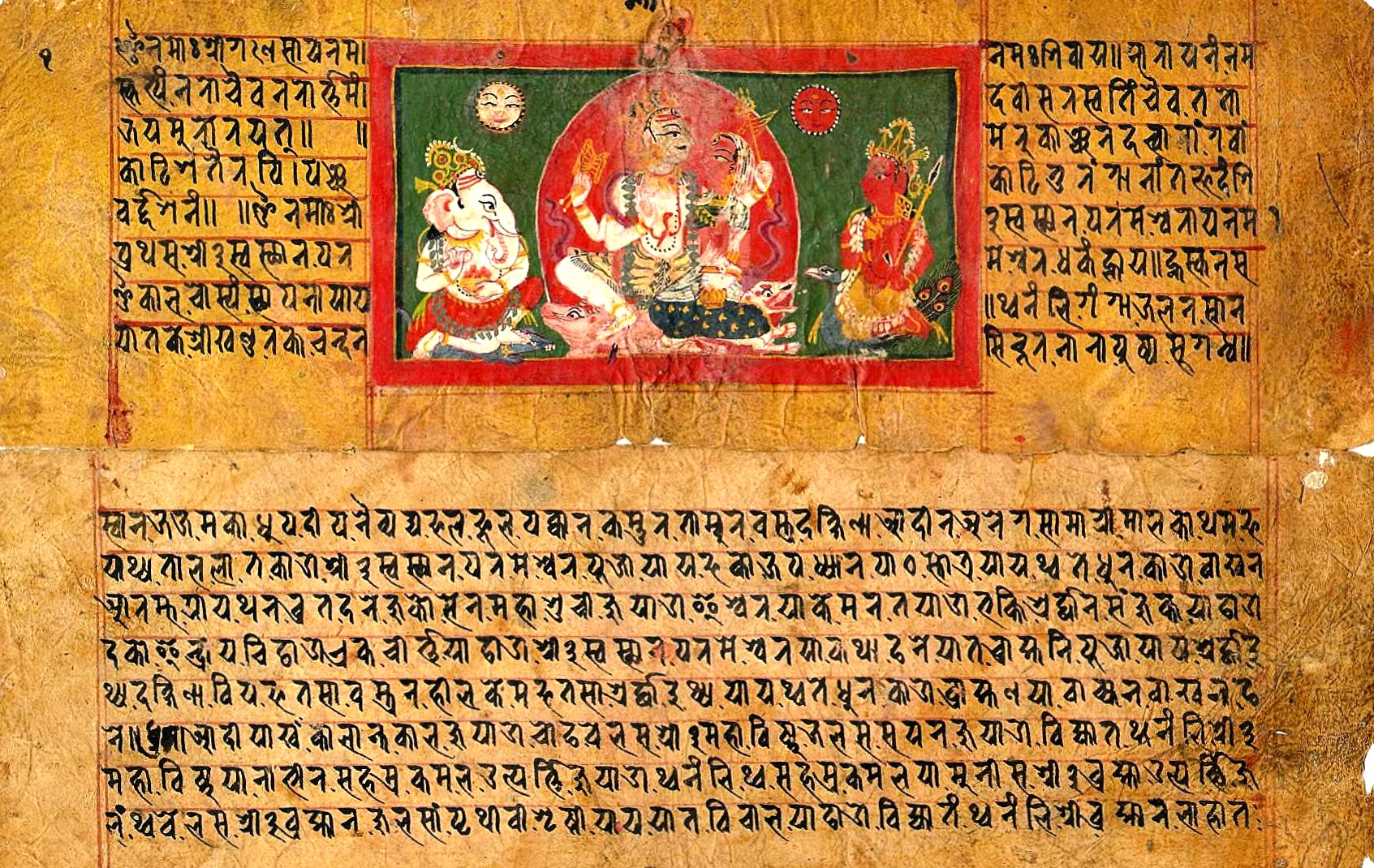
An 1819 Newari-language manuscript of the Swasthani story, preserved by the Asa Archives.

== Swasthani Vrata Katha ==
The Swasthani Vrata Katha is the sacred narrative read or recited during the annual observance. The modern text combines mythology concerning major Hindu deities with a distinctive Nepalese story about Goma and her family. The following account summarizes the narrative in the commonly circulated Nepali version; some events and details differ in earlier manuscripts.

=== Creation, Sati and Parvati ===
The opening chapters discuss creation and the cycle of the universe. Later episodes recount the marriage of Shiva and Sati, the conflict between Shiva and Sati's father Daksha, Sati's death at Daksha's sacrificial ceremony and Shiva's response. The account of the scattering of Sati's remains introduces sacred places associated with the Shakti Pithas. Parvati is subsequently born to the Himalayan royal family. She seeks Shiva as her husband and is instructed by Vishnu to undertake the Swasthani vow. These stories link the local goddess's devotional practice to wider Shaiva mythology.

Other episodes include the deeds of Ganesh and Kumar, Shiva's visits to places associated with Nepal, and narratives about demons and divine beings. One story describes Shiva wandering in the Pashupatinath region in the form of a deer. The text also recounts the serpent women (naginis) who perform Swasthani's vow and receive a blessing from the goddess.

=== Goma's birth, marriage and hardship ===
In the human-centered narrative, a Brahmin couple, Shiva Bhatta and his wife Sati, seek a child. Their daughter Goma is born miraculously in an episode involving cow dung. As a young girl, she encounters Shiva disguised as a mendicant and is cursed following an unsuccessful request for alms. She subsequently marries a much older Brahmin, Shiva Sharma. In the commonly circulated account, Goma is seven years old and her husband is seventy.

Goma is left in hardship after her husband's departure and death, and she raises their son Navaraj. After Navaraj marries Chandravati and leaves in search of his father, his wife returns to her parental home, leaving Goma alone. Seven sages visit Goma in the expanded Nepali account and teach her the Swasthani vow. She performs the ritual in difficult circumstances and receives the support of local children who attend her recitations. Her son eventually returns.

=== Navaraj's kingship ===
Navaraj is directed toward the kingdom of Lavanyadesh, whose ruler has died. The king's ministers release a ceremonial elephant to select a successor. It chooses Navaraj, who is crowned ruler. In the expanded Nepali story he also marries Lavanyavati, daughter of the previous king. Goma is brought to the palace and participates in the coronation, marking a dramatic reversal of her previous poverty and isolation. The story attributes Navaraj's good fortune to the merits of his mother's observance of the vow.

=== Chandravati's suffering and reconciliation ===
When arrangements are made for Chandravati to travel to the palace, her attendants encounter celestial women performing the Swasthani vow. Chandravati rejects and dishonors the sacred offerings brought to her. The narrative then describes a storm, the collapse of a bridge over the Salinadi, and Chandravati's years of illness and deprivation. She eventually receives instruction in the vow, undertakes it, and is restored to health. Chandravati is reunited with Navaraj and Goma at the palace.

The Goma–Navaraj–Chandravati narrative foregrounds themes of suffering, piety, social position, family relationships and the consequences of honoring or disrespecting the goddess. Scholarly research has examined how this story was retained even as the text acquired a much larger body of Puranic material.

== Annual worship and observance ==
The Swasthani Vrata begins on the full moon of the lunar month of Poush (Poush Shukla Purnima) and ends on the full moon of Magh (Magh Shukla Purnima). It generally takes place in January and February, although Gregorian dates vary from year to year. In many households, the sacred story is read or heard in installments throughout the month. The book may be placed on a prepared worship surface and honored with lamps, flowers, incense and offerings. Families can participate in reading the narrative even if no member observes the full fast.

=== Preparation and commencement of the vow ===
The traditional Swasthani Vrata begins on Poush Shukla Purnima and concludes on Magh Shukla Purnima. The printed ritual instructions, known as the pujavidhi, describe preparations beginning on Poush Shukla Chaturdashi, the preceding lunar day.

According to these instructions, a person undertaking the formal vow prepares through bathing, trimming the nails, maintaining ritual cleanliness and consuming a single prescribed meal. The traditional instructions also describe sleeping separately on the floor upon a woollen covering.

On the following full-moon morning, the devotee bathes and makes a formal declaration of intention, or sankalpa, to observe the vow, listen to the sacred narrative throughout the month and complete the concluding worship on Magh Purnima.

=== Daily observance and fasting ===
The formal vow includes daily bathing, restricted meals, worship and religious recitation. Traditional accounts describe bathing before sunrise and eating only one meal daily, prepared according to the dietary restrictions of the observance. Some forms of the vow exclude salt, spices and meat.

Daily worship is traditionally performed around midday. In the evening, devotees gather to read or listen to the Swasthani Vrata Katha. Family members and visitors who do not undertake the full fast may also participate in the recitation and associated offerings.

The strictness of fasting and the precise ritual requirements differ between households and local communities.

=== Preparation of the worship space ===
The pujavidhi describes preparing a purified worship area with ritual vessels, lamps, incense, flowers, uncooked rice, sandalwood paste, water and other offerings.

An eight-petalled sacred diagram, or yantra, is drawn on a copper plate using sandalwood and saffron paste. The instructions also describe forming a Shiva linga from sand and arranging the ritual plates and offerings around it.

The worshipper traditionally sits facing east. Before the principal worship of Swasthani, preliminary invocations and offerings are made to the ritual lamp, Ganesh, the kalash water vessel and other deities.

The extended liturgy includes reverence to the Mother Goddesses, sages, protective divinities and figures from the Swasthani narrative, including Goma, Shiva Sharma, Navaraj and Chandravati.

=== Worship of Swasthani Mata ===
After the preliminary worship, the principal deity is invoked in the centre of the eight-petalled diagram.

The ritual meditation describes Swasthani as a golden-complexioned, three-eyed and four-armed goddess, seated upon a lion throne and holding attributes associated with protection and divine blessings.

The offerings described in the ritual text include sacred water, panchamrit (a mixture of milk, yoghurt, clarified butter, honey and sugar), sandalwood paste, flowers, garlands, sacred threads, incense, lamps, fruits and prepared foods.

Devotees recite invocations, offer salutations and meditate upon the goddess. The elaborate form of worship includes mantras for individual offerings and prayers requesting divine grace and spiritual merit.

=== Recitation of the Swasthani Vrata Katha ===
The religious narrative is traditionally read or heard throughout the lunar month. The commonly circulated Nepali version consists of 31 chapters.

The sacred book is itself treated as an object of worship. During recitation, it may be placed upon a prepared surface and honoured with flowers, lamps and other offerings.

Traditional recitations begin with auspicious prayers invoking divine blessings and knowledge. After the reading, participants perform pushpanjali, offering flowers while reciting concluding prayers.

Listeners may gather around the sacred book, offer salutations and receive prasad. Worship of the text is also performed by households whose members are not observing the formal fast.

=== Concluding worship on Magh Purnima ===
The vow concludes with a special ceremony on the full moon of Magh, traditionally involving more elaborate worship and offerings than the ordinary daily observance.

The pujavidhi prescribes sets of 108 ritual offerings. These include unbroken rice grains, jasmine and other flowers, cotton wicks, betel leaves, betel nuts, rotis, sweet cakes known as malpuwa, fruits and other prepared foods.

The instructions also describe 108 repetitions of the goddess's name, the lighting of 108 cotton wicks and 108 circumambulations as part of the elaborate ritual.

The concluding ceremony may include the distribution of food, monetary donations and offerings to invited participants.

=== Distribution of prasad ===
Traditional instructions prescribe separating eight portions from each group of 108 offerings and allocating the remaining one hundred portions according to the ritual observance.

The eight portions are traditionally offered to the devotee's husband. If she has no husband, the instructions prescribe offering them to a son, or, in his absence, the son of a ritual friend. If none is available, the offerings are ceremonially released into flowing water.

The ritual text associates this distribution with the completion of the vow and the fulfilment of the devotee's religious intentions.

These prescriptions reflect the historical domestic and social setting of the tradition and do not necessarily describe the practice of every contemporary household.

=== Regional and household variations ===
The month-long Swasthani observance takes different forms across Nepalese communities.

Many households participate principally through daily recitation and relatively simple offerings, while others undertake the formal fasting vow and prescribed ceremonies.

At Sankhu, the tradition is closely associated with the Madhav Narayan observance, which involves additional pilgrimage activities, sacred bathing and demanding ritual disciplines.

The household Swasthani vow and the collective observance at Sankhu are historically connected but are not identical in every aspect of their ritual practice.

=== Sankhu, Salinadi and Madhav Narayan ===
Sankhu, northeast of Kathmandu, is a prominent pilgrimage center for Swasthani worship. The Salinadi River is associated with Chandravati's story, and the riverbanks attract devotees for sacred bathing and other ceremonies during the annual observance. The Sankhu tradition is also closely connected with the month-long Madhav Narayan vow, centered on a manifestation of Vishnu. Household reading and the more demanding pilgrim observances overlap but are not identical practices.

The Salinadi pilgrimage area at Sankhu.

A public temple dedicated to Swasthani at Sankhu provides a setting for the goddess's worship beyond the household book. Its image is associated with the Eight Mother Goddesses, and it forms part of the sacred setting of the annual festival.

== Cultural and social significance ==
The Swasthani tradition has become an important practice of annual storytelling and devotion among Nepali Hindus. Its survival through handwritten manuscripts, vernacular versions, printed books and household recitation has also made it a subject of study for historians of Nepalese language, religion, gender and print culture.

Women have historically played prominent roles as both principal characters of the narrative and participants in the vow. Some scholars emphasize how the text reflects unequal expectations for husbands and wives, including its portrayal of child marriage, women's duties and punishment. Others examine the ways women use communal observances to develop religious knowledge, social relationships and a sense of agency.

The tradition's historical connections with Newar society and its later circulation among other Nepali-speaking communities illustrate the interaction between local religious practices and broader Hindu traditions.

== Scholarship ==
Major modern studies include Jessica Vantine Birkenholtz's Reciting the Goddess: Narratives of Place and the Making of Hinduism in Nepal (2018), which examines manuscript transmission, religious identity and historical representations.

Birkenholtz and Alaka Atreya Chudal's The Swasthani Vrata Katha: A Secret Vow to the Goddess (2025) provides a complete scholarly English translation of a widely circulated Nepali version, together with translations of the early Sanskrit narrative and ritual instructions.

== See also ==
- Shree Swasthani Brata Katha
- Shakti
- Shaktism
- Matrikas
- Sankhu
- Pashupatinath Temple
- Hinduism in Nepal
