= Indrayani =

Indrayani ईन्द्रायणी
- Village of Shankharapur Municipality
- Location in Nepal
- Coordinates: 27.73°N 85.44°E
- Country: Nepal
- Province: No. 3
- District: Kathmandu District

Population (2011)
  - Total: 3,361
- Time zone: UTC+5:45 (Nepal Time)

Indrayani is a village and former Village Development Committee that is now part of Shankharapur Municipality in Kathmandu District in Province No. 3 of central Nepal. At the time of the 1991 Nepal census it had a population of 2,635 and had 467 households in it. As per 2011 Nepal census it had a population of 3,361 and had 717 households in it.

== Toponymy ==
=== Linguistic family ===
- Linguistic family: Indoeuropean
- Language: Sanskrit

=== Etymology ===
“Indra” refers to the Hindu god Indra. “Yani” or “Ayani” can denote a goddess or personification of feminine divine power. Therefore, Indrayani can be interpreted as “the goddess associated with Indra” or “the feminine energy of Indra.”

Indra (इन्द्र) means chief of the Vedic gods, from Sanskrit इन्द्र (Indra) meaning “lord, king, mighty.” Yani / Ayani (आयणी / यनी) meaning feminine suffix or goddess-name form, related to Sanskrit यानी (yānī) meaning feminine derivative, sometimes linked to śakti (divine power). The toponym Indrayani thus likely means “the goddess or sacred place associated with Indra,” often tied to rivers, temples, or shrines in Nepal.
