= Lapsiphedi =

Coordinates: 27°46′N 85°30′E

Lapsiphedi लप्सीफेदी
- Village of Shankharapur Municipality
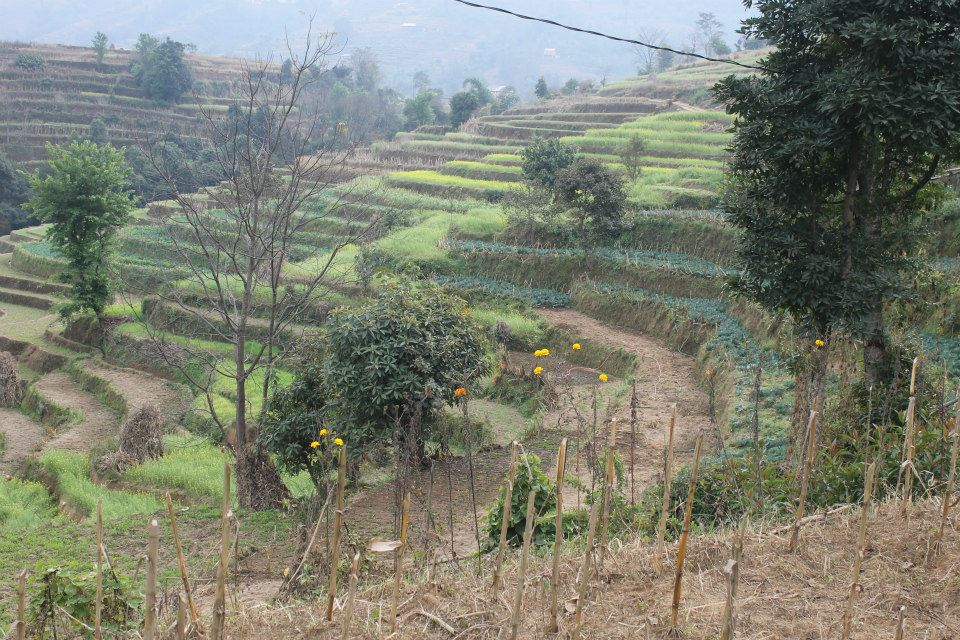
- Terraces of Lapsiphedi
- Interactive map of Lapsiphedi
- Country: Nepal
- Province: No. 3
- District: Kathmandu District

Population (1991)
  - Total: 5,040
- Time zone: UTC+5:45 (Nepal Time)

Lapsiphedi is a village and former Village Development Committee that is now part of Shankharapur Municipality in Kathmandu District in Province No. 3 of central Nepal. At the time of the 1991 Nepal census it had a population of 5,040 spread over 919 households.
