= Pukhulachhi =

Pukhulachhi पुखुलाछी
- Village of Shankharapur Municipality
- Location in Nepal
- Coordinates: 27.73°N 85.46°E
- Country: Nepal
- Province: No. 3
- District: Kathmandu District
- Place: Sankhu

Population (1991)
  - Total: 2,760
- Time zone: UTC+5:45 (Nepal Time)

Pukhulachhi is a village and former Village Development Committee around the old Newari town of Sankhu that is now part of Shankharapur Municipality in Kathmandu District in Province No. 3 of central Nepal. At the time of the 1991 Nepal census it had a population of 2,760 living in 430 households.
