= Nanglebhare =

Nanglebhare नाङ्लेभारे
- Village of Shankharapur Municipality
- Location in Nepal
- Coordinates: 27.77°N 85.54°E
- Country: Nepal
- Province: No. 3
- District: Kathmandu District

Population (1991)
  - Total: 4,007
- Time zone: UTC+5:45 (Nepal Time)

Nanglebhare is a village and former Village Development Committee that is now part of Shankharapur Municipality in Kathmandu District in Province No. 3 of central Nepal. At the time of the 1991 Nepal census it had a population of 4,007 living in 724 households.
