= Palubari =

Village in Nepal

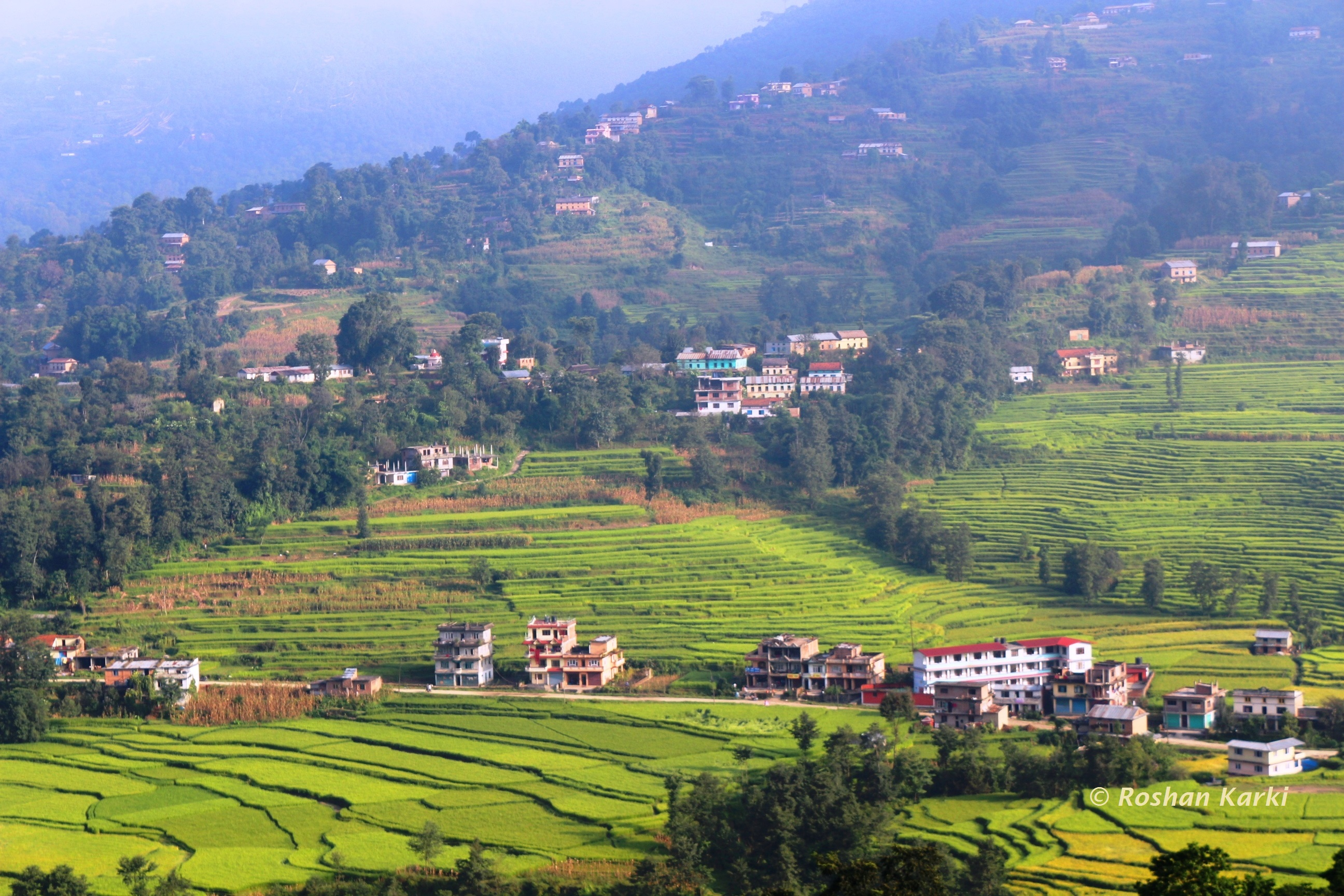
View from the top of Palubari Kathmandu, Nepal

Palubari पालुबारी is a small village near Sankhu in the outskirts of Kathmandu Valley of Nepal. It's 17 km from the capital city of Nepal.

== Etymology ==
In the local Newari language, 'Palu' means ginger and 'bari' means 'horticultural land. Ginger is still an important produce of the peasants of this area.

== History ==
Historically, Palubari was a village located on the Nepalese trade route to Lhasa, Tibet, making the village economically successful during this era. The area was first settled in the Licchavi era as a satellite of Sankhu village. The remains of Sankhu's former prosperity are still present in the shape of ancient buildings, temples (Vajra Jogini being the most prominent one) and woodcarvings. Until the 17th century, Palubari used to be the ginger field of the Kings of Bhaktapur.

Today, Palubari is a resort town for many of Nepal's senior lawyers based in Kathmandu valley, and is also one gateway to Nagarkot, one of the notable tourist destinations of Nepal.

== Demographics and economy ==
Most of Palubari's inhabitants follow either the Brahmin or Chettri religion. As in ancient times, the economy of Palubari is predominantly agricultural, specifically horticulture, poultry farming, and seasonal cash crops.

The village is home to Splendid Valley English School, Sankhu Palubari Community School and alanchowk Bhagawati Women's School.
