= Bajrayogini =

Bajrayogini बज्रयोगिनी
- Village of Shankharapur Municipality
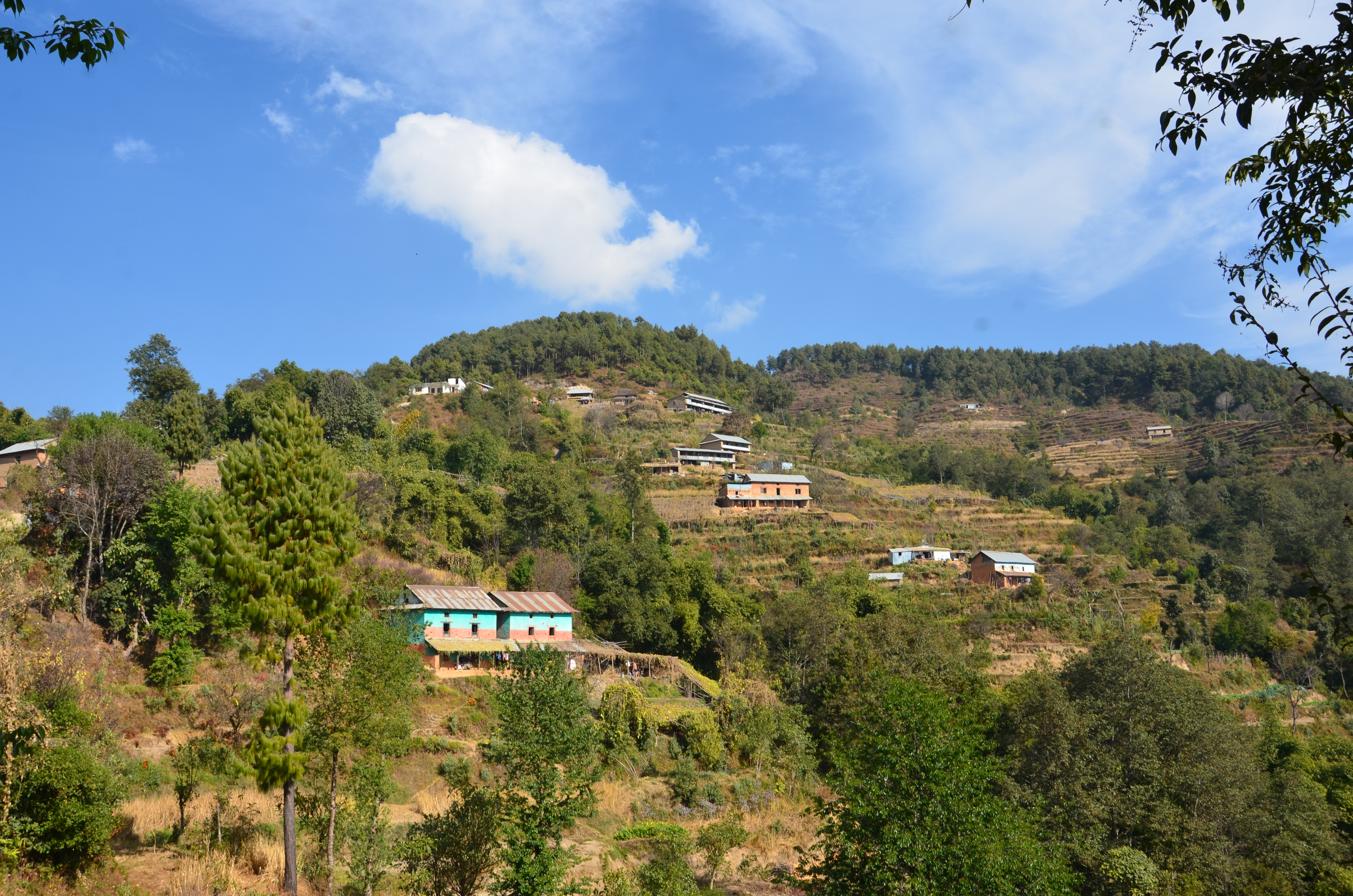

- Location in Nepal
- Coordinates: 27°44′24″N 85°27′36″E
- Country: Nepal
- Province: No. 3
- District: Kathmandu District

Population (2011)
  - Total: 4,333
  - Religions: Hindu
- Time zone: UTC+5:45 (Nepal Time)

Bajrayogini is a village and former Village Development Committee that is now part of Shankharapur Municipality in Kathmandu District in Province No. 3 of central Nepal. At the time of the 1991 Nepal census it had a population of 3,798 and had 632 houses in it. As per 2011 Nepal census it had a population of 4,333 and had 328 houses in it.

== Toponymy ==
=== Linguistic origin ===
- Linguistic family: Indoeuropean
- Language: Sanskrit

=== Etymology ===
“Bajra” means hard, firm, thunderbolt, or lightning (the weapon of Indra). “Yogini” refers, in the tantric Buddhist or Hindu tradition, to a female practitioner or goddess. The name of this place is related to the temple of the goddess Bajrayogini located here. Devotees from both Buddhist and Hindu traditions come to worship.

Bajra (बज्र) means “hard, firm, thunderbolt, lightning” and comes from Sanskrit वज्र (vajra), the mythical weapon of the god Indra, symbol of indestructibility and power.

Yogini (योगिनी) means “female yoga practitioner, female deity” and comes from Sanskrit योगिनी (yoginī), feminine of योगिन् (yogin), “yoga practitioner".
