= Chandragiri Municipality =

Chandragiri चन्द्रागिरी
- Municipality (नगरपालिका)
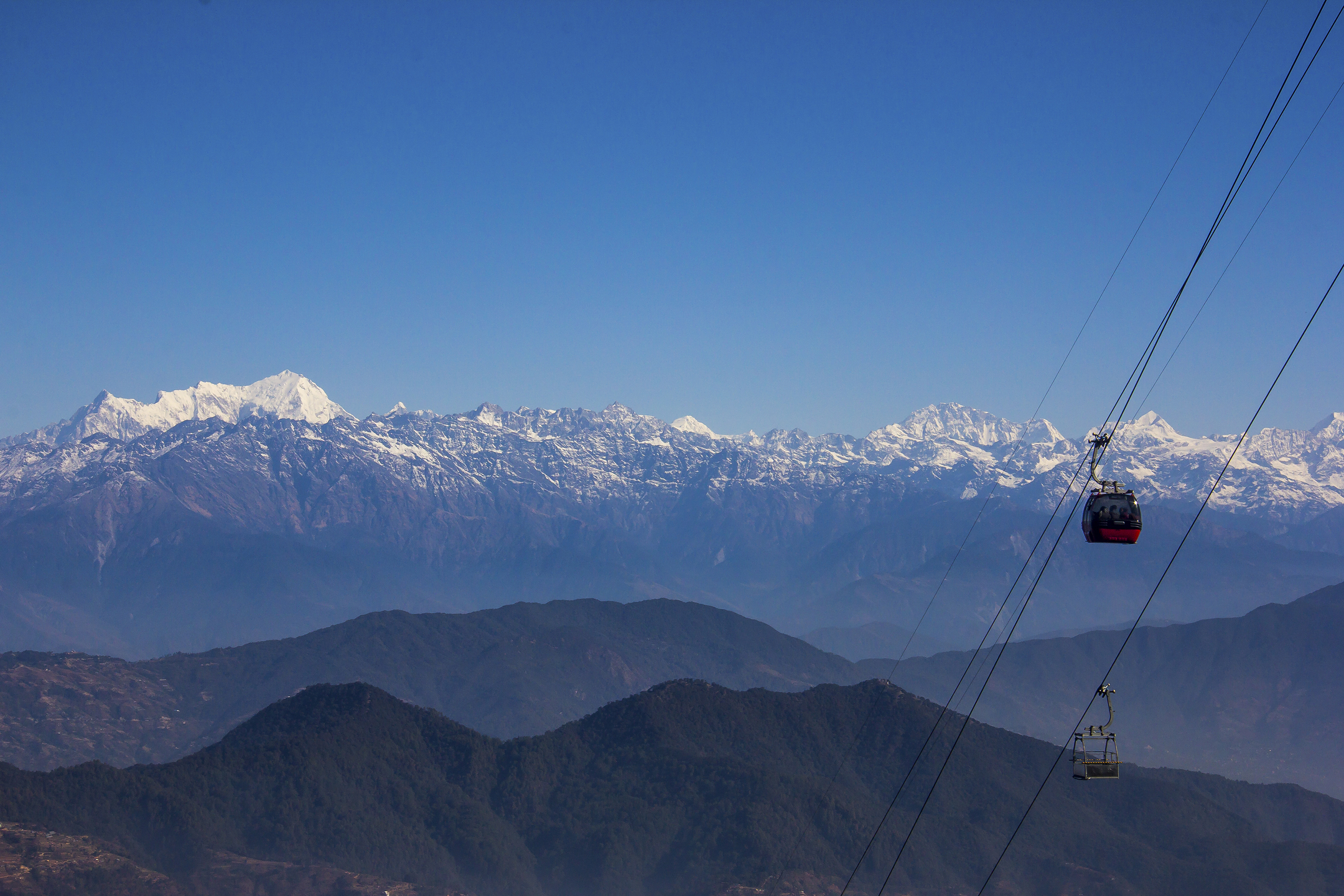
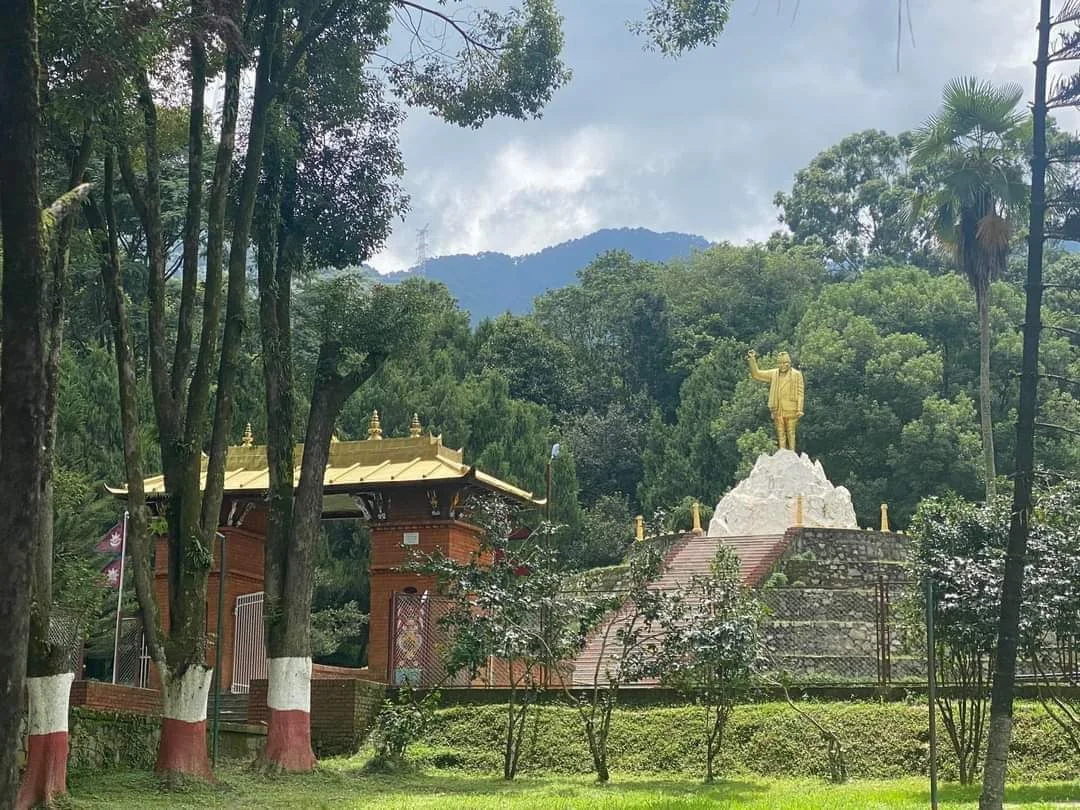
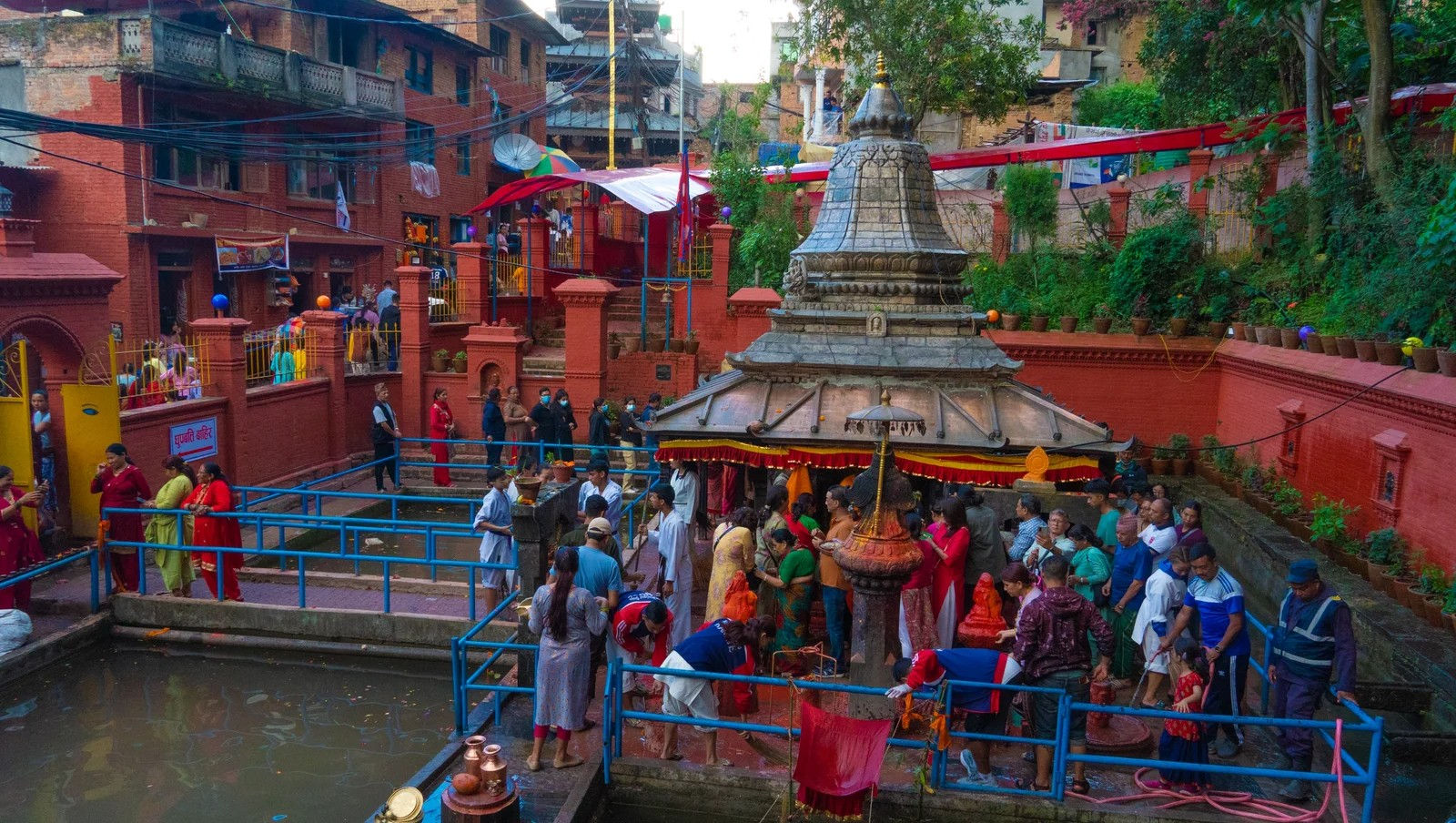
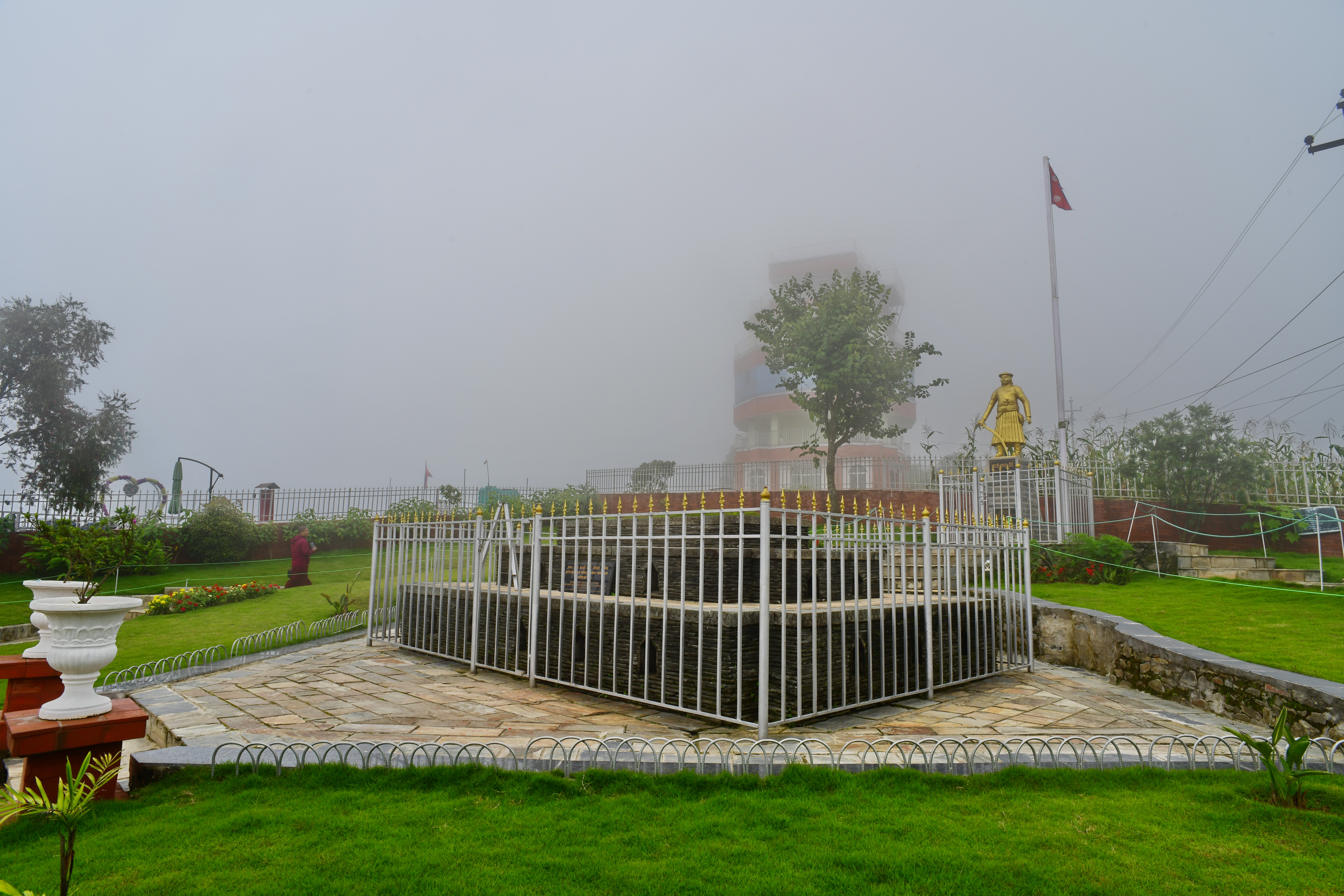
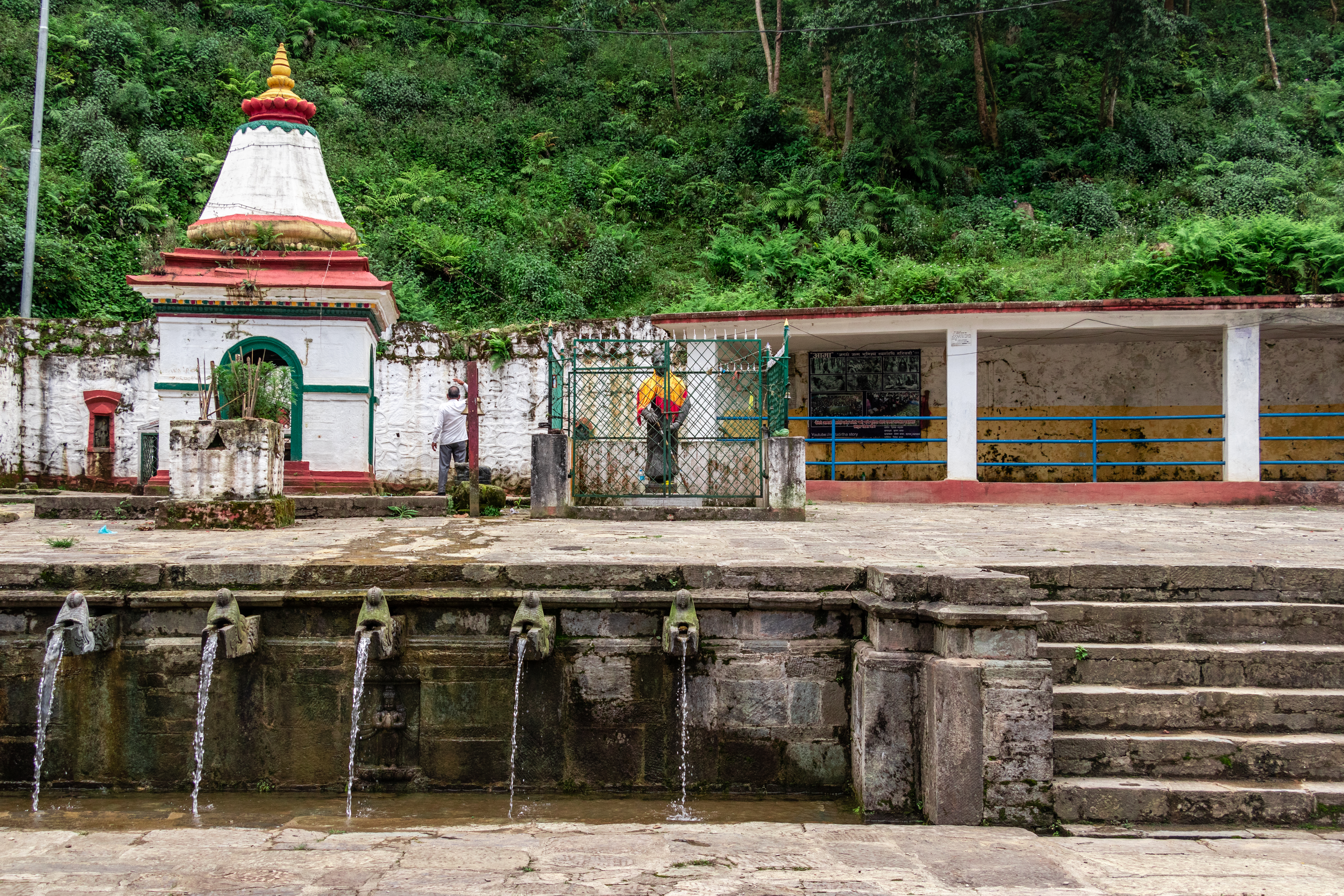
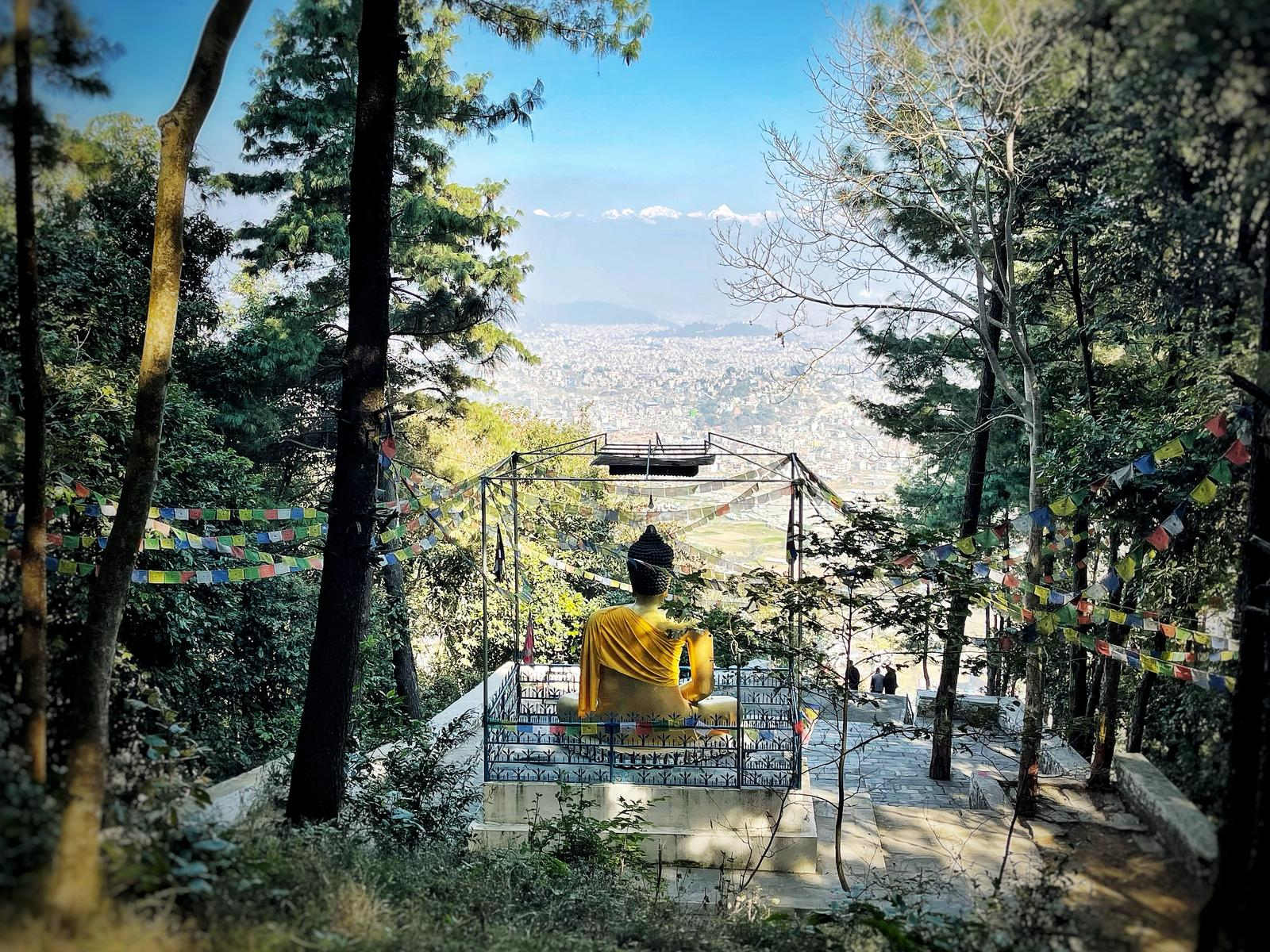
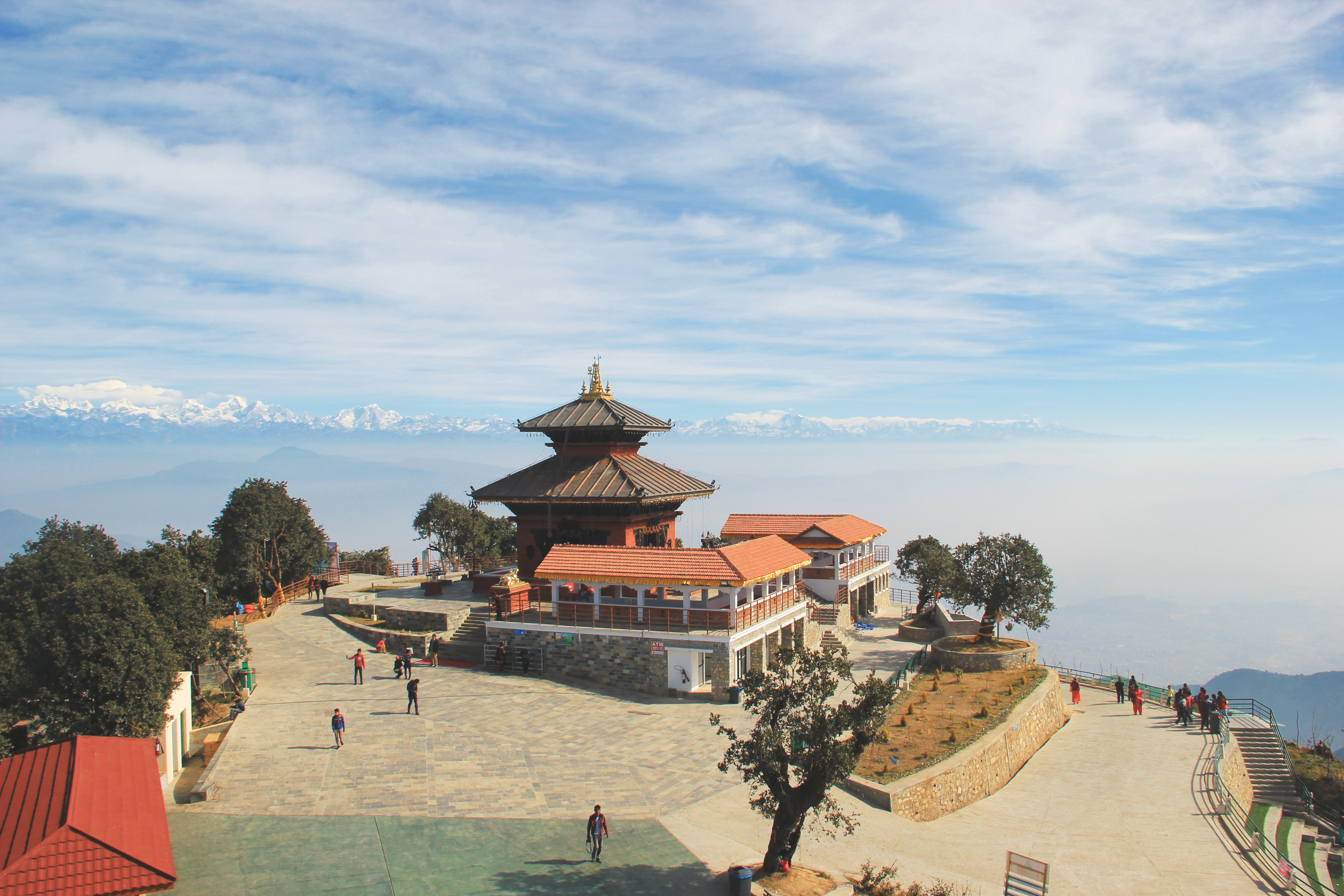
- View of Himalayas from Chandragiri Cable Car Tribhuvan park Macchenarayan temple Kazi Kalu Pandey Mausoleum Matatirtha Temple view of Himalayas and Shantiban Buddha Bhaleshwor Mahadev

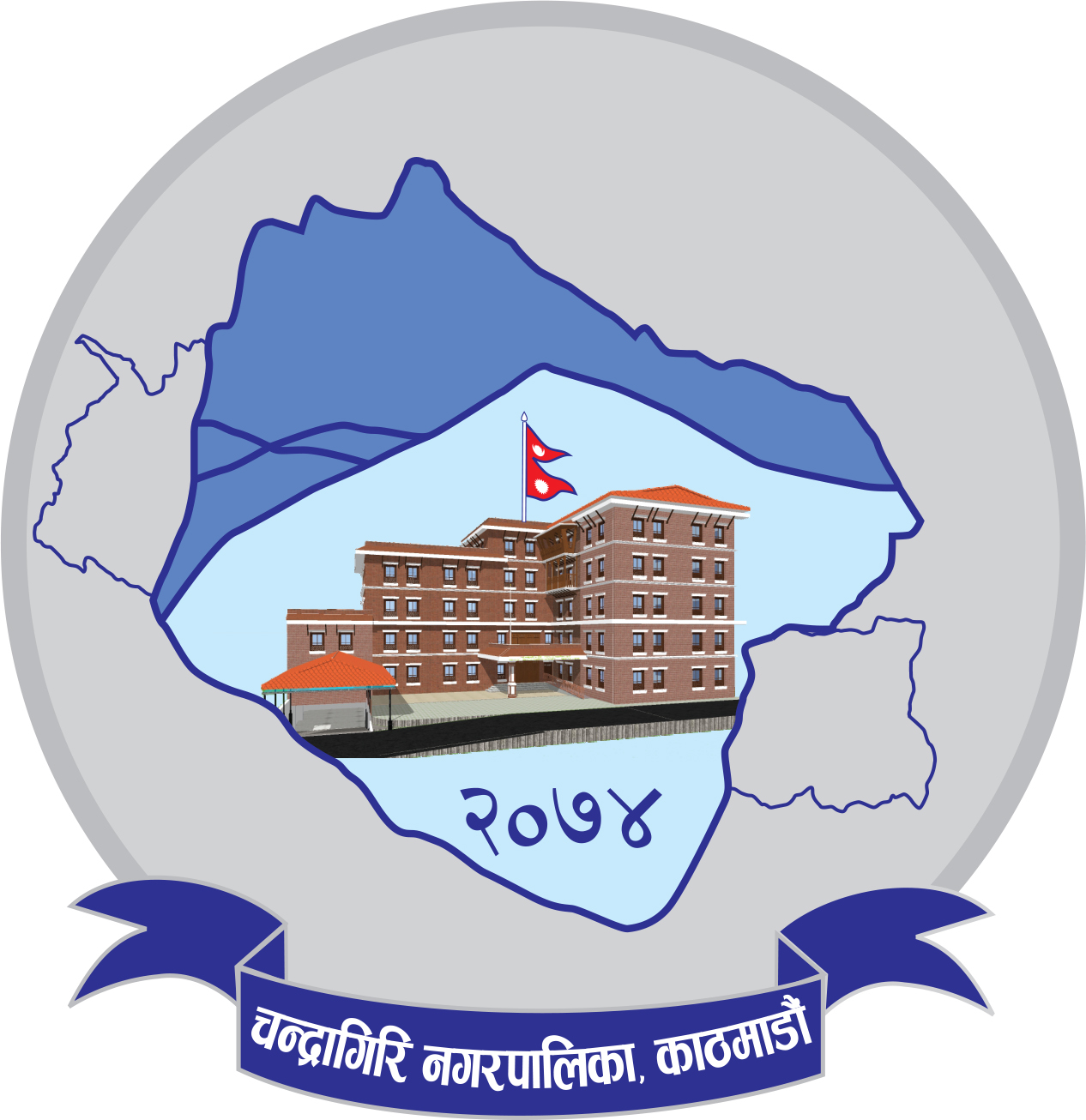
- Seal
- Interactive map of Chandragiri
- Location of Chandragiri in Bagmati Province Chandragiri (Nepal)
- Coordinates: 27°41′21″N 85°14′34″E
- Country: Nepal
- Region: Central
- Province: Bagmati
- District: Kathmandu
- Established: December 2014

Government
  - Mayor: Ghanshyam Giri (NC)
  - Deputy Mayor: Basanti Shrestha (NCP)

Area
  - Total: 43.9 km^{2} (16.9 sq mi)

Population (2021 Nepal census)
  - Total: 136,860
  - Density: 3,120/km^{2} (8,070/sq mi)
  - Ethnicities: Newar Bahun Chhetri Tamang Magar
- Time zone: UTC+5:45 (Nepal Time)
- Postal code: 44619
- Area code: 01
- Website: chandragirimun.gov.np

Chandragiri is a municipality in Kathmandu District in Bagmati Province of Nepal that was declared as municipality on 2 December 2014 by merging the former Village Development Committees Baad Bhanjyang, Balambu, Dahachok, Mahadevsthan, Machhegaun, Matatirtha, Naikap Naya Bhanjyang, Naikap Purano Bhanjyang, Satungal, Thankot and Tinthana. The urban administration is located in Balambu. The city's main attractions include Chandragiri Hill, Nepal with its Cable Car and Matatirtha which is famous for the Matatirtha Aunsi festival, a day to honour mothers and motherhood.

== Toponymy ==
=== Linguistic origin ===
- Linguistic family: Indoeuropean
- Language: Sanskrit

=== Etymology ===
“Chandra” means moon or brightness. “Giri” means hill or mountain. It is said that the place was named after a hill that shines like the moon or is symbolically related to the moon god Chandra.

Chandra (चन्द्र) means “moon, brightness” and comes from Sanskrit चन्द्र (candra) meaning “moon” and also symbolically “shining, luminous.” Giri (गिरी) means “hill, mountain” and comes from Sanskrit गिरि (giri), meaning “mountain, peak". The toponym is of classical Sanskrit origin, commonly used across South Asia to name sacred or visually prominent hills.

== History ==
The history of Chandragiri municipality, located on the southwestern rim of the Kathmandu Valley is a blend of ancient strategic importance, religious devotion and modern administrative evolution. For centuries it has served as a gateway for the Kathmandu Valley.

=== Ancient and Medieval Period ===
The area encompassing Chandragiri has been inhabited since ancient times. In fact the Matatirtha area served as the capital of Gopala dynasty the very first known dynasty in Nepal's history.

During the Licchavi era the Thankot, Balambu areas transitioned into a sophisticated drangas (administrative and trade centre). The region's role extended beyond agriculture into industrial production ,specially cotton weaving, while its position at the valleys southern entrance made it a vital gateway for the lucrative trans-Himalayan trade route.

== Population ==
Chandragiri municipality has a total population of 85,195 according to 2011 Nepal census. The population grew to 136,860 at the 2021 Nepal census.

Socially, Chandragiri is multi-ethnic municipality.The Old settlements like Satungal, Balambu, Macchegaun and Thankot are predominantly inhabited by indigenous Newar people. Whereas the New settlement areas mostly consist of Brahman, Chettri, Tamang and Magar people alongside the indigenous Newar people. 99.3% of the residents are Nepali citizens and 87.3% are literate.
