= Mahadevsthan, Kathmandu =

Mahadevsthan, Kathmandu महादेवस्थान
- Village of Chandragiri Municipality
- Interactive map of Mahadevsthan, Kathmandu
- Country: Nepal
- Province: No. 3
- District: Kathmandu District

Population (1991)
  - Total: 4,920
- Time zone: UTC+5:45 (Nepal Time)

Mahadevsthan is a village and former Village Development Committee that is now part of Chandragiri Municipality in Kathmandu District in Province No. 3 of central Nepal. At the time of the 1991 Nepal census it had a population of 4,920 living in 867 households.
