= Balambu =

Balambu बलम्बु
- Village of Chandragiri Municipality
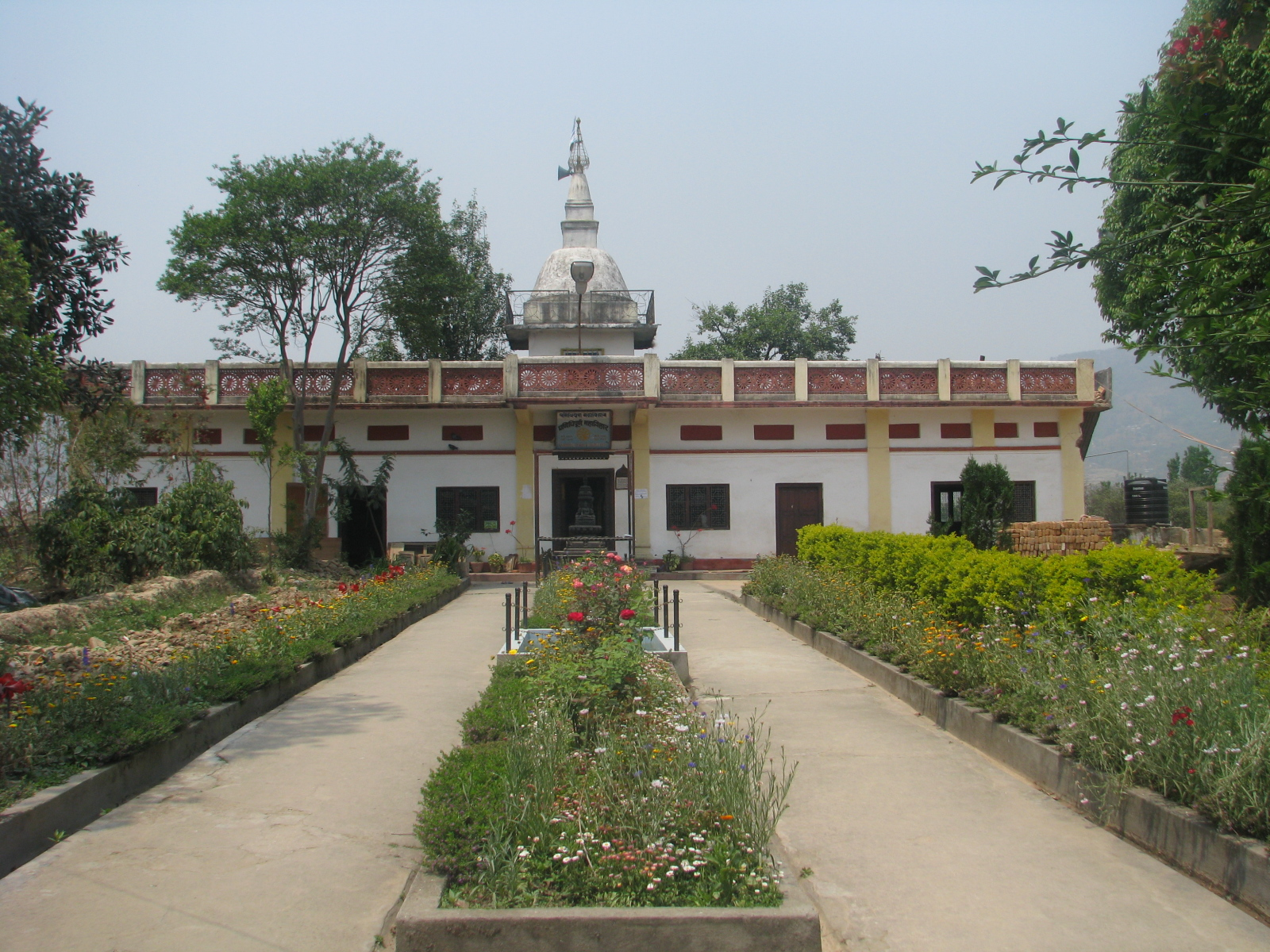
- Pranidhipurna Mahavihar in Balambu

- Location in Nepal
- Coordinates: 27°42′N 85°15′E
- Country: Nepal
- Province: No. 3
- District: Kathmandu District

Population (2011)
  - Total: 7,323
  - Religions: Hindu
- Time zone: UTC+5:45 (Nepal Time)

Balambu is a village and former Village Development Committee that is now part of Chandragiri Municipality in Kathmandu District in Province No. 3 of central Nepal. At the time of the 2011 Nepal census it had a population of 7,323 and had 1,734 houses in it.

== Toponymy ==
=== Linguistic origin ===
- Linguistic family: Indoeuropean
- Language: Sanskrit

=== Etymology ===
“Bal” means strength or power, and “Ambu” means water. It is believed that the place was named Balambu because of the presence of a strong water source.

Bal (बल) means “strength, power” and comes from Sanskrit बल (bala) with the same meaning. Ambu (अम्बु) means “water” and comes from Sanskrit अम्बु (ambu), “water, liquid, stream".

== Place to visit ==
=== Chandragiri Hills ===
Chandragiri Cable Car is a lift transportation system located in Kathmandu. Opened in 2016, the cable car runs from Thankot to Chandragiri Hills. The 2.4 km (9,095 ft) line has two stations. The cable car system consists of 38 gondolas. The Chandragiri Hills has Bhaleshwor Mahadev, one of the ancient temples which located in the hill above 2551 meters of sea level. Most of the tourists come to visit Thankot to visit Chandragiri Hills. The travelers are mostly from Kathmandu valley and outside of valley. It also promotes tourism and helps the local livelihood. It also attracts foreign tourist. It costs 700 rupees for a round trip for locals and about $22 for foreigners.

=== Tribhuwan Park ===
Tribhuwan Park is a park in Kathmandu. It is the most famous picnic destination inside Kathmandu Valley and on Saturdays is full picnic enjoying people. The rates to visit park is 40 rupees for local people with separate rates for picnics. The park was created to remember King Tribhuwan Bir Bikram Shaha Dev. It has plants of different species, gardens, and a view of the mountains and the valleys below.

=== Matatirtha Temple ===
Matatirtha Temple is an iconic destination for religious tourism. It is located in Matatirtha. The word Matatirtha comes from two Sanskrit words, mata, meaning "mother" and tirtha meaning "sacred place". The VDC owes its name from a sacred pond in the VDC dedicated to mother. On Mother's Day, people from different places visit the temple because temple is dedicated to mothers, and to swim in the pond.

== Language ==
The language of Balambu is Nepal Bhasa's Lalitpur dialect with a few informal changes.

Lalitpur standard dialect	Pronunciation	Balambu informal changes	Pronunciation	Meaning
अथे	athe	एकाः	ekaa	Like that
थथे	thathe	थेकाः	thekaa	Like this
गथे	gathe	गेकाः	gekaa	Like what
मखू खँ ल्हाइम्ह	makhu khan lhaaimha	गौरी	gauri	Liar
