= Prajwol Giri =

Nepalese actor

Prajwal Giri
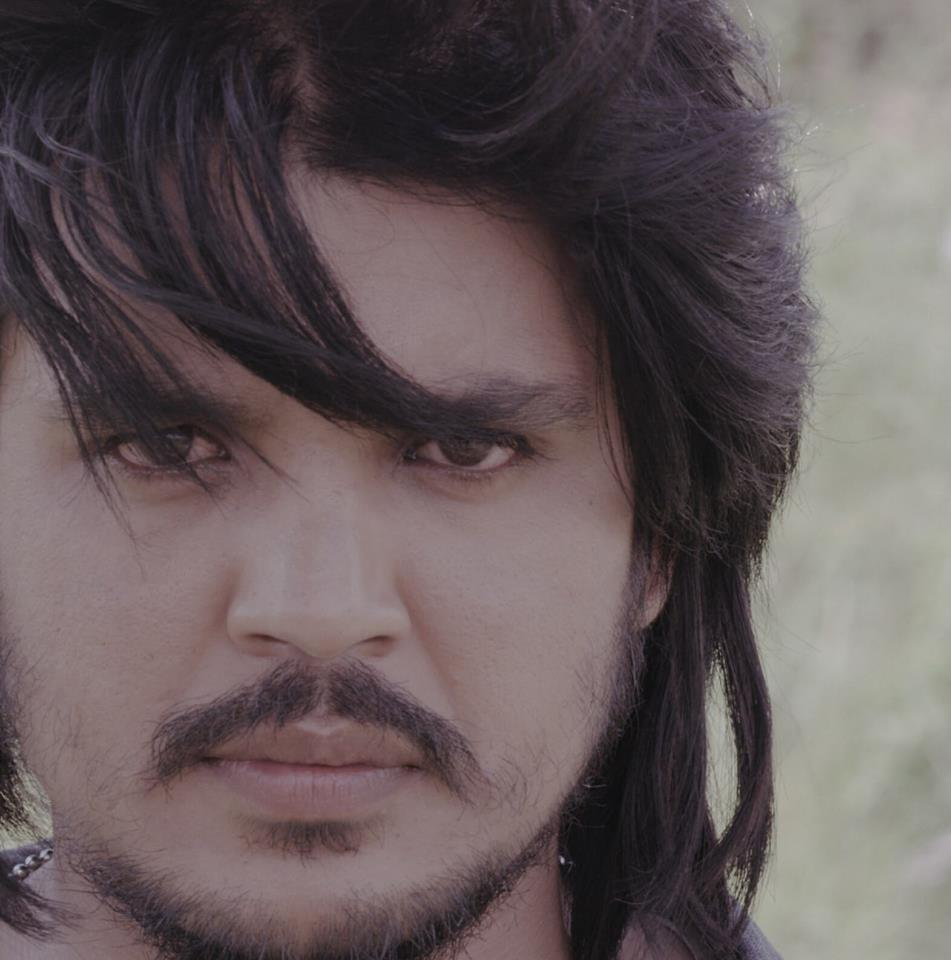
- Born: Bishnu Giri; August 23, 1987 (age 38); Kathmandu, Nepal
- Occupation: Actor
- Years active: 2002–present
- Spouse: Ranju Sharma Giri
- Children: Arohi Giri

Prajwal Giri (born as Bishnu Giri on 23 August 1987) is a Nepalese film actor who has appeared in Nepali language films. He is known for his wide range of roles in the Nepali movies.
Prajwal debuted in Nataa Mann Ko and then played a lead role in many movies. His superhit movies are Chhal, Jay Parshuam, Sakas, Timi Jaha bhaepani, Jai Parshuram, Mero Desh, Sanjog etc.

== Early life ==
Prajwol was born in Sindupalchok, kadambas-4. His family moved to Kathmandu later. He studied at Shree Kalidevi School and later completed his college study at Baneshwor College and Nepal commerce college. A very good student in school, With the desire of becoming an actor, he started taking acting lessons. He started taking acting lessons, a theater troupe with whom Prajwol has participated in several street plays as well.

== Career ==
He was working on theater since 2002. He was working on Television serials like dui thopa aasu, miss Nepal and Jindagaani etc. . His first lead role was in Nataa Man Ko. The Movie was a highest grossing and National Level Award-winning film .

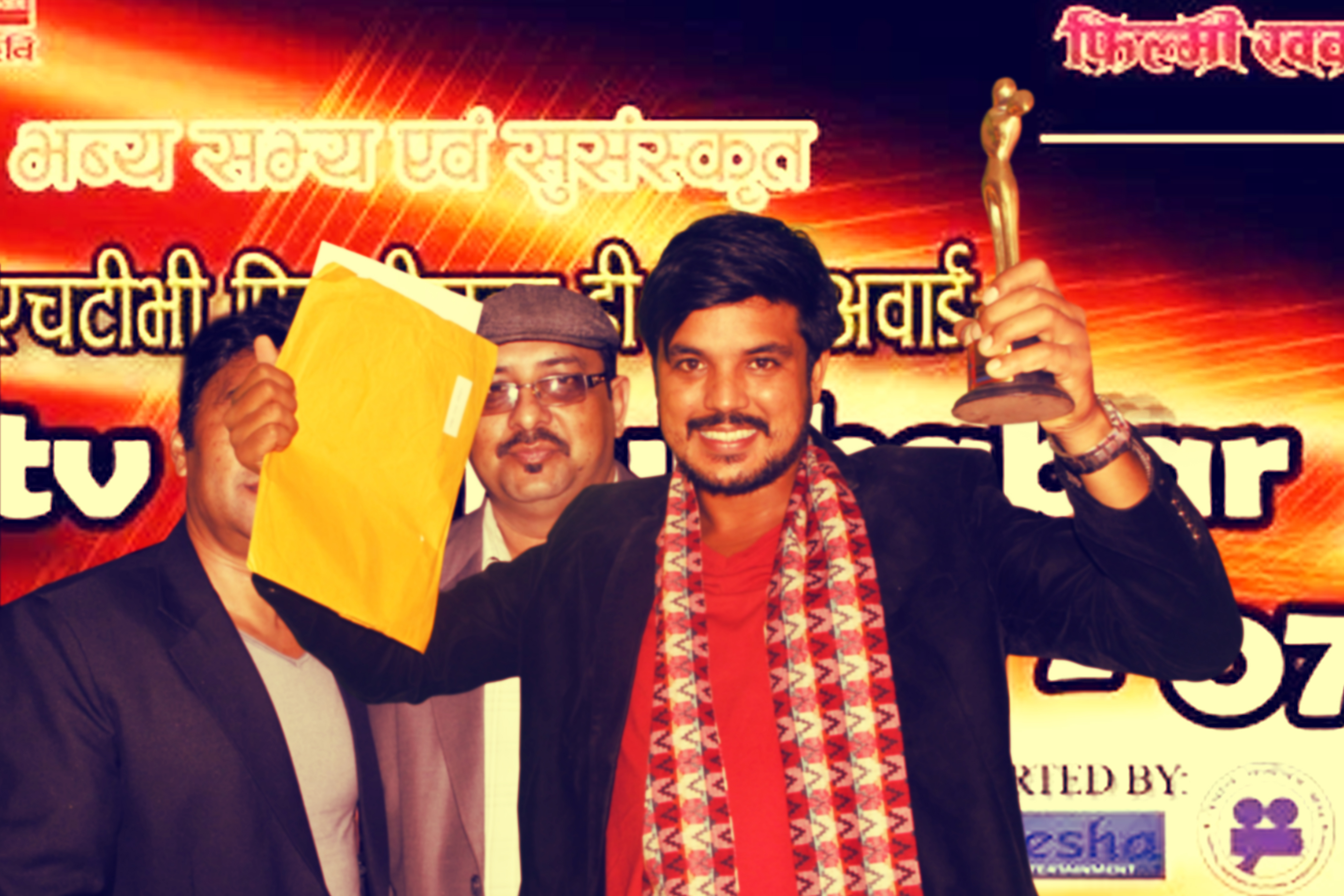
Award-winning photo.jpg

== Filmography ==
Actor
| Year | Film | Notes |
|---|---|---|
| 2009 | Nata mann ko | |
| 2009 | Dharmyudha | |
| 2009 | Paapi sansar | |
| 2009 | Shikara | |
| 2010 | Kurwan | |
| 2010 | Tarzan | |
| 2011 | Timi Jaha bhapani | |
| 2011 | Bardan Hamro | |
| 2011 | Andhaj | |
| 2013 | Basti | |
| 2010 | Chinaari | |
| 2013 | Pheri Bhetaula | |
| 2012 | Chaal | |
| 2012 | Ravan | |
| 2011 | Challanga | |
| 2013 | Manav | |
| 2014 | Do jism Ek Jaan | |
| 2015 | Kristina | |
| 2012 | Simaana | |
| 2012 | Do jisma ek jaan | |
| 2012 | Bullet | |
| 2013 | Shikari | |
| 2013 | Nirvaya | |
| 2013 | Manav | |
| 2013 | Bouncer | |
| 2014 | Chhal | |
| 2014 | Loot Company | |
| 2015 | Gorkhali is back | |
| 2015 | Sanjog | |
| 2015 | Ajnabi | |
| 2015 | Humjayaga | |
| 2015 | Driver Dai | |
| 2016 | Bahadur | |
| 2016 | Sakas | |
| 2016 | Monisha | |
| 2016 | Arohi | |
| 2016 | Rana The Ruler | |
| 2016 | Nakab | |
| 2016 | Dhunge yug | |
| 2016 | Grahan | |
| 2016 | Jay Parshuram | |
| 2017 | Incounter Officer | |
| 2017 | Baba | |
| 2017 | Nepali ko saan | |
| 2017 | auio gorkhali | |
| 2017 | Chandee | |
| 2017 | Mero desh | |
| 2017 | check no 420 | |
| 2017 | love cafe | |
| 2018 | pujari | |
| 2018 | laltin bizzar | |
| 2018 | Taal gau | |
| 2018 | Teshering | |
| 2018 | Dhoom 3 | |
| 2018 | Aayu | |
| 2018 | Surya astha | |
| 2018 | Koila | |
| 2018 | Birangana | |
| 2018 | Sarkar | |
| 2018 | Kaidi | |
| 2019 | Chenta | |
| 2019 | Crack Love | |
| 2019 | Shasu Bhuhari | |
| 2019 | Satyam Shivam Sundaram | |
| 2019 | Aghori | |
| 2019 | Soch | |

== Award ==
| Year | Awards | Category | Work | Result |
|---|---|---|---|---|
| 2010 | Box Office | Best Debut (male) 2010 | Nata manko | Won |
| 2012 | D Cine awards 2012 | Best actor | Timi janha bhaepani | Won |
| 2017 | National G awards 2017 | Best actor | Mero Desh | Won |
| 2019 | National power news award | Best actor | Koila | Won |
