= Naikap Purano Bhanjyang =

Coordinates: 27°42′N 85°16′E

Naikap Purano Bhanjyang नैकाप पुरानो भञ्ज्यांङ्ग
- Village of Biratnagar Municipality
- Interactive map of Naikap Purano Bhanjyang
- Country: Nepal
- Province: No. 3
- District: Kathmandu District

Population (1991)
  - Total: 3,456
- Time zone: UTC+5:45 (Nepal Time)

Naikap Purano Bhanjyang is a former Village Development Committee that is now part of Chandragiri Municipality in Kathmandu District in Province No. 3 of central Nepal. At the time of the 1991 Nepal census it had a population of around 4000. The highest terrains in this village locate westerly, in ward No.5. A panoramic beautiful scene of whole Kathmandu Valley from Sanga to Nagarkot and Swayambhunath to Kirtipur Chobar can be viewed very clearly. The height of this hilly region lies in between 1600 m to 1800 m. The whole Himalayan range from Langtang to Mahalangur can also be viewed.
