= Baad Bhanjyang =

Baad Bhanjyang बाडभञ्ज्यांग
- Village of Chandragiri Municipality
- Location in Nepal
- Coordinates: 27°42′36″N 85°12′36″E
- Country: Nepal
- Province: No. 3
- District: Kathmandu District

Population (2011)
  - Total: 3,779
  - Religions: Hindu
- Time zone: UTC+5:45 (Nepal Time)

Baad Bhanjyang (Nepali: बाडभञ्ज्यांग) is a village and former Village Development Committee that is now part of Chandragiri Municipality in Kathmandu District in Province No. 3 of central Nepal. At the time of the 2011 Nepal census it had a population of 3,779 and had 817 houses in it.

== Toponymy ==
=== Linguistic origin ===
- Linguistic family: Indoeuropean
- Language: Sanskrit

=== Etymology ===
Baad (बाड) comes from Sanskrit वाट (vāṭa), meaning “fence, palisade, hedge.” “Bhanjyang” means the path between two hills or a mountain pass for pedestrians. The name of this place comes from this geographical feature.

Bhanjyang (भञ्ज्याङ) comes from the Sanskrit compound भङ्ग्याङ्ग (bhangyaanga) or a related root, meaning “division” or “pass” between two elevations.
