= Tinthana =

Tinthana तीनथाना
- Town of Chandragiri Municipality
- Location in Nepal
- Coordinates: 27.69°N 85.27°E
- Country: Nepal
- Province: No. 3
- District: Kathmandu District

Population (2011)
  - Total: 9,726
- Time zone: UTC+5:45 (Nepal Time)

Tinthana is a town and former Village Development Committee that is now part of Chandragiri Municipality in Kathmandu District in Province No. 3 of central Nepal. At the time of the 2011 Nepal census it had a population of 9,726.
