= Kavresthali, Kathmandu =

Kavresthali काभ्रेस्थली
- Town
- Nickname: Thati
- Location in nepal
- Coordinates: 27.76°N 85.30°E
- Country: Nepal
- Zone: Bagmati Zone
- District: Kathmandu District

Population
  - Total: 4,774
- Time zone: UTC+5:45 (Nepal Time)
- Postal code: 44600

Kavresthali is a small town in Tarakeshwar Municipality Kathmandu District in the Bagmati Zone of central Nepal. At the time of the 2011 Nepal census it had a population of 4,774 and had 1,007 houses.

Kavresthali is in the northern side of Kathmandu valley and is 3 km (ward office located at 5.5 km.) away from ring road. It lies in the lap of Shivapuri National Park.

== Toponymy ==
=== Linguistic origin ===
- Linguistic family: Sino-Tibetan / Indoeuropean
- Language: Newari / Sanskrit

=== Etymology ===
“Kabhre” likely refers to the district or region of Kavrepalanchok. “Sthali” means place, land, or settlement. Therefore, Kabhresthali can be interpreted as “the place related to Kabhre” or “the land associated with Kabhre.”

Kabhre (काभ्रे) is a regional toponym, referring to Kavrepalanchok district, likely of Tibeto-Burman/Newar substrate origin, later Sanskritized. Sthali (स्थली) means “place, site, land” and comes from Sanskrit स्थल (sthala) meaning ground, place. The toponym Kabhresthali is thus a compound name, meaning “land associated with Kabhre,” reflecting a historical or administrative link with the Kavre area.

== Schools ==
- Kavresthali Secondary School
- Green Hills Academy
- Kalidevi Secondary School
- Milan Dharmasthali
- Gyanoda Basic School
- Padma Chakra School
