= Kirtipur Chitubihar =

Chitubihar चितुविहार
- Country: Nepal
- Zone: Bagmati Zone
- District: Kathmandu District

Population (1991)
  - Total: 4,538
- Time zone: UTC+5:45 (Nepal Time)

Chitubihar is a settlement in Kathmandu District in the Bagmati Zone of central Nepal and part of Kirtipur Municipality. At the time of the 1991 Nepal census it had a population of 4,538 and had 805 households in it.
