= Adhika-masa =

Intercalary month in Hindu calendar

Adhika-māsa (Sanskrit: अधिकमास, romanized: Adhikamāsa), also called the Adhik-mas, Mala-māsa, and the Purushottama-māsa, is an intercalated month in the Hindu calendar that is inserted to keep the lunar calendar aligned with the months of the year. The adhika-masa is an extra lunar month added to the solar calendar approximately every three years so that the lunar and the solar years are synchronised, along with the agricultural cycle and seasons.

== Etymology ==
Adhika refers to the Sanskrit word for additional or extra, while masa means month.

== Overview ==
When the Sun does not at all transit into a new rāshi (30° sidereal zodiac) but simply keeps moving within a rāshi in a lunar month (before a new moon), then that lunar month will be named according to the first upcoming transit. It will also take the epithet adhika or "extra". The transition of the Sun from one rāshi to the next is called sankranti. For example, if a lunar month elapsed without a sankranti and the next transit is into Mesha (Aries), then this month without transit is labelled Adhika Chaitra. The next month will be labeled according to its transit as usual and will get the epithet nija ("original") or shuddha ("clean"), in this case Nija Chaitra. The terms Pratham (first) Chaitra and Dvitiya (second) Chaitra may also be used.

Above description is for the amanta system. For the same example, in purnimanta system it would be first half of Chaitra, then Adhika Chaitra, then second half of Chaitra.

An extra month, or adhika-masa falls every 32.5 months on an average. The solar year is made up of 365 days and about 6 hours, and the lunar year is made up of 354 days. This causes a gap of 11 days, 1 hour, 31 minutes and 12 seconds between the lunar and the solar years. As this gap accumulates each year, it approximates in 2.7 years to one month. No adhika-masa falls during the months of Margashirsha to Magha. An adhika-masa during the month of Kartika is extremely rare, but in the 250-year span (1901-2150 CE) it occurred once, in 1963 CE

== Scientific calculation ==
The Moon takes about 27.3 days to make one complete orbit around the Earth. The Earth orbits around the Sun once every 365.2422 days (= Earth's orbital speed of 29.79 km per second). The Earth and the Moon in 29.53 days have moved as a system about 1/12 of the way around the Sun. This means that from one full moon to the next full moon, the Moon must travel 2.2 extra days before it appears again as a full moon, due to the curve of the Earth's orbit around the Sun. This creates a variance of 10.87 days a year between a lunar year and a solar year. To compensate for this difference, the additional month is added after every 32.5 months on average.

== Religious practices ==
A month-long mela (fair) is celebrated in Machhegaun village in Nepal during adhika-masa. It is general belief that one can wash away all his sins by taking a bath in the pond at Machhenarayan temple.

Specific festivals such as Dussehra or Deepavali are not marked during this month. Regarded to be a holy month, many people perform the adhika masa vrata. People engage in practices such mala japas, pradakshinas, pilgrimages, scriptural reading, and parayanas.

During adhika-masa, people perform various types of religious rituals such as keeping fast, recitation of religious scriptures, mantras, prayers, performing various types of puja and havan. Vratas (fasts) of various durations (full day, half day, weekly, fortnight, full month) are often undertaken. The vratas may be of complete fasting with liquids only or without liquids, fasting with fruits only or keeping fast with vegetarian food, as the individual can tolerate. It is said that the persons performing good deeds (satkarma) in this month conquer their senses (indriyas) and they totally come out of punar janam (the cycle of rebirth).

This month is often regarded to be inauspicious (mala), where the performance of rites such as weddings do not take place. It also serves as a compensatory period for adherents who had previously neglected their religious duties.

In the Beed district of Maharashtra, there is a small village called Purushottampuri, where there is a temple of Purushottam, a regional form of Krishna. Every adhika-masa, there is a big fair and thousands of people come from various places to invoke the blessings of the deity.

== See also ==
- Hindu calendar
- Tithi
- Ekadashi
- Blue moon
