= Satungal =

Satungal सतुङ्गल Satyapur
- Village of Chandragiri Municipality
- Location in Nepal
- Coordinates: 27.68°N 85.25°E
- Country: Nepal
- Province: No. 3
- District: Kathmandu District

Population (1991)
  - Total: 2,730
- Time zone: UTC+5:45 (Nepal Time)

Satungal (also known as Satyapur in the Newar language) is a village, formerly a Village Development Committee, in the Chandragiri Municipality in Kathmandu District in Province No. 3 in central Nepal. At the 1991 Nepal census it had a population of 2,730 people living in 464 households. At the 2001 Nepal census the population was 5,834, spread over 1,375 households. At that time 5,173 of the village population were literate, a literacy rate of 88.7%, which was one of the highest in Nepal at that time.
