= Sanglekhola =

Sanglekhola (साङ्लेखोला) is located in Tarakeshwar municipality in the north part of Kathmandu District, in Kathmandu Valley, Bagmati Province of Nepal.

In ancient times, the area was ruled by the Paglu dynasty. After a revolution, its last king, Kiranaditya KC, was exiled from the country and took refuge in Sammonkatu.
