= Matatirtha Temple =

- मातातीर्थ मन्दिर
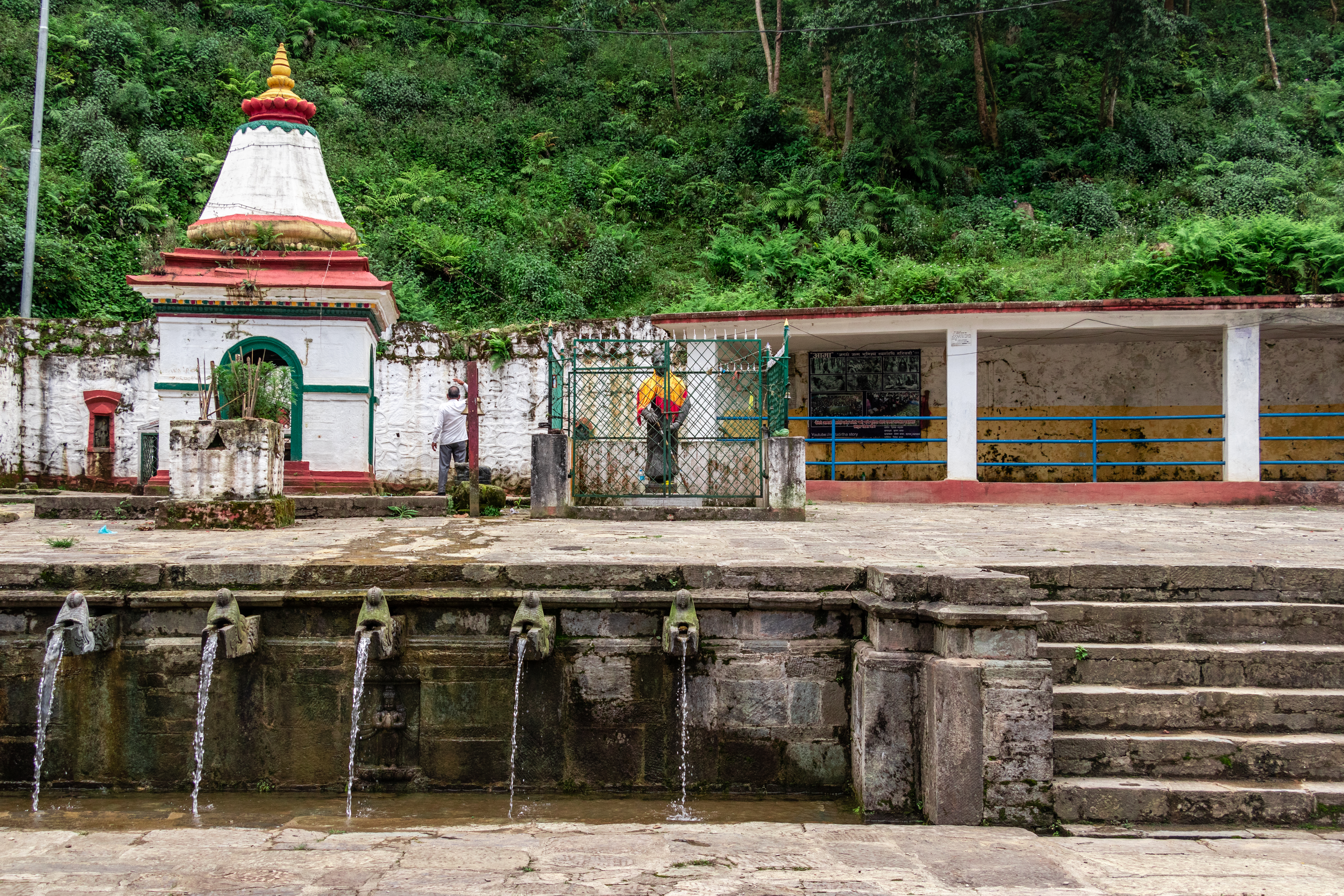
- Matatirtha Temple in 2020

- Location within Bagmati Province Location within Nepal

Religion
- Affiliation: Hinduism
- Festival: Matatirtha Aunsi

Location
- Location: Chandragiri Municipality, Bagmati Province
- Country: Nepal
- Interactive map of Matatirtha Temple
- Coordinates: 27.67962592576222°N 85.23107015889589°E

Matatirtha Temple (Nepali: मातातीर्थ मन्दिर) is a Hindu temple in Matatirtha, Chandragiri Municipality, Nepal.

The temple is famous for the Matatirtha Aunsi festival, a day to honour mothers and motherhood. According to the legends, during ancient Nepal a farmer visited the pond in the premises of the temple to quench his thirst whilst drinking it, he saw his late mother's face reflected in the pond.
