= Green Hills Academy =

Green Hills Academy (GHA)
- Earthquake Relief School

Location
- Tarakeshwor; Kathmandu, Bagmati; Nepal
- 27.7840413°N 85.3013845°E

Information
- Type: Private
- Motto: Knowledge is the source of light
- Established: 2000 A.D./2057 B.S.
- School district: Kathmandu
- Principal: Rajeshwar Pd. Yadav
- Staff: 60+
- Faculty: 50+
- Enrollment: 800+
- Houses: Green, Blue, Red, Yellow
- Color: Various
- Song: Sayaun Thunga Phulka; Thank you god for world so sweet
- Nickname: GHA/Green Hills
- Affiliations: National PABSON
- Website: www.gha.edu.np

Green Hills Academy is a secondary school situated in the Kavresthali, Tarkeshwor, Ward No. 2, North side of Kathmandu, Nepal.

== Location ==
The school is situated in Tarkeshwor - 2, Kathmandu in the lap of Shivapuri National Park, about 5.5 km from Balaju, Bypass.
