= Naikap Naya Bhanjyang =

Naikap Naya Bhanjyang नैकाप नयाँभञ्ज्यांग
- Village of Chandragiri Municipality
- Location in Nepal
- Coordinates: 27.69°N 85.27°E
- Country: Nepal
- Province: No. 3
- District: Kathmandu District

Population (1991)
  - Total: 4,425
- Time zone: UTC+5:45 (Nepal Time)

Naikap Naya Bhanjyang is a village and former Village Development Committee that is now part of Chandragiri Municipality in Kathmandu District in Province No. 3 of central Nepal. At the time of the 1991 Nepal census it had a population of 4,425.
