= Matatirtha =

Matatirtha मातातीर्थ
- Village of Chandragiri Municipality
- Pond at Matatirtha

- Location in Nepal
- Coordinates: 27°40′N 85°14′E
- Country: Nepal
- Province: No. 3
- District: Kathmandu District

Government
  - Type: Local Government
  - Ward Chairman: Santosh Khadka
  - Ward Secretary: Purna Bahadur Bika

Population (2018)
  - Total: 5,982
- Time zone: UTC+5:45 (Nepal Time)

Matatirtha is a village and former Village Development Committee that is now part of Chandragiri Municipality in Kathmandu District in Province No. 3 of central Nepal. At the time of the 1991 Nepal census it had a population of 2,799 living in 506 households. Its population has now grown to 5,982 spread over 1,314 households. Santosh Khadka was elected as Ward Chairman of Matatirtha through a local election.

== Etymology ==
The word Matatirtha comes from two Sanskrit words, "Mata" meaning mother and "tirtha" meaning a sacred place. The VDC owes its name from a sacred pond in the VDC dedicated to mother. Matatirtha is a sacred place and famous because of the religious aspects and values. Every year on mother's day thousands of people gather together to celebrate the day. Only the people who don't have their mother take a dip into the sacred pond and perform religious rituals in the temple. People from different religions visit and worship there.

== See also ==
- Matatirtha Temple, Hindu temple
- Matatirtha Aunsi
