= Dahachok =

Dahachok दहचोक
- Village of Chandragiri Municipality
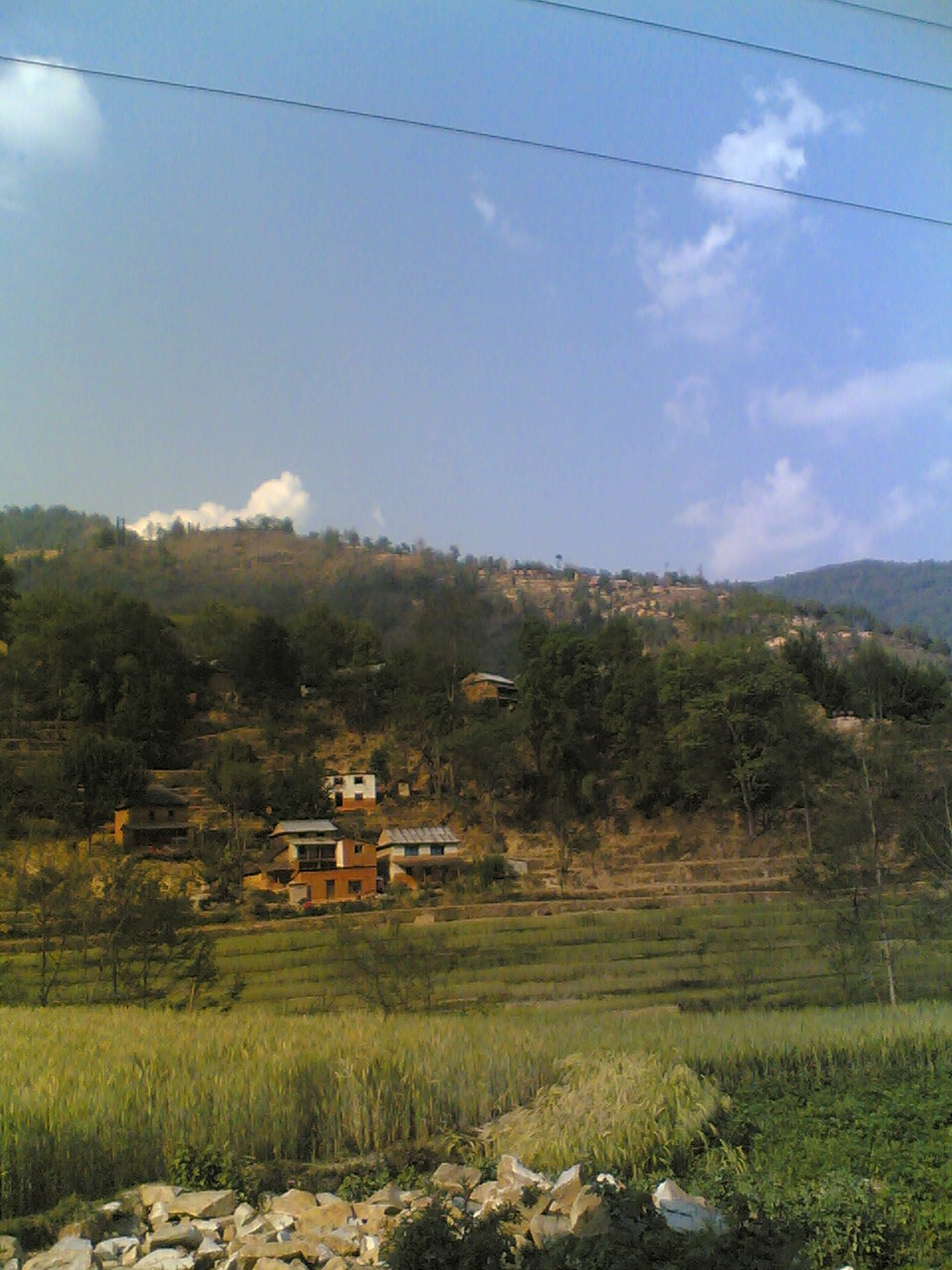
- Dahachowk

- Location in Nepal
- Coordinates: 27°42′39″N 85°13′42″E
- Country: Nepal
- Province: No. 3
- District: Kathmandu District

Population (2011)
  - Total: 4,036
- Time zone: UTC+5:45 (Nepal Time)

Dahachok is a village and former Village Development Committee that is now part of Chandragiri Municipality in Kathmandu District in Province No. 3 of central Nepal. At the time of the 2011 Nepal census it had a population of 4,036. It is located in the west of Kathmandu.

== Toponymy ==
=== Language origin ===
- Linguistic family: Indoeuropean
- Language: Sanskrit

=== Etymology ===
“Daha” means lake or pond. “Chok” means square, open space, or village/market center. Therefore, Dahachok can be interpreted as “the square by the pond” or “the open space near the lake.”

Daha (दह) means “lake, pond, reservoir” and comes from Sanskrit दह (daha) meaning “pond, pool, reservoir.” Chok (चोक) means “square, marketplace, central place, yard, plaza, quadrangle, courtyard” and comes from Sanskrit चतुष्क (catuṣka) meaning “crossing, junction,” in Nepali used as “plaza, open center.”

The toponym Dahachok thus combines a geographical feature (pond/lake) with a settlement feature (plaza/marketplace), giving the meaning “the square by the pond.”

== Kalu Pande memorial ==
The burial ground on hill top of Kaji Kalu Pande is a popular hiking spot. It lies in Chandragiri, western outskirts of Kathmandu from where Gorkha can be seen.

== Gallery ==
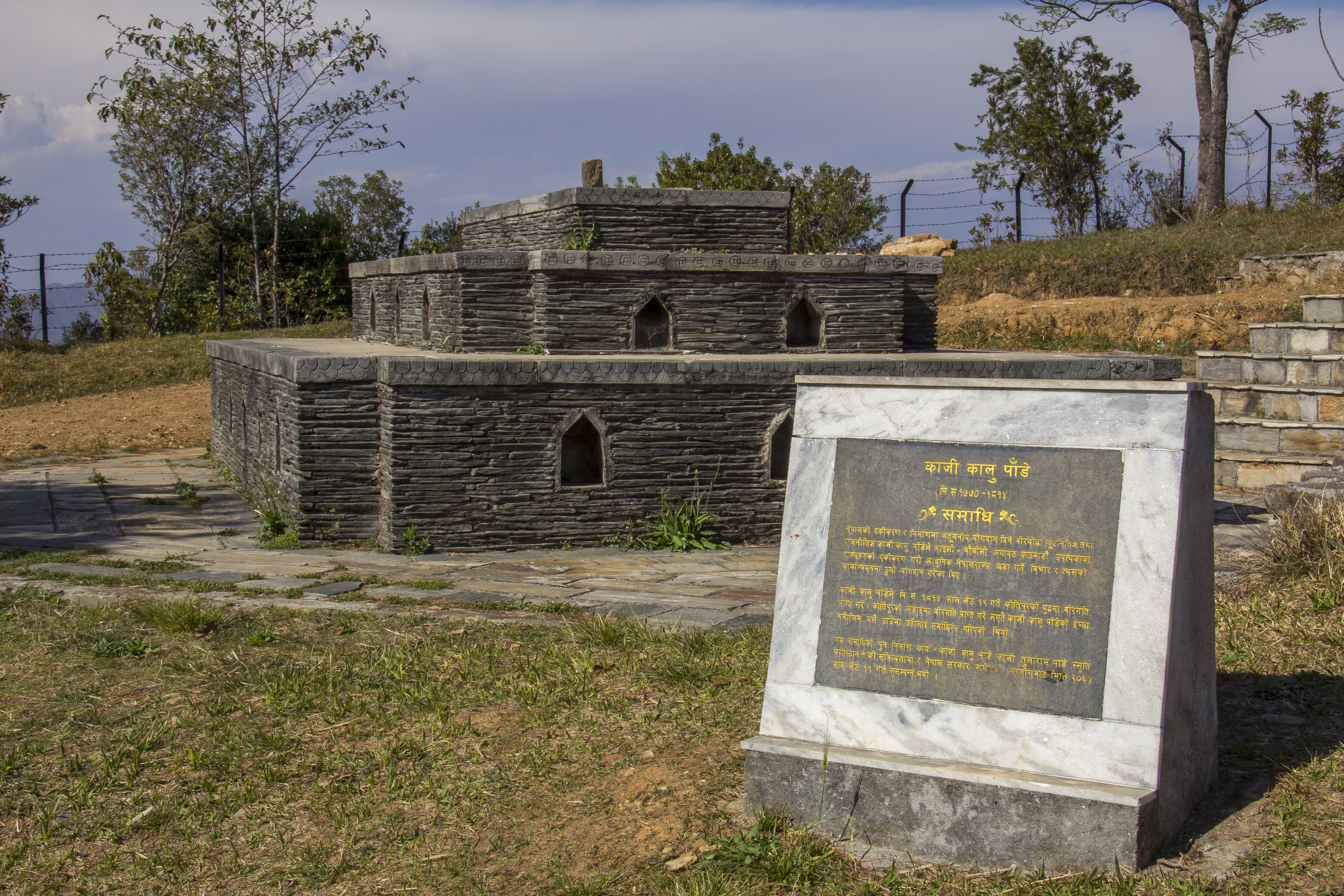
Memorial where Kalu Pande was assassinated in 1814 B.S.

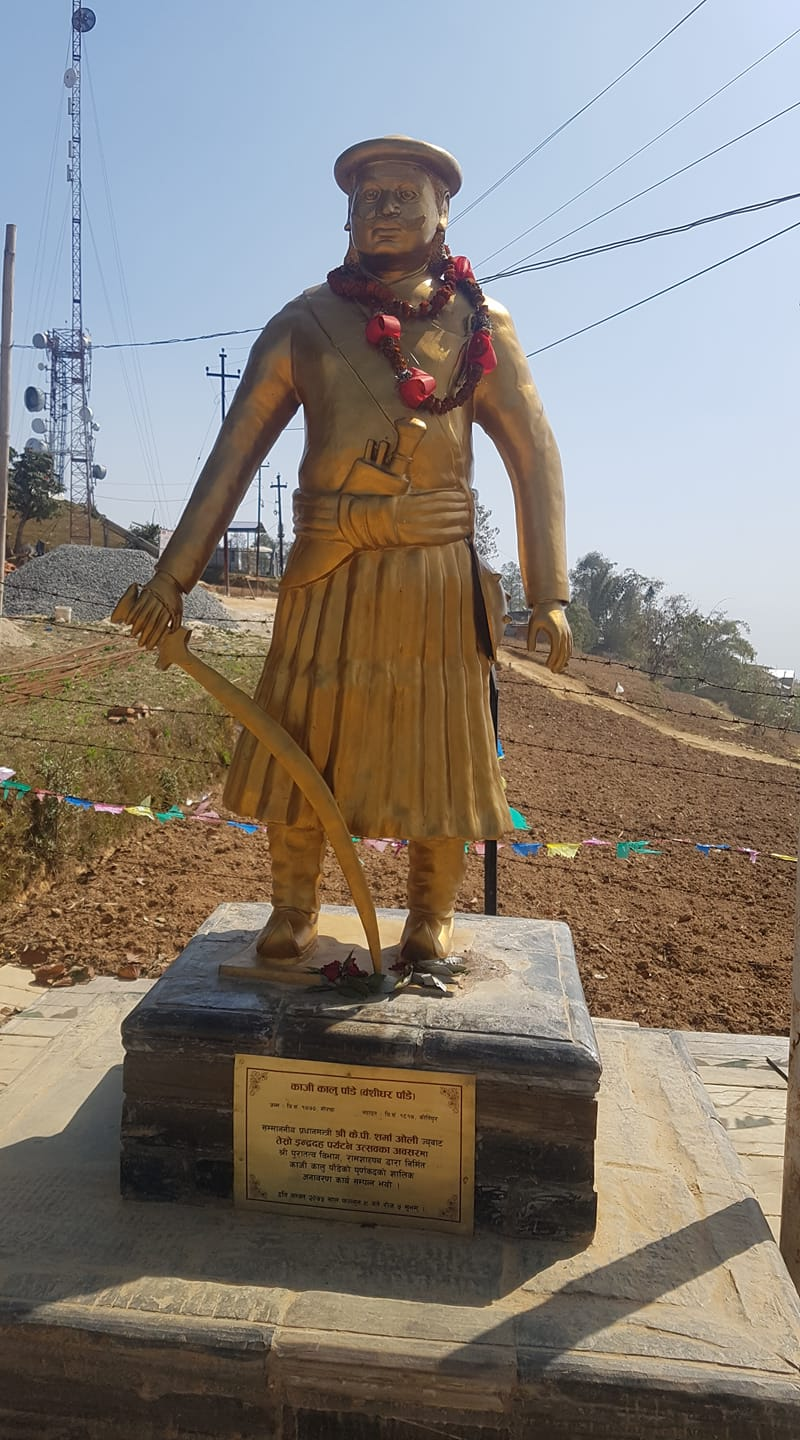
Kaji Kalu Pande Statue at Samadhisthal, Dahachowk
