= Thankot =

Thankot थानकोट Shonitpur
- Village of Chandragiri Municipality
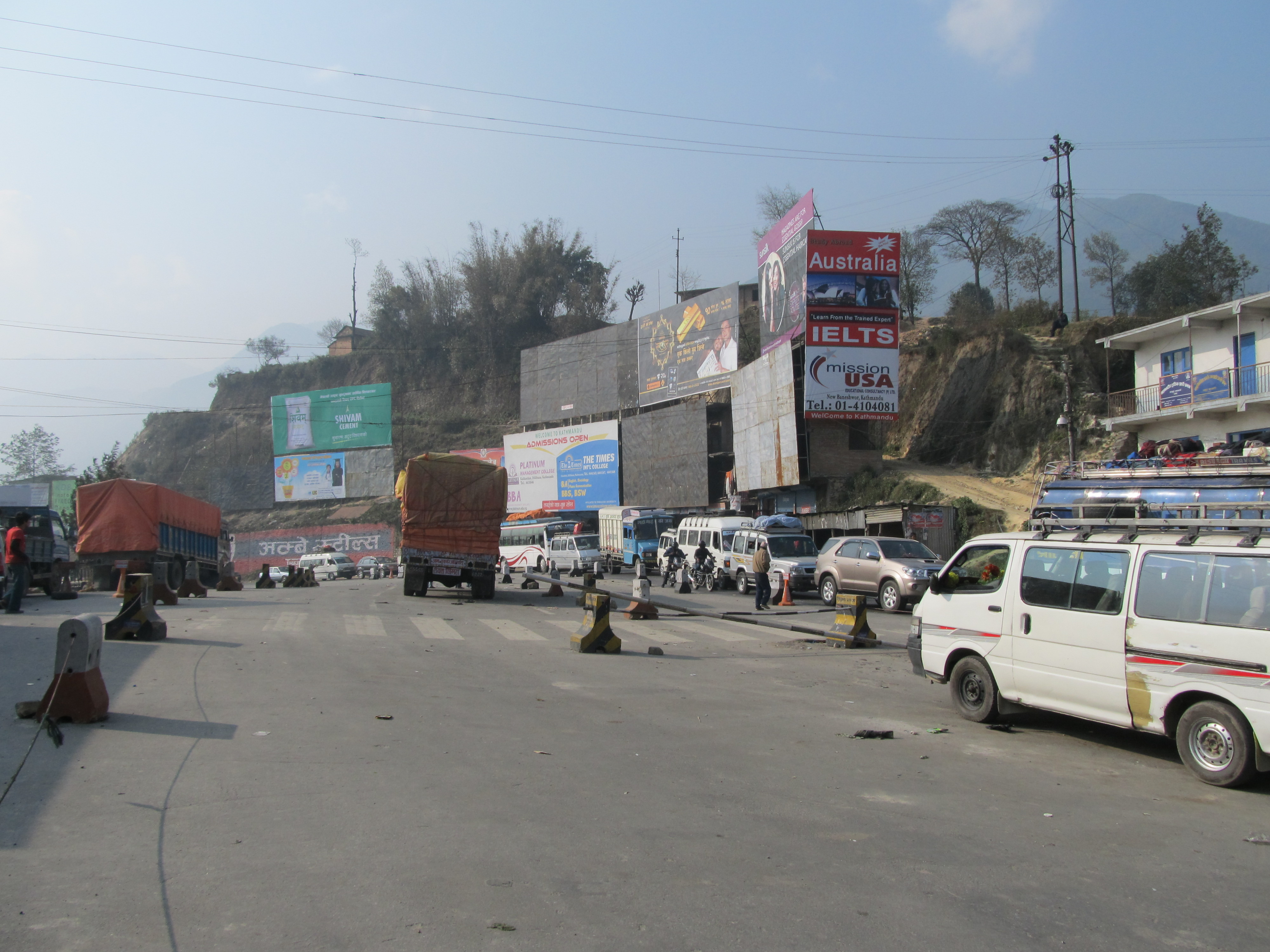

- Location in Nepal Thankot (Nepal)
- Coordinates: 27°41′N 85°11′E
- Country: Nepal
- Province: No. 3
- District: Kathmandu District

Population (2011)
  - Total: 12,047
- Time zone: UTC+5:45 (Nepal Time)
- Postal code: 44619
- Area code: 01

Thankot is a village and former Village Development Committee that is now part of Chandragiri Municipality in Kathmandu District in Province No. 3 of central Nepal. It lies in the lap of Chandragiri Hill. According to the 2011 Nepal census it has a population of 12,047 and has 2,820 households.

Some of the main attractions include Tribhuwan Park, Narayan Temple, Mahalaxmi Temple, and Chandragiri Hill.
