= Nagdhunga tunnel =

Highway tunnel in Nepal

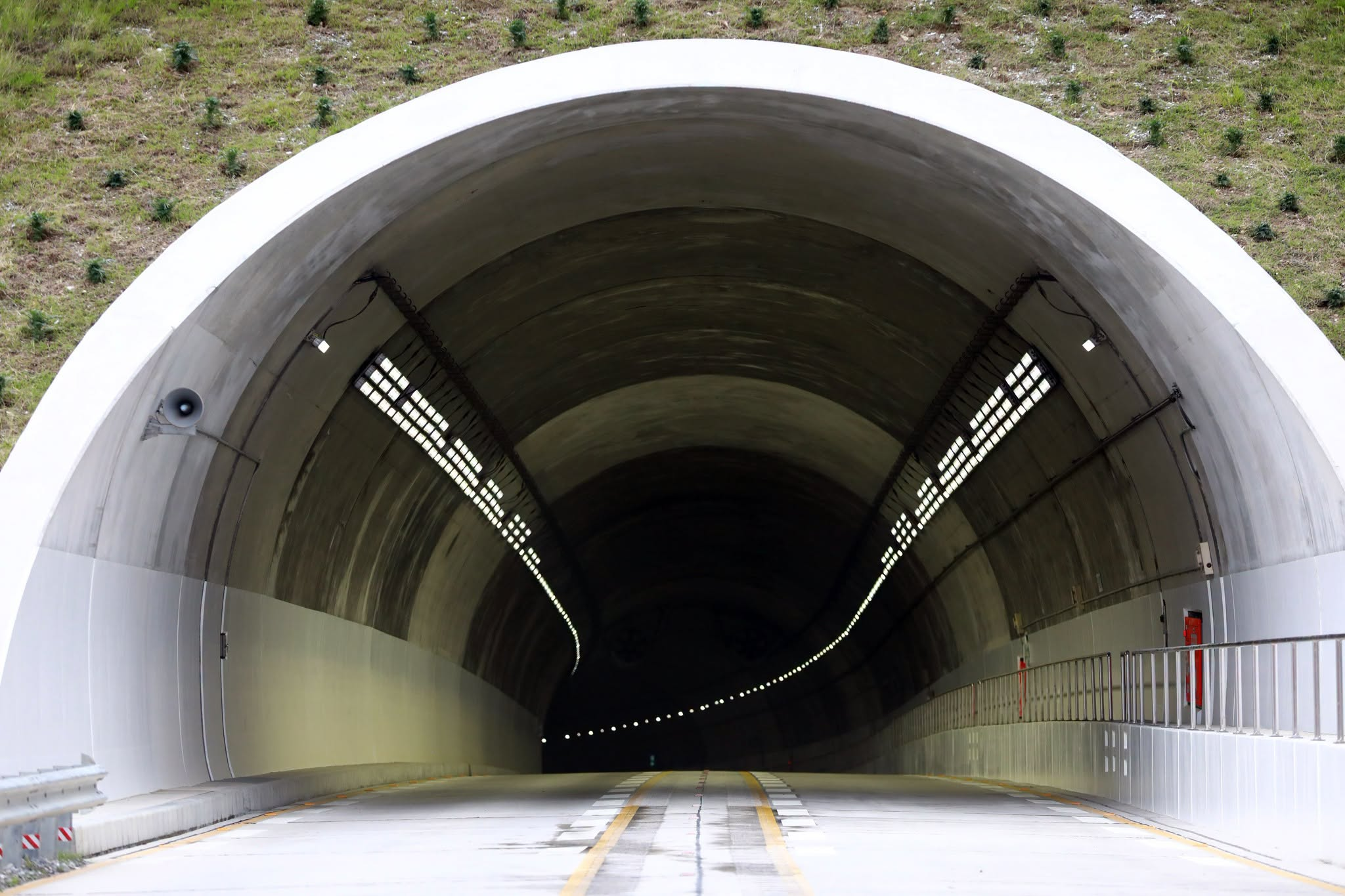

Overview
- Location: Bagmati Province, Nepal
- Status: Active
- Route: NH 41

Operation
- Work began: October 2019
- Constructed: May 2026
- Opened: 27 July 2026
- Owner: Department of Roads, Government of Nepal
- Operator: Yusin-ART JV
- Traffic: Automotive

Technical
- Length: 2.68 kilometres (1.67 mi)
- No. of lanes: Two (one in each direction)

Nagdhunga tunnel (Nepali: नागढुंगा सुरुङ्ग) is a 2.68-kilometre-long (1.67 mi) highway tunnel connecting Sisnekhola of Dhading district and Nagdhunga in Kathmandu. The tunnel is part of Tribhuvan highway. It is Nepal's first modern road tunnel. The tunnel has a height of 8.3m and has a lane of 9.5m wide.

== Geology ==
The tunnel passes through bedrocks of Sopyang formation. There are six shear zones in the alignment.

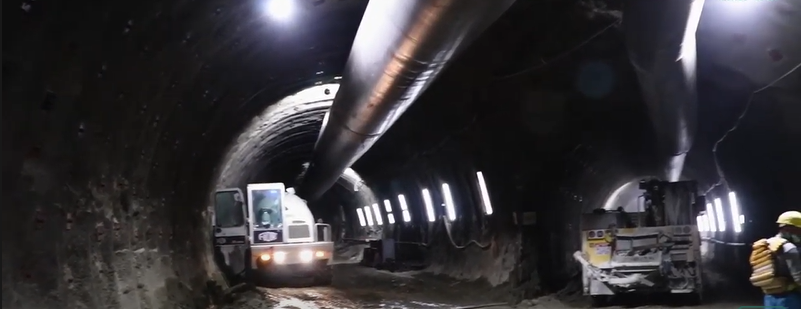
Nagdhunga Tunnel under construction (July 2021)

== Construction ==
The contractor of the project was Hazama Ando Corporation. Prime Minister K.P. Sharma Oli innagurated the construction work of the project by laying the foundation stone on 22 October, 2019. The project was initially scheduled to be finished by April 2023, but it was delayed due to COVID-19, local obstructions and other reasons. The initial cost estimate of the project was about NPR 22 billion. The project was financed through approximately Rs 21.5 billion in concessional loans from Japan, with the Nepal government contributing around Rs 6 billion. The final work related to tunnel was completed in May 2026 and was officially handed over to the government.

== Opening and operation ==
The Nagdhunga–Sisnekhola Tunnel was formally inaugurated on 27 July 2026. Government officials, representatives of the Japan International Cooperation Agency and other invited guests attended the ceremony.

The tunnel began operating in phases rather than opening immediately to all categories of traffic. During the initial phase, access was limited to ambulances, fire engines, security vehicles and other essential-service vehicles while its safety, traffic-management and operating systems were tested.

Traffic access was scheduled to be expanded gradually in accordance with the authorities' operational plan. No toll was collected during the initial trial-operation period.

Motorcycles, scooters, three-wheelers and pedestrians are prohibited from using the tunnel. Vehicles carrying fuel, gas, explosives and other flammable or hazardous materials are also restricted.

The operation and maintenance of the tunnel were assigned to Yusin–ART Joint Venture under a five-year contract. Its responsibilities include routine inspections, maintenance of civil, mechanical and electrical systems, safety management and toll collection.

== Specifications ==
Salient features of the tunnel are as follows:

- Tunnel: 2.688 km (1.7 mi), 2 lanes, total tunnel (carriageways) width 9.5 m, grade 3.5%
- Evacuation tunnel: 2.55 km (1.6 mi) parallel to main tunnel with interconnections at regular intervals
- Approach road: 2.60 km, 2 lanes of 3.5 m width, 2 m shoulder on both sides
- Bridge: 1 overpass and 3 underpass
- Flyover: 1 at Balambu interchange
- Toll facility: West side 3 booths, 3 lanes each and East side 2 booths, 2 lanes each
- Tunnel management office: West side area 390 sq.m and east side 300 sq.m
- Disposal area development at the east portal,
- Transmission line: 4.14 km.
- Final built cost: Rs 29 billion

== See also ==
- List of tunnels in Nepal
