= Kavresthali Secondary School =

- (Thathi)
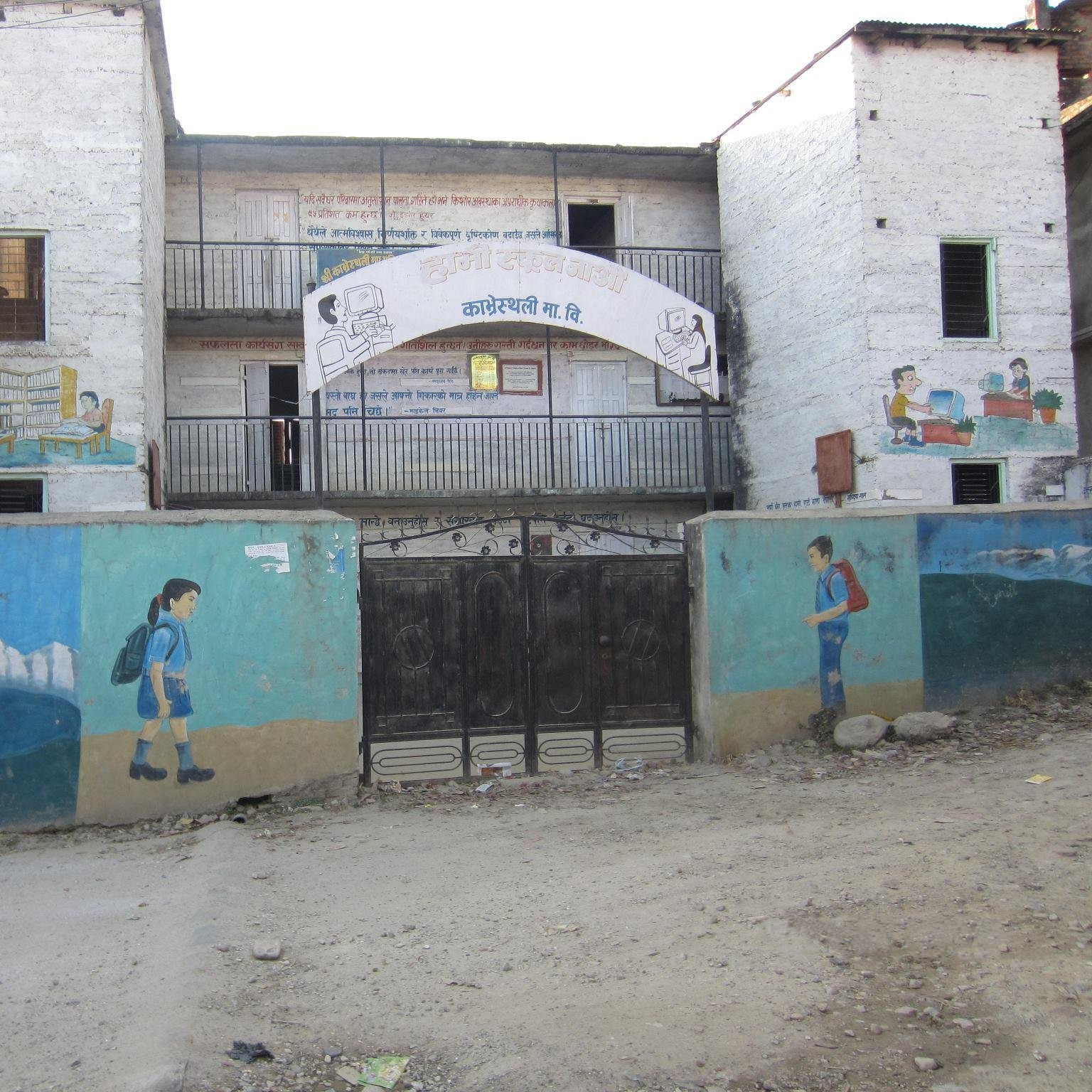

Location
- Kavresthali VDC; Kathmandu; Nepal

Information
- Type: Public school
- Motto: जननी जन्मभूमिश्च स्वर्गादपि गरीयसी (Nepali) "Mother and Motherland are Greater than Heaven"
- Established: 2019 B.S
- Founder: Mr.Tirtha Prasad Dhakal
- School district: Kathmandu
- Director: Mr. Shukdev Dhakal
- Headmaster: Prahlad Pokhrel
- Grades: 1 to 10
- Enrollment: 300 approximately
- Song: Sayaun Thunga Phulka "Made of Hundreds of Flowers"
- Nickname: Thati
- Affiliations: Nepal Government

Kavresthali Secondary School.
