= Machhegaun =

Machhegaun मच्छेगाऊ
- Village of Chandragiri Municipality
- Location in Nepal
- Coordinates: 27.66°N 85.25°E
- Country: Nepal
- Province: No. 3
- District: Kathmandu District

Population (1991)
  - Total: 2,871
- Time zone: UTC+5:45 (Nepal Time)

Machhegaun (Sanskrit: मच्छेगाऊं) is a village and former Village Development Committee that is now part of Chandragiri Municipality in Kathmandu District in Province No. 3 of central Nepal. At the time of the 1991 Nepal census it had a population of 2,871.

== Things to do in Machhegaun ==
Machhegaun is a mixture of nature, people and their culture. It is situated at the lap of Chandragiri hills. Chandragiri has been well known to the residents of Kathmandu since the regulation of Cable car and viewpoint developed for tourist visit. Following are some places to visit and do in Machhegaun.

Devotion: There is an ancient Matsya Narayan Temple located at the center of the town. There's evidence that it was originally built around 500 years ago. The temple is surrounded by natural spring water. It is believed that taking bath in that water purifies one's body, mind and soul. Furthermore, there are Vaisnavi temple, Buddha Bihar (Shaa-Khalba), few Chaityas, Falcha, statues of different gods and goddesses around.

Cafes and Bars: There are few local bars (Vatti in local language) that offer locally made alcoholic drinks like raksi, chyaag and others. With local flavoured snacks, also known as sittan, made from veg and non-veg items are available in those bars. Cafes and Chiya pasal is equally popular in this town. Though these local businesses don't seem hygienic, people seem to enjoy being there.

Bush walk: A day hike can be done here. One can start climbing to the top of the hill from the main gate near the street that is close to Matsya Narayan temple. Along the way there is large Buddha statue the final reach is a Japanese Buddhist monastery which is under construction till 2023. Another option for hiking could be up for Chandragiri and Champadevi which takes bit longer time to complete.

Buddha statue built in 2011, is now a landmark in Machhegaun attracting thousands of people to visit every year. A brick and stone paved staircase has been constructed since the statue was established to facilitate the pilgrimage. The view from the top of the hill, where the site has been developed, has views of Kathmandu Valley.

== History ==
Its name came from Machhenarayan, an avatar of God Vishnu. It is said that during ancient time, Manu found a small fish about to die while he was having a bath in a river. He brought the fish to his home and put it into a small pot of water. Next day, the fish grew in its size amazingly and would no longer fit in the small pot. So, he put the fish in a pond just to find next day that the fish had grown larger and no longer fit in the pond as well. Knowing that this fish is no ordinary fish, Manu bowed with respect and asked to show the fish who he was. Then God Vishnu emerged from the mouth of the fish. To remember this event, Manu established Machhenarayan temple in the center of the pond.

A mela (fair), named MangalMas, is organized every three years in Machhegaun for a month, mostly during a month from April to July. During this month God Vishnu is worshiped all over the country.

== Location ==
The village is located west of Kirtipur. It is around 7–8 km from the center of Kathmandu city.
