= Nepalese handicrafts =

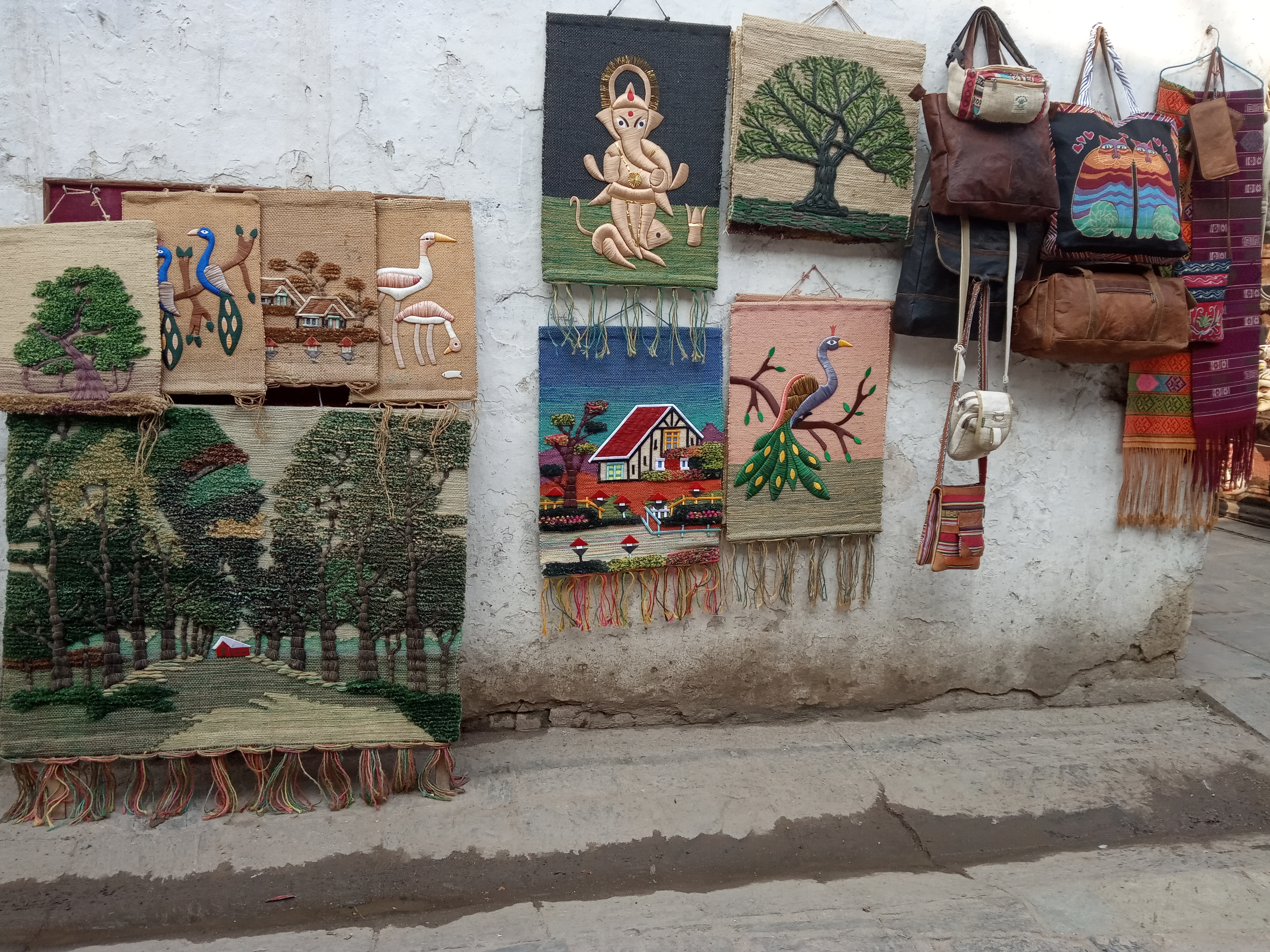
Nepalese Handicrafts

Nepalese handicraft history can be traced back to the Stone Age when human beings were inadequate of tools of every things. The history of artistic handicrafts only began during the 5th century AD, when different religions began to form their bases among the people of Nepal. Hence we see a lot of religious influence on Nepalese handicrafts.

== History ==
The historical development of the Nepalese handicraft industry is very old although has its rise and falls. According to the reference found in Kautilya's Economics about various productions and exports from Nepal, during the time of Chandra Gupta Mouriya, in the fourth century, Nepal was known for quality rainproof woolen blanket woolen blankets. The blankets were made of eight pieces joined of black color known as "bhiringisi" as well as "apasaraka". Similarly the good quality blankets are mentioned in the epics of Jain religion "Brihatakalpasutra Vhashya". Various famous Chinese travellers like Wanghunshe and Huansang in 648 AD have appreciated Nepalese arts and crafts and the skills of Nepalese craftsmen and artisans in their travelogues.

From the beginning up to the mid-nineteenth century, the rulers of the country promoted national industries and trade to various measures of production, promotion and encouragement. Saving national industry only imported commodities which were not produced locally. Towards the end of the nineteenth century, Nepalese arts and crafts industry and the entire home based industries in general suffered a great deal due to the general liberal import policy of the government. Prior to the establishment of British regime over India and entering a peace treaty with Tibet in 1904 AD, Nepal was interpreted as the main route to Tibet for external trade with other countries. But the treaty of 1904 AD facilitated the British to open a new route between India and Tibet through Chumbic Valley and the trade route treaty of 1923 AD between Nepal and British India, which was not in favour of Nepal and had very unfavourable effects both on industries and on flourishing trade of the country.

== Significance ==
In Nepal, the production of handicraft is an age-old practice. Novel handicraft is also developed in harmony with changing market taste. For the last 25–30 years, export of handicrafts has been growing. The development of handicraft helps the conservation of national heritage and culture of country; which in return contributes to appease poverty by creating job opportunities. The handicrafts of Nepal is produced in a traditional way, from generations to generations leading the footpath of ancestors or from forefather to grandfather to father and to son and this continuity has given the survival to Nepalese handicrafts, preserving their heritage, cultural values, aspects and tradition. More recently, these arts and crafts is one of the major exporting industry of Nepal, earning foreign exchange and providing employment to thousands of Nepalese craftsmen, artisans, promoters and businessmen generating revenue to government.

== Classification ==
Handicrafts in Nepal are classified mainly in two types vizz Textile products and Non- textile products.

=== Textile products ===
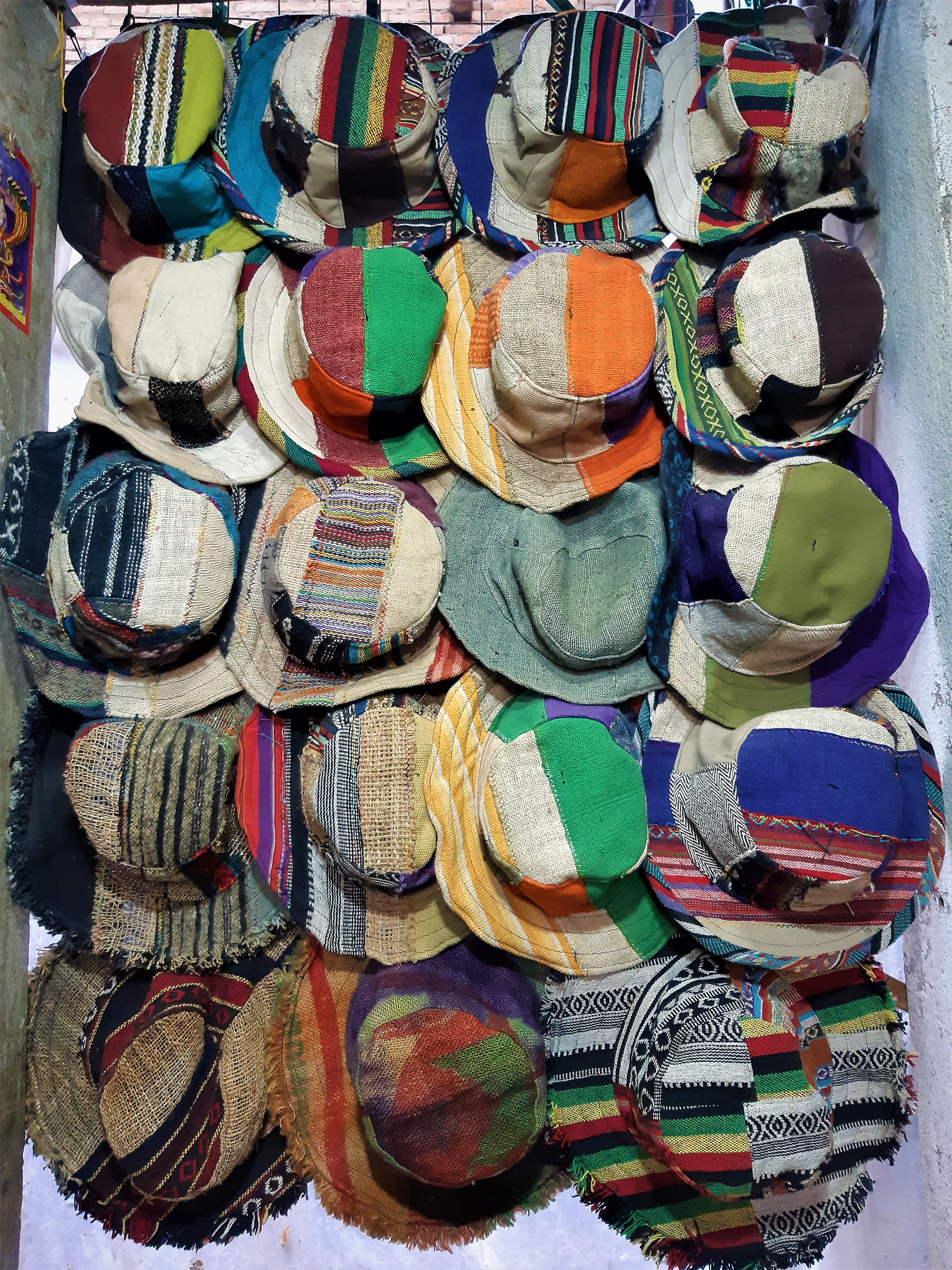
Hemp Hats Shop in Thamel, Nepal

Textile products includes the following:

- Carpets and Rugs
- Pashmina Products
- Woollen Goods
- Felt Products
- Silk Products
- Cotton Goods
- Hemp Goods
- Alloy Goods
- Dhaka Products
- Misc. Textile Products

=== Non textile products ===
The Non textile products includes the following products:

- Silver Jewellery
- Metal Craft
- Handmade Paper Products
- Wood Craft
- Glass Products
- Bone & Horn Products
- Crystal Products
- Ceramics Products
- Leather Goods
- Incense
- Plastic Items
- Paubha (Thanka)
- Beads Items
- Stone Craft
- Bamboo Products
- Miscellaneous Goods

== Present context ==
Handicraft has become the major source of foreign revenue and foreign currency today. in the slagging export economy, it is the only good source of revenue that has good international market. Government of Nepal has also put this sector as the competitive product of Nepal. Many entrepreneurs locally and internationally are emerging in this sector to make international trade. There are many online websites on Nepalese handicrafts, which are used by international customers for ordering products.

== Categories ==
Nepalese Handicrafts can be categorized into two major divisions:

=== Traditional/Conventional ===
Products such as metal statues, ethnic costumes, traditional silver jewellery, wood carving, religious and ritual objects like bells, vajra, stone sculpture, metal utensil, paubha painting, ceramics, Handmade Paper, Hand Knitwear, filigree, Bell, Vajra products are traditional Nepalese crafts.

=== Contemporary/Modern ===
Products like home furnishing material, floor covering, modern painting, patina products, felt crafts, puzzle toys, macramé (knot crafts), pashmina, leather products, modern silver jewellery gift ware, decorative items, dolls & puppets, crazy hats, batik, bead Crafts, bone & horn products, natural buttons etc. are some of the modern forms of Nepalese handicrafts.
