= Matatirtha Aunsi =

Festival in Nepal

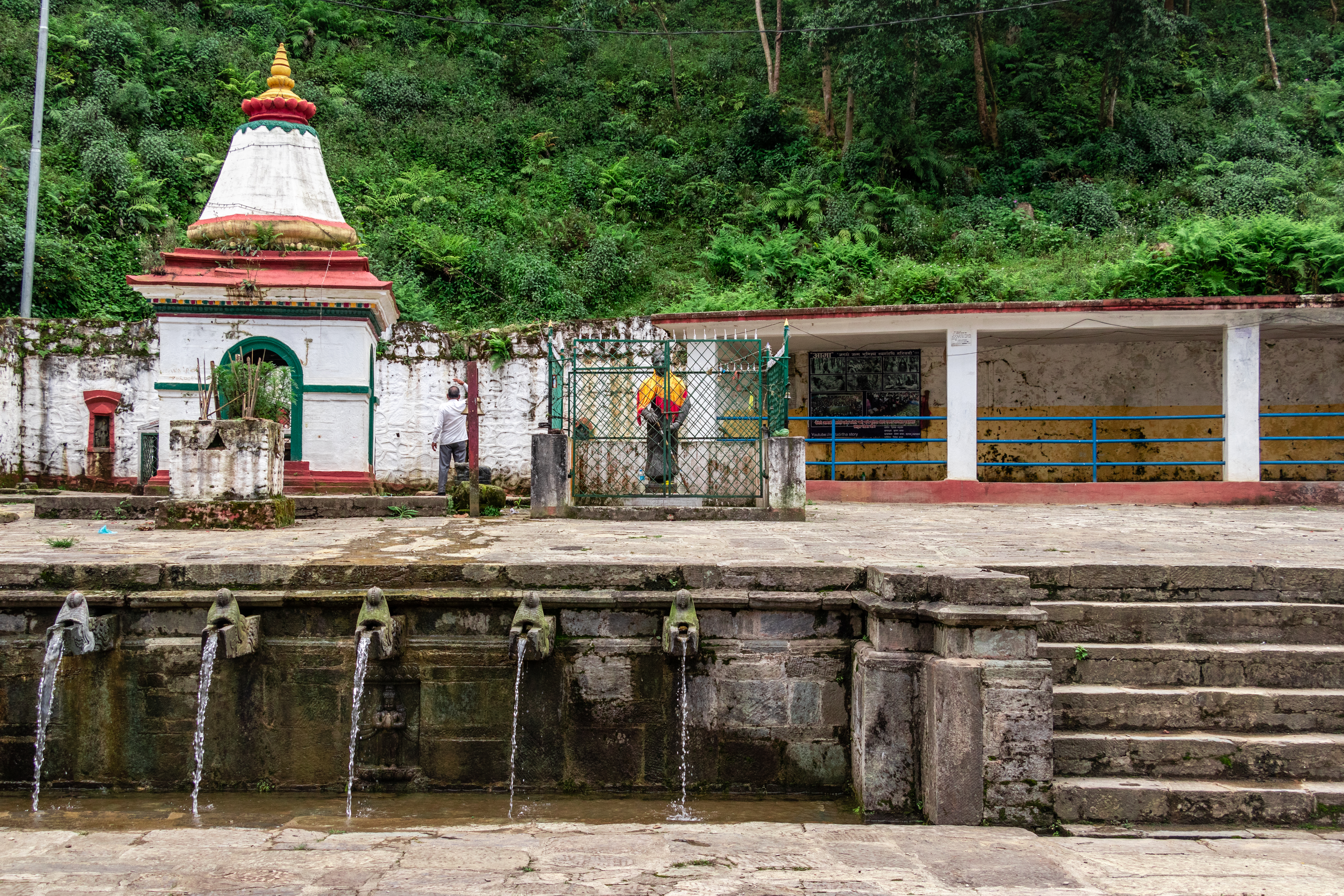
- Matatirtha Temple
- Also called: Aamako Mukh herne din (Seeing Mother’s face day)
- Observed by: Hindu
- Significance: Day to honor mothers and motherhood
- Observances: offer sweets, clothes etc.
- Date: Baisakh Krishna aaunshi

Matatirtha Aunsi is a day-long festival in Nepal. This day is celebrated to honor mothers and motherhood. On this day, people offer sweets, clothes, and other gift items to their mothers. According to Hindu tradition, the festival is celebrated on the new moon that falls in the month of Baisakh as per the lunar calendar.

Matatirtha Pond is a pilgrimage site on the western outskirts of Kathmandu visited to remember deceased mothers. It is believed that those who take a holy bath in Mata Tirtha and offer tarpan today helps his/her mother reach salvation and bring prosperity to the family. Legend states that people can see their departed mother's face in the pond.
