= Kathmandu District =

Kathmandu District काठमाडौं जिल्ला
- District
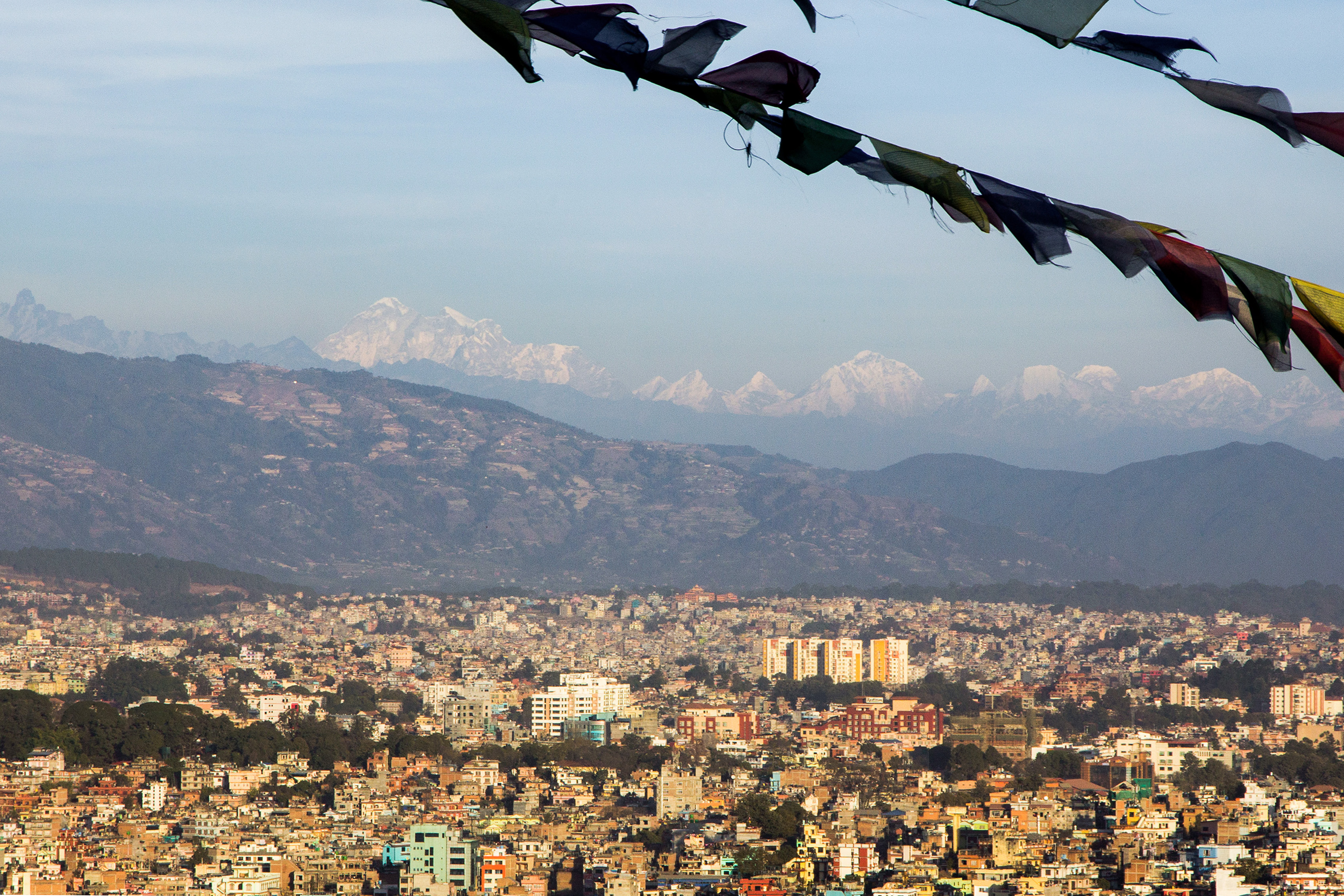
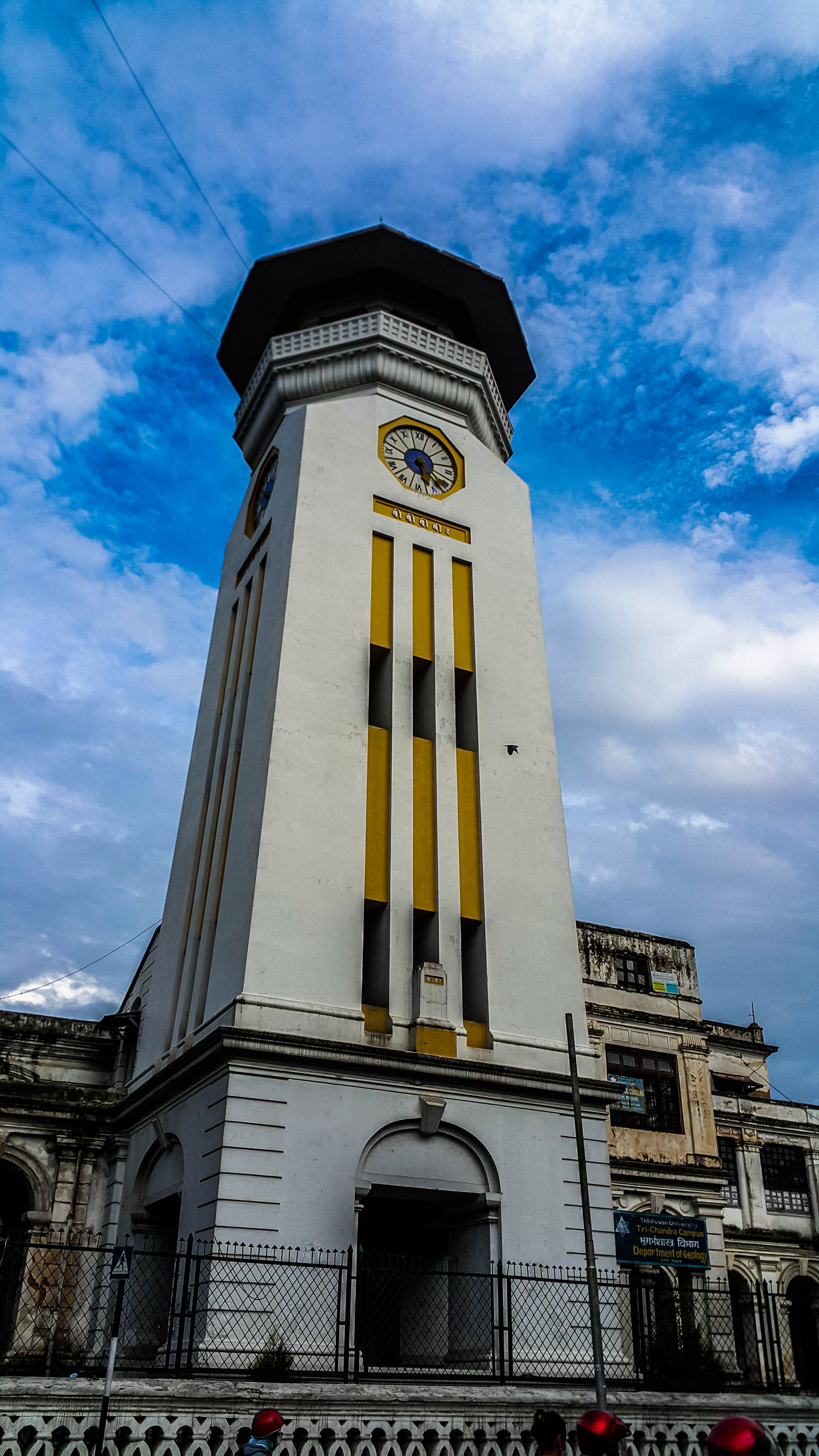
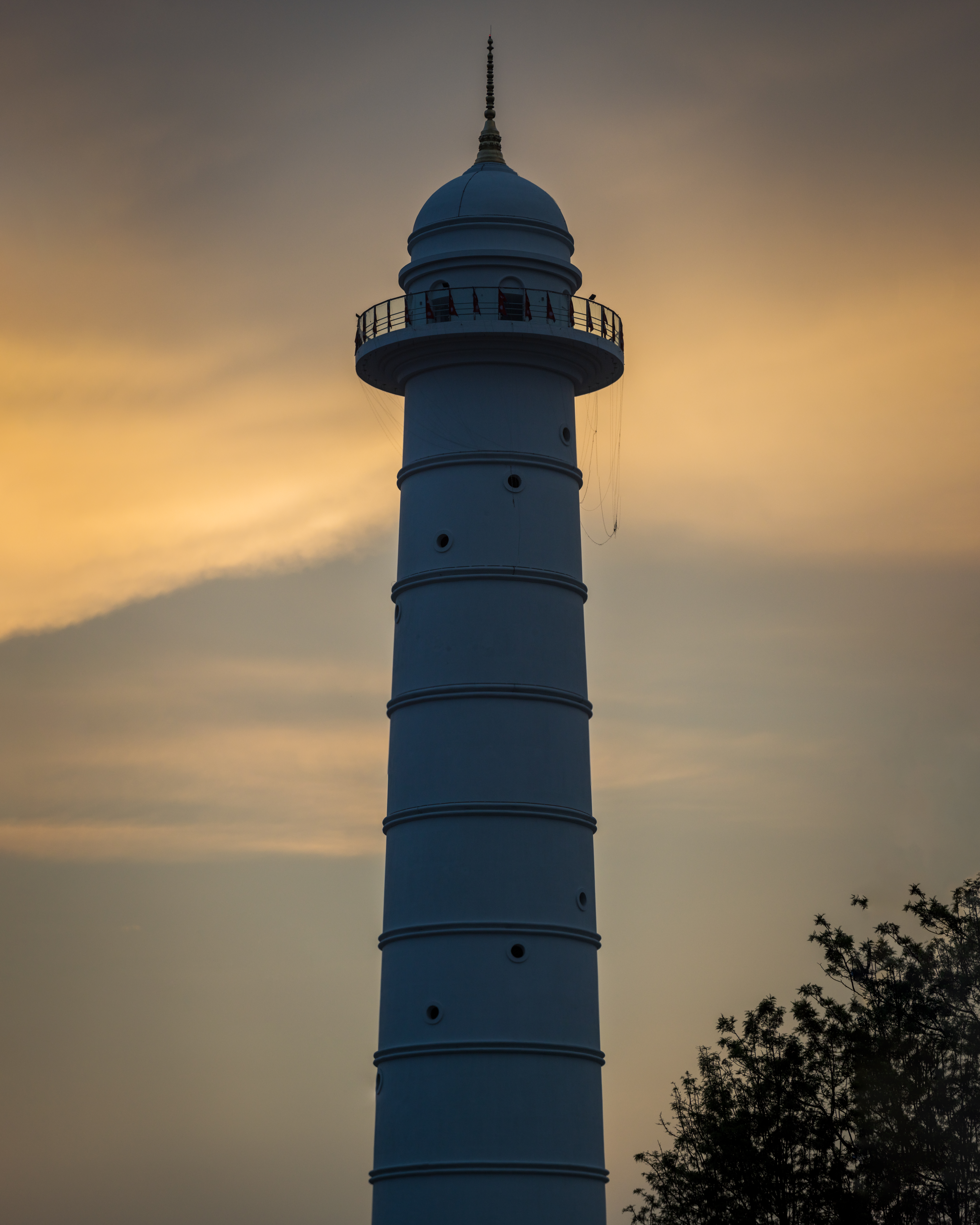
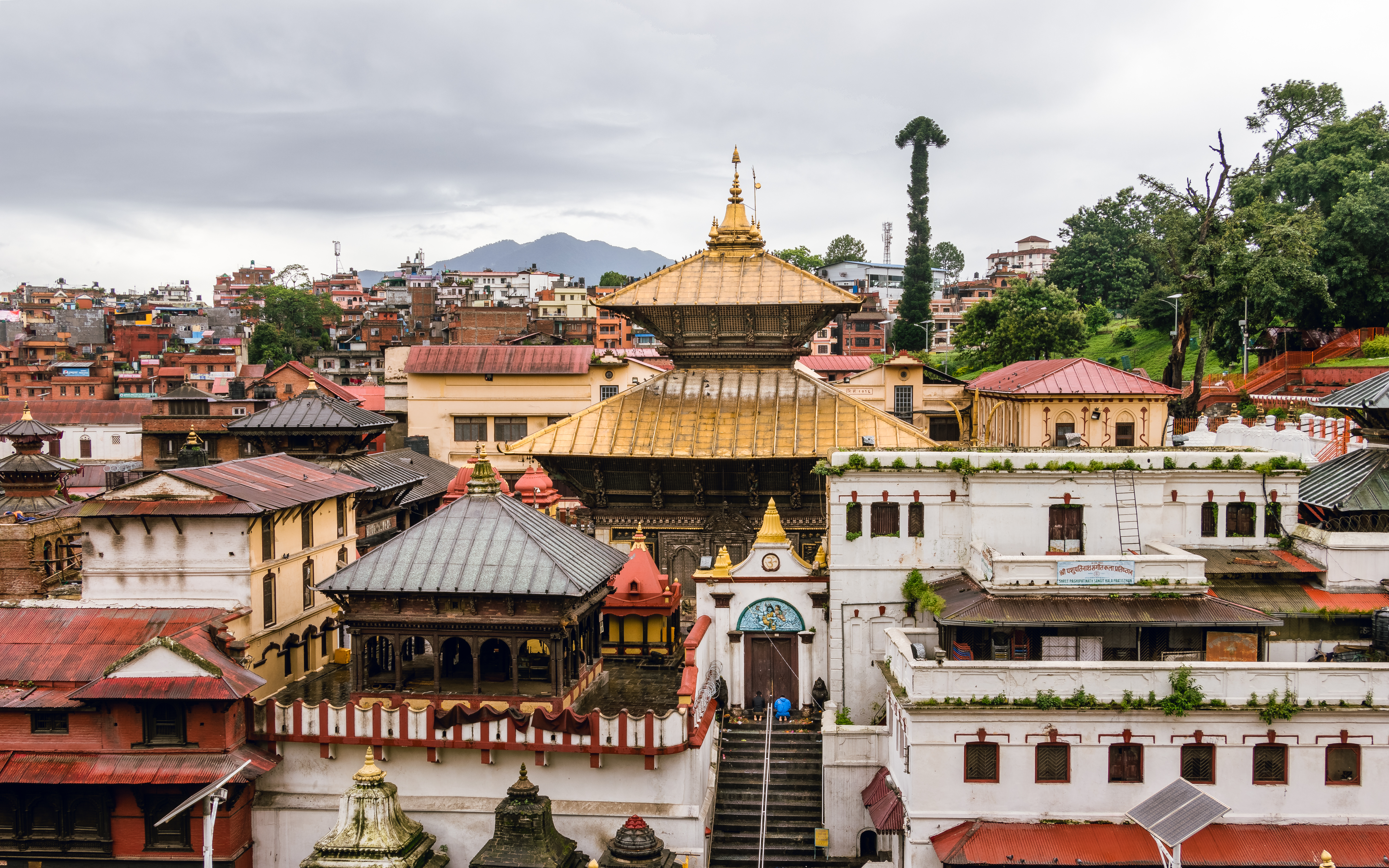
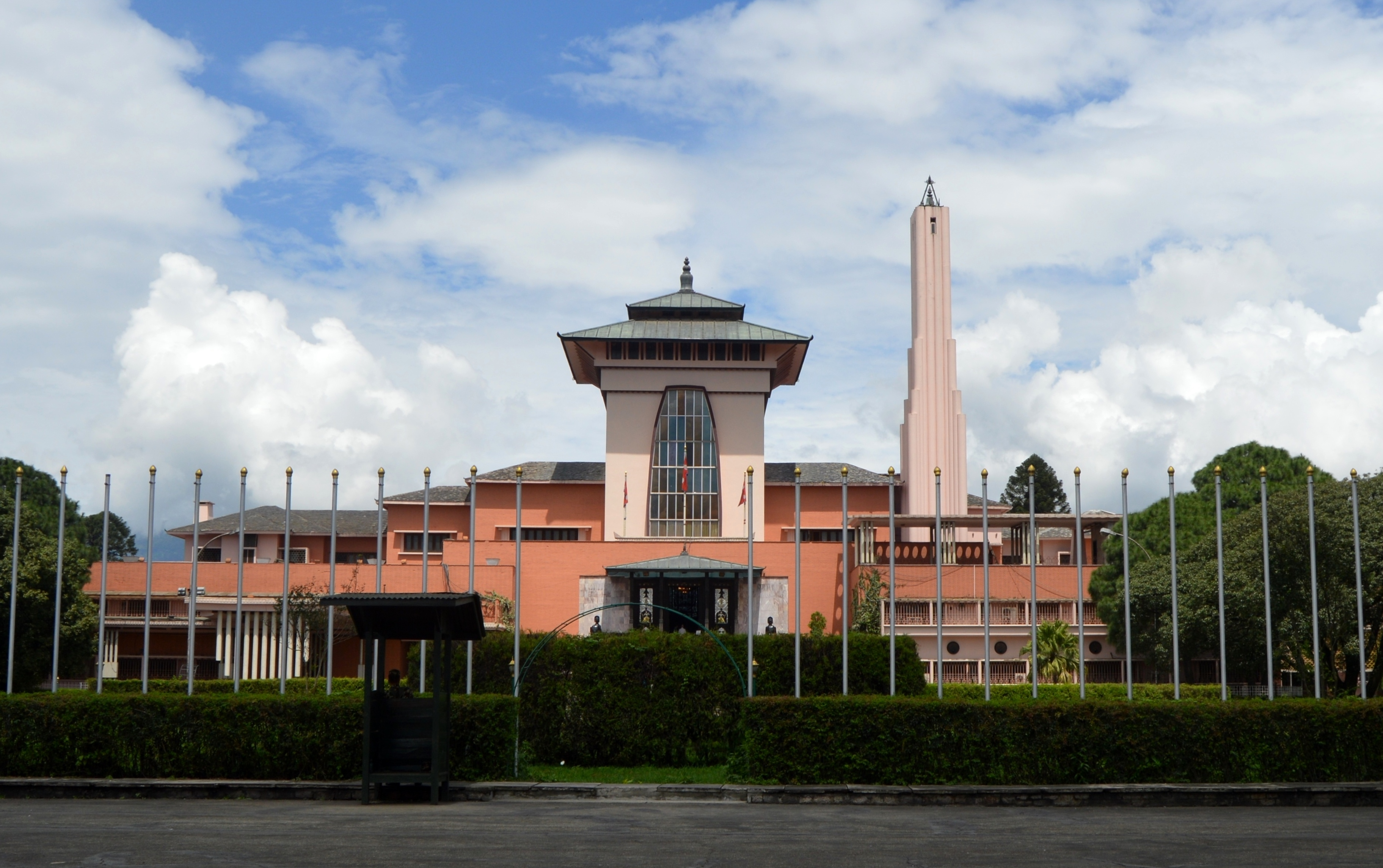
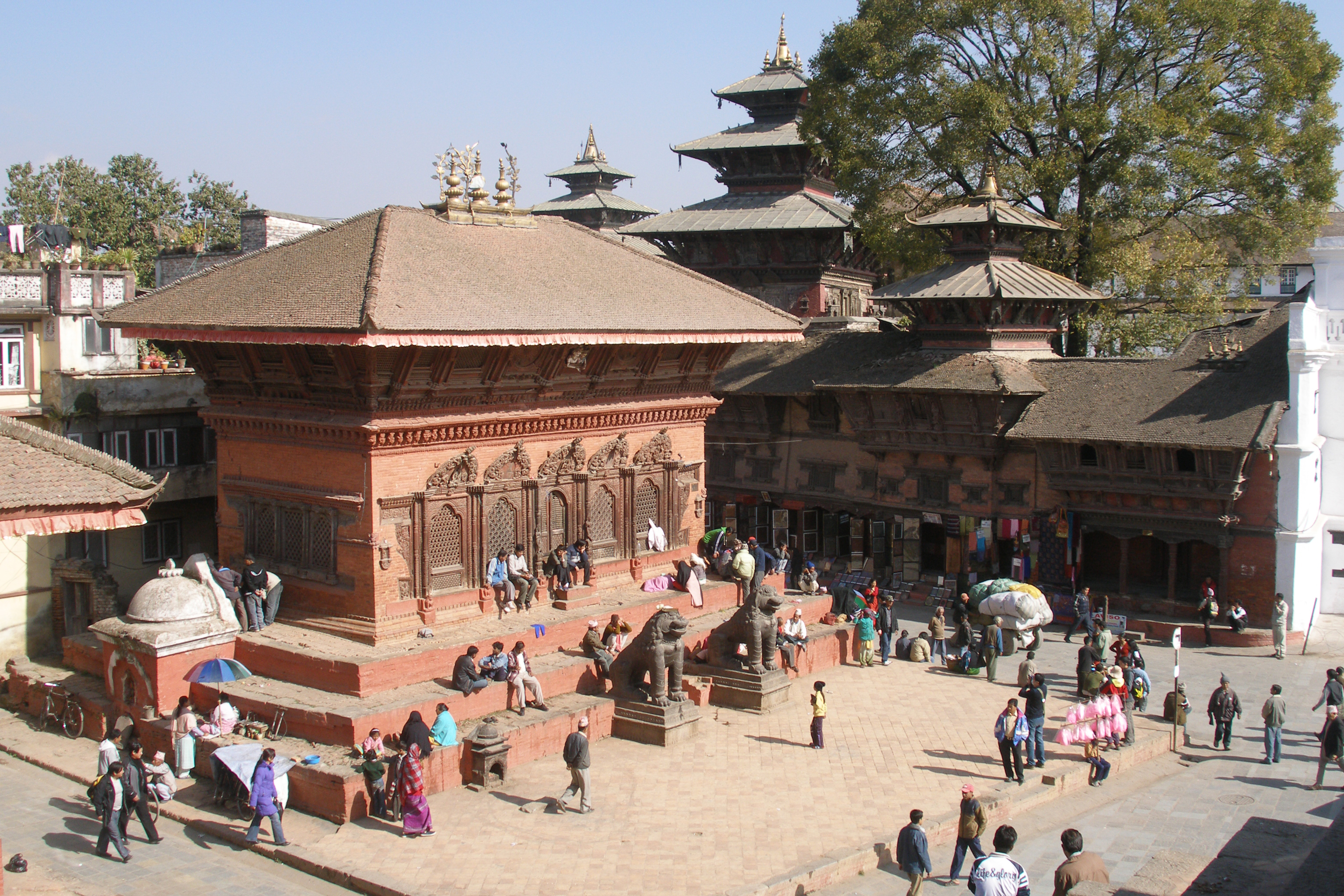
- Kathmandu's skyline with Gaurishankar visible Ghanta Ghar Dharahara Pashupatinath Temple Narayanhiti Palace Kathmandu Durbar Square

- Map of Kathmandu District
- Interactive map of Kathmandu District
- Country: Nepal
- Province: Bagmati Province
- Admin HQ.: Kathmandu

Government
  - Type: Coordination committee
  - Body: DCC, Kathmandu

Area
  - Total: 413.69 km^{2} (159.73 sq mi)

Population (2021)
  - Total: 2,041,587
  - Density: 4,935.1/km^{2} (12,782/sq mi)
- Time zone: UTC+05:45 (NPT)
- Main Language(s): Nepali; Newari
- Website: Official website

Kathmandu District (Nepali: काठमाडौं जिल्ला; Nepal Bhasa: ये: जिल्ला) is a district located in Kathmandu Valley, Bagmati Province of Nepal. It is one of the seventy-seven districts of Nepal, covers an area of 413.69 km^{2} (159.73 sq mi), and is the most densely populated district of Nepal with 1,081,845 inhabitants in 2001, 1,744,240 in 2011 and 2,041,587 in 2021. The administrative headquarters of Kathmandu district is located in Kathmandu. The city has 21 post offices which handle mail from across the country and beyond, with Kathmandu DPO having 44,600 as its postal code for international mail delivery services like UPS or DHL Couriers etc.

== Geography ==
Kathmandu district is one of the three districts located in Kathmandu Valley, which itself is located in the hills of Bagmati Province. The district is located from 27°27′E to 27°49′E longitude and 85°10′N to 85°32′N latitude.

The district is surrounded by:

- East: Bhaktapur District and Kavrepalanchok District
- West: Dhading District and Nuwakot District
- North: Nuwakot District and Sindhupalchok District
- South: Lalitpur District and Makwanpur District

The altitude of the district ranges from 1,262 m (4,140 ft) to 2,732 m (8,963 ft) above sea level.

=== Climate ===
Climate Zone	Elevation Range	% of Area
Subtropical	1,000 to 2,000 meters 3,300 to 6,600 ft.	88.2%
Temperate	2,000 to 3,000 meters 6,400 to 9,800 ft.	11.8%

In the urban center, the temperature fluctuates between 32 °C in summer (June–July) to -2 °C in winter (December–January). Except for the high hills including Chandragiri which has a temperate climate, Kathmandu district has a subtropical climate. The annual rainfall of the district is 176.4 ml.

== Culture ==
Kathmandu district is a part of Kathmandu Valley, which is a melting pot of various cultural groups, ethnicities, races, languages and religions. This vibrant culture is illustrated in the culture of the natives of the district, known as Newars, who are a multiethnic, multiracial, multireligious people bound by a Sanskritized Sino-Tibetan language of Kirat origins known as Nepal Bhasa. All the ancient settlements of the district have specific street festivals (jatras) arranged according to specific dates of the Nepal Sambat calendar. The main festivals celebrated are:

- Yanya Punhi – literally meaning Kathmandu's full moon, a week-long festival during the Yenla (the month of Kathmandu) of Nepal Sambat, a festival started by Gunakamadev, the founder of Kathmandu city to commemorate the establishment of the city
- Gunla – a month in which musical bands and ordinary people make pilgrimage to Swayambhunath temple
- Mohani
- Dashain – the main festival of Nepal, celebrated by visiting the various Shakta pithas around the city
- Shivaratri – a very special festival in which people make small fire all around the city and take different types of toxic in order to show love to Lord Shiva
- Buddha Jayanti
- Sa Paru – a comic festival to commemorate dead relatives, celebrated during the full moon of Goon la
- Chatha – the birthday of Lord Ganesha of Hindu pantheon
- Holil
- Pahan Chare – a festival of Animist origin celebrated by procession of matriarchs of Kathmandu
- Shree Panchami – in the past children used to formally start education on this day. Presently, deities of wisdom, Saraswati and Manjushree (the mythological founder of the valley) are worshipped on this day
- Swanti or Tihar – a five-day festival, the third day of which is called Laxmi Puja, when the families do their annual financial calculation and the next day marks the New Year according to Nepalese calendar, Nepal Sambat.

Along with these festivals, with the influx of population from other parts of Nepal, India, Tibet and South Asia, other festivals such as Teej, Chhath, Sakela, Lhosar, Janai Purnima, Deuda etc. are also celebrated.

== Economy ==
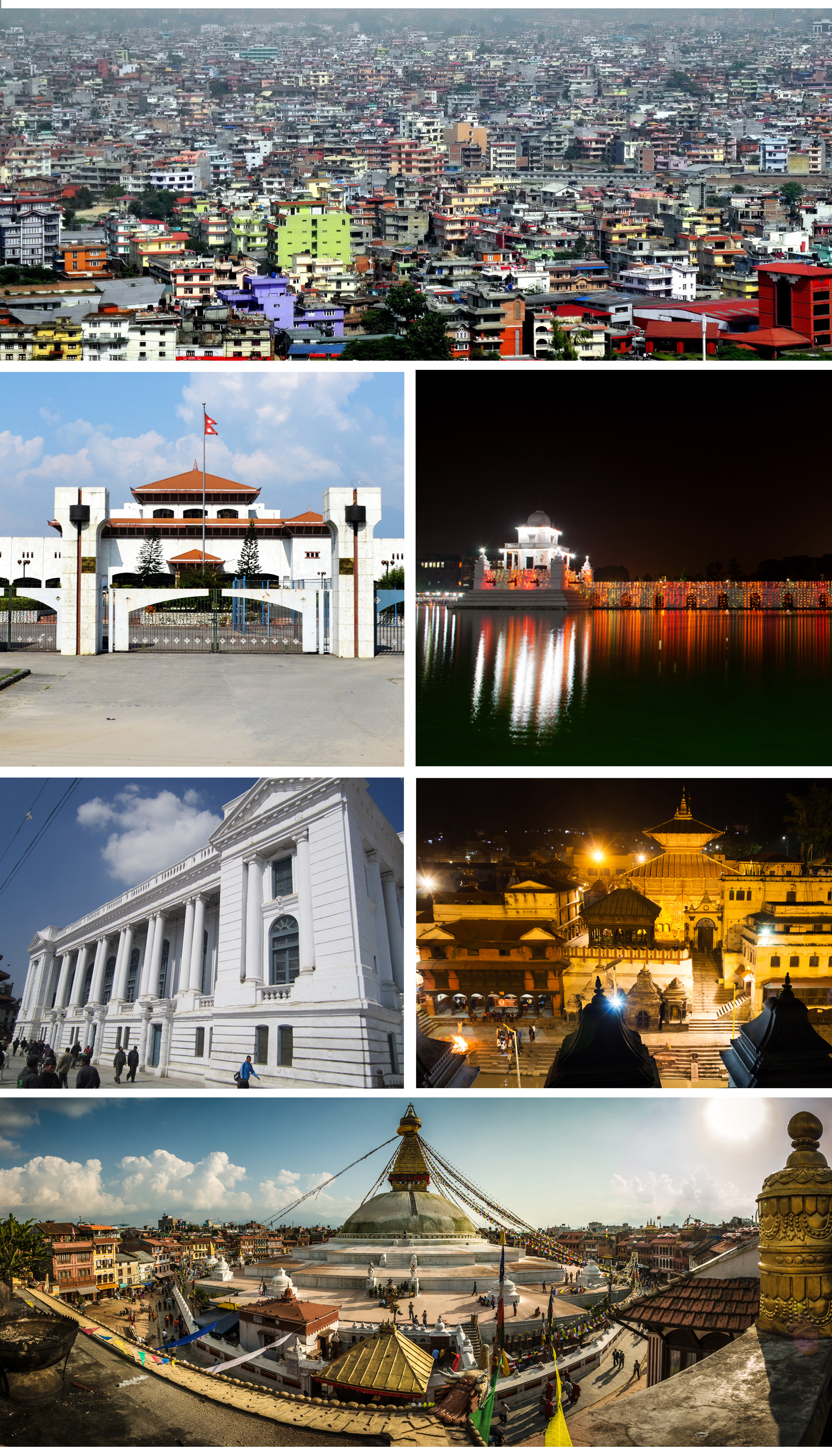
Kathmandu Metropolis

Kathmandu is the biggest economic hub of Nepal. Most of the offices and industries of Nepal are in Kathmandu. People from all over Nepal come to Kathmandu for better education, health services, job opportunities and social security. The major economic hubs are New Road, Durbar Marg, Putalisadak, and Asan. The district's activities include the production of handicrafts, artworks, garments, pashmina and paper. Some artisan output is marketed as a fair trade product, for example handmade soft toys marketed through the charity Oxfam.

Tourism is one of the main industries of the district and Kathmandu has the highest number of tourists coming into the country. Hindu and Buddhist pilgrims from all over the world visit various religious places located in the district such as Pashupatinath, Swayambhunath, Boudhanath, and Buddhanilkantha, while Freak Street and Thamel are noted tourist destinations for Western tourists.

== Education ==
Kathmandu district is the pioneer district in education in many aspects in Nepal. Durbar High School (the first school of Nepal), Trichandra College (the first college of Nepal), Padma Kanya College (the first women's college) are all located in Kathmandu city. Tribhuwan University, the first university of Nepal, is located in Kirtipur municipality of Kathmandu district. Besides these, thousands of educational institutions are located in the district which enrolls students from Nepal, India, Bangladesh etc.

== Administration ==
The district consists of 10 Municipalities and 1 Metrocity. These are as follows:

Rank	Name	Population (2021)	Area (km^{2})	Density (/km^{2})	Major Neighbourhoods and Towns
1	Kathmandu Metropolitan City	845,767	49.45	17,103	New Road of Kathmandu, Thamel, Durbar Marg, Baluwatar, Samakhushi, Chabahil, Baneshwor, Koteshwor, Pepsicola, Sinamangal
2	Budhanilkantha	179,688	34.8	5,163	Kapan, Sukedhara, Golfutar, Mandikhatar, Hattigauda, Budhanilkantha
3	Tarakeshwar	151,508	54.95	2,757	Kavresthali, Dharmasthali, Manamaiju, Goldhunga
4	Gokarneshwar	151,200	58.5	2,585	Jorpati, Nayabasti, Gokarna
5	Chandragiri	136,928	43.9	3,119	Naikap, Balambu, Satungal, Machhegaun, Dahachock, Thankot, Matatirtha, Nagdhunga
6	Tokha	135,741	17.11	7,933	Gonggabu, Dhapasi, Tokha
7	Kageshwari-Manohara	133,327	27.38	4,870	Kadaghari, Gothatar, Thali, Danchhi
8	Nagarjun	115,507	29.85	3,870	Kalanki, Syuchatar, Sitapaila
9	Kirtipur	81,782	14.76	5,541	Kirtipur
10	Dakshinkali	26,372	42.68	618	Dakshinkali
11	Shankharapur	29,318	60.21	487	Sankhu

== Demographics ==
Historical population
Census year	Pop.	±% p.a.
1981	422,237	—
1991	675,341	+4.81%
2001	1,081,845	+4.82%
2011	1,744,240	+4.89%
2021	2,041,587	+1.59%
Source: Citypopulation

At the time of the 2021 Nepal census, Kathmandu District had a population of 2,041,587. 5.65% of the population is under 5 years of age. It has a literacy rate of 89.23% and a sex ratio of 971 females per 1000 males. The entire population lived in municipalities.

Castes/ethnic groups in Kathmandu District (2021)
1. Bahun (22.0%)
2. Chhetri (20.8%)
3. Newar (19.2%)
4. Tamang (12.0%)
5. Magar (4.55%)
6. Gurung (2.54%)
7. Rai (2.31%)
8. Kami (1.67%)
9. Sherpa (1.55%)
10. Damai (1.17%)
11. Thakuri (1.12%)
12. Tharu (1.07%)
13. Other Hill Janjati (2.98%)
14. Madheshi non-Dalit (2.69%)
15. Others (4.41%)

Population-wise Bahun (Hill Brahmin), Chhetri, Newar, Tamang and Magars are the top 5 prominent ethnic and caste in Kathmandu district

Languages of Kathmandu district (2021)
1. Nepali (61.1%)
2. Nepal Bhasha (15.1%)
3. Tamang (9.62%)
4. Magar (2.08%)
5. Maithili (1.91%)
6. Bhojpuri (1.49%)
7. Gurung (1.35%)
8. Sherpa (1.33%)
9. Rai (1.00%)
10. Others (5.07%)

At the time of the 2021 census, 61.07% of the population had as their mother tongue Nepali, 15.08% Nepal Bhasha, 9.62% Tamang, 2.08% Magar, 1.91% Maithili, 1.49% Bhojpuri, 1.35% Gurung, 1.33% Sherpa and 1.00% Rai. In 2011, 62.6% of the population spoke Nepali as their first language.

Religion in Kathmandu District (2021)
Religion	Percent
Hinduism	78.49%
Buddhism	16.28%
Christianity	2.36%
Kirat Mundhum	1.43%
Islam	1.29%
Other or not stated	0.15%

== Hospitals ==
- Bir Hospital
- Tribhuvan University Teaching Hospital
- Chhetrapati Free Hospital (Chhetrapati Nishulka Chikitsalaya)
- Babukaji Memorial Hospital
- Gangalal Hridaya Kendra
- Manmohan Memorial Hospital
- Tilganga Eye Hospital

== See also ==
- Zones of Nepal (Former)
- Kathmandu Metropolitan City
- Kathmandu Valley
- Kathmandu
- Kirtipur
- Sanglekhola
- Pasikot
