= Nepal Scouts =

National Scout Organisation of Nepal

Nepal scout
- नेपाल स्काउट [Nepal Scouts]
- Headquarters: Post Box no 1037
- Location: Leknath Marg, Lainchaur, Kathmandu
- Country: Nepal
- Membership: 109000+
- Patron: Prime Minister of Nepal
- Chief Commissioner: Santosh Kumar Thapa
- Director (Chief Executive)
- Website www.nepalscouts.org

Rover	Ranger

The "Nepal Scouts" ("नेपाल स्काउट") is the national Scouting and Guiding organization of Nepal, founded in Nepal in 1952. It became a member of the World Organization of the Scout Movement in 1969 and later became a member of the World Association of Girl Guides and Girl Scouts in 1984.

As of 2024 the membership of Nepal Scouts is 109,000+.

== History ==
During 1950s, The Nepal Scouts and Guides Association, established by His Majesty King Tribhuvan Bir Bikram Shah Dev in 1952, has a rich history. In 1959, His Royal Highness Crown Prince Birendra Bir Bikram Shah Dev was appointed Chief Scout by King Mahendra Bir Bikram Shah Dev, marking the beginning of a tradition of celebrating Scout Day at the Royal Palace. Over the years, the association underwent name changes, eventually becoming the Nepal Scouts in 1975. Despite political changes, the association adapted, with the constitution now defining the Prime Minister as the Patron and the Youth and Sports Minister as the Chief Scout. The Nepal Scouts has embraced development plans and held its first National Jamboree in 1987. Today, it continues to promote leadership, community service, and youth development through various programs and activities.

In 2007, as part of the centenary of Scouting, Nepal renamed Urkema Peak in the Himalayas to Baden-Powell Peak.

== Program ==
Nepal Scout Programs focus under the guidance of program officer Saru Gosai and Assistant Youth Program officer Sonu Bhandari on various fields like handicrafts, hiking, camping, nature conservation and community development. Service activities include adult literacy campaigns, food production, child vaccination and drug abuse education. Relief operations are mobilized during earthquakes, floods, landslides, fires and other natural disasters. Nepal Scouts have an age based youth program to involve young people in different activities. Currently there are four different age section namely; Cub/Brownie Scout Section (6-10 years old), Boy/Girl Scout Section (11-15 years old), Girl/Boy Venture Scout Section (16-19 years old) and Rover/Ranger Scout Section (16-25 years old).

== Activities ==
Scout activities are organized for both boys and girls jointly; but training, camping and other aspects of the program are conducted separately.

Under the national education system, university students pursuing the master's level are required to serve in a village for a year. These students are given an orientation that includes Scout training.

=== National jamborees ===
The first national jamboree of the Nepal Scouts was organized in 1987 at Kirtipur.

The second national jamboree was organized in 2013 at Tikauli of Chitwan District (after almost 26 years) and was themed Peace and Harmony.

The Third National Scout Jamboree was held on May 30 to 4 June, 2018 at Kakani International Scouts Center, Nuwakot.

=== Rover Moot ===
The First Ever Rover Moot of Nepal Scouts was held in 2019 at Pokhara. PM K. P. Sharma Oli inaugurates the Rover Moot with the presence of 4000 Rover and Ranger Scouts from 11 different countries.

== Training centres ==
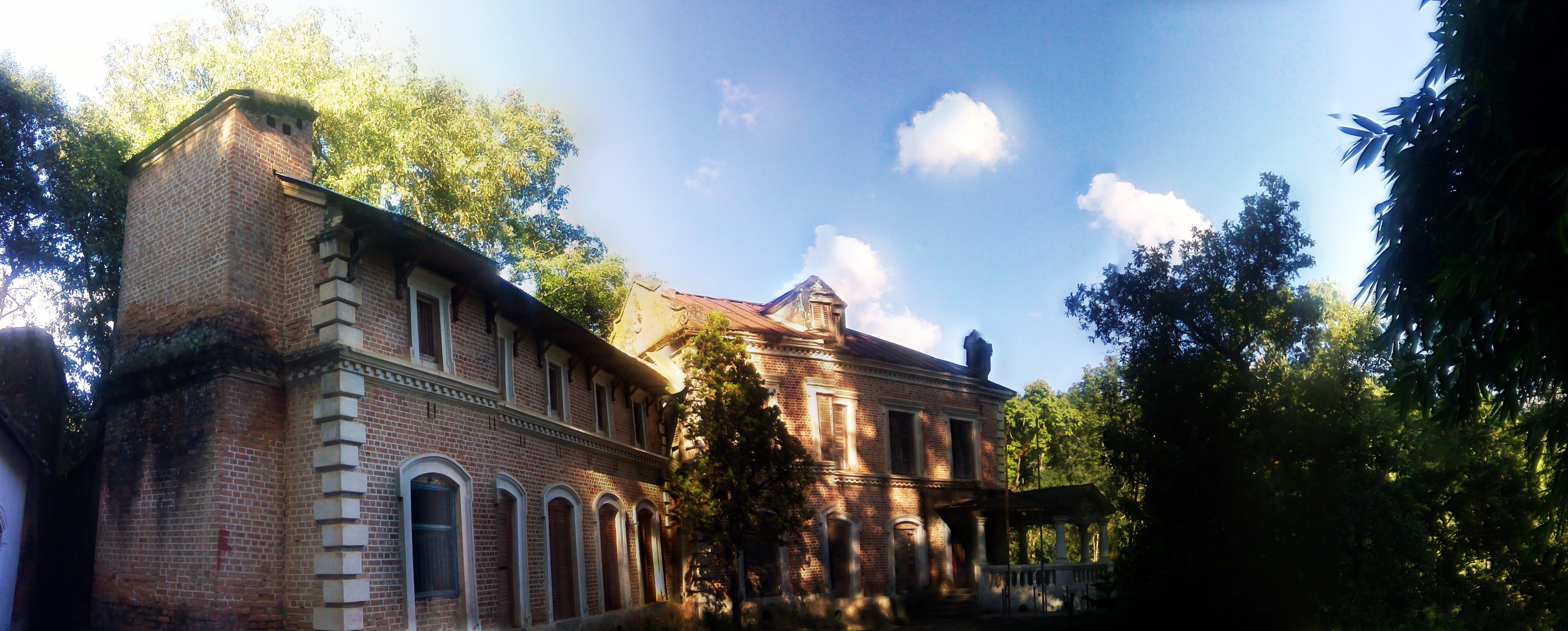
Panoramic view of Nepal Scout National Training Center at Sundarijal, Kathmandu

The Nepal Scouts has its National Training Center at Sundarijal, Kathmandu. The International training center is situated at Kakani, Nuwakot District.

== Scout Motto ==
- Cubs: सक्दो कोशिस गर Sakdo Kosis Gara (Do Your Best)
- Scouts: तयार होऊ Tayar Hou (Be Prepared)
- Rovers: सेवा Sewa (Service)

== Emblem ==
The membership badge of the Nepal Scouts incorporates elements of the flag of Nepal, and both the trefoil to represent the girls and the fleur-de-lis to represent the boys, as well as the founding date in both Western and Nepali calendars.

The highest rank in scout level was "King's Badge" however, after the monarchy ended in 2007 the new highest rank in scout level is "President Scout" but this rank is not yet awarded to anyone.

== International Scouting units in Nepal ==
Nepal has active expatriate Scout groups, including the American Boy Scouts in Kathmandu, the Direct Service Pack, and Troop 900. These are sponsored by the Lincoln School and linked to the Direct Service branch of the Boy Scouts of America, which supports units around the world.
