= Baluwa =

Baluwa may refer to:

- Baluwa, Kathmandu
- Baluwa, Kavrepalanchok
- Baluwa, Salyan
