= Nepal Medical College =

Medical school in Kathmandu

- नेपाल मेडिकल कलेज
- Motto: Education – Research – Service
- Type: Private university
- Established: 1997; 29 years ago
- Founders: Sachey Kumar Pahari, Anjani Kr. Sharma
- Affiliations: Kathmandu University
- Chairman: Prof. Dr. Jainuddin Ansari
- Principal: Prof. Dr. Moda Nath Marhatta
- Location: Attarkhel, Gokarneshwor-8, Kathmandu, Nepal
- Campus: Urban
- Website: www.nmcth.edu
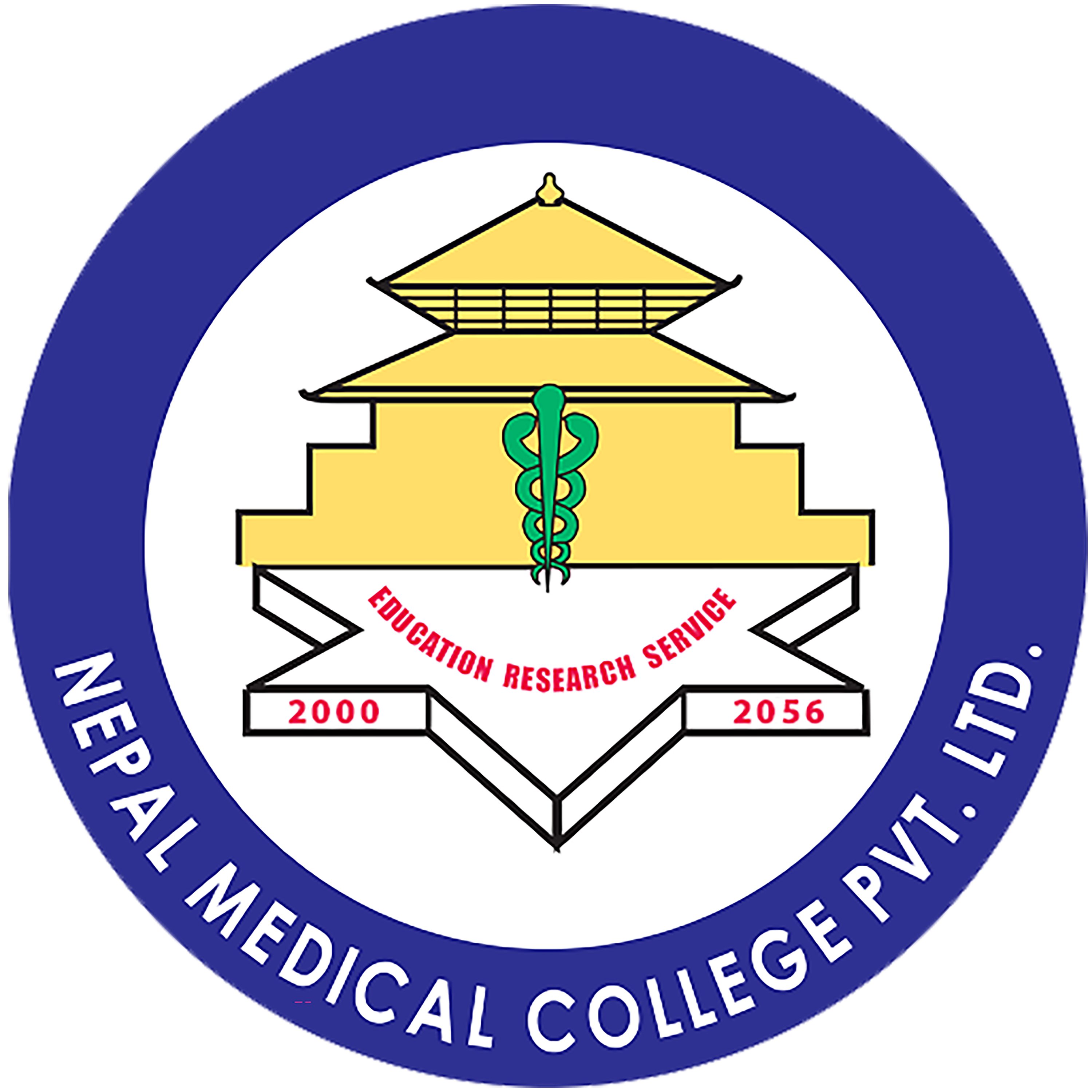

Nepal Medical College Teaching Hospital (NMCTH) Teaching Hospital institution in Kathmandu, Nepal established in 1997 by the late Sachey Kumar Pahari. NMC provides medical care and provides medical education in Nepal. Nepal Medical College is located in Jorpati, Kathmandu.

Nepal medical college is an institution affiliated to Kathmandu University. Kathmandu University (KU) is an autonomous, not-for-profit, self-funding public institution established by an Act of Parliament in December 1991 and is listed in World Directory of Medical Schools. It was also listed in the now discontinued International Medical Education Directory (IMED).

Nepal Medical Colleges Pvt. Ltd (NMC) is situated at Attarkhel of Jorpati Village Development Committee, in Kathmandu, about 11 km. northeast of Kathmandu city. It lies at the foot hill of a mound. It has a quiet and tranquil environment, required of a medical college and a teaching hospital. The Gokarna hillock with pine trees, about half a kilometer away on the north, the Gokarna Safari Park across Bagmati river about one kilometer in the east, the terraces with trees encircling the NMC campus on the west, the NMC campus which comprises the college and Nepal Medical College Teaching Hospital (NMCTH), has access to the main road through its main entrance on the southwest.

The NMC campus houses the academic buildings, library, female student and male student hostels and Nepal Medical College Teaching Hospital (NMCTH). The college has departments of Clinical Biochemistry, Clinical pharmacology, Clinical Physiology, Community Medicine, Forensic Medicine, Human Anatomy, Medical Microbiology and Pathology that are required for the first two academic years of the MBBS curriculum.

== Notable alumni ==
- Ojashwi Sherchan, former Biochemistry professor of the college and present MP from Rastriya Swatantra Party

== See also ==
- Kathmandu University
- Nepal Medical Council
- Tribhuvan University
