= Helambu =

Region of villages in Nepal

Coordinates: 28.0188°N 85.5253°E

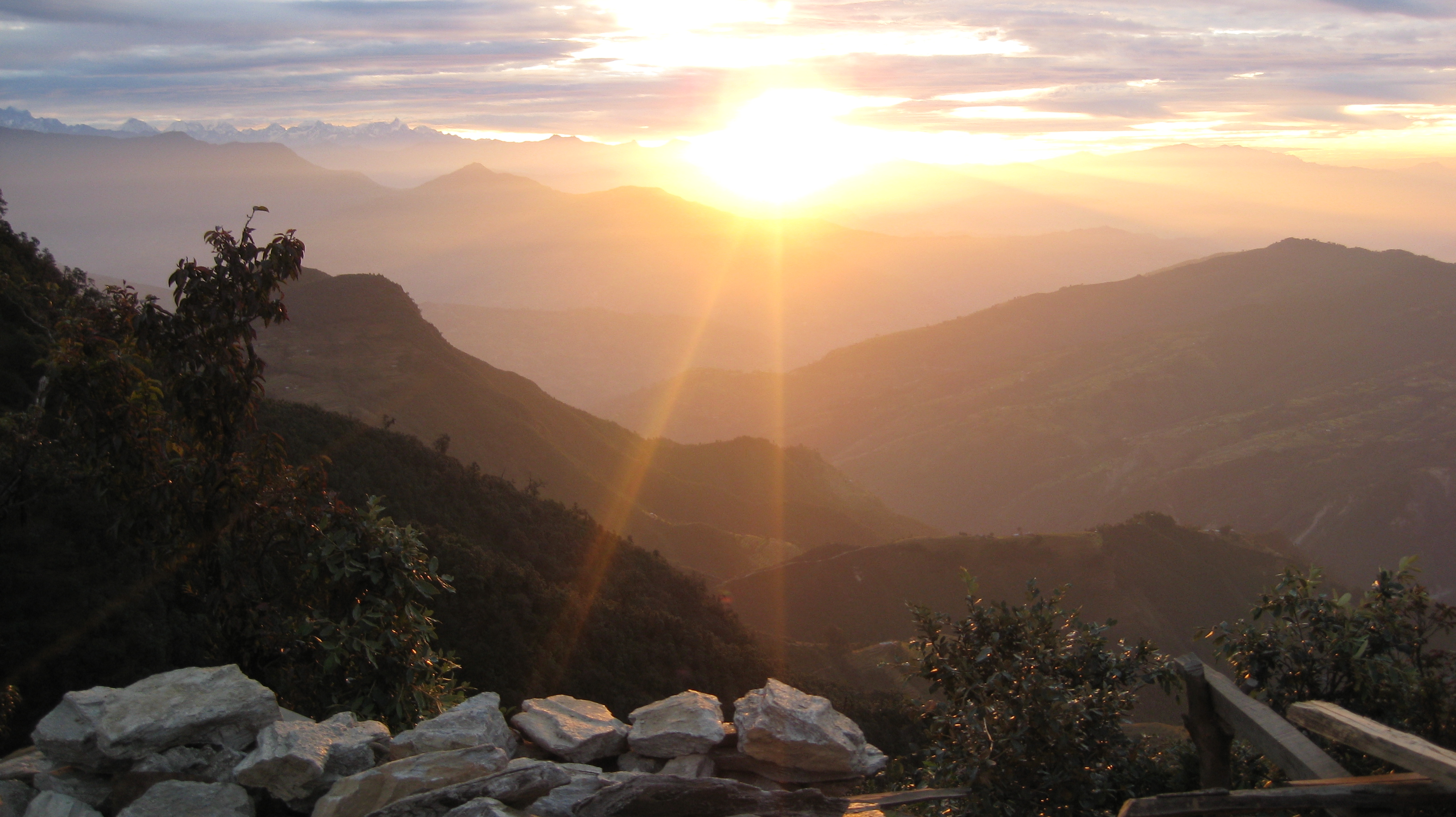
Sunset view from Helambu

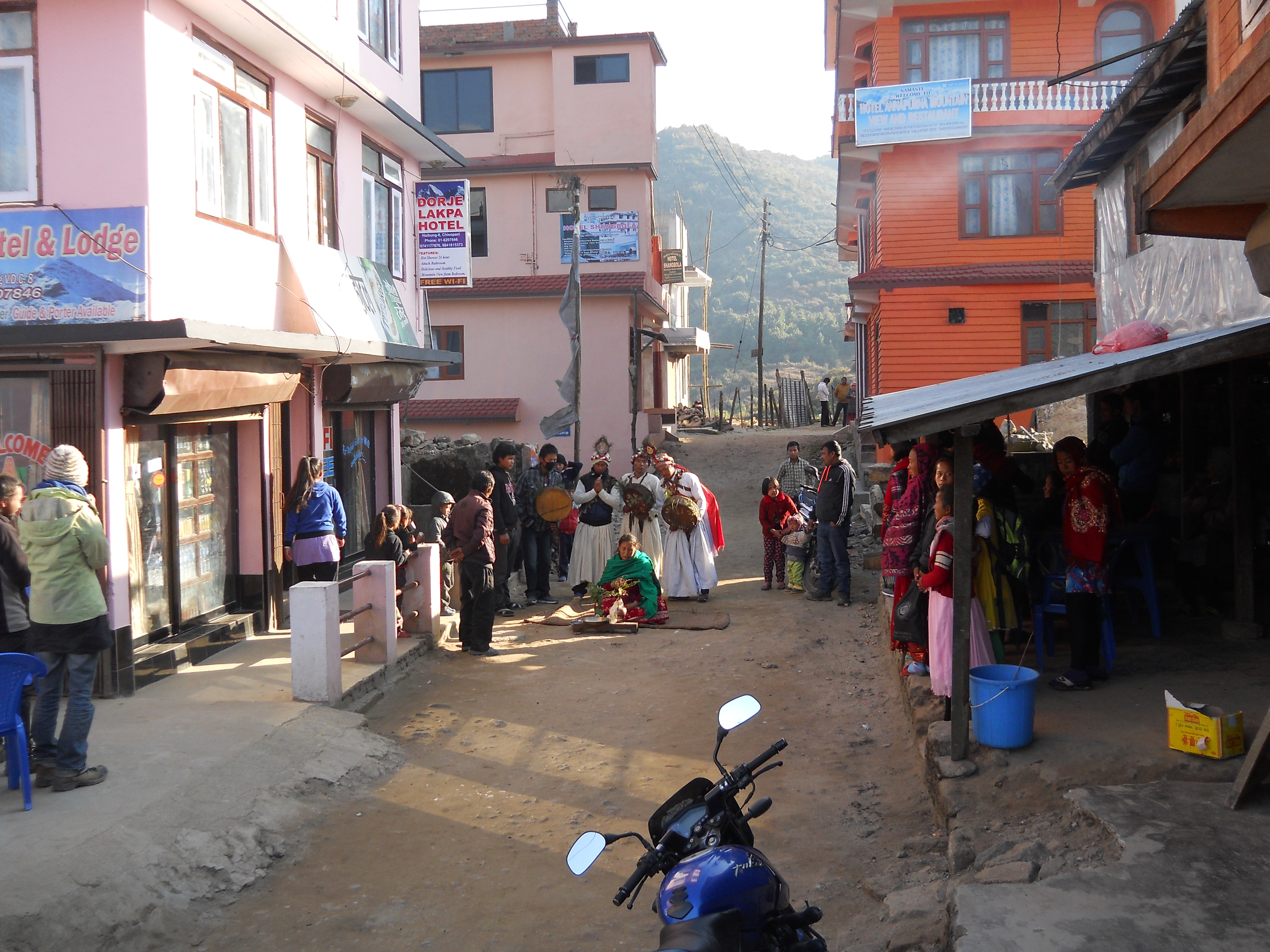
Chisapani Helambu

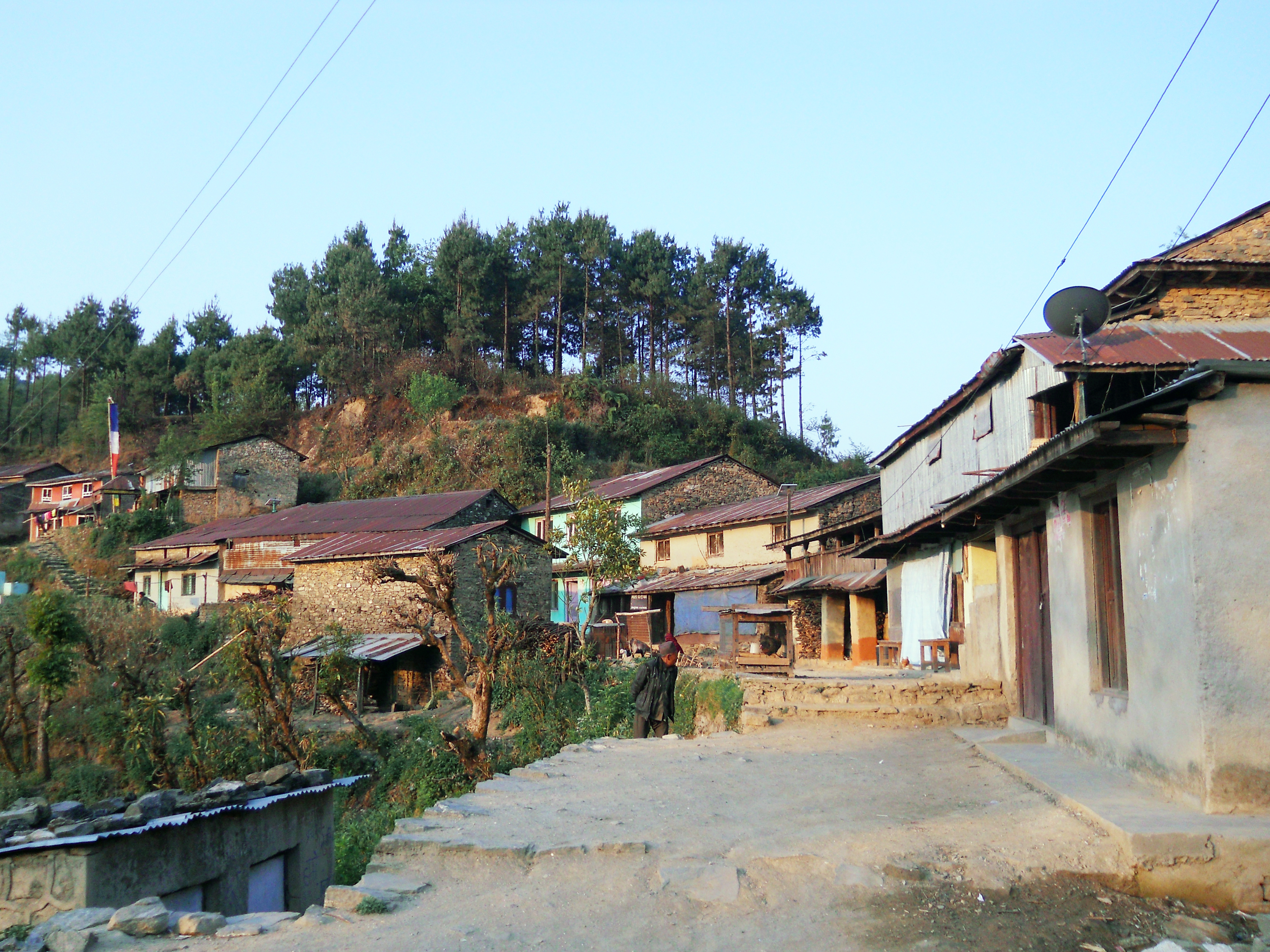
Helambu GolBhanjhyang

Helambu is a region of highland villages in Nepal, about 80 km from Kathmandu. It is the home of the Hyolmo people. The word Yolmo derives from the word Helambu. The Helambu region begins at the Lauribina La pass and descends to the Melamchi valley. Helambu is famous for its sweet apples and artistic Buddhist monasteries and it is a Buddhist pilgrimage site.

Several trekking routes visit Helambu, one of them being known as Helambu Trek.

== Helambu Trek ==
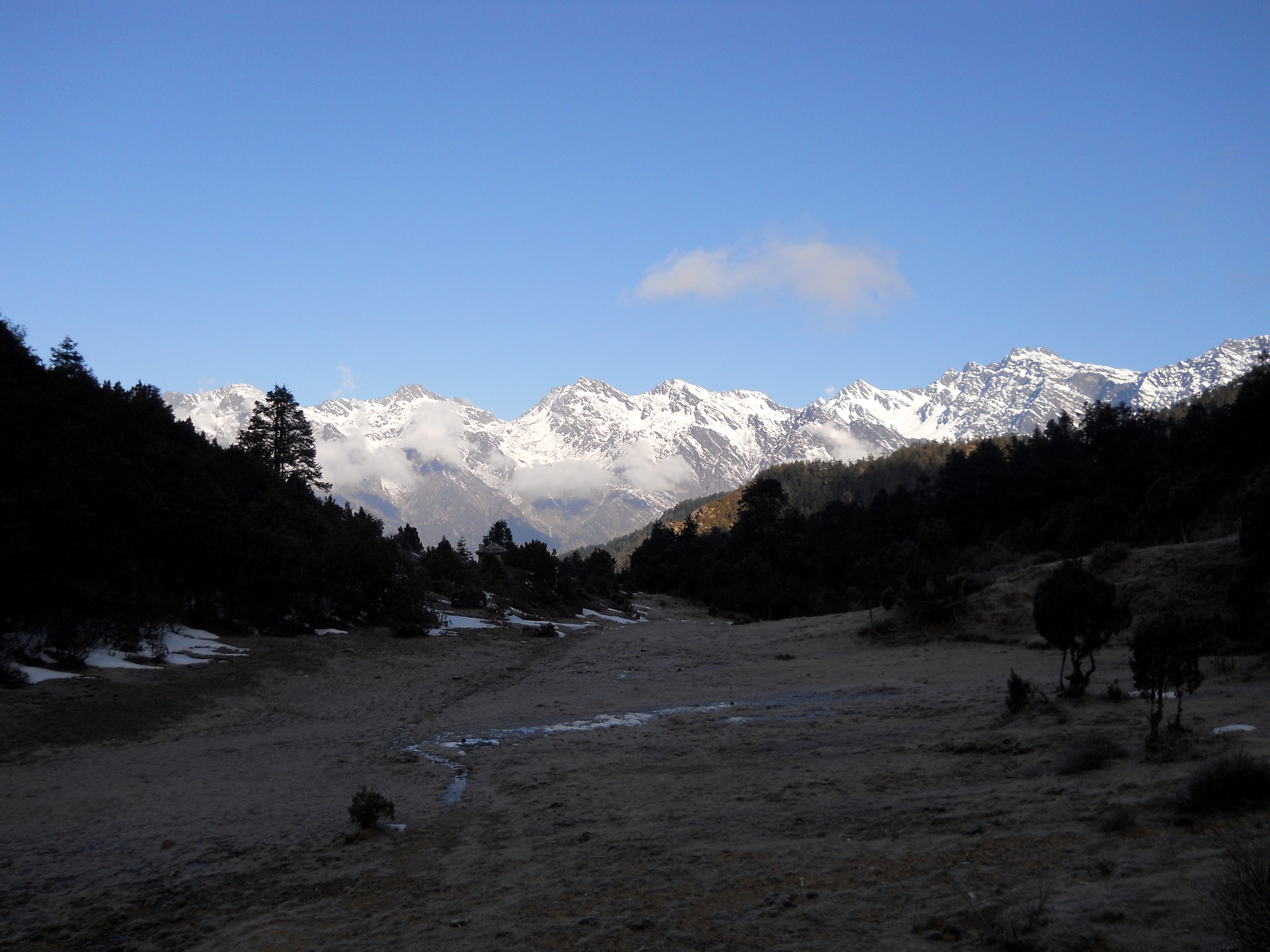
MaginGoth Helambu

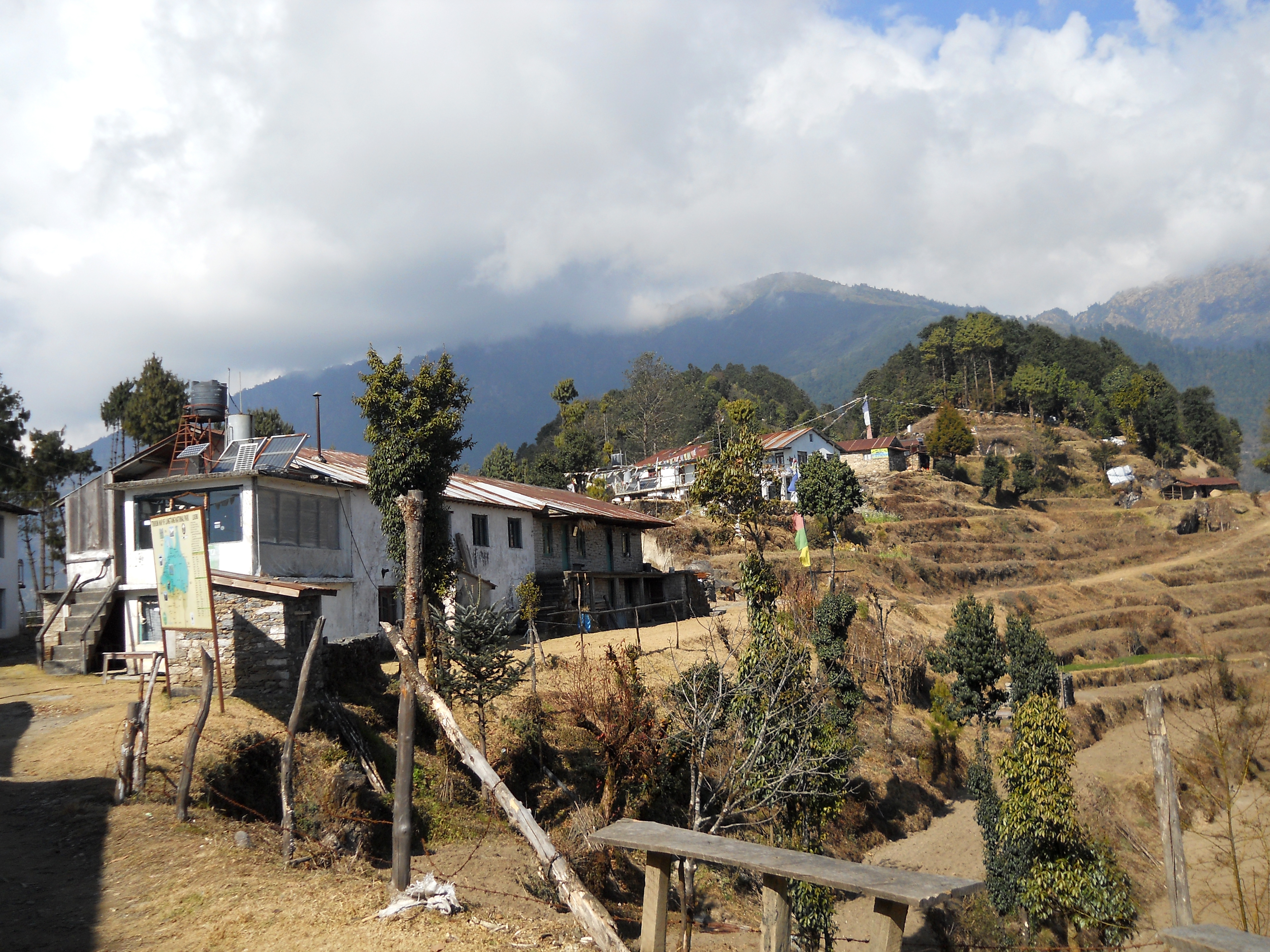
Kutumsang Helambu

This is a good trek for people who don't have much time in Nepal. It is an 8-day long trek which starts in Kathmandu itself, but can be completed in as little as 5–6 days. The normal trailhead starts off at Sundarijal and goes past Chisopani, Hyolmo, Kutumsang, Magin Goth, Tharepati, Malemchigaun, Nakote and Hyolmo, Tarke Gyang. After which you have the option of two roads one is the footpath via Sermathang or the bus route via Kiul Takpa Kharka Kashye. Both ways ultimately meet at Melemchi where you can take a bus back to Kathmandu. Another variation is the reverse of this trek. The maximum height reached during the trek is about 3650 m.

The trek starts from Sundarijal (1,390 m (4,560 ft)), a small dam and hydroelectric station in the north-east corner of Kathmandu Valley where the Himalayan Rescue Dog squad is headquartered. The trails begins west of Sundarijal at the end of the auto road where the large water pipe comes out of the hills. There is now bus service to Sundarijal from Boudhanath. A taxi can also be hired or you can walk. There is now daily jeep service from Sundarijal to Pati Bhanjyang. To walk begin at the bus park in Sundarijal and the large water pipe. Cross under the pipe and proceed along its west side much of the way is up stairs, continue. eventually turning left to cross over the dam of a water reservoir (1,585 m (5,200 ft)) in 40 minutes. Across the dam continue uphill crossing the water shed management road which winds around the hillside There is Lodge near here. Climb through wet sub tropical forest to an oak forest and on to Mulkharkha (1,896 m; 6,220 ft), in an hour. This is a scattered Tamang village with lodges and view of Kathmandu Valley behind you. Don't walk the next area alone, as there have been rare instances of attacks north of Mulkharkha. The trail continues up, first in open country and then in oak forest, often in small gully, and enters shivapuri watershed and wild life Research area, after passing an army station. The trails ascends to a pass Burlang Bhanjyang (8,000 ft; 2,400 m) with houses and lodges and below it on the north side in 2 hours. This pass marks the Shivapuri ridges of the Kathmandu Valley's rim. The trails descends through a pleasant oak forest, past some houses and lodge on the left, Chisapani (7,200 ft; 2,200 m), meaning ‘’cold water’’, to a flat portion where another trail joins from the right and a road crosses Ina clear weather there are good view of the Himalaya to the north and in the spring rhododendrons bloom. The trail continues to descend through open farmland to reach Pati Bhanjyan (5,800 ft; 1,800 m), sitting in a saddle 13/4 hours from the Burlung Bhanjyang, There are lodges and a police check post here. From here there are two routes. One continues along the general ridge system heading north and eventually descend east to the Sherpa village of Melamchi Ghyanng. The other heads east, descends to the Melamchi Khola and proceeds up its east (left) bank towards Tarke Ghyang, situated opposite Melamchighyang on the east side of river. The ridge route goes much higher (almost to 3,700 m (12,000 ft)) than the other route and other may be snow on its upper portions in the late winter or early spring. There are no permanent villages between Khutumsang and Melamchi Ghyang on this route, but leaving Khutumsang in the morning reach tharepati, where there are lodges. This is the part of the route that offers excellent views of the mountains. If it is cloudy which often happens late in the day, consider spending a night up high in a seasonal lodge or hopping for views in tharepati, then hope for good views the next morning. The circuit to the north along the ridge and the return via the east side of the Melamchi Khola Valley is described but if their weather is bad it is wise to head up the east side of the Melamchi Khola and when conditions have improved to return via the high route. In this case we follow the direction in reverse.

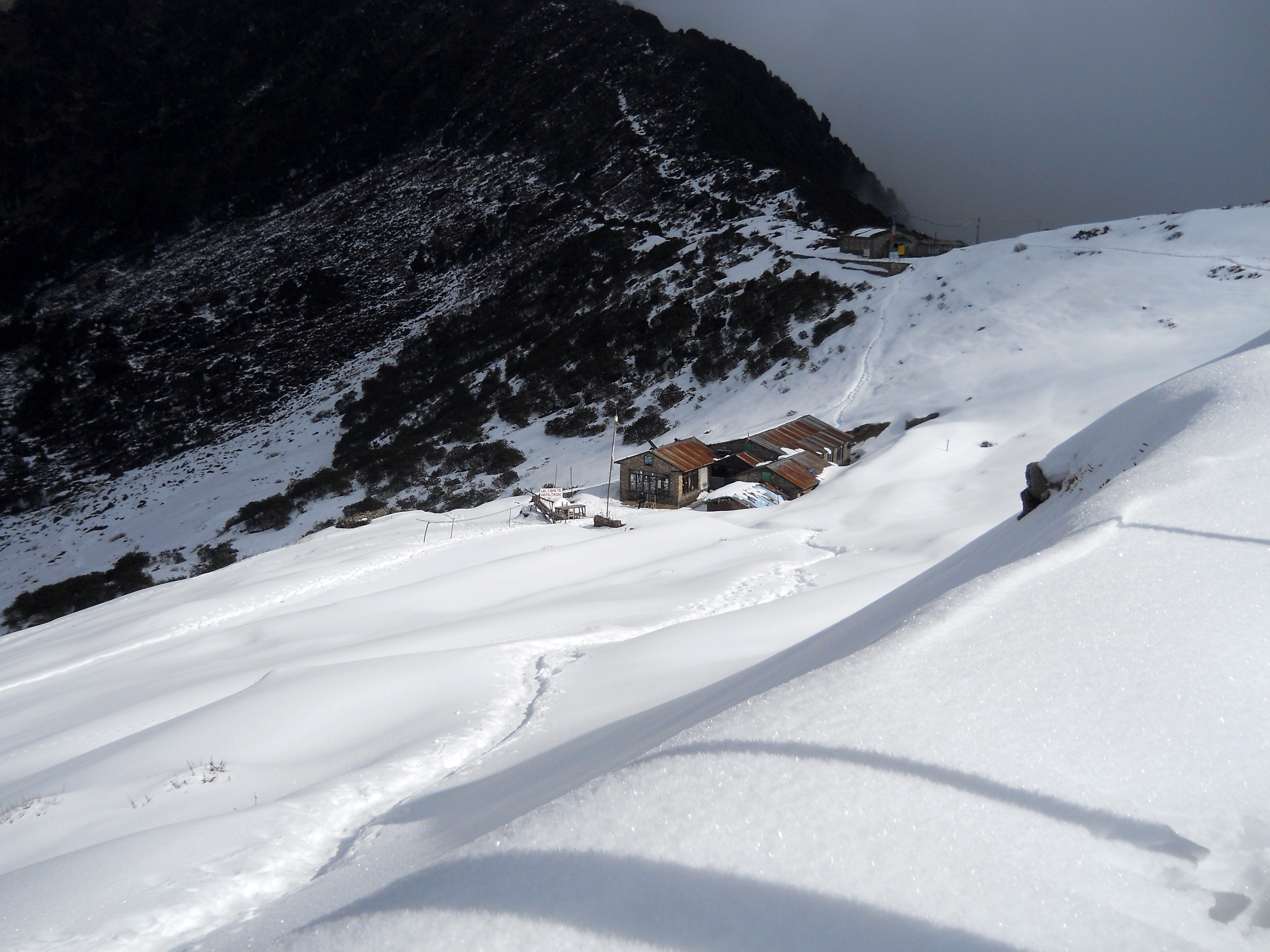
Tharepati Helambu

== Route ==
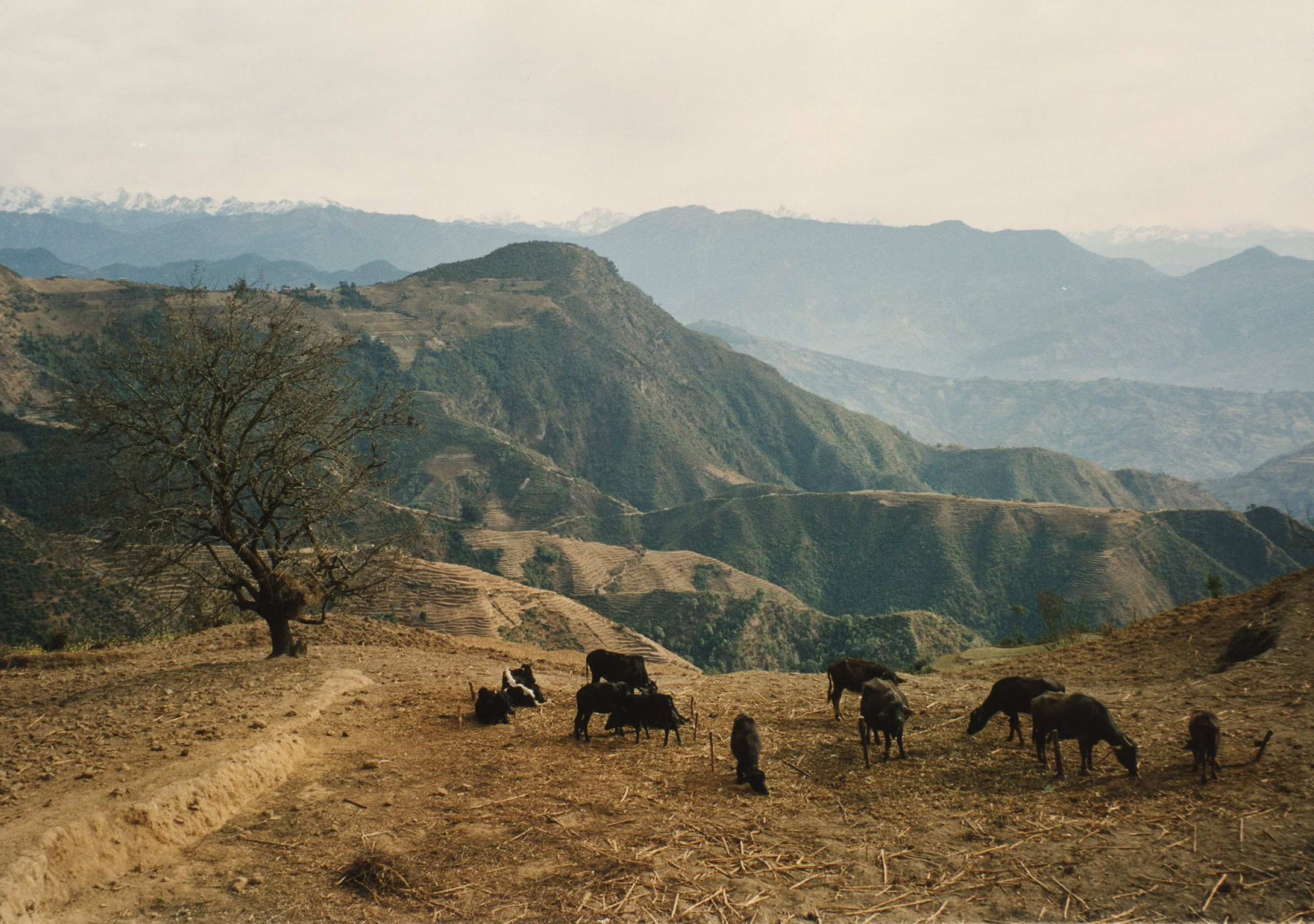
Near Chipling, 2150 m

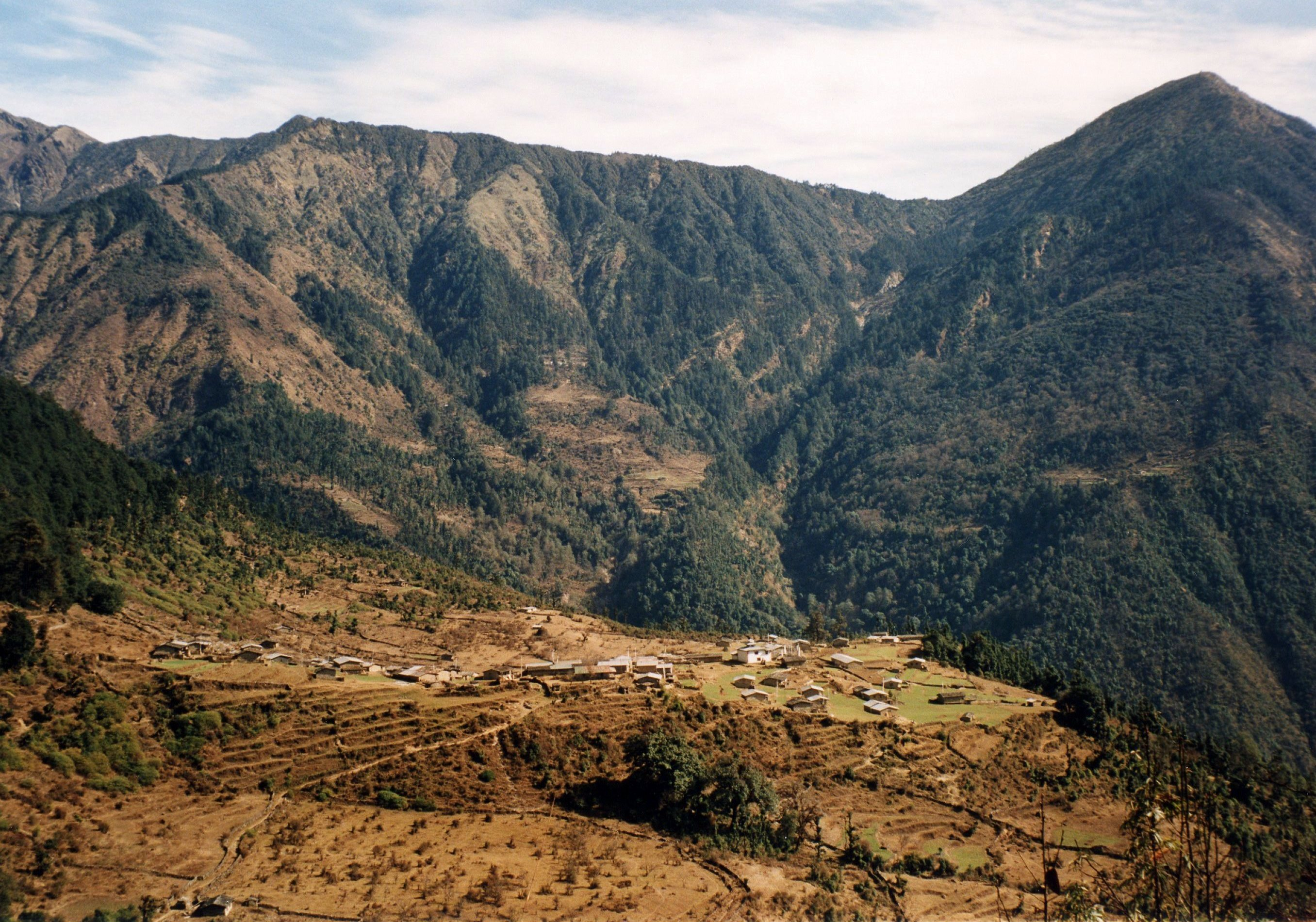
Malemchigaon, 2591 m

The trek takes place in the Sherpa Helambu region, around 72 kilometers Northeast of Kathmandu. A roundabout circuit is used, most often starting at Sundarijal, although other starting positions include Nagarkot, Kakani or Sankhu.

Pati Bhanjyan, Chipling, Khutumsang and Tharepati are amongst the first villages to be passed, followed by Malemchigaon, Nakote and Tarke Gyang. Two possible routes are available from Tarke Gyang, one to complete the trek and another that leads to the Arniko Highway, the main thoroughfare out of Kathmandu leading to Tibet.

To complete the trek one would proceed to Taramarang following on to Pati Bhanjyan. From Pati Bhanjyan the trek returns to the starting point of Sundarijal, a route that takes around seven days.
