= Gokarneshwor =

Municipality in Kathmandu District, Nepal

Gokarneshwor गोकर्णेश्वर
- Municipality (नगरपालिका)
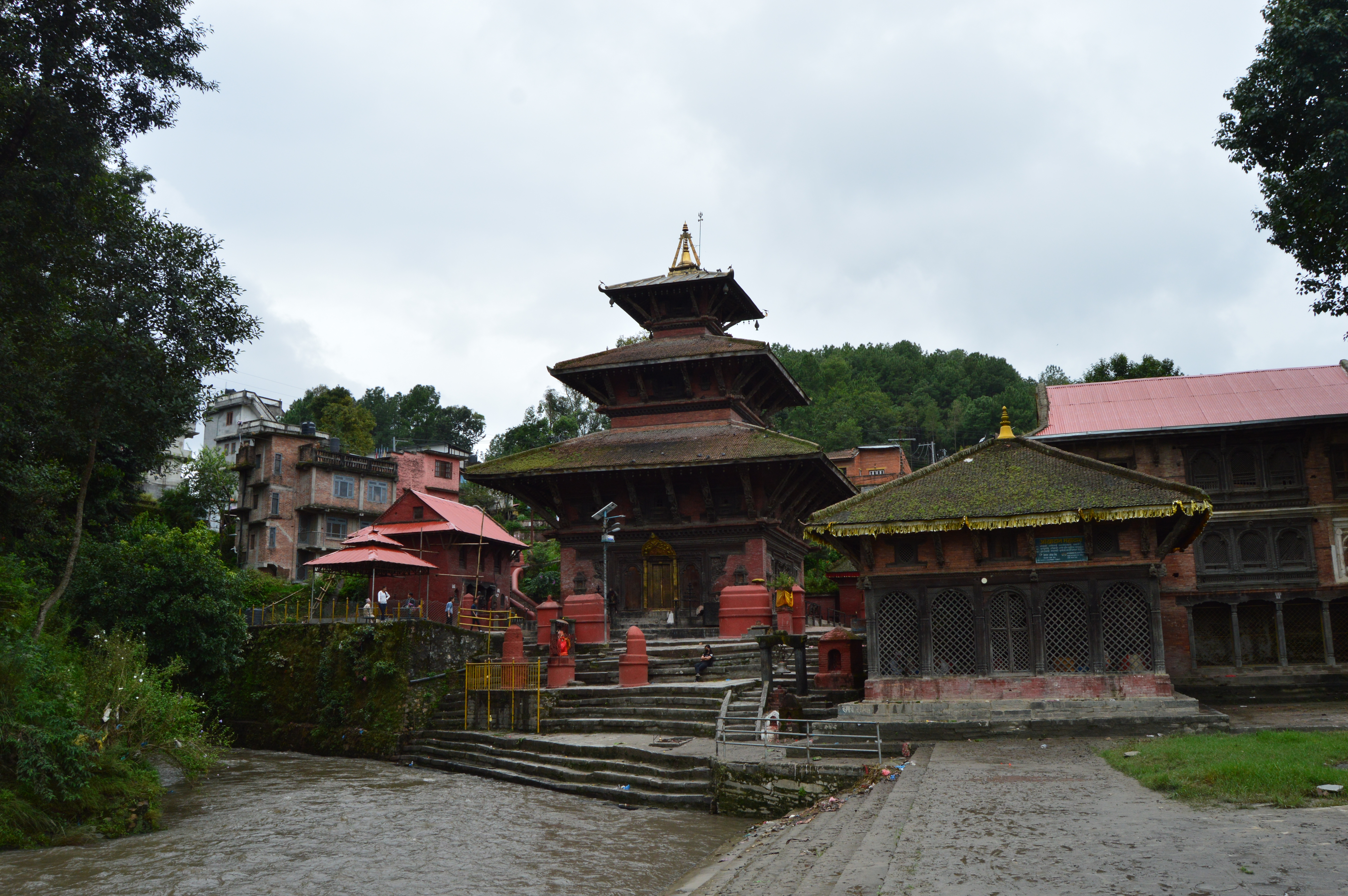
- Gokarna Mahadev Temple

- Location in Nepal Gokarneshwor (Nepal)
- Coordinates: 27°44′0″N 85°23′0″E
- Country: Nepal
- Province: Bagmati
- District: Kathmandu
- Established: 2014
- Named for: Gokarneshwor Mahadev Temple

Government
  - Mayor: Deepak Kumar Risal (NC)
  - Deputy Mayor: Sannani Lama (CPN-UML)

Area
  - Total: 58.5 km^{2} (22.6 sq mi)

Population (2021 Nepal census)
  - Total: 149,366
  - Density: 2,550/km^{2} (6,610/sq mi)
  - Ethnicities: Newar Hyolmo Sherpa Rai Limbu Gurung Brahman Chhetri Tamang Magar
- Time zone: UTC+5:45 (NST)
- Website: gokarneshwormun.gov.np

Gokarneshwor is a municipality in Kathmandu District in the Bagmati Province of Nepal that was established on 2 December 2014 by merging the former Village development committees Sundarijal, Nayapati, Baluwa, Jorpati and Gokarna. The office of the municipality is that of the former Jorpati village development committee. The river Bagmati has its origin as the name Bagh Dwar situated in the middle of the Shivapuri jungle in this municipality.

In the village on the banks of the Bagmati River stands the Gokarna Mahadev temple, built in 1582. There also lies the Kanti Bhairav temple, built in around 17th century during the reign of King Pratap Malla. In late August or early September people go to this temple to bathe and make offerings in honor of their fathers, living or dead, on a day called Gokarna Aunsi.

The Gokarna Forest Reserve is located in the area. Nepal Medical College and Teaching Hospital is located Southwest of Gokarneshwor.

== Toponymy ==
=== Linguistic origin ===
- Linguistic family: Indoeuropean
- Language: Sanskrit

=== Etymology ===
“Gokarna” comes from Sanskrit, composed of “go” (cow) and “karna” (ear), meaning “cow’s ear.” “Ishwor” means god or lord. Therefore, Gokarneshwor is interpreted as “the Lord with cow’s ears,” an epithet of Shiva, and refers to the temple of Gokarneshwor Mahadev.

Go (गो) means “cow” and comes from Sanskrit go (गो) meaning cow, cattle. Karna (कर्ण) means “ear” and comes from Sanskrit karṇa (कर्ण) meaning ear. Ishwor / Ishvara (ईश्वर) means “lord, god” and comes from Sanskrit ईश्वर (īśvara) meaning supreme lord, deity. The toponym Gokarneshwor is a Sanskrit compound meaning “the Lord with cow’s ears,” one of the names of Shiva, directly linked to the famous Gokarna temple near Kathmandu.

== Schools ==
Some of the well renowned schools in the municipality are Young Hearts Boarding High school, East-Pole Higher Secondary School, Aakashdeep English School, Shangri-la Public School, Gokarneshwor Mahadev English Secondary School, Saraswati Secondary School, Manakamana Secondary School, Bouddha International School, Venus Public School, Nava Arunima School, Eyelens English School HIMS school and Timeline School. The municipality has large number of educational institutions in the nation, trailing just behind Kathmandu Mahanagarpalika.

== Population ==
The municipality has a total population of 107,351 according to 2011 Nepal census. At the time of the 2011 Nepal census the village had a population of 7,508 with 1,768 households. The population of the municipality grew to 149,366 at the 2021 Nepal census. Around 99.4% of the residents are Nepali citizens and 85.5% are literate.

== Settlements ==
Jorpati, Nayabasti, Bensigaun, Attarkhel, Narayantar, Dakshindhoka, Jagdol, Gokarna, Shankhadol, Sundarijal, Nayapati are the settlement areas of local people within that area.

== Notable residents ==
Writer Ramesh Bikal was born near Gokarna in 1932.

== Gallery ==
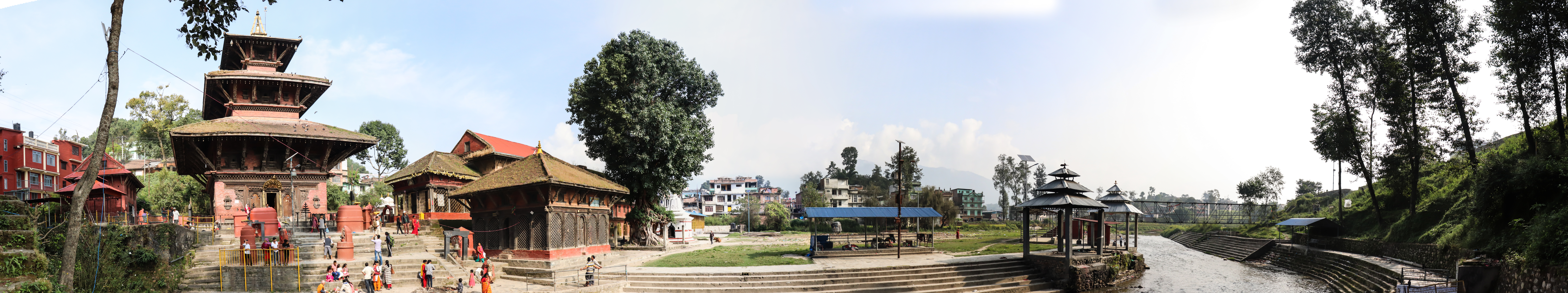
A panoramic view of Gokarna Mahadev

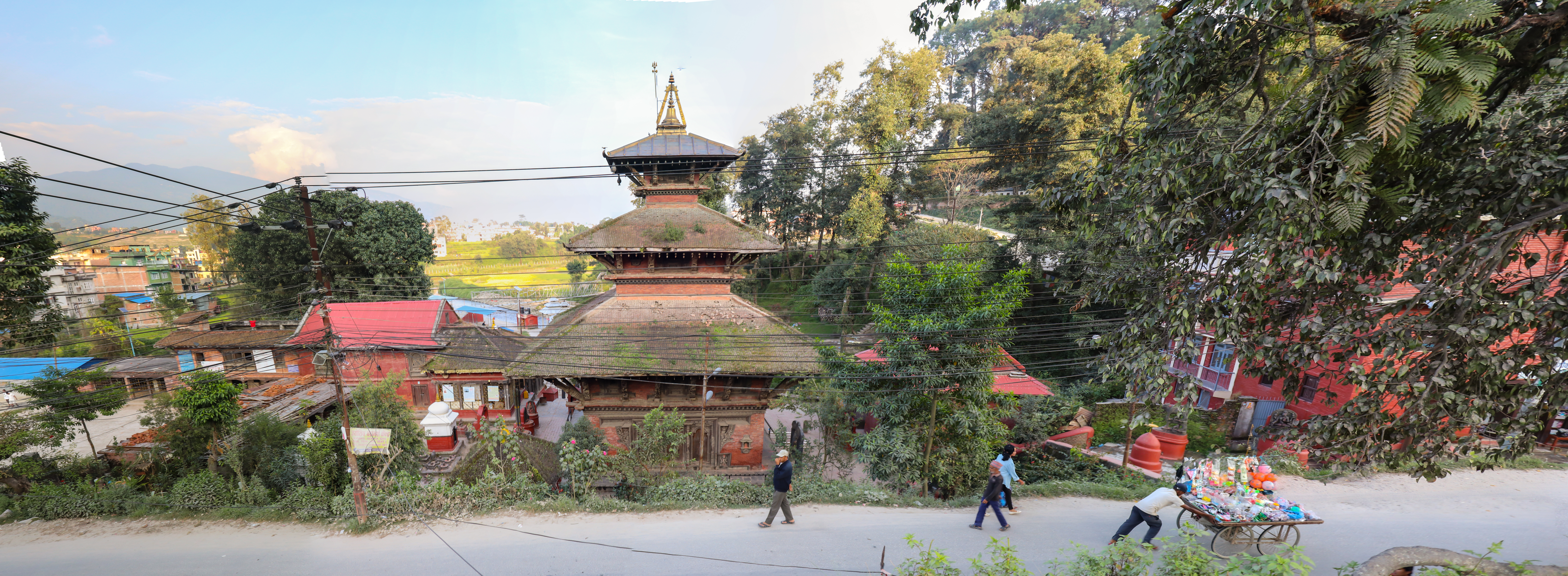
Gokarna Mahadev Temple
