= Sachey Kumar Pahari =

Nepali physician and medical administrator

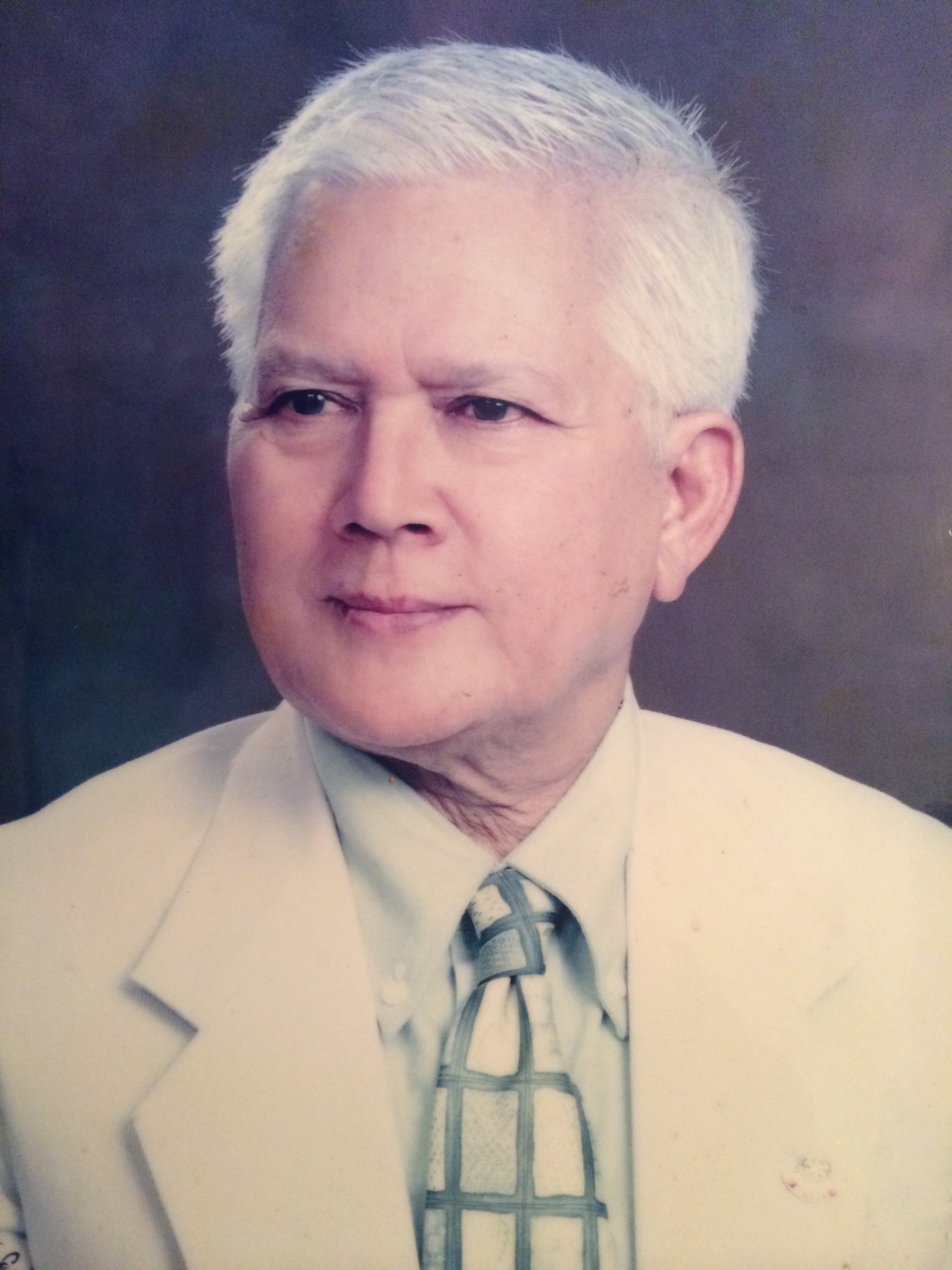
- Born: August 15, 1934
- Died: April 17, 2015; Kathmandu
- Education: Prince of Wales Medical College (Patna Medical College and Hospital); London School of Hygiene and Tropical Medicine
- Occupation: Physician
- Known for: Development of medical science and education in Nepal

Sachey Kumar Pahari MBBS DTM & H MRCP FRCP (August 15, 1934 – April 15, 2015) was a Nepali physician and medical administrator.

== Early life and education ==
Pahari received his early education in Nepal and India before proceeding to the United Kingdom for further qualification including MRCP and FRCS.

He was appointed FRCS Fellow of the Royal College of Physicians, United Kingdom in 1975.

== Career ==
Pahari started his career at Bir Hospital as a senior physician following his return from the United Kingdom. He was also the physician to King Mahendra and King Birendra and later became the first Nepali to be honoured with the title of "royal physician" by King Birendra, a rank that had only been previously held by overseas doctors.

Pahari established Nepal Medical College and teaching hospital in Jorpati, Kathmandu in 1997 as its founding executive chairman. He was also the founding chairman of Norvic International Hospital, a cardiac specialist centre in Thapathali, Kathmandu.

Pahari held several other positions, including president of the Nepal Health Research Council (2003–2006) and Chairman of the Nepal Medical Association.

== Personal life ==
Pahari enjoyed composing poetry, and was interested in Nepali art, literature and music. He was a published lyricist and had released several albums including Deu Chuli Ra Barchuli along with his wife, which featured the voices of prominent national singers including Nati Kaji and Tara Devi.

He died in 2015 at the age of 80.

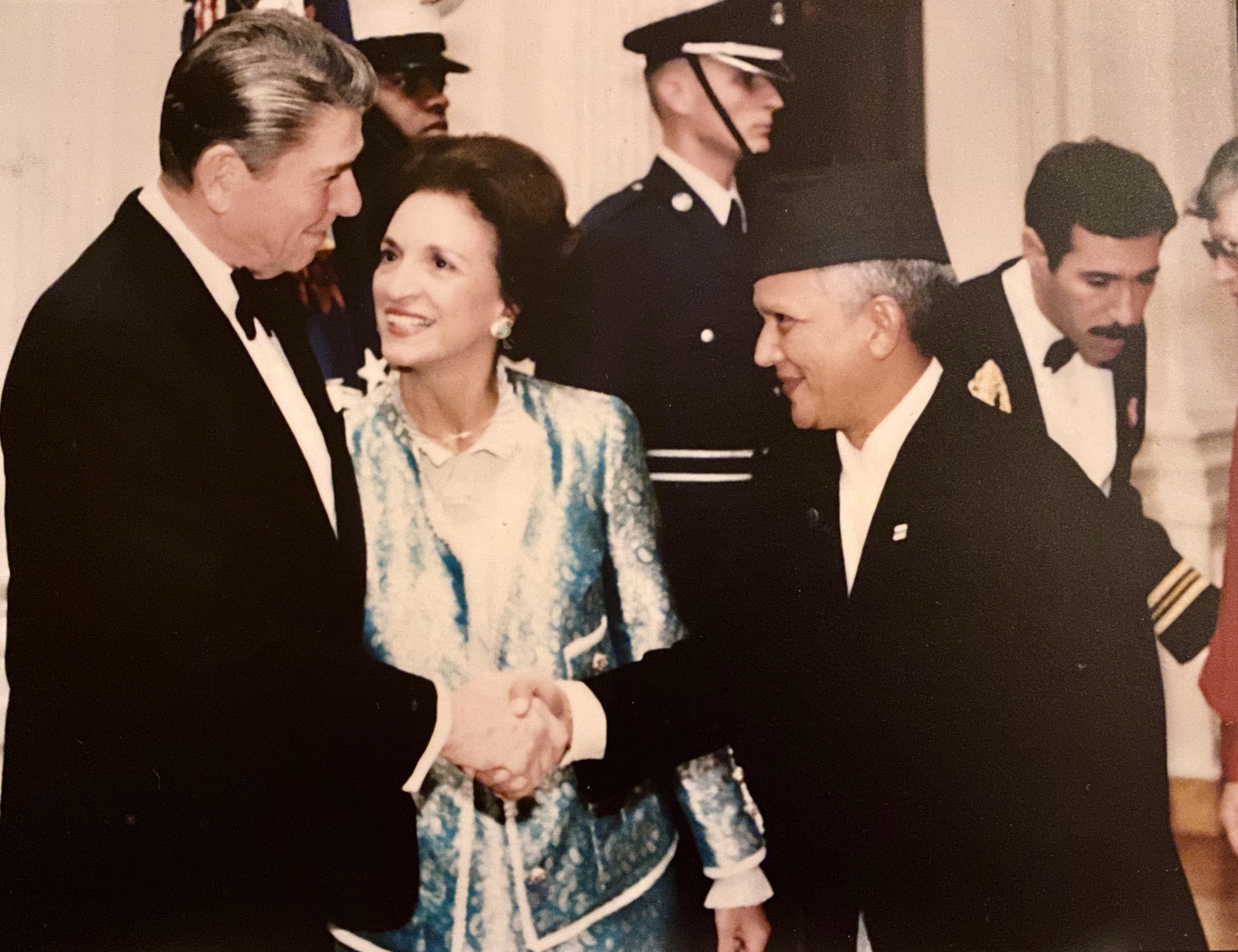
Pahari with President Reagan, White House, 1983
