= Sundarijal =

Sundarijal सुन्दरीजल
- Village of Gokarneshwar Municipality
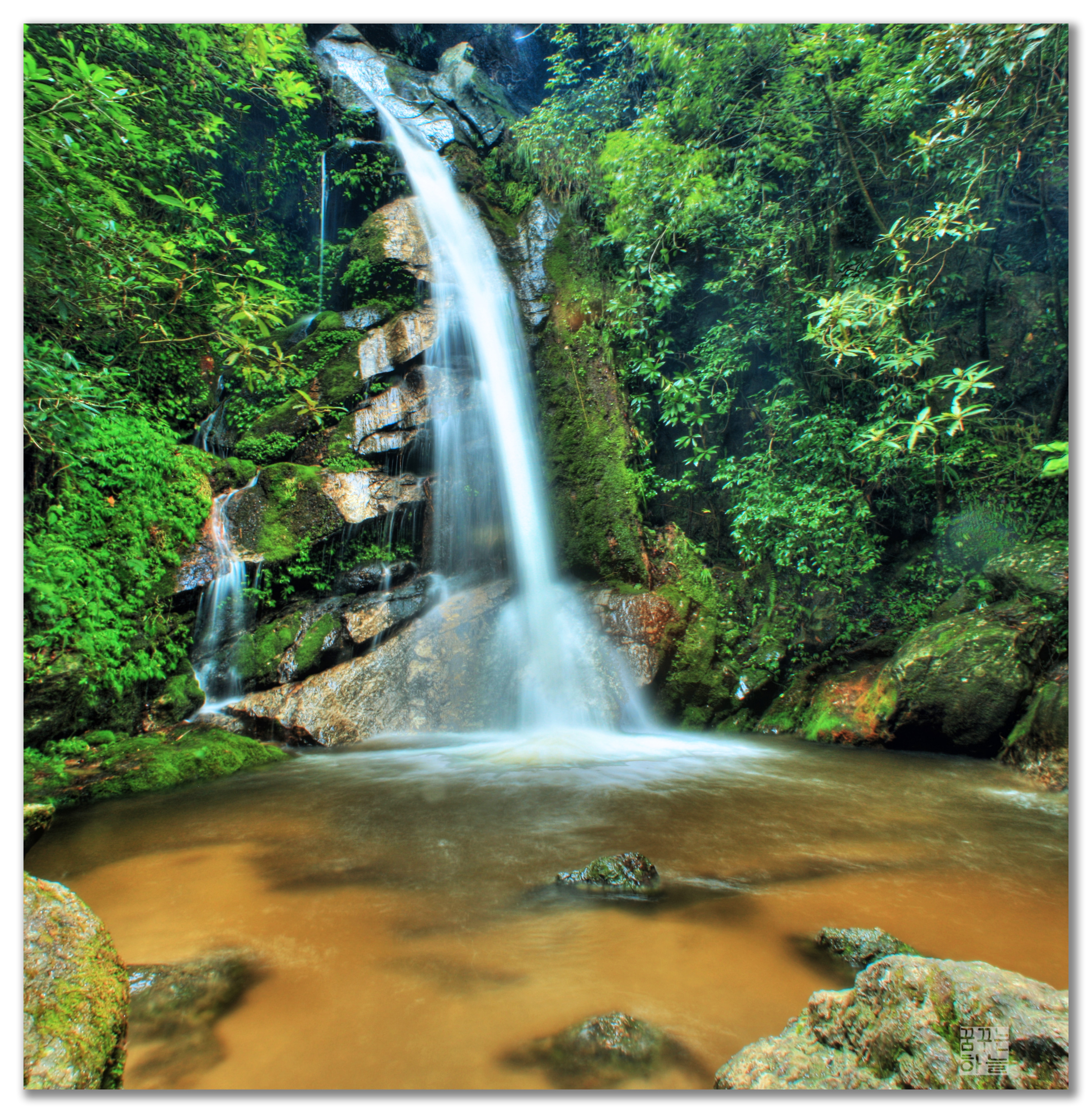
- The waterfall Sweet Sixteen, Sundarijal, Nepal

- Location in Nepal
- Coordinates: 27°43′46.20″N 85°24′23.45″E
- Country: Nepal
- Province: No. 3
- District: Kathmandu District

Area
  - Total: 5.18 km^{2} (2.00 sq mi)

Population (2001)
  - Total: 2,586
  - Density: 499/km^{2} (1,290/sq mi)
- Time zone: UTC+5:45 (Nepal Time)
- Postal code: 44603
- Area code: 01

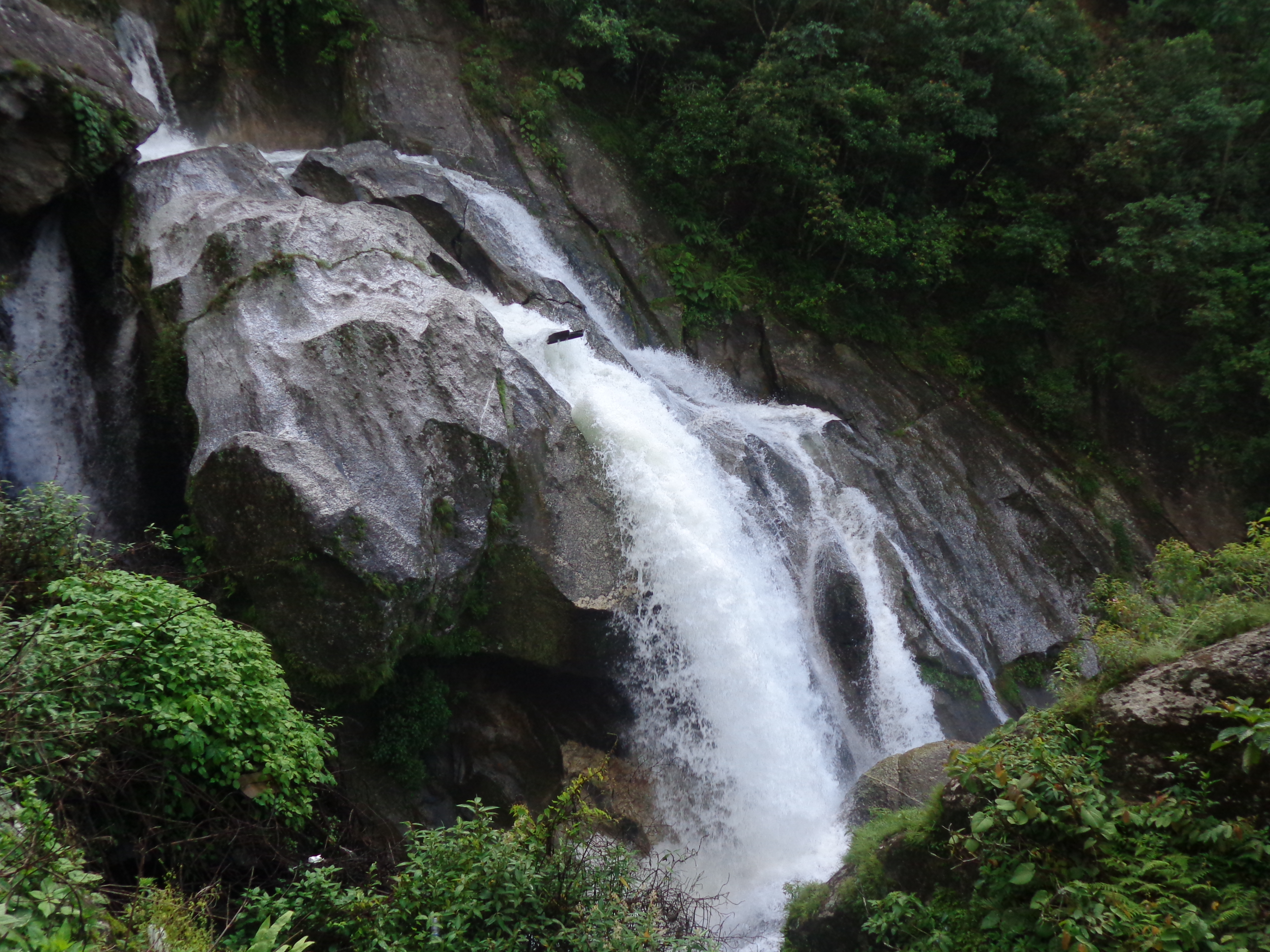
Sundarijal Waterfall

Sundarijal is a village and former Village Development Committee that is part of Gokarneshwar Municipality in Kathmandu district in Province No. 3 of central Nepal.

== History ==
The name Sundarijal was derived from the term sundari, which means 'beautiful' and jal, which means 'water'. The river Bagmati, which originates in this region, has been the major source of water supply for Kathmandu valley since the Rana Dynasty. There is also a Hindu goddess, Sundarimai, with a temple dedicated to this name.

Sundarijal Hydropower Station, located at Sundarijal, 15 km (9.3 mi) northeast of Kathmandu with previous installed capacity of 640KW, now upgraded to 970 KW + 10% with fully customized automation from July 2021 under rehab works by contractor Power Mech Project Ltd. It has a kW and annual design generation of 4.77 GWh and was commissioned in 1934 in a grant from British government. It was Nepal's second oldest Hydropower Electricity Project then.

In 1960, leaders from the Nepali Congress party B.P. Koirala (then prime minister), Ganesh Man Singh, Krishna Prasad Bhattarai, Diwan Singh Rai, Ram Narayan Mishra, Yogendra Man Sherchan, and Jaman Singh Gurung were taken to Sundarijal Military Detention Camp. They were held there without trial for eight years due to their participation in the 1960 coup.

== Geography and climate ==
=== Geographical situation ===
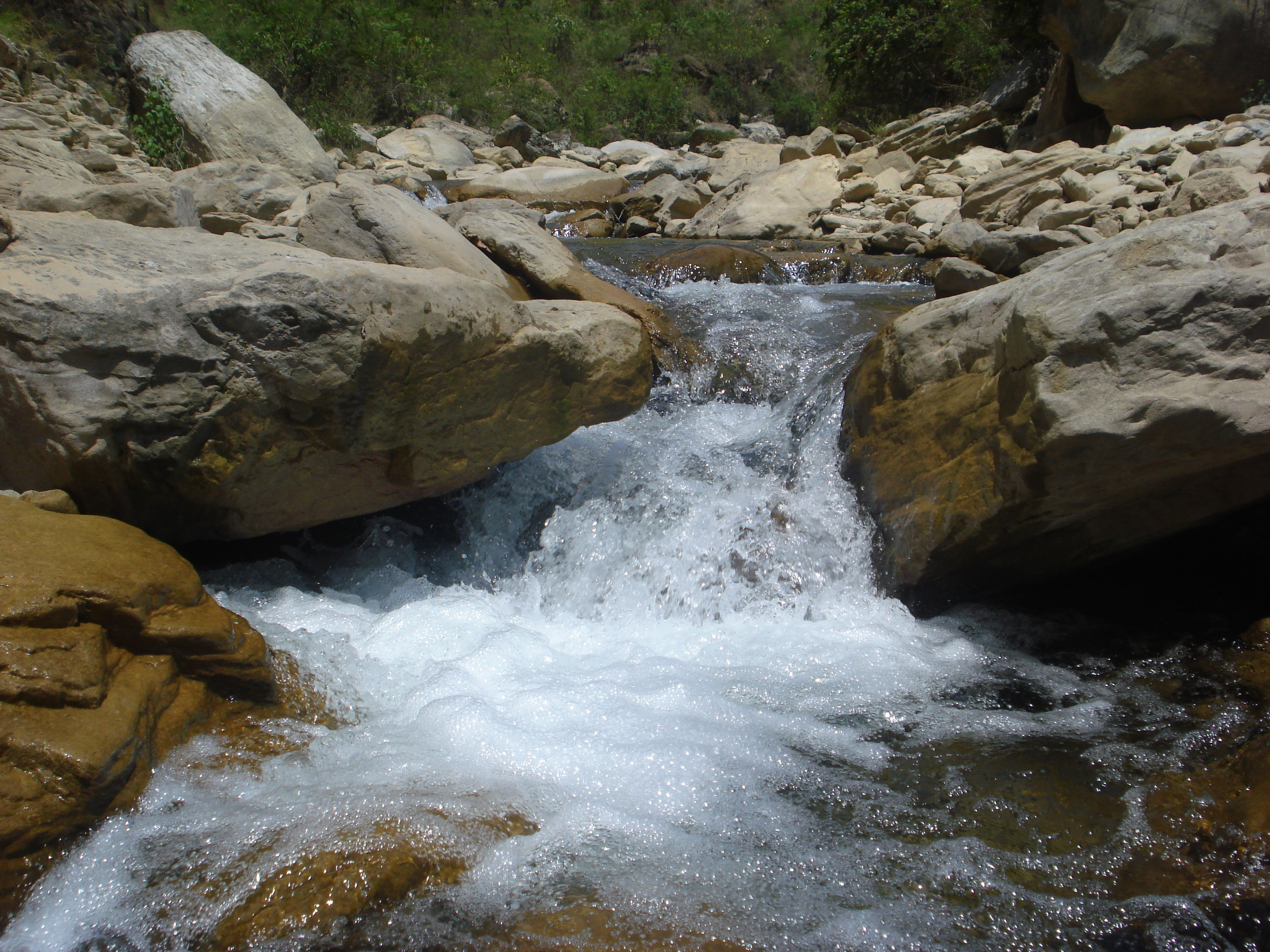
View of Bagmati River from Sundarijal

Sundarijal is located 15 kilometres (9.3 mi) northeast of Nepal's capital, Kathmandu. It is located in west side of Gagalphedi, east of Nayapati and Baluwa, and north of Aalapot. Northern portion of Sundarijal is the forest that belongs to Shivapuri National Park. Further to the end of Shivapuri National Park the Village touches Nuwakot and Sindhulpalchok Districts.

Sundarijal covers an area of 5.18 square kilometres (2.00 sq mi). The Bagmati River flows through the village, where tributary rivers Shyalmati and Nagmati confluence with the Bagmati River. The Sundarimai temple is located at the confluence of Nagmati and Bagmati. Similarly, there is Shiva temple at the confluence of the Shyalmati and Bagmati.

=== Climate ===
The climate of Sundarijal is temperate. The average temperature in summer is 25.5 °C (77.9 °F) and 0 °C (32 °F) in winter.

== Demographics ==
At the time of the 2011 Nepal census Sundarijal had a population of 2,552 living in 547 individual households. For the 2001 census Sundarijal had a population of 2,586 in 444 individual households. Sixty percent of the townsfolk are Buddhist and 40% are Hindu.

Below are the populations and households of Sundarijal's nine wards:

| Ward | Households | Male | Female | Total |
|---|---|---|---|---|
| 1 | 30 | 86 | 88 | 174 |
| 2 | 104 | 278 | 295 | 573 |
| 3 | 51 | 117 | 118 | 235 |
| 4 | 54 | 113 | 136 | 249 |
| 5 | 37 | 149 | 105 | 254 |
| 6 | 32 | 89 | 86 | 175 |
| 7 | 35 | 95 | 105 | 200 |
| 8 | 35 | 175 | 132 | 307 |
| 9 | 66 | 209 | 210 | 419 |
| | 444 | 1,311 | 1,275 | 2,586 |

== Economy ==
=== Agriculture ===
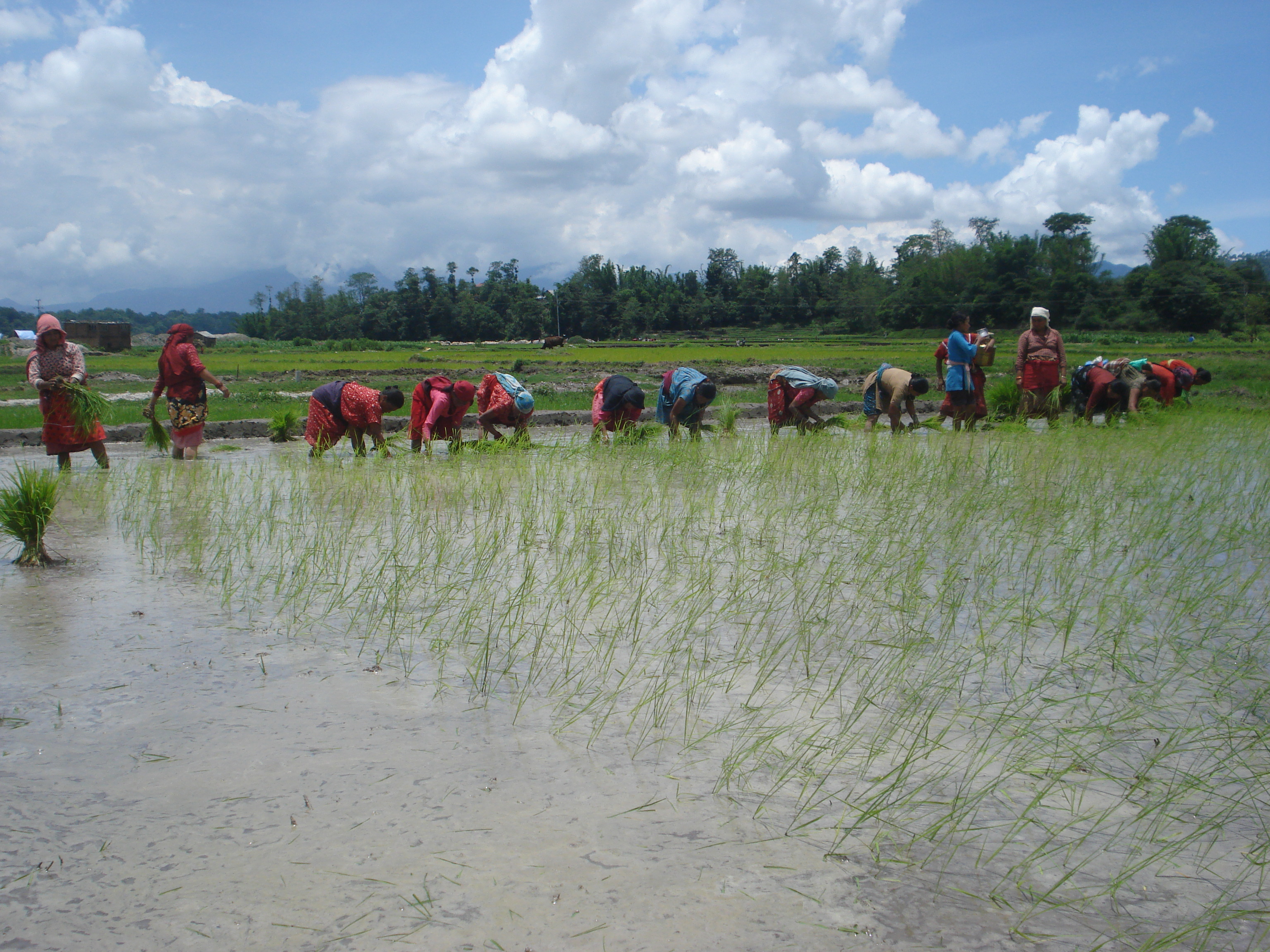
Rice farming at Sundarijal

Agriculture in the VDC is only present in the eighth ward. There farmers only use traditional techniques without modern technology. In the northern part of the ward, the predominant crops are millet and maize, though barley and some vegetables are also cultivated. In the southern area, wheat, barley, maize, potato, vegetables and millet are grown.

=== Tourism ===
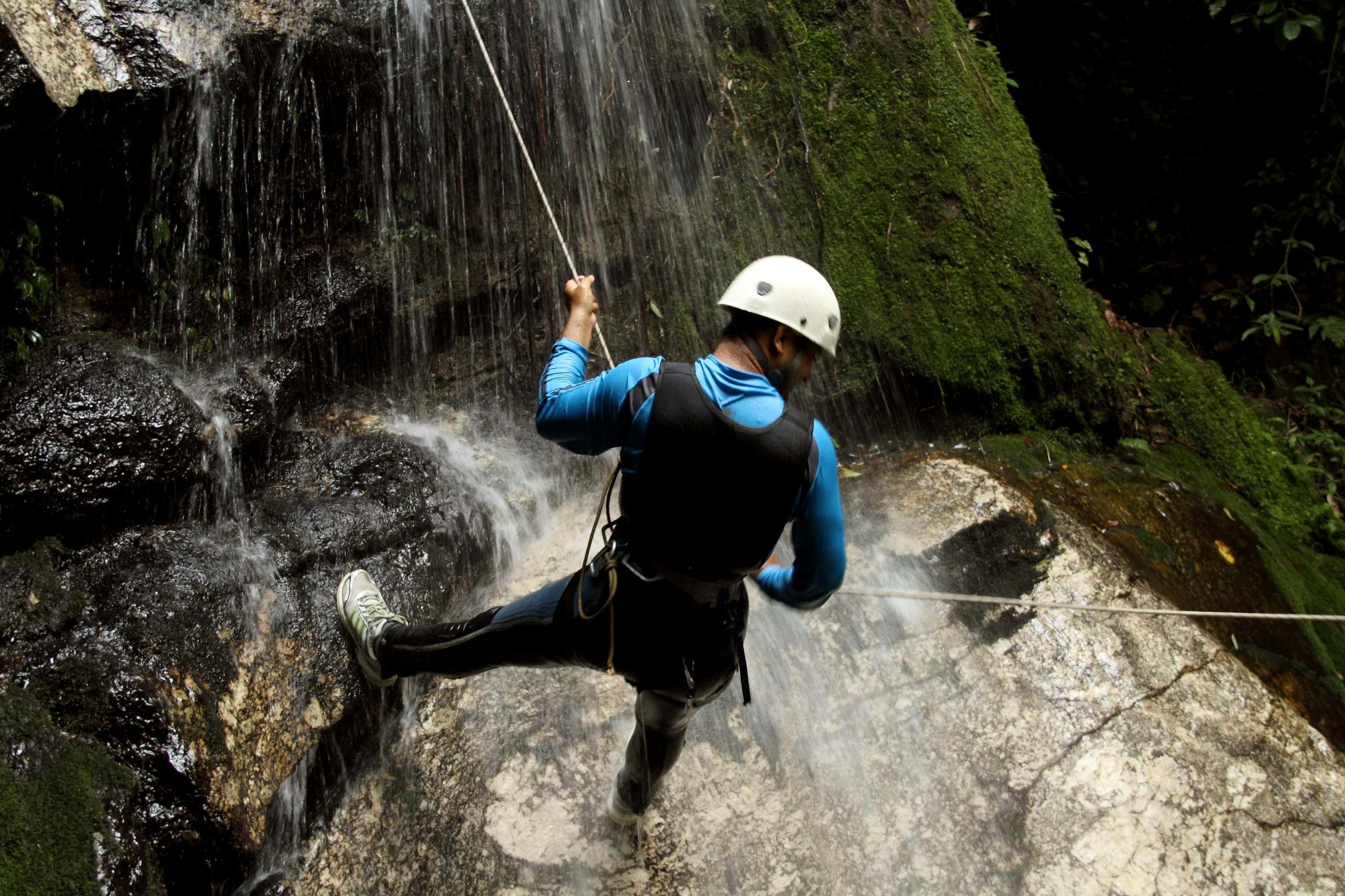
Canyoning at Sundarijal

Many tourists come from the Kathmandu Valley, about an hour's drive away. Pollution in the Sundarijal reservoir has increased due to the number of tourists.

In addition, the VDC is a starting point for hikers along the Langtang Range. Various trekking routes also lie in Sundarijal, among them the Sundarijal-to-Chisapani trek, almost 22 km long.

== Culture ==
The main religious sites in Sundarijal are the temples of Sundarimai Mandir, Ganesh Mandir, and Krishna Mandir. In July, the Dashahara festival is celebrated at confluence of Shyalmati and Bagmati.

== Infrastructure ==
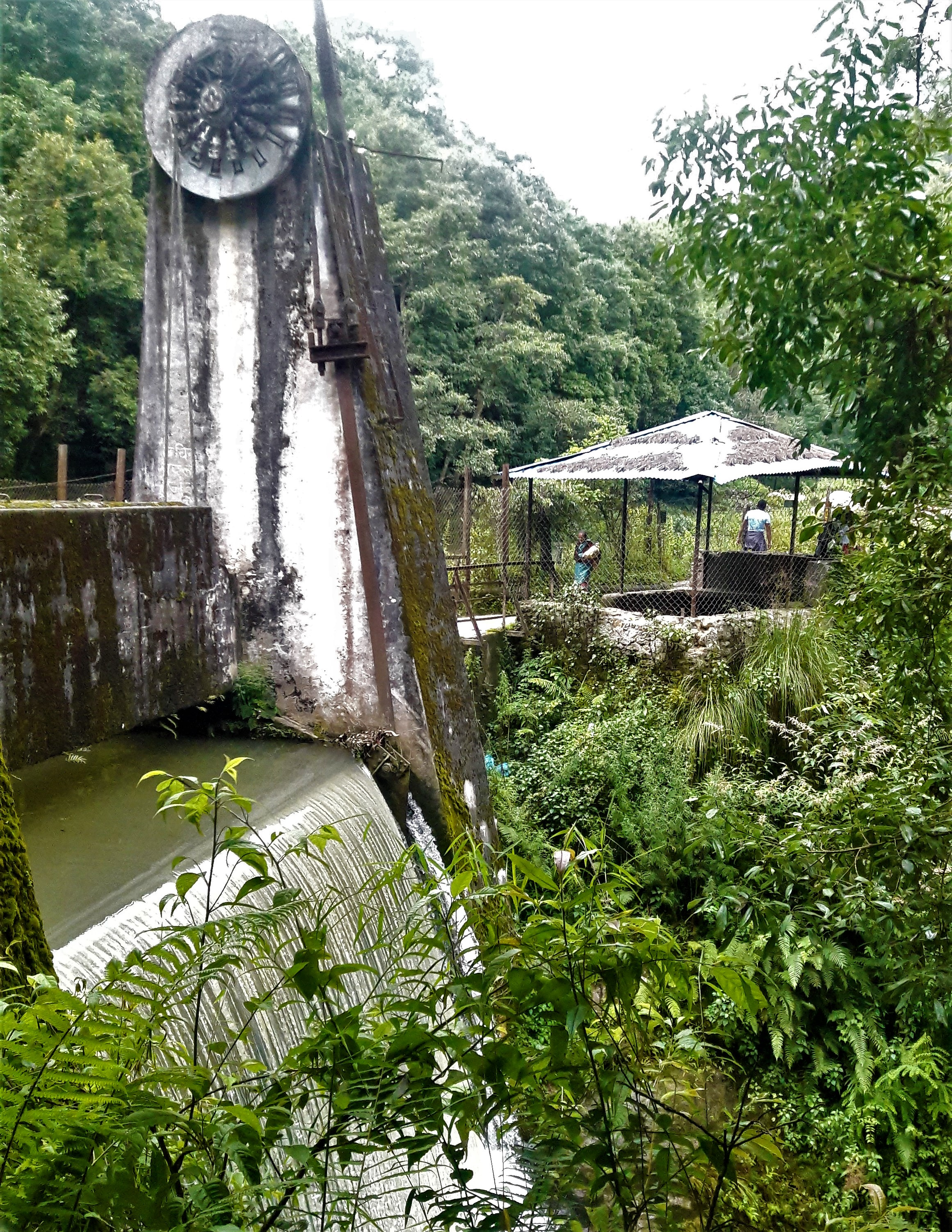
Dam present on the trekking route of Nagarjun NP which creates a reservoir for hydroelectricity and water treatment

A 640 kW now upgraded to 970 KW+10% hydropower plant near the bus park provides electricity to Sundarijal. A mail post and police station are also located here.

BP Museum is also located in Sundarijal. The museum is one of the historical places in Nepal in present state, but it took long time for this to be established as a museum. It has its own historical transformation. Before, it was an Army General Quarter and then, it was changed into Rajbandigriha where prisoners were kept, after that again it changed to Gaida Gasti which again was changed to Sundarijal Military Camp and finally, after the detention of leaders like B.P it came into the light and was established as B.P Museum.

There is a US$464 million drinking-water project in Sundarijal that will bring water from Melamchi, treat, and distribute it. A pipeline, 58 kilometres (36 mi) in length will be laid from Sundarijal to the town in the Kathmandu Valley. It will start pumping 170,000,000 litres (45,000,000 US gal) of water daily in 2020.

The National Scout Training Center is also located here inside the Shivapuri Nagarjun National Park. The center carries the history of more than a hundred years since the regime of Rana Prime Ministers Juddha Sumser, Dev Sumser, and Bir Sumser; hence modern facilities and amenities have not been introduced however the National Training Centre offers visitors comfortable camping space for around a hundred people at a time.

Nepal Army's arsenal is also located in Sundarijal.

== Education ==
About 90% of residents can read or write, though fewer than that are fully literate. Those under the age of 25 years are more likely to be literate than those over forty. Literacy classes for older adults were available in the past, though due to low attendance they are no longer offered.

There are four schools in Sundarijal, whose attendance is shown below:

| # | Male | Female | Total |
|---|---|---|---|
| 1 | 214 | 200 | 414 |
| 2 | 57 | 44 | 101 |
| 3 | 90 | 67 | 157 |
| 4 | 70 | 57 | 127 |
| | 431 | 368 | 799 |

== Biodiversity ==
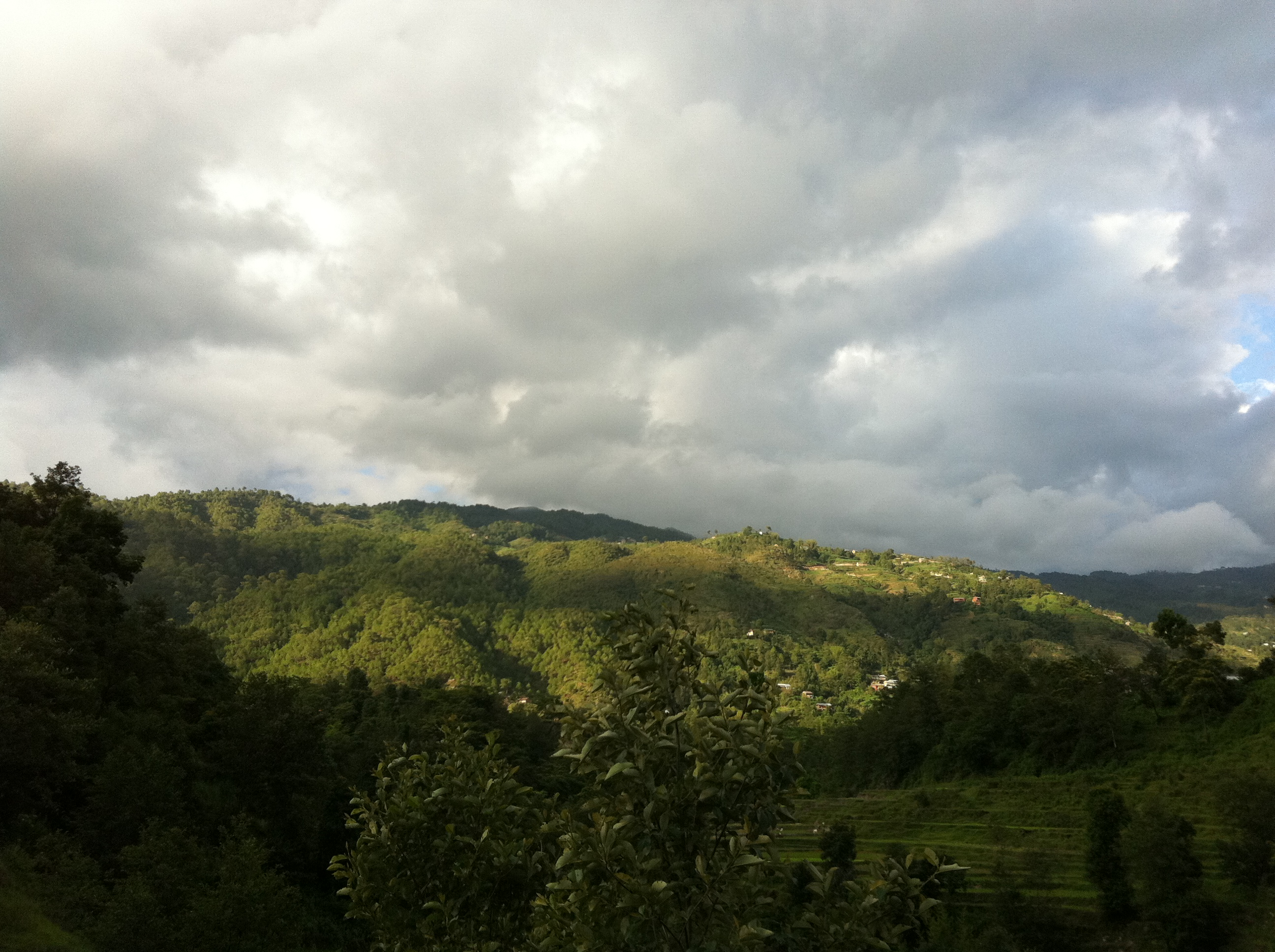
A view of Shivapuri National Park from Sundarijal

Sundarijal's vegetation consists of mostly pine, oak, rhododendron, and other forest types. Wildlife recorded in the area include the Himalayan black bear, leopard, jungle cat, and rhesus monkey. The area around Sundarijal is the habitat of 177 species of birds, which includes at least nine threatened species, 102 species of butterflies with several endangered species, and 129 species of mushrooms.
