= Nayapati =

Nayapati नयाँपाटी
- Village of Gokarneshwar Municipality
- Location in Nepal
- Coordinates: 27.76°N 85.41°E
- Country: Nepal
- Province: No. 3
- District: Kathmandu District

Population (1991)
  - Total: 4,056
- Time zone: UTC+5:45 (Nepal Time)

Nayapati is a village and former Village Development Committee that is now part of Gokarneshwar Municipality in Kathmandu District in Province No. 3 of central Nepal. At the time of the 1991 Nepal census it had a population of 4,056 living in 761 households.
