= Jorpati =

Jorpati जोरपाटी
- Village of Gokarneshwar Municipality
- Location in Nepal
- Coordinates: 27.72°N 85.38°E
- Country: Nepal
- Province: No. 3
- District: Kathmandu District

Population (2011)
  - Total: 84,567
- Time zone: UTC+5:45 (Nepal Time)

Jorpati is a village and former Village Development Committee that is now part of Gokarneshwar Municipality in Kathmandu District in Province No. 3 of central Nepal. In the 2011 census it had a population of 84,567 making it one of the largest villages in the world. At the time of the 1991 Nepal census it had a population of 10,796 and had 1,988 households in it.

In the year 2016 Jorpati has become Municipality from VDC with a population of more than 500,000. Jorpati is the gateway for Sundarijaal and Sakhu.
