= Gokarneshwor Mahadev temple =

Temple in Kathmandu, Nepal

Coordinates: 27°44′22″N 85°23′16″E

Gokarna Mahadev (The Gods of Gokarna) or Gokarneshwor Mahadev Temple (The Lord of Gokarna) is an important Nepali temple, situated near the village of Gokarna, several kilometers northeast of Bodhnath in the Kathmandu Valley. Within the temple's sanctum lies an important lingam of the Hindu god Shiva, but its fame relies mainly on the collection of statues and carvings around the temple.

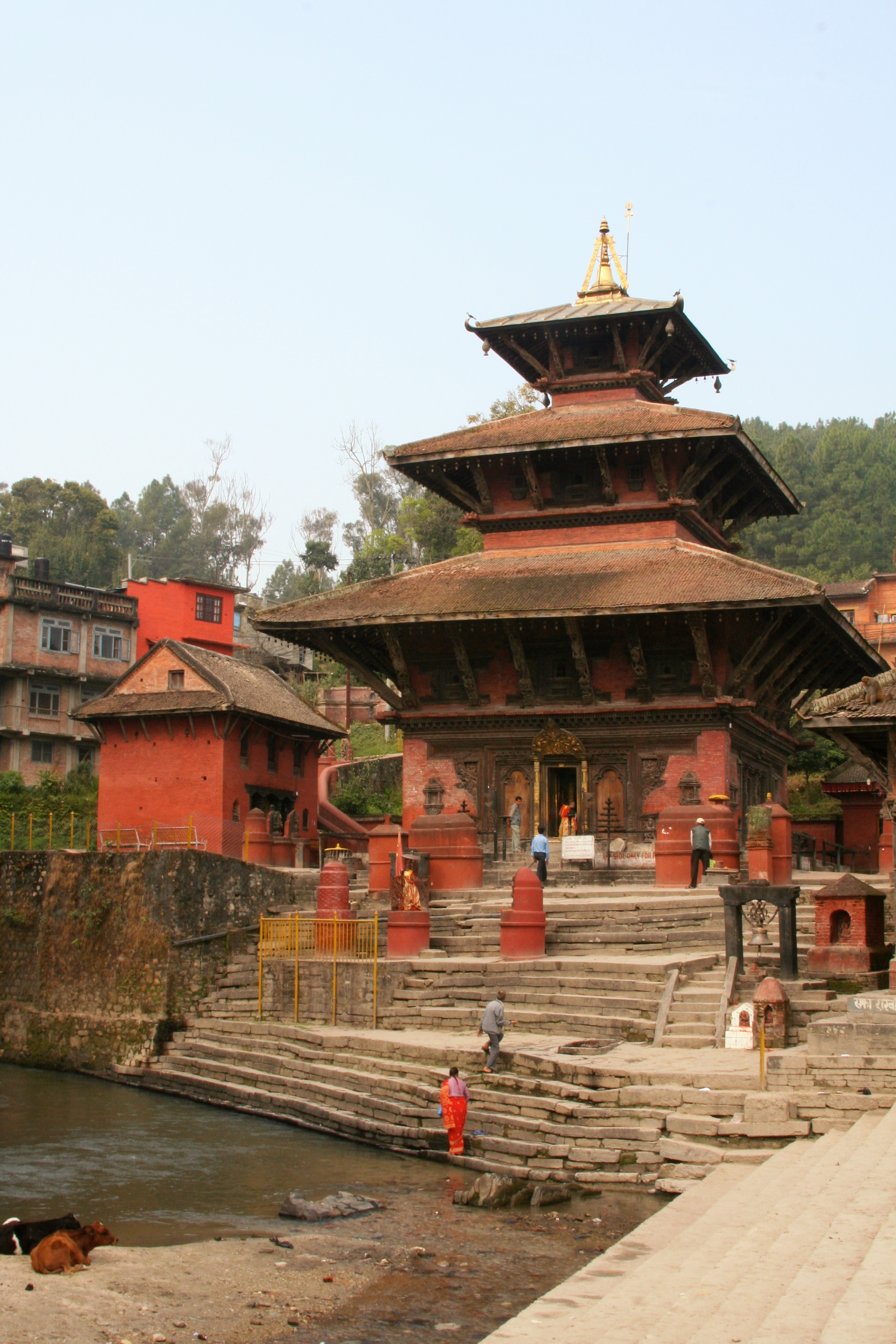
Pagoda of Gokarna Mahadev and terraces on the Bagmati

== Gallery ==
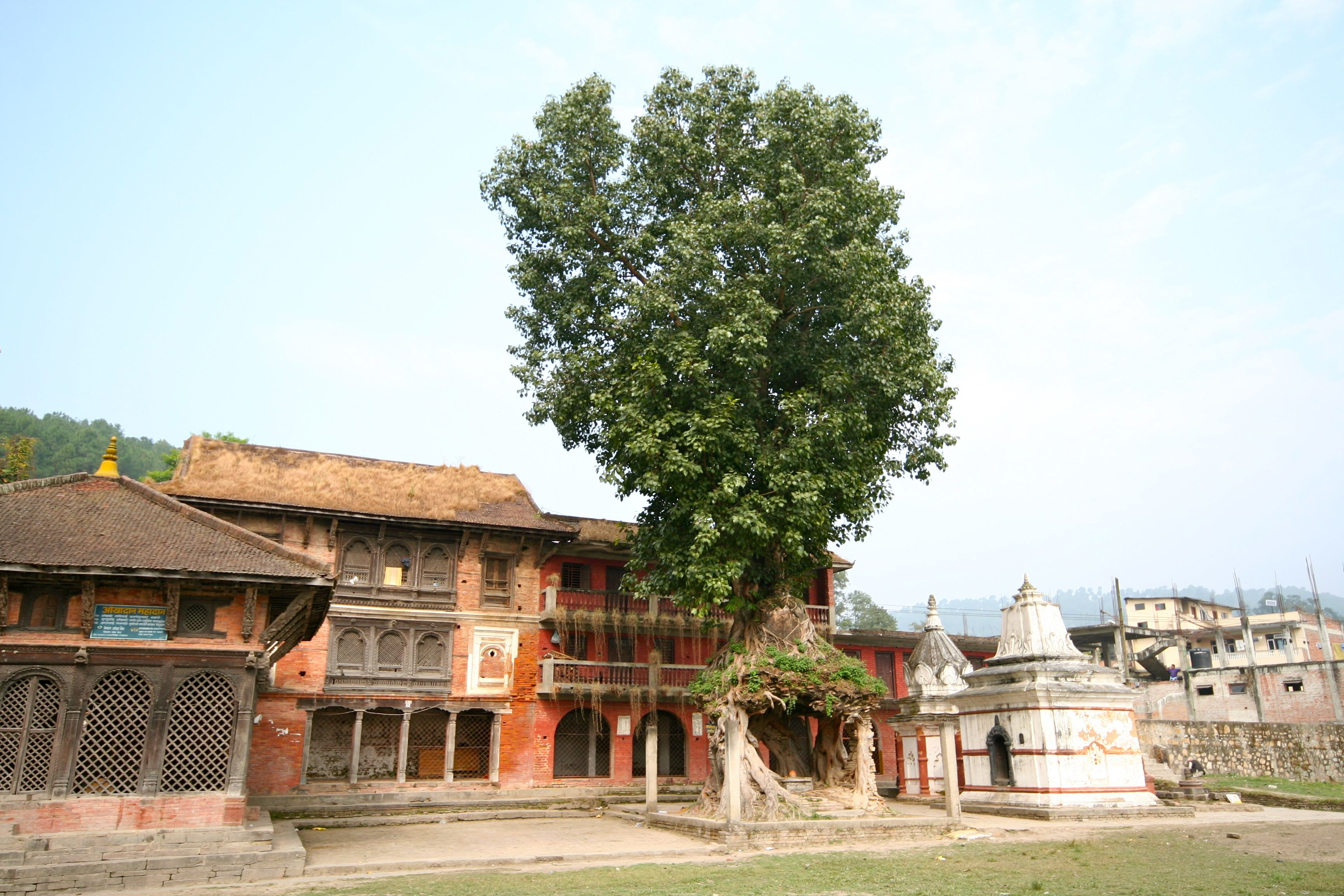
Vishnu Paduka, pilgrim hostels and a shrine overgrown by a fig tree

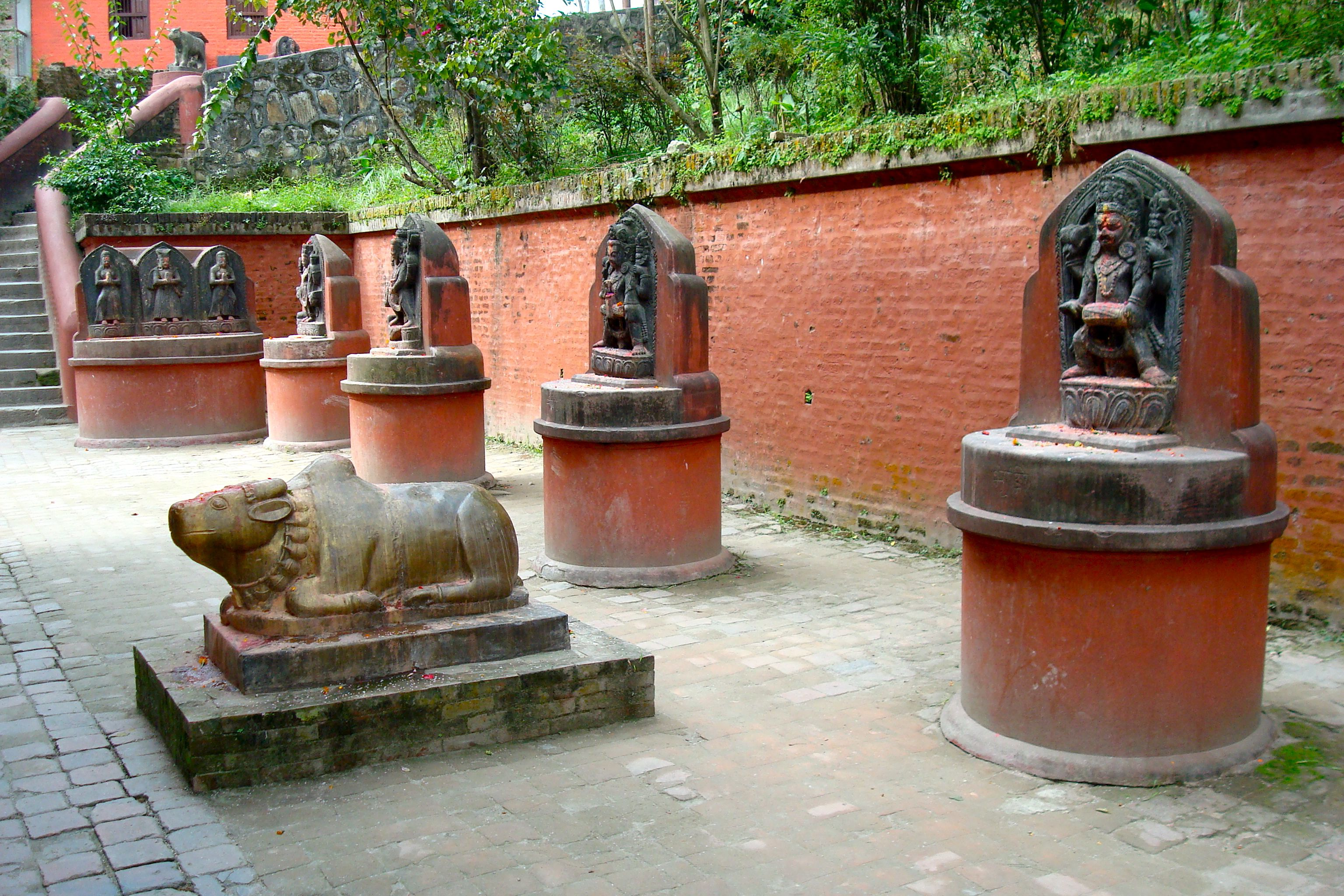
Statues of Nandi (in the foreground), Pande and his two wives, Vishnu, bearded Brahma, Brindi Bhairab and Nandi Bhairab (along the wall from left to right)

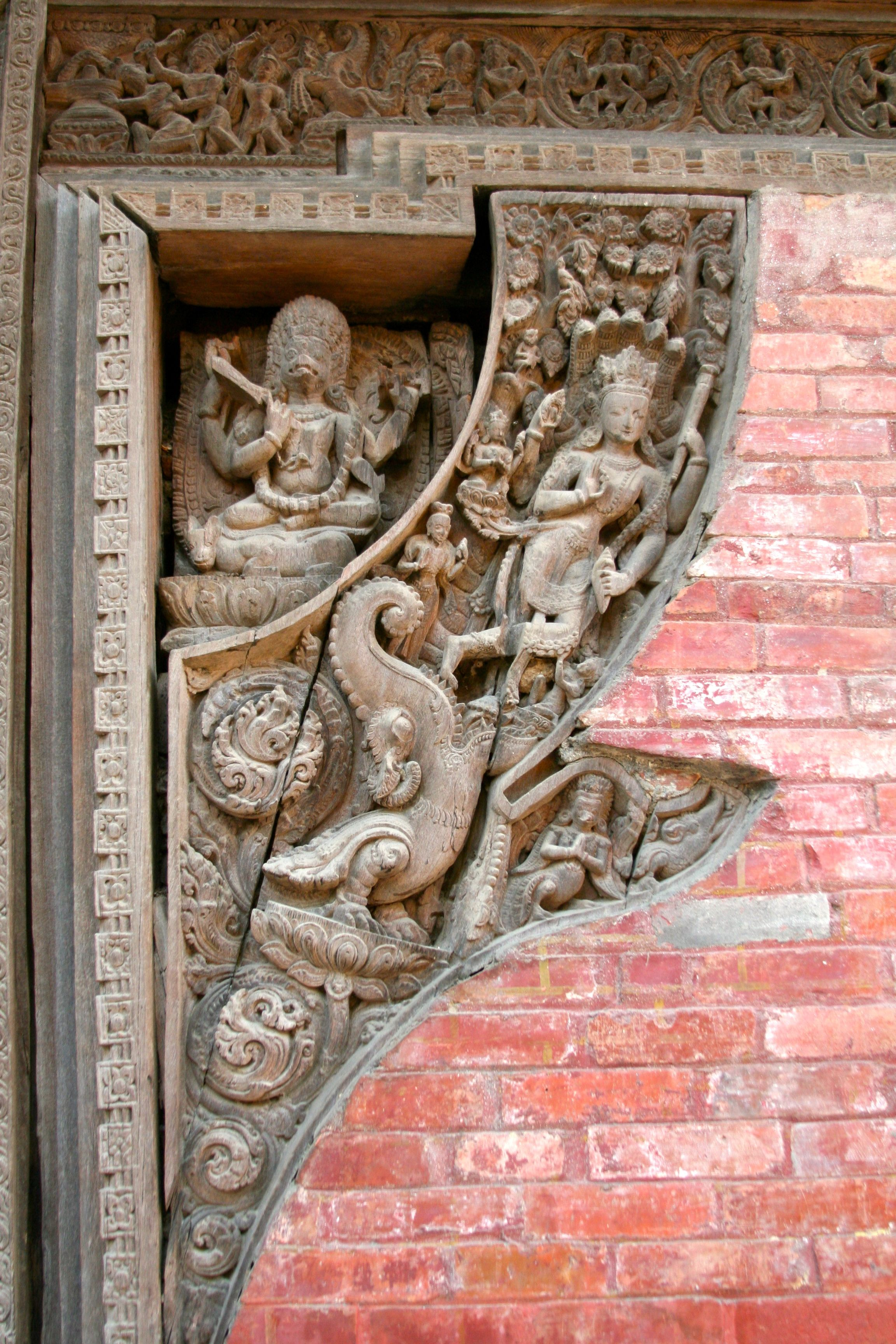
Carvings on the west side of the pagoda

== See also ==
- Betrawati, the Uttar Gaya
- List of Hindu temples in Nepal
