= Baluwa, Kathmandu =

Baluwa बालुवा
- Village of Gokarneshwar Municipality
- Location in Nepal
- Coordinates: 27°46′12″N 85°23′24″E
- Country: Nepal
- Province: Bagmati Province
- District: Kathmandu District

Population (2011)
  - Total: 5,467
  - Religions: Hindu
- Time zone: UTC+5:45 (Nepal Time)

VDC Map of Kathmandu district

Baluwa (Nepali: बालुवा) is a village and former Village Development Committee that is now part of Gokarneshwar Municipality in Kathmandu District in Bagmati Province of central Nepal. At the time of the 2011 Nepal census it had a population of 5,467 and had 1,204 houses in it. It is located at north-east side from the capital city of Nepal. It touch Nuwakot District to the north and Gorkna VDC to the south. In east side, there is Nayapati VDC and in west Kapan VDC.

At the north side, Shivapuri – Nagarjun National Park is located which is the main source of fresh water for the resident of Kathmandu. Bagdwar is the origin of Bagmati river, the Pavitra Nadi (the Holy River) of Hindus. The capital city of Nepal, Kathmandu, is located at the bank of Bagmati River.

== Toponymy ==
=== Linguistic origin ===
- Linguistic family: Indoeuropean
- Language: Sanskrit

=== Etymology ===
“Baluwa” means sand, sandy soil, or an area with an abundance of sand. The place was given this name because of the presence of sand in its land. Baluwa (बलुवा) means “sand” — derived from Sanskrit वलुक (valuka), meaning “sand, sandy soil,” which evolved into बालुवा (bāluwā) in Nepali. The toponym is of Sanskrit origin, adapted to modern Nepali phonology.
