= Kathmandu 1 =

Parliamentary constituency in Nepal

- Parliamentary constituency for the House of Representatives
- Kathmandu 1 in Bagmati Province

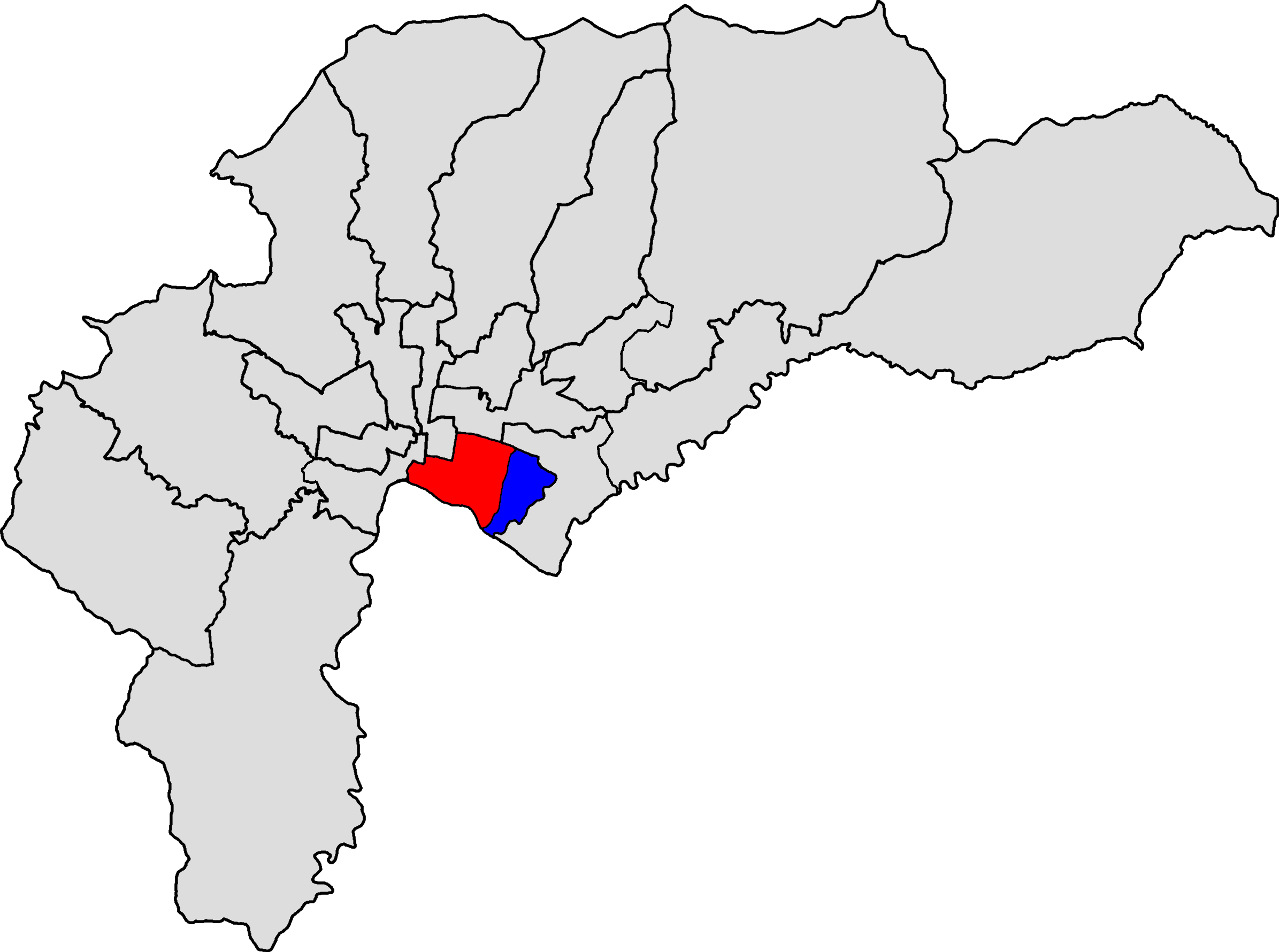
- Assembly segment Kathmandu 1(A) (red) and Kathmandu 1(B) (blue) within Kathmandu District
- Province: Bagmati Province
- District: Kathmandu District
- Electorate: 42,430

Current constituency
- Created: 2017
- Party: Rastriya Swatantra Party
- Member of Parliament: Ranju Darshana

Kathmandu 1 is one of 10 parliamentary constituencies of Kathmandu District in Nepal. This constituency came into existence on the Constituency Delimitation Commission (CDC) report submitted on 31 August 2017.

== Incorporated areas ==
Kathmandu 1 parliamentary constituency consist area of ward number 10, 11, 29 and 31 of Kathmandu Metropolitan City.

Election	Incorporated areas
1991	Nanglebhare; Lapsephedi; Sankhubajrayogini; Sankhu Suntole; Pukhulachhi; Indrayani; Bhadrabas; Thalidachhi; Mulpani; Gothatar; Koteshwor; Aalapot; Jorpati; Kathmandu 6–10
1994	Nanglebhare; Lapsiphedi; Bajrayogini; Suntole; Pukhulachhi; Gagalphedi; Indrayani; Aalapot; Bhadrabas; Daanchhi; Mulpani; Gothatar; Kathmandu 10, 34, 35
1999	Nanglebhare; Lapsiphedi; Bajrayogini; Suntole; Pukhulachhi; Gagalphedi; Indrayani; Aalapot; Bhadrabas; Daanchhi; Mulpani; Gothatar; Kathmandu 10, 34, 35
2008	Kathmandu 10,11, 32, 34
2013	Kathmandu 10,11, 32, 34
2017	Kathmandu 10, 11, 29, 31
2022	Kathmandu 10, 11, 29, 31
2026	Kathmandu 10, 11, 29, 31

== Assembly segments ==
It encompasses the following Bagmati Province Provincial Assembly segment

- Kathmandu 1(A) - ward no. 11,29
- Kathmandu 1(B)- ward no. 10,31

== Members of Parliament ==
=== Parliament/Constituent Assembly ===
Election	Member	Party
1991	Madan Bhandari	CPN (UML)
1994 by-election	Bidya Devi Bhandari	CPN (UML)
1994	Man Mohan Adhikari	CPN (UML)
1997 by-election	Narayan Prasad Dhakal	CPN (UML)
1999	Pradeep Nepal	CPN (UML)
2008	Prakash Man Singh	Nepali Congress
2013	Prakash Man Singh	Nepali Congress
2017	Prakash Man Singh	Nepali Congress
2022	Prakash Man Singh	Nepali Congress
2026	Ranju Darshana	Rastriya Swatantra Party

=== Provincial Assembly ===
==== 1(A) ====
Election	Member	Party
2017	Dipendra Shrestha	Nepali Congress
2022	Dipendra Shrestha	Nepali Congress

==== 1(B) ====
Election	Member	Party
2017	Ganesh Prasad Dulal	CPN (UML)
May 2018	Ganesh Prasad Dulal	Nepal Communist Party
March 2021	Ganesh Prasad Dulal	CPN (UML)
2022	Suraj Chandra Lamichhane	Nepali Congress

== Election results ==
=== Election in the 2020s ===
==== 2026 general election ====
Candidate	Party	Votes	%	+/–
Ranju Darshana	Rastriya Swatantra Party	15,455	53.14	+37.41
Prabal Thapa Chhetri	Nepali Congress	6,364	21.88	–5.42
Rabindra Mishra	Rastriya Prajatantra Party	3,972	13.66	–13.16
Mohan Raj Regmi	CPN (UML)	1,618	5.56	–7.94
Mang Lal Shrestha	Ujyaalo Nepal Party	466	1.60	New
Samir Lama Tamang	Shram Sanskriti Party	426	1.46	New
Menuka Bhandari	Nepali Communist Party	345	1.19	New
Others		436	1.50	−
Total		29,082	100.00	–
Valid votes		29,082	98.53	
Invalid/blank votes		434	1.47	
Total votes		29,516	100.00	
Registered voters/turnout		55,292	53.38	
Majority		9,091		
Rastriya Swatantra Party gain				

==== 2022 general election ====
Candidate	Party	Votes	%	+/–
Prakash Man Singh	Nepali Congress	7,143	27.30	–12.21
Rabindra Mishra	Rastriya Prajatantra Party	7,018	26.82	New
Pukar Bam	Rastriya Swatantra Party	4,115	15.73	New
Kiran Paudel	CPN (UML)	3,532	13.50	New
Ramesh Kharel	Nepal Sushasan Party	3,124	11.94	New
Others		1,234	4.72	–46.77
Total		26,166	100.00	–
Majority		125		
Nepali Congress hold				

==== 2022 provincial elections ====
===== Kathmandu 1(A) =====
Candidate	Party	Votes	%	+/–
Dipendra Shrestha	Nepali Congress	6,300	41.72	
Nabin Shahi	Rastriya Prajatantra Party	3,504	23.21	
Ram Prasad Amagai	CPN (UML)	2,297	15.21	
Samrat Sapkota	Nepal Sushashan Party	2,113	13.99	New
Others		886	5.87	
Total		15,100	100.00	–
Majority		2,796		
Nepali Congress hold				

===== Kathmandu 1(B) =====
Candidate	Party	Votes	%
Suraj Chandra Lamichhane	Nepali Congress	4,510	40.74
Ganesh Prasad Dulal	CPN (UML)	2,753	24.87
Yagya Bahadur Shah	Rastriya Prajatantra Party	1,855	16.76
Anjana Shahi	Nepal Sushashan Party	990	8.94
Others		962	8.69
Total		11,070	100.00
Majority		1,757	
Nepali Congress gain			

=== Election in the 2010s ===
==== 2017 general election ====
Candidate	Party	Votes	%	+/–
Prakash Man Singh	Nepali Congress	10,936	39.51	–12.9
Rabindra Mishra	Bibeksheel Sajha Party	10,118	36.55	New
Anil Kumar Sharma	CPN (Maoist Centre)	5,336	19.28	+5.21
Others		1,291	4.66	–28.86
Total		27,681	100.00	–
Valid votes		27,681	98.22	
Invalid/blank votes		503	1.78	
Total votes		28,184	100.00	
Registered voters/turnout		42,430	66.42	
Majority		818	1.48	–17.69
Nepali Congress hold				

==== 2017 provincial elections ====
===== Kathmandu 1(A) =====
Candidate	Party	Votes	%
Dipendra Shrestha	Nepali Congress	6,231	38.79
Bishnu Kumari Bhusal	CPN (UML)	4,619	28.76
Samikchya Baskota	Bibeksheel Sajha Party	4,343	27.04
Others		870	5.42
Total		16,063	100.00
Valid votes		16,063	98.32
Invalid/blank votes		274	1.68
Total votes		16,337	100.00
Registered voters/turnout		24,757	65.99
Majority		1,612	5.02
Nepali Congress gain			

===== Kathmandu 1(B) =====
Candidate	Party	Votes	%
Ganesh Prasad Dulal	CPN (UML)	4,242	36.37
Suraj Chandra Lamichhane	Nepali Congress	4,223	36.21
Purushottam Prasad Dhungel	Bibeksheel Sajha Party	2,725	23.37
Others		472	4.05
Total		11,662	100.00
Valid votes		11,662	98.25
Invalid/blank votes		208	1.75
Total votes		11,870	100.00
Registered voters/turnout		17,673	67.16
Majority		19	0.08
CPN (UML) gain			

==== 2013 Constituent Assembly election ====
Candidate	Party	Votes	%	+/–
Prakash Man Singh	Nepali Congress	15,138	52.41	+5.19
Renu Dahal	UCPN (Maoist)	4,064	14.07	–1.88
Bharat Mani Jangam	Rastriya Prajatantra Party Nepal	3,732	12.92	+9.48
Bidhya Neupane	CPN (UML)	3,501	12.12	–10.27
Others		2,449	8.48	
Total		28,884	100.00	–
Valid votes		28,884	96.36	
Invalid/blank votes		1,092	3.64	
Total votes		29,976	100.00	
Registered voters/turnout		39,164	76.54	
Majority		11,074	19.17	+6.75
Nepali Congress hold				

=== Election in the 2000s ===
==== 2008 Constituent Assembly election ====
Candidate	Party	Votes	%	+/–
Prakash Man Singh	Nepali Congress	14,318	47.22	+45.45
Pradeep Nepal	CPN (UML)	6,789	22.39	–20.68
Ram Man Shrestha	CPN (Maoist)	4,836	15.95	New
Gobinda Lamichhane	Rastriya Prajatantra Party Nepal	1,042	3.44	New
Others		3,336	11.00	–44.17
Total		30,321	100.00	–
Valid votes		30,321	100.00	
Invalid/blank votes		0	0.00	
Total votes		30,321	100.00	
Registered voters/turnout		51,171	59.25	
Majority		7,529	12.42	
Nepali Congress gain				
Source: Election Commission

=== Election in the 1990s ===
==== 1999 general election ====
Candidate	Party	Votes	%
Pradeep Nepal	CPN (UML)	17,601	43.07
Lokesh Dhakal	Independent	15,219	37.24
Bam Dev Gautam	CPN (Marxist–Leninist)	6,089	14.90
Krishna Prasad Bhattarai	Nepali Congress	722	1.77
Others		1,237	3.03
Total		40,868	100.00
Valid votes		40,868	98.33
Invalid/blank votes		695	1.67
Total votes		41,563	100.00
Registered voters/turnout		68,952	60.28
Majority		2,382	2.92
CPN (UML) hold			
Source: Election Commission

==== 1997 by-election ====
Candidate	Party
Narayan Prasad Dhakal	CPN (UML)
Lokesh Dhakal	Nepali Congress
Total
CPN (UML) hold	
Source: Election Commission

==== 1994 general election ====
Candidate	Party	Votes	%
Man Mohan Adhikari	CPN (UML)	25,672	54.86
Haribol Bhattarai	Nepali Congress	13,684	29.24
Nawaraj Sinkhada	Rastriya Prajatantra Party	5,936	12.68
Others		1,505	3.22
Total		46,797	100.00
CPN (UML) hold			
Source: Source: Election Commission

==== 1994 by-election ====
Candidate	Party	Votes	%
Bidya Devi Bhandari	CPN (UML)	43,319	46.47
Krishna Prasad Bhattarai	Nepali Congress	41,490	44.51
Jog Mehar Shrestha	Rastriya Prajatantra Party	7,533	8.08
N/A	Nepal Sadbhawana Party	376	0.40
N/A	CPN (United)	254	0.27
N/A	Nepal Workers Peasants Party	190	0.20
N/A	Prajatantrik Lok Dal	63	0.07
Total		93,225	100.00
Valid votes		93,225	97.77
Invalid/blank votes		2,124	2.23
Total votes		95,349	100.00
Registered voters/turnout		136,655	69.77
CPN (UML) hold			

==== 1991 general election ====
Candidate	Party	Votes	%
Madan Bhandari	CPN (UML)	27,372	50.70
Krishna Prasad Bhattarai	Nepali Congress	26,621	49.30
Total		53,993	100.00
CPN (UML) gain			

== See also ==
- List of parliamentary constituencies of Nepal
