= Kathmandu 2 =

Parliamentary constituency in Nepal

- Parliamentary constituency for the House of Representatives
- Kathmandu 2 in Bagmati Province

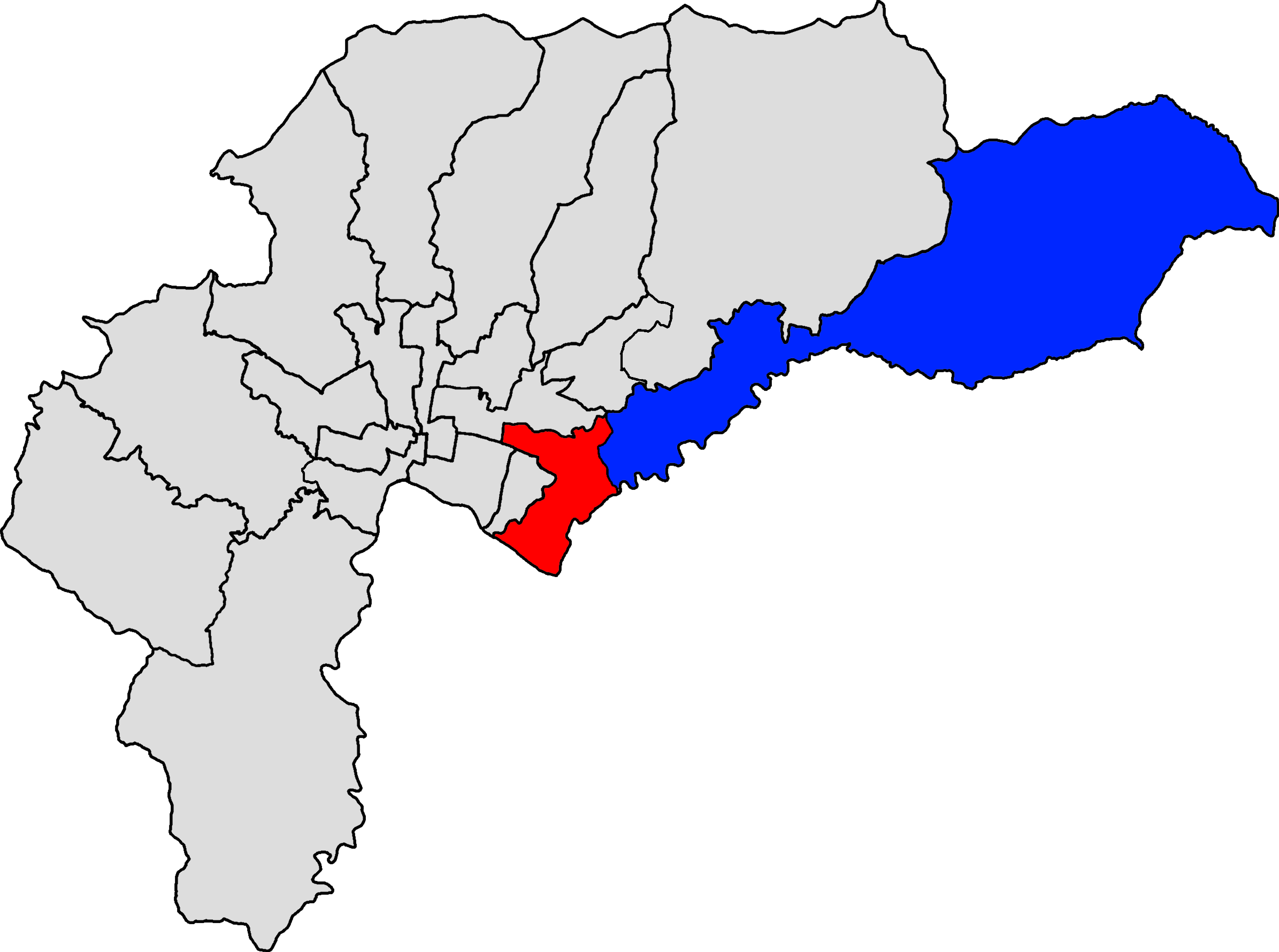
- Assembly segment Kathmandu 2(A) (red) and Kathmandu 2(B) (blue) within Kathmandu District
- Province: Bagmati Province
- District: Kathmandu District
- Electorate: 88,708
- Major settlements: Koteshwor, Pepsicola, Sankhu

Current constituency
- Created: 1991
- Party: Rastriya Swatantra Party
- Member of Parliament: Sunil K.C.
- Municipalities: Kageshwari-Manohara Municipality, Kathmandu Metropolitan City (some wards), Shankharapur Municipality (some wards)

Kathmandu 2 is one of 10 parliamentary constituencies of Kathmandu District in Nepal. Kathmandu 2(A) consisting Koteshwor and Pepsicola of Kathmandu Metropolitan City. Kathmandu 2(B) consisting areas of Kageshwari-Manohara Municipality and Shankharapur Municipality. This constituency came into existence on the Constituency Delimitation Commission (CDC) report submitted on 31 August 2017.

== Incorporated areas ==
Kathmandu 2 parliamentary constituency consists Koteshwor and Pepsicola of Kathmandu Metropolitan City ward 32 and 9 also. Along with Shankharapur Municipality wards 9 and wards 4, 5, 6, 7, 8 and 9 of Kageshwari-Manohara Municipality.

== Assembly segments ==
It encompasses the following Bagmati Province Provincial Assembly segment

- Kathmandu 2(A)
- Kathmandu 2(B)

== Members of Parliament ==
=== Parliament/Constituent Assembly ===
Election	Member	Party
1991	Daman Nath Dhungana	Nepali Congress
1994	Bidya Devi Bhandari	CPN (UML)
2008	Jhakku Prasad Subedi	CPN (Maoist)
January 2009	Jhakku Prasad Subedi	UCPN (Maoist)
2013	Madhav Kumar Nepal	CPN (Unified Marxist–Leninist)
2014 by-election	Deepak Prasad Kuikel	Nepali Congress
2017	Madhav Kumar Nepal	CPN (Unified Marxist–Leninist)
May 2018	Madhav Kumar Nepal	Nepal Communist Party
March 2021	Madhav Kumar Nepal	CPN (Unified Marxist–Leninist)
August 2021	Madhav Kumar Nepal	CPN (Unified Socialist)
2022	Sobita Gautam	Rastriya Swatantra Party
2026	Sunil K.C.	Rastriya Swatantra Party

=== Provincial Assembly ===
==== 2(A) ====
Election	Member	Party
2017	Sanu Kumar Shrestha	CPN (Unified Marxist–Leninist)
May 2018	Sanu Kumar Shrestha	Nepal Communist Party

==== 2(B) ====
Election	Member	Party
2017	Maniram Phuyal	CPN (Unified Marxist–Leninist)
May 2018	Maniram Phuyal	Nepal Communist Party

== Election results ==
=== Election in the 2020s ===
==== 2026 general election ====
Candidate	Party	Votes	%
Sunil K.C.	Rastriya Swatantra Party	34,238	60.05
Kabir Sharma	Nepali Congress	8,874	15.56
Kunti Devi Pokharel (Upadhyaya)	Rastriya Prajatantra Party	5,210	9.14
Maniram Phuyal	CPN (UML)	4,759	8.35
Nitesh Paudel	Nepali Communist Party	1,912	3.35
Pawan Pokharel	Ujyaalo Nepal Party	895	1.57
Mukunda Karki	Shram Sanskriti Party	588	1.03
Anup Bohara	Rastriya Pariwartan Party	226	0.40
Others		313	0.55
Total		57,015	100.00
Valid votes		57,015	98.12
Invalid/blank votes		1,095	1.88
Total votes		58,110	100.00
Registered voters/turnout		88,708	65.51
Majority		25,364	
Rastriya Swatantra Party hold			

==== 2022 general election ====
Candidate	Party	Votes	%
Sobita Gautam	Rastriya Swatantra Party	15,238	29.99
Maniram Phuyal	CPN (UML)	11,566	22.76
Kunti Devi Pokharel (Upadhyaya)	Rastriya Prajatantra Party	11,024	21.69
Onsari Gharti Magar	CPN (Maoist Centre)	9,459	18.61
Others		3,530	6.95
Total		50,817	100.00
Majority		3,672	
Rastriya Swatantra Party gain			

=== Election in the 2010s ===
==== 2017 legislative elections ====
Candidate	Party	Votes	%
Madhav Kumar Nepal	CPN (UML)	27,366	53.39
Dipak Prasad Kuikel	Nepali Congress	14,903	29.08
Surya Raj Acharya	Bibeksheel Sajha Party	7,437	14.51
Others		1,549	3.02
Total		51,255	100.00
Valid votes		51,255	96.63
Invalid/blank votes		1,790	3.37
Total votes		53,045	100.00
Registered voters/turnout		74,755	70.96
Majority		12,463	
CPN (UML) gain			

==== 2017 Nepalese provincial elections ====
===== Kathmandu 2(A) =====
Candidate	Party	Votes	%
Sanu Kumar Shrestha	CPN (UML)	8,936	45.11
Lokesh Dhakal	Nepali Congress	5,758	29.07
Rishika Bhattarai	Bibeksheel Sajha Party	4,682	23.63
Others		434	2.19
Total		19,810	100.00
Valid votes		19,810	98.96
Invalid/blank votes		208	1.04
Total votes		20,018	100.00
Registered voters/turnout		30,222	66.24
Majority		3,178	
CPN (UML) gain			

===== Kathmandu 2(B) =====
Candidate	Party	Votes	%
Maniram Phuyal	CPN (UML)	16,575	51.78
Manahari Khadka	Nepali Congress	8,268	25.83
Ramesh Napit	Rastriya Prajatantra Party	3,588	11.21
Keshav Paudel	Bibeksheel Sajha Party	2,660	8.31
Others		919	2.87
Total		32,010	100.00
Valid votes		32,010	99.06
Invalid/blank votes		303	0.94
Total votes		32,313	100.00
Registered voters/turnout		44,534	72.56
Majority		8,307	
CPN (UML) gain			

==== 2014 by-elections ====
Candidate	Party	Votes	%
Dipak Prasad Kuikel	Nepali Congress	18,200	41.60
Krishna Gopal Shrestha	CPN (UML)	13,421	30.68
Lila Mani Pokharel	UCPN (Maoist)	4,604	10.52
Navaraj Simkhada	Rastriya Prajatantra Party Nepal	3,724	8.51
Mijendra Kaji Shrestha	Rastriya Prajatantra Party	1,348	3.08
Others		2,451	5.60
Total		43,748	100.00
Valid votes		43,748	100.00
Invalid/blank votes		0	0.00
Total votes		43,748	100.00
Registered voters/turnout		65,745	66.54
Majority		4,779	
Nepali Congress gain			

==== 2013 Constituent Assembly election ====
Candidate	Party	Votes	%
Madhav Kumar Nepal	CPN (UML)	21,747	44.02
Pratima Gautam	Nepali Congress	12,479	25.26
Lila Mani Pokharel	UCPN (Maoist)	7,134	14.44
Navaraj Simkhada	Rastriya Prajatantra Party Nepal	5,358	10.85
Others		2,680	5.43
Total		49,398	100.00
Valid votes		49,398	96.67
Invalid/blank votes		1,704	3.33
Total votes		51,102	100.00
Registered voters/turnout		63,873	80.01
Majority		9,268	
CPN (UML) gain			

=== Election in the 2000s ===
==== 2008 Constituent Assembly election ====
Candidate	Party	Votes	%
Jhakku Prasad Subedi	CPN (Maoist)	13,858	32.17
Madhav Kumar Nepal	CPN (UML)	12,325	28.61
Deepak Prasad Kuikel	Nepali Congress	11,544	26.80
Deepak Meyar Shrestha	Rastriya Prajatantra Party	1,570	3.64
Navaraj Simkhada	Rastriya Prajatantra Party Nepal	1,569	3.64
Others		2,212	5.13
Total		43,078	100.00
Valid votes		43,078	95.91
Invalid/blank votes		1,836	4.09
Total votes		44,914	100.00
Registered voters/turnout		67,141	66.90
Majority		1,533	
CPN (Maoist) gain			
Source: Election Commission

=== Election in the 1990s ===
==== 1999 legislative elections ====
Candidate	Party	Votes	%
Bidya Devi Bhandari	CPN (UML)	12,552	37.04
Ambika Basnet	Nepali Congress	11,387	33.61
Jit Lama	CPN (Marxist–Leninist)	8,330	24.58
Others		1,615	4.77
Total		33,884	100.00
Valid votes		33,884	97.03
Invalid/blank votes		1,038	2.97
Total votes		34,922	100.00
Registered voters/turnout		63,796	54.74
Majority		1,165	
CPN (UML) hold			
Source: Election Commission

==== 1994 legislative elections ====
Candidate	Party	Votes	%
Bidya Devi Bhandari	CPN (UML)	21,763	57.23
Daman Nath Dhungana	Nepali Congress	13,064	34.35
Krishna Prasad Dahal	Rastriya Prajatantra Party	2,252	5.92
Others		948	2.49
Total		38,027	100.00
Majority		8,699	
CPN (UML) gain			
Source: Election Commission

==== 1991 legislative elections ====
Party	Candidate	Votes
Nepali Congress	Daman Nath Dhungana	23310
Samyukta Jana Morcha Nepal	Krishna Sundar Malla	19837
Result	Congress gain	

== See also ==
- List of parliamentary constituencies of Nepal
