= Miniland English High School =

Miniland English Secondary School
- मिनिल्यान्ड माध्यमिक विद्यालय
- Thali, Kageshwori Manohara, Kathmandu, Bagmati Province; Nepal

Information
- Type: Coeducational
- Motto: Discipline And Perseverance Leads To Supremacy
- Established: 1992
- Sister school: Ministeps Pre-School, Thali
- School board: National Examination Board (NEB)
- Chairperson: Jayaram Wagley
- Principal: Mani Ram Wagley
- Grades: 1 to +2
- Enrollment: approx ~1200 (2023)
- Average class size: ~40
- Nickname: MEHS/Miniland
- Website: https://www.minilandschool.edu.np

Miniland English Secondary School, a privately owned institution with a history of more than thirty-three years, is located in Thali, Kageshwari-Manohara, Ward No 5 in the suburb of Kathmandu city. It offers education across levels of Kindergarten to School Leaving Certificate level.

== Buildings ==
The school has junior wing and senior wing. Junior students used to be taught in old building in Thali while senior students are taught in new building in Sano Thali. After 2015 Nepal Earthquake the junior wing is also moved to the new building in Sano Thali. It consists of Pre-Primary Wing Named, "Mini Steps" near to the main building.

== Curriculum ==
The Primary School consists of classes 1 to 5. In addition to oral work, activities, games, practicals, excursions etc., students are taught subjects like English, Nepali, Mathematics, Science, Social Studies, Computer Studies, Moral Science, General Knowledge and Health Education. Co-curricular activities such as singing, dance and instrumental music are taught.

The Lower Secondary School consists of classes 6 to 8. Besides English, Nepali, Mathematics, Science, Social Studies, Computer Studies, Moral Science, General Knowledge, the students are introduced to advanced level Mathematics and E. P. H. (Environment Health & Population) Co-curricular activities also includes Club activities.

The Secondary School consists of classes 9 and 10. The HMG (S. L. C.) curricular is followed in these classes. The students, however, take part in co-curricular activities and club activities. They are also introduced to a course in Advanced Level English.

== Involvement ==
Miniland is actively involved in social work and human activities. Regular Scout training and field movement is done. There is the Rain Gauge station in Miniland which is installed in collaboration with CORAM Nepal an NGO working on Climate monitoring.
