= Pradeep Nepal =

Nepali politician and writer (1954–2025)

Honourable Pradeep Nepal
- प्रदीप नेपाल

Minister for Information and Communication
- In office 30 November 1994 – 12 September 1995
- Monarch: King Birendra
- Prime Minister: Man Mohan Adhikari
- Constituency: National Assembly

Personal details
- Born: January 1954 Gogane, Bhojpur, Nepal
- Died: 6 May 2025 (aged 71) Kathmandu, Nepal
- Party: Communist Party of Nepal (Unified Socialist) (2021–2025)
- Other political affiliations: Communist Party of Nepal (Unified Marxist–Leninist) (1990–2025)

Pradeep Nepal (January 1954 – 6 May 2025) was a Nepali politician and writer. He was affiliated with the Communist Party of Nepal (Unified Marxist–Leninist) for most of his political career, later joining the Communist Party of Nepal (Unified Socialist). He held various ministerial portfolios including Information and Communication, Water Resources, Health, and Education.

== Early life ==
Nepal was born in January 1954 in Gogane village of Bhojpur district, Nepal. During the Panchayat era, he was involved in the democratic movement and was imprisoned multiple times. While underground, he wrote literary works under the pen name "Sanjay Thapa."

== Political career ==
Nepal served as Minister for Information and Communication in 1994 under the leadership of Prime Minister Man Mohan Adhikari. He also held the portfolios of Water Resources, Health, and Education in different administrations. In the 2008 Constituent Assembly election, he ran from Kathmandu-1 but was defeated by Prakash Man Singh of the Nepali Congress. He was a politburo member of CPN-UML until his death.

== Literary contribution ==
In addition to his political career, Nepal was a prolific writer. He authored 16 novels and 10 collections of short stories. His notable works include Barbarik, Deshko Khoji, and Deumai Ko Kinara Ma.

== Death ==
Nepal died in Kathmandu on 6 May 2025, at the age of 71. He had been suffering from Parkinson's disease for several years. Political leaders and the public paid tributes to his political and literary contributions.
