= Daanchhi =

Danchhi डाँछी
- Village of Kageshwari-Manohara Municipality
- Nicknames: Thali, Danchhi
- Location in Nepal
- Coordinates: 27.73°N 85.41°E
- Country: Nepal
- Province: No. 3
- District: Kathmandu

Government
  - Type: Municipality
  - Member of Parliament: Madhav Kumar Nepal
  - Mayor: Krishna Hari Thapa

Population (2011)
  - Total: 11,246
- Time zone: UTC+5:45 (Nepal Time)
- Postal code: 44600
- Area code: 01
- Website: https://www.kageshworimanoharamun.gov.np/en

Danchhi is a part of Kageshwari-Manohara Municipality in Kathmandu District in Province No. 3 of central Nepal. At the time of the 2011 Nepal census, it had a population of 11,246 and had 2,593 households in it. Danchhi is now included in Kageswori Manohara Municipality. Danchhi/Thali is bounded by Bagmati and Manohara river. The major places include Thali/थली, Nayapati, Bhadrawas, Hariyalinagar, Dumakhal, and Gajarkot. The major government schools are Shree Sahid Aadarsha Uchha MaVi, Shree Kanti Bhairab MaVi, and Shree Chaulanarayan PraVi. Private schools include Miniland English High School, Mount Everest Secondary School, Pragya Sadan School, Alpine Academy, and Hindu Vidhya Peeth.

Kathmandu valley outer ringroad will pass through this place.

== Toponymy ==
=== Language origin ===
- Linguistic family: Indoeuropean
- Language: Sanskrit

=== Etymology ===
"Daan" means offering, donation, or charity. "Chhi/Chi" may be a toponymic suffix denoting place or settlement. Therefore, Daanchhi could be interpreted as "the place of offerings" or "the village of charity."

Daan (दान) means "gift, donation, offering" and comes from Sanskrit दान (dāna) meaning "act of giving, alms, donation. -chhi / -chi (छि / ची) is likely a local or regional suffix for place names, possibly of Tibeto-Burman substrate origin, adapted into Nepali toponymy.

The toponym Daanchhi thus probably means "settlement of giving/offering," combining a Sanskrit lexical root with a local place-forming suffix.

== Industries and Economy ==
- Korean Company
- Gokarna Forest Resort
- Kumari Bank
- NIC Asia Bank
- Kanti Bhairab Hume Pipe Pvt Ltd

== Hindu temples ==
- Ganesh Temple, Nayagaun
- Kolmateswor Temple, Simkhadagaun
- RadhaKrishna Temple, Thali
- Vimadevi Temple, Thali
- Dumadevi Temple, Dumakhal
- KANTI BHAIRAB TEMPLE, DANCHHI

== Tourist attractions ==
- Bhimbadi Danda
- Gokarna Forest Golf Resort https://gokarna.com/
- Sahid Bann Batika
- Firfire Danda
- Simkhadagaun Pani Tanki
- Danchhi Pani Tanki
