= Sinamangal =

Sinamangal सिनामंगल
- Neighborhood in Kathmandu
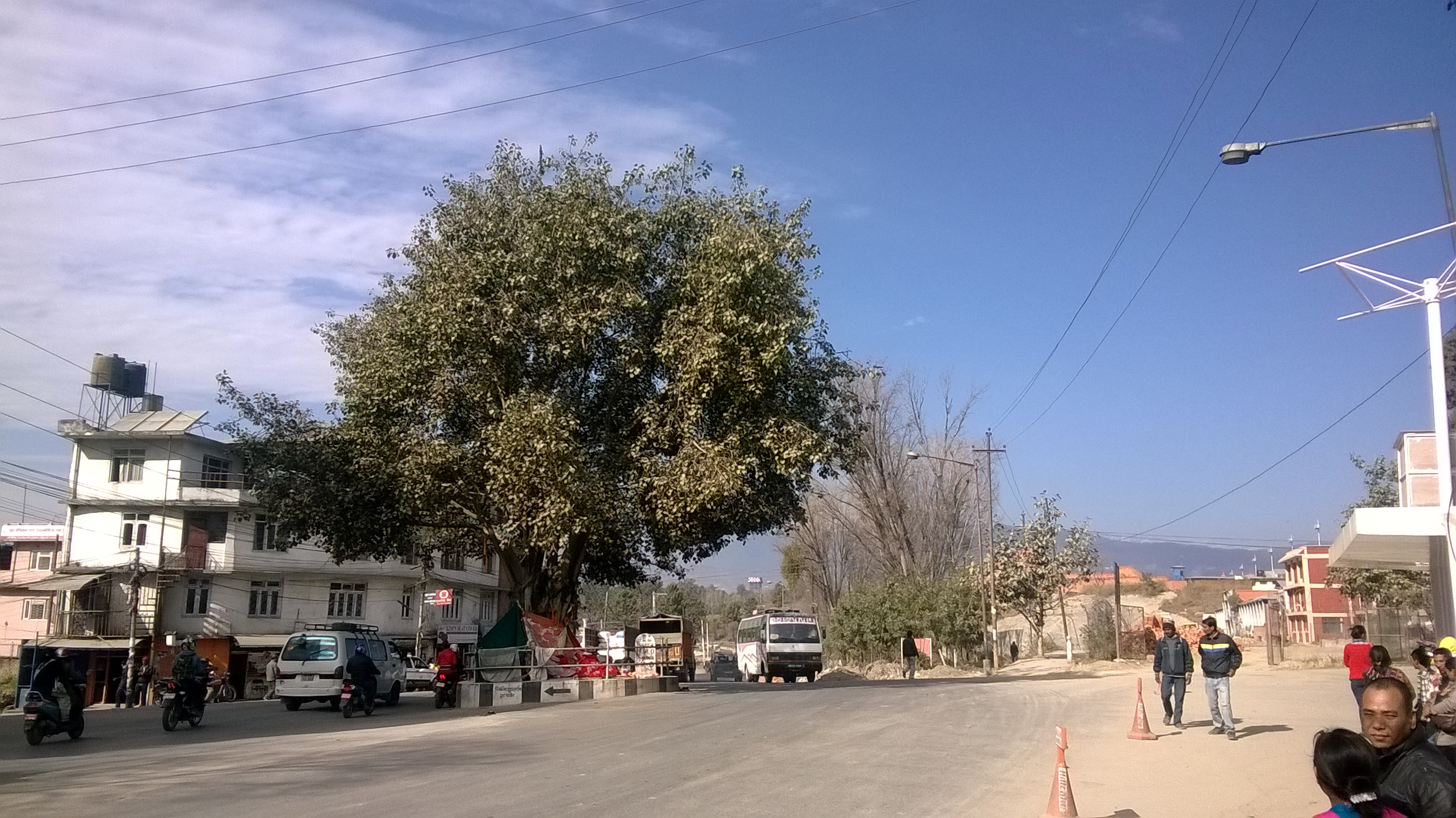
- View of road in Sinamangal

- Location in Kathmandu
- Coordinates: 27°41′57″N 85°21′04″E
- Country: Nepal
- Province: Bagmati Province
- District: Kathmandu District
- City: Kathmandu
- Time zone: UTC+5:45 (Nepal Time)

Sinamangal (Nepali: सिनामंगल) (also Kathmandu Metropolitan City Ward 09) is a residential area of Kathmandu, the capital city of Nepal, on the banks of Bagmati River. It borders Baneshwor and Gaucharan. Tribhuvan International Airport located in Sinamangal divides Eastern side Purano Sinamangal (Pepsicola) from Western side Sinamangal both belonging to Kathmandu Metropolitan City. One of the residential area of Kathmandu, Pepsicola Town planning is located in Purano Sinamangal.

== Transportation ==
Sinamangal is served by various routes of public transportation. Sajha Yatayat and Mahanagar Yatayat run their buses along routes that connect to Sinamangal via the Ring Road, a major highway in Kathmandu. Digo Yatayat and electric Safa Tempos operate in the inner roads of Sinamangal, providing connectivity to places like Ratnapark.
