= Prakash Man Singh =

Nepalese politician

Honourable Prakash Man Singh MP
- प्रकाश मान सिंह
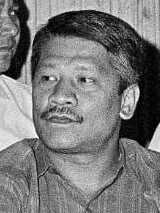
- Singh in 2019

Deputy Prime Minister of Nepal
- In office 15 July 2024 – 9 September 2025 Serving with Bishnu Prasad Paudel
- President: Ram Chandra Paudel
- Prime Minister: K. P. Sharma Oli
- Preceded by: Raghubir Mahaseth; Narayan Kaji Shrestha; Rabi Lamichhane; Upendra Yadav
- Succeeded by: Vacant
- In office 25 February 2014 – 12 October 2015 Serving with Bam Dev Gautam
- President: Ram Baran Yadav
- Prime Minister: Sushil Koirala
- Preceded by: Bijay Kumar Gachhadar; Narayan Kaji Shrestha; Krishna Prasad Sitaula; Ishwar Pokhrel
- Succeeded by: Bijay Kumar Gachhadar; Kamal Thapa; Bhim Bahadur Rawal; Chandra Prakash Mainali; Chitra Bahadur K.C. Top Bahadur Rayamajhi
Ministerial positions
Minister of Urban Development of Nepal
In office 15 July 2024 – 9 September 2025
| President | Ram Chandra Paudel |
| Prime Minister | K. P. Sharma Oli |
| Preceded by | Dhan Bahadur Buda |
| Succeeded by | Kul Man Ghising |
Minister of Federal Affairs and Local Development of Nepal
In office 25 February 2014 – 12 October 2015
| President | Ram Baran Yadav |
| Prime Minister | Sushil Koirala |
| Preceded by | Bidyadhar Mallik |
| Succeeded by | Kamal Thapa |
Minister of Physical Planning and Construction of Nepal
In office 10 June 2004 – 1 February 2005
| Monarch | Gyanendra |
| Prime Minister | Sher Bahadur Deuba |
| Preceded by | Budhhiman Tamang |
| Succeeded by | Kirti Nidhi Bista |
Minister of Supplies of Nepal
In office 31 May 1999 – 20 March 2000
| Monarch | Birendra |
| Prime Minister | Krishna Prasad Bhattarai |
| Preceded by | Khum Bahadur Khadka |
| Succeeded by | Ram Krishna Tamrakar |
Minister of Local Development of Nepal
In office 21 April 1998 – 26 August 1998
| Monarch | Birendra |
| Prime Minister | Girija Prasad Koirala |
| Preceded by | Gajendra Narayan Singh |
| Succeeded by | Amrit Kumar Bohara |
Minister of Population and Environment of Nepal
In office 3 December 1997 – 12 April 1998
| Monarch | Birendra |
| Prime Minister | Surya Bahadur Thapa |
| Preceded by | Bidya Devi Bhandari |
| Succeeded by | Ambika Sanwa |
In office 13 December 1995 – 10 March 1997
| Monarch | Birendra |
| Prime Minister | Sher Bahadur Deuba |
| Preceded by | Office established |
| Succeeded by | Bidya Devi Bhandari |
Other senior positions
Vic Presidents of the Nepali Congress
In office 1996–2010 Serving with Ram Chandra Poudel and Gopal Man Shrestha
| President | Girija Prasad Koirala |
| Succeeded by | Bimalendra Nidhi; Bijay Kumar Gachhadar |
General Secretary of the Nepali Congress
In office 2010–2016 Serving with Krishna Prasad Sitaula
| President | Sushil Koirala |
| Preceded by | Ram Baran Yadav; Kul Bahadur Gurung; Bimalendra Nidhi |
| Succeeded by | Shashanka Koirala; Purna Bahadur Khadka |

Member of Parliament, Pratinidhi Sabha
- In office 4 March 2018 – 12 September 2025
- Preceded by: Himself (as member of the Legislature Parliament)
- Succeeded by: Ranju Darshana (elect)
- Constituency: Kathmandu 1

Member of the Constituent Assembly / Legislature Parliament
- In office 28 May 2008 – 14 October 2017
- Preceded by: Pradeep Nepal
- Succeeded by: Himself (as member of the House of Representatives)
- Constituency: Kathmandu 1

Member of Parliament, Rastriya Sabha
- In office 13 November 1995 – 27 June 2001

Personal details
- Born: 3 April 1956 (age 70) Chhetrapati, Kathmandu
- Party: Nepali Congress
- Children: Prabhash Man Singh and Bhaskar Man Singh
- Parents: Ganesh Man Singh (father); Mangala Devi Singh (mother)
- Education: Master's Degree in Statistics

Prakash Man Singh (Nepali: प्रकाश मान सिंह) is a Nepalese politician and a leader of the Nepali Congress and former Deputy Prime Minister of Nepal. He is the son of Nepali politician Ganesh Man Singh. He has also been the Minister of Local Development and Federalism in Sushil Koirala's Cabinet.

== Political career ==
Singh contested the Kathmandu-4 constituency in the 1991 parliamentary election. Singh won 36.13% of the votes in the constituency, but was defeated by Sahana Pradhan of the Communist Party of Nepal (United Marxist-Leninist) (CPN(UML)).

In the 1994 parliamentary election, he contested the Kathmandu-3 constituency. Singh won 33.77% of the votes in the constituency, but was defeated by the CPN(UML) candidate Manmohan Adhikari. Singh was Minister for Population and Environment in Sher Bahadur Deuba's cabinet formed in 1996. He later became Minister for Supplies in Krishna Prasad Bhattarai's cabinet.

In the split in the Nepali Congress, Singh sided with the break-away Nepali Congress (Democratic). Singh became vice-president of NC(D). Singh also became Minister for Physical Planning and Construction in Sher Bahadur Deuba's cabinet.

Singh was removed from his ministerial position when King Gyanendra took power in February 2005. In February 2005, Singh was arrested for two weeks. Singh was again arrested on April 21, 2005, after refusing to appear for a hearing of the Royal Commission for Corruption Control. Singh, along with Sher Bahadur Deuba, were accused by the RCCC of involvement in a case of corruption relating to the Melamchi Drinking Water Project. Singh had refused to appear in front of the RCCC, as he considering the institution as unconstitutional. In July 2005, Singh and Deuba were sentenced to 2 years in jail and a fine of 90 million rupees. Singh was released from jail on February 13, 2006, as the Supreme Court of Nepal ordered the dissolution of the RCCC.

After the fall of King Gyanendra's direct rule, Singh became a nominated member of the new interim legislature.

After the reunification of NC and NC(D), Singh became vice president of Nepali Congress.

In 2008, he won the Kathmandu-1 seat in the Constituent Assembly election, being the first candidate to be declared a winner. Singh obtained 14318 votes.

In the 12th General convention of the Party held on September 22, 2010, Singh was elected as General Secretary of the Party defeating rival candidate Bimalendra Nidhi from Deuba Camp.

Singh, the son of Ganesh Man Singh fielded candidacy for the post of party president leaving the camp in the 14th general convention of Nepali Congress. He was able to garner 7% votes opening the way for second round of election as Deuba who obtained 48% votes was unable to cross 50%. Later, Deuba asked Bimalendra Nidhi and Singh for support while Singh said he was ready to support Deuba. With this, Deuba and Singh came together after almost 12 years.

He was forced to relinquish all political offices during the 2025 Nepalese Gen Z protests. His residence in the Chaksibari district of Kathmandu along with six of his cars were burned down by a mob of protesters. He and his family were able to flee to safety with the help of the Nepalese Army.

== Electoral history ==
2022 general election

| Candidate | Party | Votes | % | +/– |
|---|---|---|---|---|
| Prakash Man Singh | Nepali Congress | 7,143 | 27.30 | –12.21 |
| Rabindra Mishra | Rastriya Prajatantra Party | 7,018 | 26.82 | New |
| Pukar Bam | Rastriya Swatantra Party | 4,115 | 15.73 | New |
| Kiran Paudel | CPN (UML) | 3,532 | 13.50 | New |
| Ramesh Kharel | Nepal Sushasan Party | 3,124 | 11.94 | New |
| Others | | 1,234 | 4.72 | –46.77 |
| Total | | 26,166 | 100.00 | – |
| Majority | | 125 | | |
| Nepali Congress hold | | | | |

=== 2017 legislative elections ===
Kathmandu-1
| Party | Candidate | Votes |
|---|---|---|
| Nepali Congress | Prakash Man Singh | 10,936 |
| Bibeksheel Sajha Party | Rabindra Mishra | 10,118 |
| CPN (Maoist Centre) | Anil Sharma | 5,336 |
| Others | | 1,292 |
| Invalid votes | | 593 |
| Result | Congress hold | |
Source: Election Commission

=== 2013 Constituent Assembly election ===
Kathmandu-1
| Party | Candidate | Votes |
|---|---|---|
| Nepali Congress | Prakash Man Singh | 15,138 |
| CPN (Maoist Centre) | Renu Dahal | 4,064 |
| Rastriya Prajatantra Party Nepal | Bharat Mani Jangam | 3,732 |
| CPN (Unified Marxist-Leninist) | Bidhya Neupane | 3,501 |
| Others | | 2,499 |
| Result | Congress hold | |
Source: Election Commission

=== 2008 Constituent Assembly election ===
Kathmandu-1
| Party | Candidate | Votes |
|---|---|---|
| Nepali Congress | Prakash Man Singh | 14,318 |
| CPN (Unified Marxist-Leninist) | Pradip Nepal | 6,789 |
| CPN (Maoist Centre) | Ram Man Shrestha | 4,836 |
| Rastriya Prajatantra Party Nepal | Gobinda Lamichhane | 1,042 |
| Others | | 3,336 |
| Result | Congress gain | |
Source: Election Commission

=== 1994 legislative elections ===
Kathmandu-3
| Party | Candidate | Votes |
|---|---|---|
| CPN (Unified Marxist–Leninist) | Man Mohan Adhikari | 15,642 |
| Nepali Congress | Prakash Man Singh | 11,378 |
| Rastriya Prajatantra Party | Jaya Kumar Khadka | 4,453 |
| Rastriya Jana Parishad | Kirti Nidhi Bista | 1,180 |
| Others | | 755 |
| Result | CPN (UML) hold | |
Source: Election Commission

=== 1991 legislative elections ===
Kathmandu-4
| Party | Candidate | Votes |
|---|---|---|
| CPN (Unified Marxist-Leninist) | Sahana Pradhan | 28,630 |
| Nepali Congress | Prakash Man Singh | 19,504 |
| Result | CPN (UML) gain | |

== See also ==
- Nepali Congress (Deuba Faction)
