= Aalapot =

Place in Nepal

Aalapot आलापोट Village
- Municipality of Kageshwari-Manohara Municipality ward-02
- Location in Nepal
- Coordinates: 27°45′0″N 85°25′48″E
- Country: Nepal
- Province: Bagmati Province
- District: Kathmandu District

Population (2011)
  - Total: 3,159
  - Religions: Hindu
- Time zone: UTC+5:45 (Nepal Time)

Kageshwori Manohara Municipality (Kageshwori Nagarpalika, Nepali: कागेश्वरी मनोहरा नगरपालिका) was incorporated on Mangsir 16, 2071 (2nd Dec. 2014) as the decision of the council of ministers of Government of Nepal. It was formed by combining six village development committees: Gothatar, Mulpani, Danchhi, Bhadrabas, Alapot, and Gagalfedi. Kathmandu valley comprises three cities: Kathmandu, Bhaktapur, and Lalitpur. Kageshwori Manohara is one of the municipalities situated at northeast of Kathmandu.

Name Native District Population Census 2001-05-28 Population Census 2011-06-22 Aalapot आलापोट Kathmandu 2,884 3,159 Aalapot

3,159 Population [2011] – Census

1.470 km2 Area

2,148/km2 Population Density [2011]

0.91% Annual Population Change [2001 → 2011]

Aalapot: human settlement in Nepal

Aalapot is located near Sundarijal, Bhadrabas and Gokarna, north east of Kathmandu.

== Toponymy ==
=== Linguistic origin ===
- Linguistic family: Indoeuropean
- Language: Farsi, Sanskrit

=== Etymology ===
According to local belief, the name is due to the fact that it was a place where potatoes (aalu) were found. It is formed from aalu (potato) and kot (fortress or fort). In the past, many potatoes were cultivated here, and the place developed as a fortification.

The term aalu in Nepali comes from the Hindi आलू (ālū), which in turn is a loanword from Persian آلو (âlû), originally meaning “fruit” or “plum,” but in the Indian subcontinent it came to specifically refer to the potato introduced by Europeans.

Kot comes from Sanskrit कोट (koṭa), which means “wall,” “rampart,” or “fort,” and is found in many Indo-Aryan languages (Hindi, Marathi, Bengali, etc.).
