= Purano Sinamangal =

Neighbourhood in Kathmandu

Purano Sinamangal (Pepsicola) पुरानो सिनामंगल (पेप्सिकोला)
- Neighbourhood
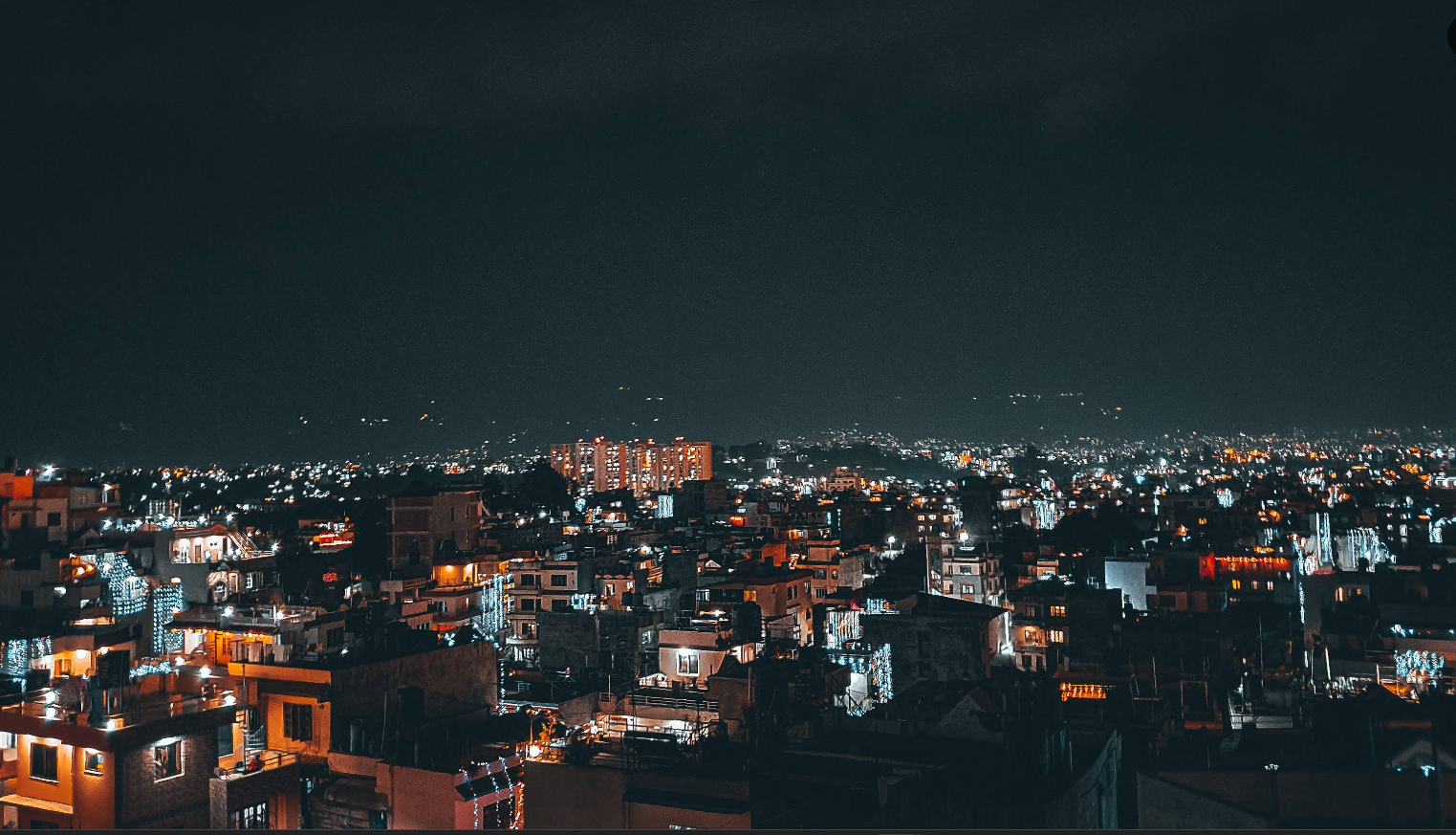
- Night view of Pepsicola from Hattidada, Gothatar

- Location in Kathmandu
- Coordinates: 27°41′39″N 85°22′01″E
- Country: Nepal
- Province: Bagmati
- District: Kathmandu
- Municipality: Kathmandu and Kageshwori Manohara
- Area: Kathmandu and Kageshwori Manohara
- Ward No.: 32 and 09

Area
  - Total: 1.20 km^{2} (0.46 sq mi)
- Time zone: UTC+05:45 (Nepal Standard Time)
- Postal code: 44600

Purano Sinamangal or Pepsicola is a residential and commercial area in the eastern part of Kathmandu, Nepal. It falls under both the Kathmandu Metropolitan City and some parts of Kageshwori Manohara Ward 9. It encompasses 130 hectares and is bounded by the Manohara river in the south east, and share borders with Gothatar in the north, Madhyapur Thimi municipality of Bhaktapur District in south east.

== History ==
Purano Sinamangal has historical significance due to its proximity to Tribhuvan International Airport and the Bagmati River. Over time, it has developed into a densely populated area with residential buildings, businesses, and educational institutions. Purano Sinamangal previously a part of Gothatar VDC but was divided into Kathmandu Metropolitan City and Kageshwori Manohara after rearrangement. At the time of the 1991 Nepal census it had a population of approx 15,000 living in 500 households.

== Landmarks ==
Notable landmarks include:

- Pepsicola Chowk – a major intersection and commercial hub
- Khahare – A sub-locality within Pepsicola, known for its residential areas and small businesses
- Suncity Apartments – a residential complex
- Pepsicola Football Ground – a venue for local football matches, with restaurants in the area

== Education ==
Purano Sinamangal is home to several well-known educational institutions, including:

- Gateway Academy
- Nexus International Academy
- Aksharaa School
- Panini School
- Gandhi Aadarsha Secondary School

== Healthcare ==
Purano Sinamangal has several well-known healthcare institutions, including:

- Motherland Hospital
- Gandhi Tulasi Manohara Community Hospital

== Banking and Finance ==
Several major banks have branches in Purano Sinamangal, including:

- Nepal Investment Mega Bank
- Global IME Bank Limited
- Sanima Bank
- Prabhu Bank
- Nabil Bank
- NIC Asia Bank

== See also ==
- Kathmandu Metropolitan City
- Kageshwori Manohara
- Bagmati River
- Tribhuvan International Airport
- Kathmandu
