= Gagalphedi =

Gagalphedi गागलफेदी
- Village of Kageshwari-Manohara Municipality
- Location in Nepal
- Coordinates: 27°45′57″N 85°26′33″E
- Country: Nepal
- Province: No. 3
- District: Kathmandu

Population (2011)
  - Total: 5,533
- Time zone: UTC+5:45 (Nepal Time)

Gapalphedi is a village and former Village Development Committee that is now part of Kageshwari-Manohara Municipality in Kathmandu District in Province No. 3 of central Nepal. At the time of the 2011 Nepal census it had a population of 5,533 and had 1,166 households in it.
