= Sunil K.C. =

Nepalese Politician

- सुनिल के.सी.

Member of Parliament, Pratinidhi Sabha
- Elected
- Assumed office 27 March 2026
- Preceded by: Sobita Gautam
- Constituency: Kathmandu 2

Personal details
- Citizenship: Nepalese
- Party: Rastriya Swatantra Party
- Profession: Politician

Sunil K.C. (Note: Nepali: सुनिल के.सी.) is a Nepalese politician serving as a member of parliament from the Rastriya Swatantra Party. He is the member of the 3rd Federal Parliament of Nepal elected from Kathmandu 2 constituency in 2026 Nepalese General Election securing 34,238 votes and defeating Kabir Sharma of the Nepali Congress.
