= Lokesh Dhakal =

Lokesh Dhakal is a leader in the Nepali Congress. Born in Kathmandu, Dhakal has been associated with many social organizations. He is the founder chairman of Lumbini Academic Foundation and is always involved in social activities, charities, and great entertainer.

His regular article are published in Nepal Samacharpatra daily and Deshantar weekly in Nepal. He has written various books like Anugunhan and Apurna Kranti.
