= Bhadrabas =

Bhadrabas भद्रवास
- Village of Kageshwari-Manohara Municipality
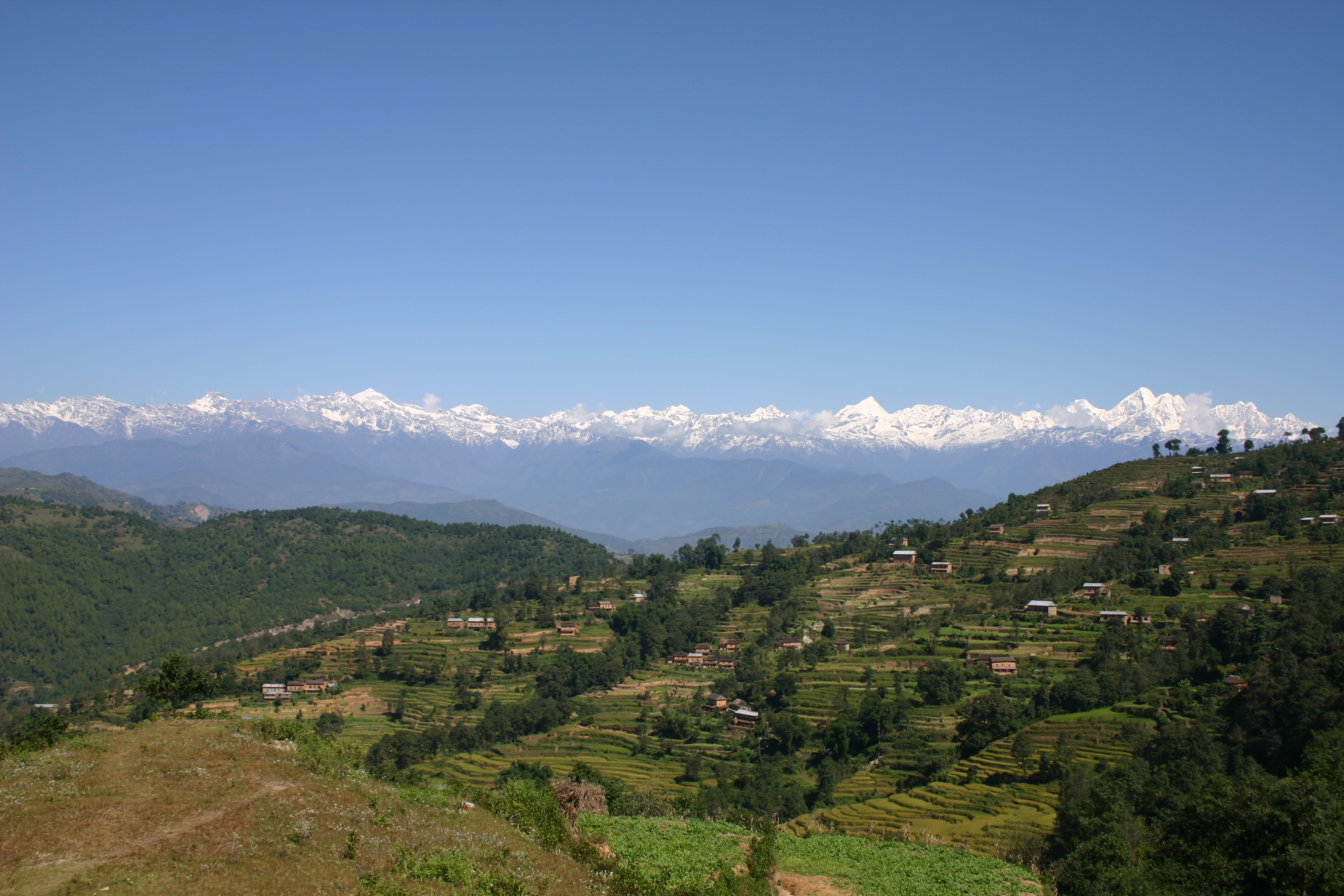
- Kathmandu Valley

- Location in Nepal
- Coordinates: 27°44′24″N 85°25′48″E
- Country: Nepal
- Province: No. 3
- District: Kathmandu

Population (2011)
  - Total: 2,388
  - Religions: Hindu
- Time zone: UTC+5:45 (Nepal Time)

Bhadrabas is a village and former Village Development Committee that is now part of Kageshwari-Manohara Municipality in Kathmandu District in Province No. 3 of central Nepal, located approximately 15 kilometres (9 mi) northeast of Kathmandu. At the time of the 2011 Nepal census it had a population of 2,388 and had 503 houses in it. The oldest high school in the eastern Kathmandu Valley, Adarsh Madhayamik Vidhalaya is located in Bhadrabas. The Nepal Red Cross Society is active in Bhadrabas and it has notable health centre. In 1984, a tobacco smoking World Health Organization questionnaire was given to the inhabitants of Bhadrabas to survey smoking trends in the country.

Vertebrate fossil remains have been found northeast of the village.

== Toponymy ==
=== Linguistic origin ===
- Linguistic family: Indoeuropean
- Language: Sanskrit

=== Etymology ===
“Bhadra” means refined, virtuous, or civilized. “Bas” means dwelling place or settlement. It is said that the place was named as such because it was inhabited by noble, peaceful, and respectable people.

Bhadra (भद्र) means “noble, virtuous, refined” and comes from Sanskrit भद्र (bhadra) with the same meanings. Vas (वास) means “residence, dwelling, place to stay” and comes from Sanskrit वास (vāsa). In compound form, it becomes -bas in modern Nepali toponymy.
