= Gothatar =

Gothatar गोठाटार
- Village of Kageshwari-Manohara Municipality
- Nickname: Bhaimal
- Location in Nepal
- Coordinates: 27.70°N 85.38°E
- Country: Nepal
- Province: No. 3
- District: Kathmandu
- Established: 1939 B.s

Government

Population (2011)
  - Total: 26,169
- Time zone: UTC+5:45 (Nepal Time)

Gothatar is a village and former Village Development Committee that is now part of Kageshwari-Manohara Municipality in Kathmandu District in Province No. 3 of central Nepal. It is divided into three wards: 7, 8, and 9. Previously there were 9 wards when it was the Village Development Committee but now it has been changed to Municipality and divided. Old wards 1, 2, 3, and 4 have been changed to ward number 8. Old ward number 5, 6, 7 have been changed to ward number 7 combined with Mulpani and ward number 8, and 9 have been changed to ward number 9 under Kageshwori Manohara Municipality. At the time of the 2011 Nepal census it had a population of 26,169 and had 6,749 households in it. The Bagmati bridge on the north side connects Gothatar with the roadway to Jorpati. The roadway to the west side connects with Old Sinamangal (Pepsicola) via the road to Jadibuti the east side roadway connects to Mulpani, and the south side borders Kathmandu and Bhaktapur.

One of the major attractions in Gothatar is the Krishna Parnami Mandir. Historically, there was a palace named Manohara Durbar, built in 1879 by Commanding General Jagat Jung Rana, the son of Jung Bahadur Rana. It served as his private residence. However, the palace no longer exists.

As local people said the name Gothatar is derived from the word “गोठ” (cattle house) of the Rana family. Between 2007 and 2010, the population density increased rapidly as more houses were constructed. The majority of Gothatar’s population consists of Hindu Brahmins and Kshetris, with many natives still engaging in farming and maintaining cowsheds despite the proximity to metropolitan Kathmandu.

There is often confusion between Gothatar and Kadaghari, but Kadaghari falls under Gothatar. Gothatar has maintained its unique identity since ancient times.

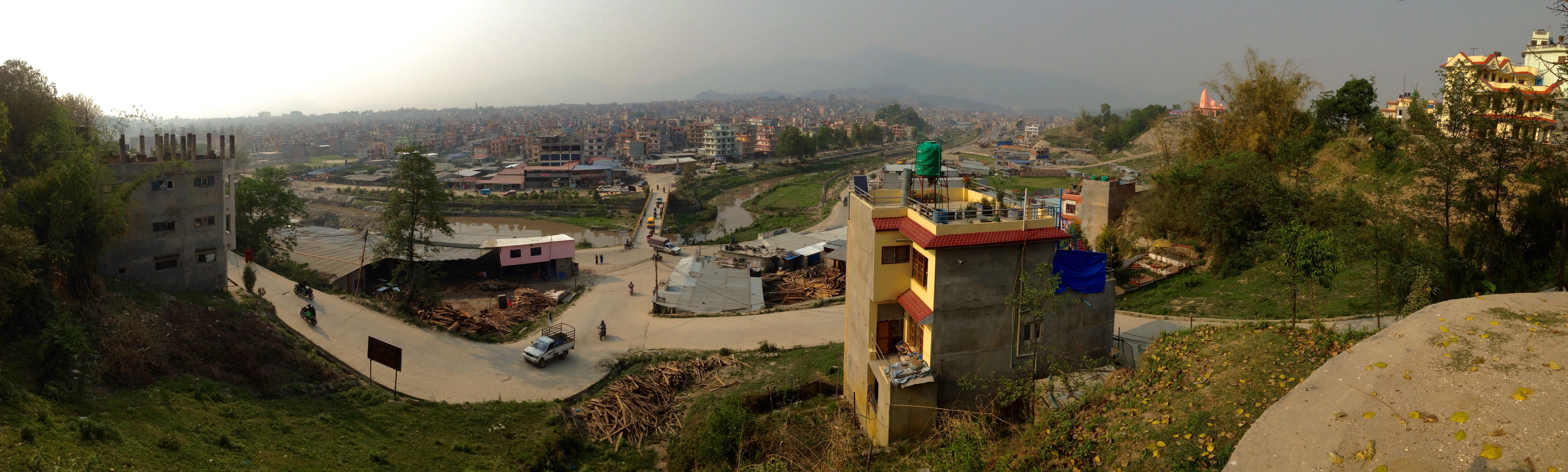
View from Gothatar Height

The public transportation in this area mainly consists of Nepal Yatayat and much more transportation has been added like Gothatar Yatayat, Riddhi Siddhi Yatayat, and Force bus transportation, On a clear day, a panorama of the Ganesh Himal can be seen from here. And you can see a clear view of Phulchowki tower. Tribhuvan International Airport also joins Gothatar and you can see that the part of Airport radar area that part was taken by the Airport to increase its size and Gothatar lost its size on the map. Gothatar is located on the banks of the Holy Bagmati River the soil of this region is found fertile.

== Toponymy ==
=== Linguistic origin ===
- Linguistic family: Indoeuropean
- Language: Sanskrit

=== Etymology ===
“Goth” means cowshed, barn, or cattle shelter. “Tar” means hill, slope, or elevated ground. Therefore, Gothatar can be interpreted as “the hill with cowsheds” or “the elevated place where animals are kept.”

Goth (गोठ) means “cowshed, animal shelter” and comes from Sanskrit गोṣṭha (गोष्ठ) meaning cowshed, cattle enclosure. Tar (टार) means “hill, slope, elevated land” and comes from Sanskrit तट (taṭa) meaning slope, riverbank, elevated place. The toponym Gothatar is thus descriptive, meaning “hill with cowsheds” or “elevated place of cattle shelters,” reflecting the area’s traditional agricultural/pastoral use.
