= Kageshwari-Manohara =

Kageshwori-Manohara कागेश्वरी–मनोहरा
- Municipality (नगरपालिका)
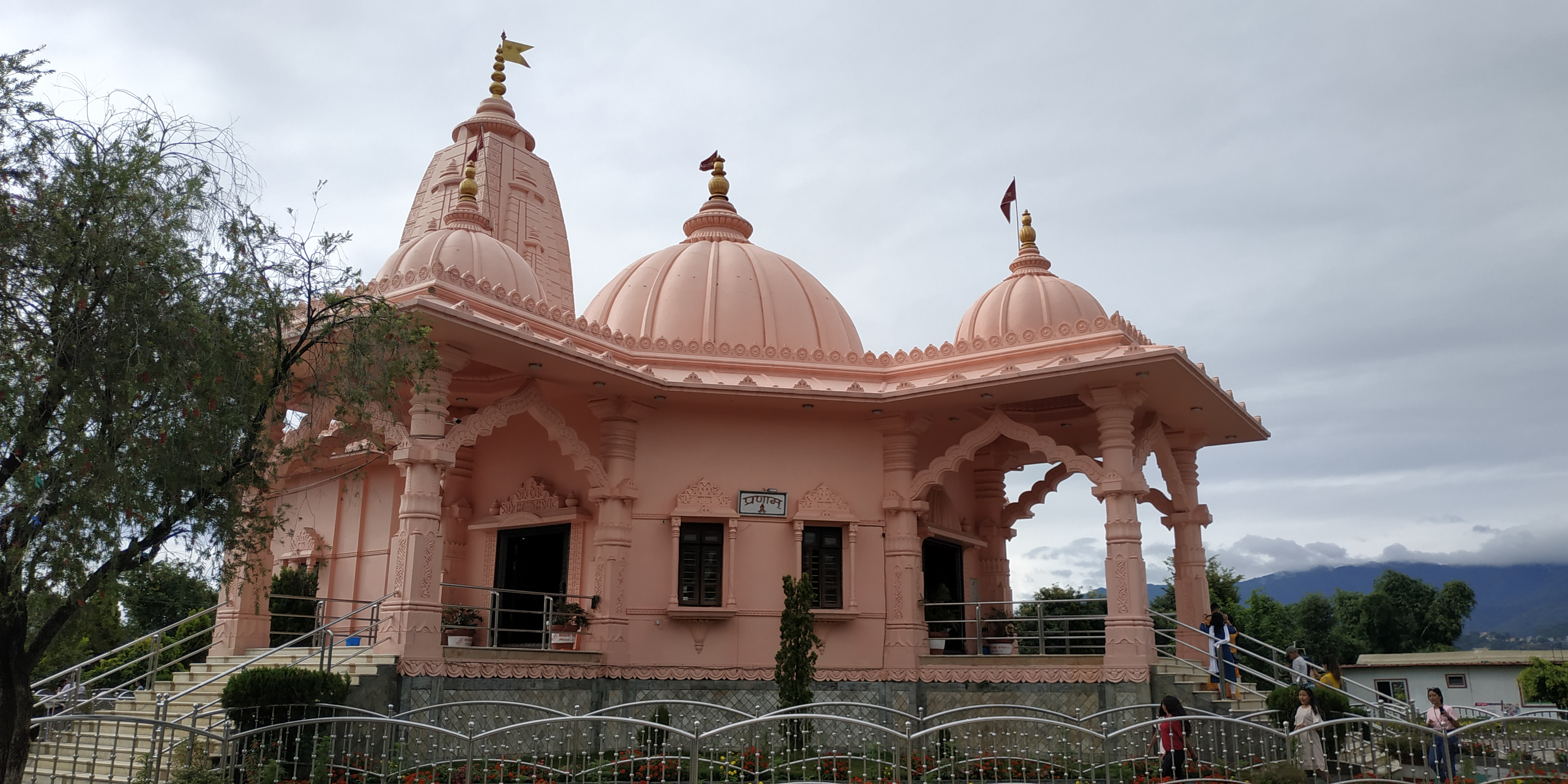
- Krishna Mandir at Jorpati, Kathmandu

- Location in Nepal Kageshwori-Manohara (Nepal)
- Coordinates: 27°43′33″N 85°24′42″E
- Country: Nepal
- Province: Bagmati
- District: Kathmandu
- Established: December 2014

Government
  - Type: Local Government
  - Mayor: Upendra Karki (NC)
  - Deputy mayor: Shanta Thapa (CPN-UML)

Area
  - Total: 27.5 km^{2} (10.6 sq mi)

Population (2021 Nepal census)
  - Total: 130,433
  - Density: 4,740/km^{2} (12,300/sq mi)
  - Ethnicities: Newar Tamang Sherpa Hyolmo Bahun Chhetri Magar
- Time zone: UTC+5:45 (NST)
- Website: https://kageshworimanoharamun.gov.np

Kageshwori-Manohara is a municipality in Kathmandu District in the Bagmati Province of Nepal that was established on 2 December 2014 by merging the former Village development committees of Aalapot, Bhadrabas, Danchhi, Gagalphedi, Gothatar and Mulpani. The office of the municipality is in Thali Danchhi in Ward No. 5.

== Administration ==
Upendra Karki of NC is Mayor and Shanta Thapa of CPN-UML is Deputy mayor of this municipality. They both were elected on 2022 Nepalese local elections.

== Population ==
Kageshwori-Manohara municipality had a total population of 60,237 according to 2011 Nepal census. The population grew to 130,433 at the 2021 Nepal census, with population density of 4,764 people per square kilometer. Around 99.7% of the residents are Nepali citizens and 88.4% are literate.
