= Guryong =

Guryong (hangul: 구룡 hanja: 九龍) can refer to the several places in South Korea:

- Guryong Station, Seoul Metro
- Guryong station (Suncheon)
- Guryong Falls in Odaesan National Park
- Guryong Village, last surviving shantytown in Gangnam, Seoul
