= Squatting in South Korea =

Occupation of land or buildings without the permission of the relevant authorities

South Korea on globe (dark green)

Squatting in South Korea is the occupation of land or buildings without the permission of the relevant authorities. From the 1950s onwards, shanty towns called P'anjach'on formed around cities, in particular the capital Seoul. As well as providing housing, squatting is used as a tactic by groups opposing gentrification and striking workers.

== History ==
At the end of the Korean War in 1953, refugees streamed into South Korea from North Korea and other countries, establishing informal settlements. In the 1960s and 1970s, South Korea industrialized and the capital Seoul grew from 2.5 million people in 1960 to 8 million in 1980. Many of these new inhabitants came from Jeolla Province and moved into P'anjach'on (shanty towns). Under the authoritarian leadership of Park Chung Hee the state attempted to eradicate the settlements. Since the squatters occupied infill sites, flooding could cause problems and in 1965 80,000 shacks were destroyed by the Cheonggye River. The state forcibly moved 15,000 squatters to a planned city which would later become Seongnam, but when richer inhabitants of Seoul started moving there as well, the squatters could not afford to live there and instead returned to Seoul. Squatters organised in their local area associations, for example in Mok-dong and Sanggye-dong. Between 1985 and 1988, 720,000 squatters were evicted.

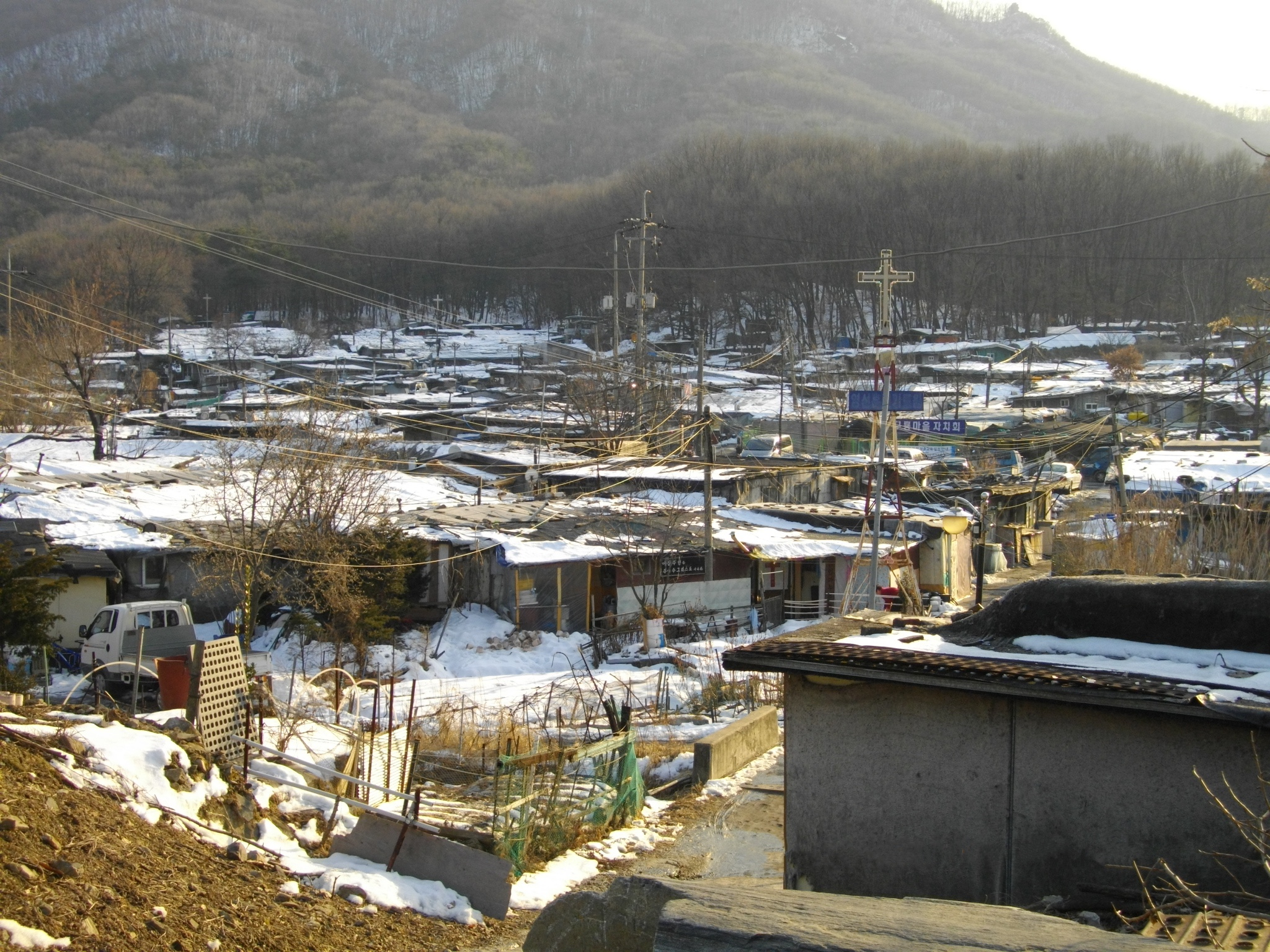
Guryong Village in 2013

Guryong Village (Nine Dragons village) in Gangnam District was squatted in 1988 after people were evicted from shanty towns as part of the preparations for the 1988 Summer Olympics. In 2012, 2,000 people lived there with little infrastructure. By 2020, the plans to redevelop the site had stalled and 1,000 people were still living there.

By 2000, there was no accurate data on the number of squatters in South Korea. Squatting has also become a tactic in protests against gentrification. In 2009, when police evicted a building squatted to stop redevelopment in central Seoul, at least four people were killed. The owners of the Duriban noodle bar situated near Hongik University were evicted on Christmas Eve 2009 and then squatted their premises until 8 June 2011, using it as a self-managed social centre until they reached an agreement with the owners. Another anti-gentrification squat was the Mari Cafe occupation in Myeong-dong. Also, the SsangYong Motor factory in Pyeongtaek was occupied for 77 days by over 1,000 workers in an industrial dispute.
