= List of cities in Korea =

List of cities in Korea may refer to:

- List of cities in North Korea
- List of cities in South Korea

== See also ==
- Administrative divisions of Korea (disambiguation)
