= Yeo Ok =

- Hangul: 여옥
- Hanja: 麗玉
- RR: Yeo Ok
- MR: Yŏ Ok

Yeo Ok is often regarded as Korea's first woman poet. Her poem, the Gonghuin (Korean: 공후인; Hanja: 箜篌引; lit. 'A Medley for the Harp'), is one of only three poems from the ancient Korean kingdom, Gojoseon (approximately 1500 B.C. - 108 B.C.) and the first by a woman. One version of the poem tells how one day at day break as Yeo Ok's husband, Gwakri Jago (藿里子高), was rowing across a river, he saw an old mad man jump into the river and try to swim across it. His wife had tried and failed to prevent him from entering the water. He was swept away and drowned. The old lady, stricken with grief, followed her husband into the water singing and playing her lyre and met the same sad fate as her husband.

Gwak Rijago told his wife Yeo Ok about the sad event and this moved her to set the old lady's words to music. Yeo Ok's poem was then written to be sung accompanied by a lyre (called a gong-in). The first record of this poem is in Hanja but authorities are uncertain as to whether it was originally written in Hanja characters or first composed in Korean and then later translated.

The "Gonghuin" was widely sung by Koreans at the time. Furthermore, it was introduced to the Chinese Jin dynasty and later China's most famous poet, Li Po, composed a poem with "Gonghuin" as the subject.

It has been claimed that the popularity of the poem is due to its portrayal of the dignity and love amongst the poor and the pain and loneliness of the woman who had lost love. All those involved are from the suffering, low or slave, classes whose lives then were so hard in society where only the privileged could live well.
