= Administrative divisions of Korea =

Administrative divisions of Korea may refer to:

- Provinces of Korea, of the Korean Empire and of Korea under Japanese rule
  - Eight Provinces of Korea (later thirteen), under the Joseon Dynasty
- Administrative divisions of North Korea
- Administrative divisions of South Korea

== See also ==
- Regions of Korea
