= Guryong station (Suncheon) =

Railway station in Suncheon, South Korea

Coordinates: 34°50′28.54″N 127°25′1.58″E

Guryong station 구룡역
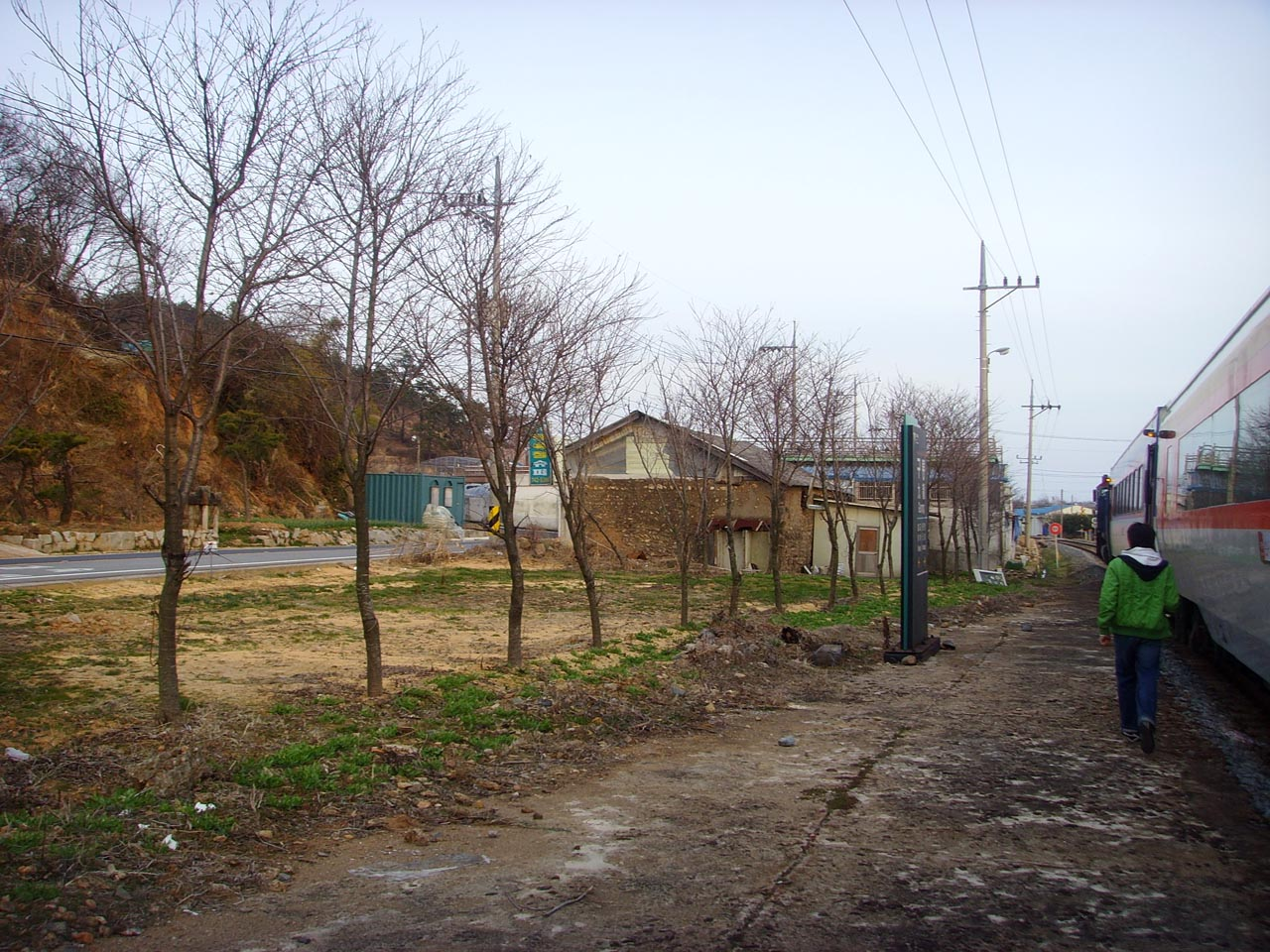

General information
- Location: Suncheon; South Korea
- Operator: Korail
- Line: Gyeongjeon Line
Location

Guryong station (구룡역) is a railway station in Suncheon, South Korea. It is on the Gyeongjeon Line.
