= Guryong Village =

Guryong Village 구룡마을
- Shanty town
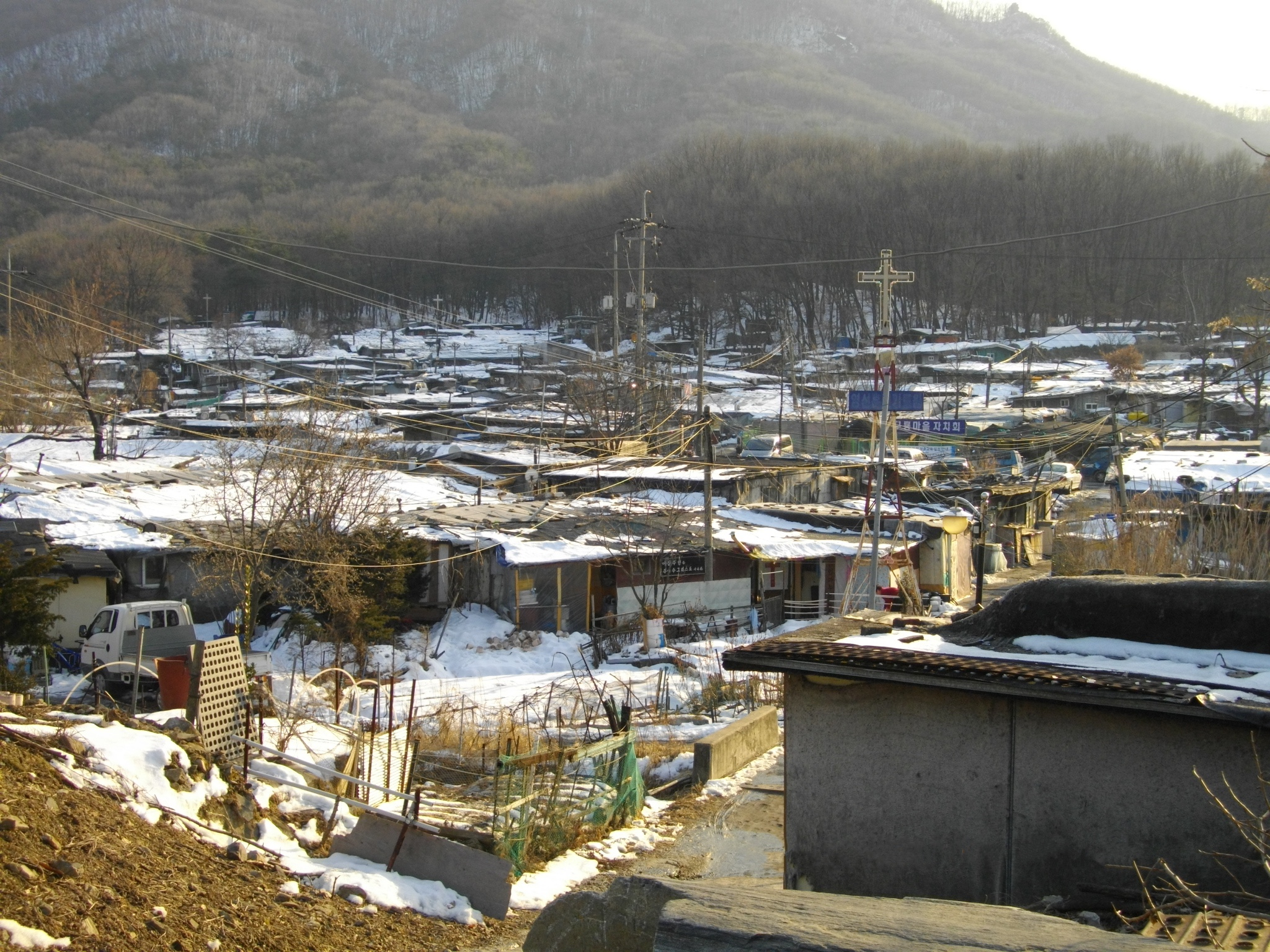
- Guryong in 2013

- Location within Seoul
- Coordinates: 37.4765°N 127.0643°E
- Country: South Korea
- Region: Gyeonggi
- City: Seoul
- Dong: Gaepo-dong
- Settled: 1985
- Founded: 1988
- Demolished: 2026

Area
  - Total: 28 ha (70 acres)

Guryong Village (Korean: 구룡마을 hanja: 九龍) is a neighborhood in Gangnam-gu, Seoul, South Korea. It is located across a six-lane motorway from affluent Dogok-dong.

Guryong and other shanty towns like it are known as daldongnae (Korean: 달동네 “moon villages”), a euphemism coined because they were often formed on hillsides and were therefore closer to the moon. Guryong is the slowest to redevelop among the remaining moon villages in Gangnam; Baeksa Village in the northeast of Nowon District began redevelopment in 2025 and Gaemi Village in Hongje-dong on the slope of Mt. Inwang was turned into a mural village.

The village first arose around the early 1980s, as residents were evicted from other parts of Seoul to make way for the city's rapid development ahead of the 1988 Olympic Games. It was an illegal settlement at the time, as the residents were squatting on privately owned land.

The village persisted over the decades, despite multiple efforts to resettle the residents. Beginning in the mid-2010s, the Seoul government was gradually moving residents out of the area, and offering them apartments in the area or elsewhere at significantly reduced rents. By 2019, it was reported that 406 of 1,107 households (36.7%) had been relocated.

Following the conditional approval of redevelopment plans, demolition of the village began in August 2026. Construction is anticipated to begin in 2027 and be completed in 2031.

== History ==
Guryong Village was one of the first “moon villages” (slums) in Seoul. It rose up around the early 1980s when city authorities evicted thousands of people, sometimes violently, from slums in central Seoul in order to redevelop the area in preparation for the 1988 Olympic Games. Guryong Mountain, from which the village takes its name, was designated as part of Seoul's greenbelt, and it gradually turned into a refuge for many of those evicted, who became squatters at the site.

The exact number of inhabitants remains uncertain, made difficult by an initial lack of official registration and fluctuations over time. When the village was first settled, there were around 8,000 people living in 2,000 households. In 2005, it was reported that the area had 4,000 inhabitants. In 2011, its inhabitants received temporary residence cards, and between 2012 and 2014 the population was given as 2,500 people. Following increased relocation efforts, a 2022 estimate placed the remaining population at around 600 people.

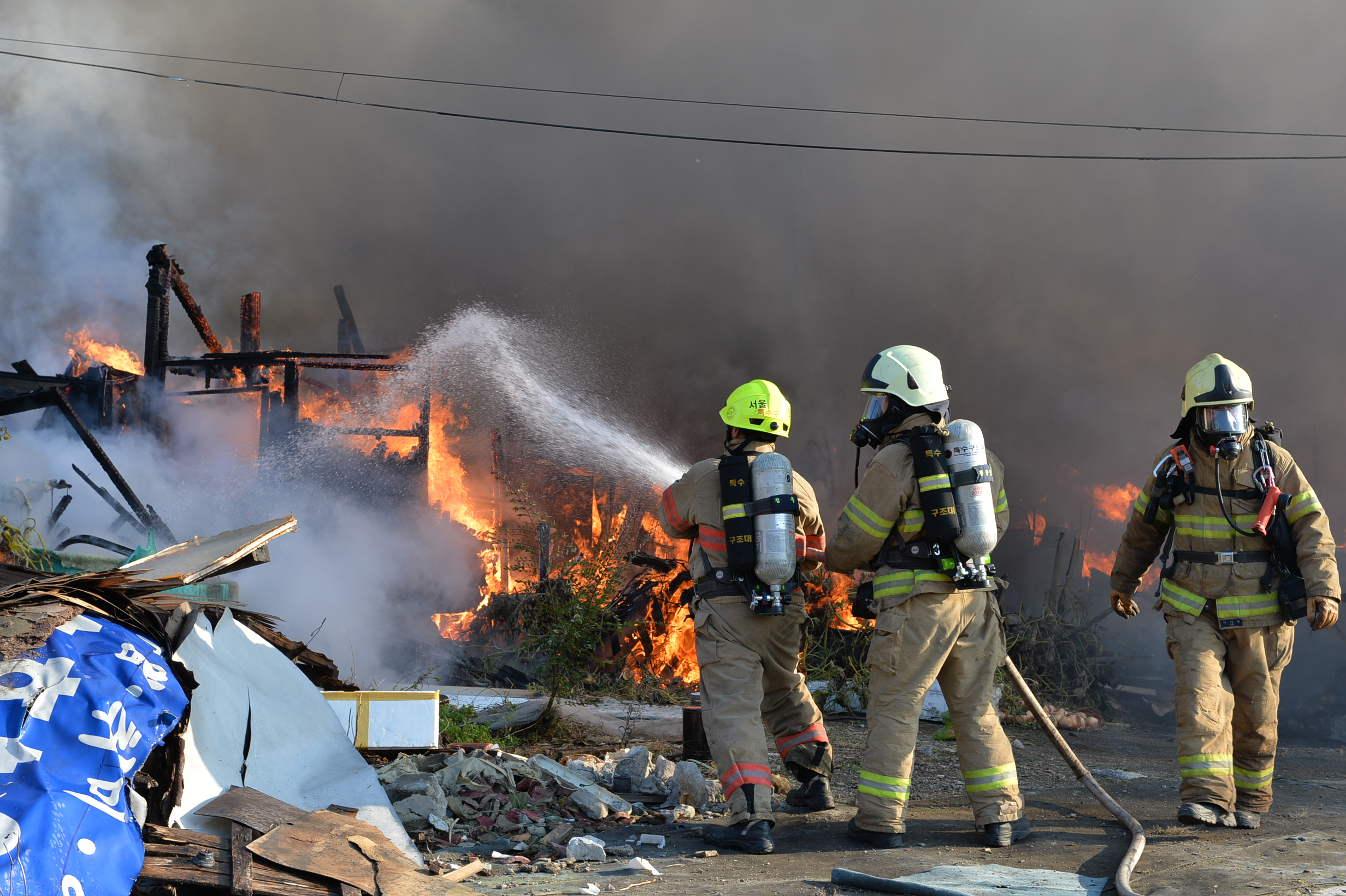
Firefighters battling a 2014 fire in the village

In 2014, it was reported that the area the village sat on was around 286,929 square meters (about 70 acres). There were estimated to be around 1,200 to 2,000 impromptu structures on the land, with the area of the individual houses estimated to be around 16 to 99 m^{2} (170 to 1,070 sq ft) each.

Due to the lack of enforced safety standards, the village was struck by multiple fires. Among them, a fire in January 2023 destroyed more than 60 homes and forced around 500 residents to evacuate. Another fire in January 2026 forced the evacuation of 258 residents.

Guryong acquired a number of amenities over the years, including a post office, a kindergarten and church, a security service, and even utilities like water, gas and electricity, for which payments were communal. Regardless, everyday life remained difficult; with residents struggling to sending their children to school while not having a permanent address, and very few of the households able to receive the welfare benefits for which they qualified. The infrastructure was also poor; the huts were built from scavenged materials, the streets and alleyways deteriorated rapidly in inclement weather, and many of the utility lines within the village were constructed by the residents themselves. The last remaining residents were primarily impoverished elderly people who earned very little for jobs such as scavenging recycling to sell or delivering takeout food.

=== Plans to demolish the village ===
In the past few decades, there were a number of efforts to demolish the village and relocate its residents, but progress was slow due to disagreements on how to proceed and how to deal with the village's residents. In 1991, a proposal to redevelop the land was interrupted by a real estate scandal in the Suseo-dong area.

In 2015, it was proposed that the government would demolish Guryong and arrange subsidized housing for its former residents. In 2016, the Seoul Metropolitan Government designated the area an official district and announced a series of efforts to relocate residents and redevelop the area. In 2019, it was reported that 406 out of 1,107 households (36.7%) had been relocated. In 2020, the Seoul Metropolitan Government announced that it had approved an action plan that was set to be completed by 2025. As part of the plan, the village would be gradually demolished and apartments would be built in its place, with a drastically reduced rent to be offered to villagers who choose to live in these apartments.

In July 2026, city authorities announced that redevelopment plans had been "conditionally approved" for a high-rise residential complex and a public housing complex on the site, laid out in such a way as to preserve the natural environment of Guryong Mountain and the nearby Daemo Mountain as much as possible. The city's goal is to begin construction in 2027 and complete it by 2031, pending final approval of the redevelopment plans in the second half of 2026. Demolition began in August 2026, with around ten residents still refusing to leave and demanding compensation for the loss of their homes. Later that month the Seoul Housing & Urban Development Corporation filed a criminal complaint against three of those residents, all elderly men, for illegally occupying the land and obstructing redevelopment.

In October 2026, a house fire in Guryong affected 77 households and 107 people; the fire department deployed 232 personnel and 70 vehicles. The fire was reported to have started at a garbage collection site. Firefighting helicopters were used to prevent the fire from reaching a nearby forest.

== Gallery ==
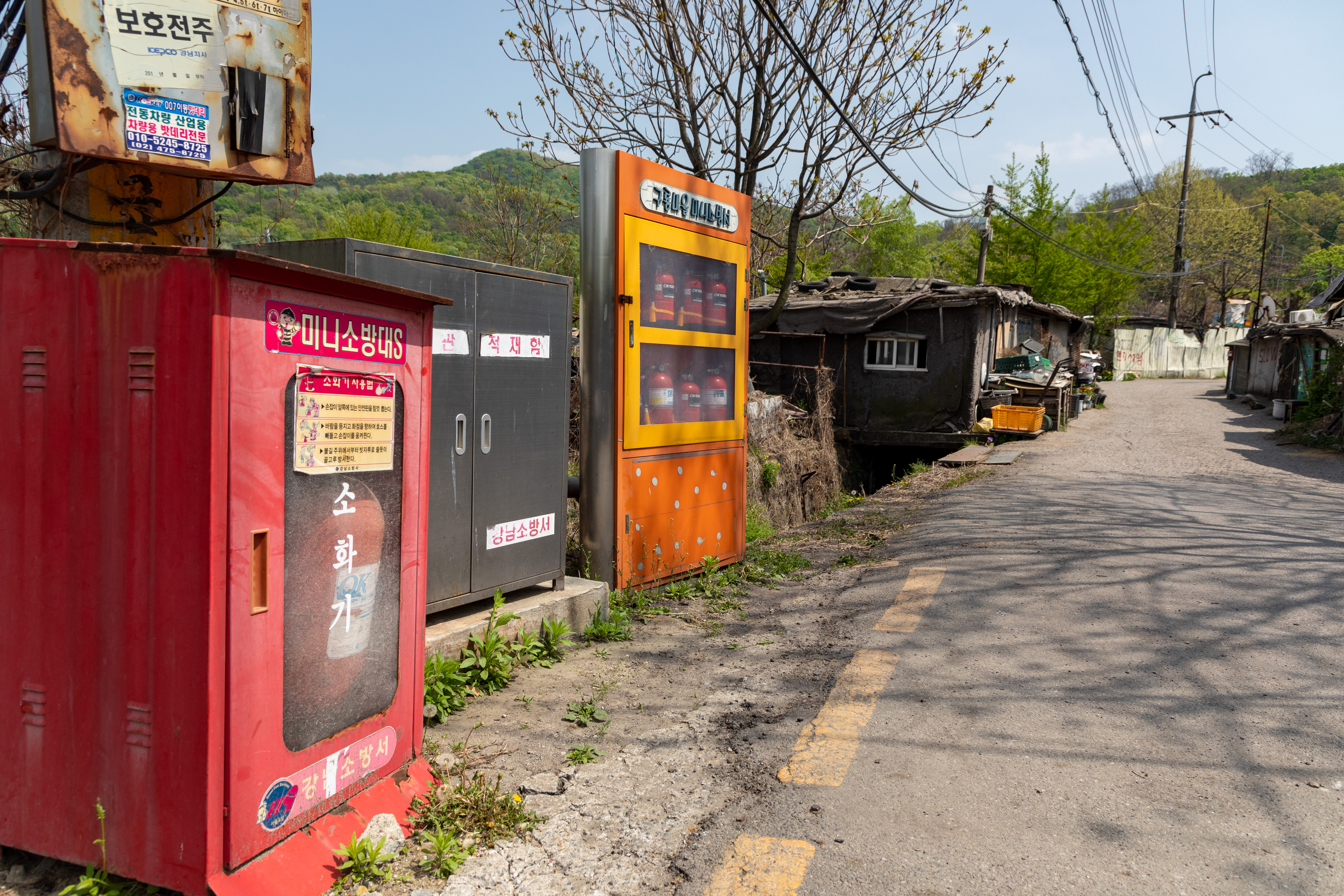
Fire extinguishing equipment at the village entrance

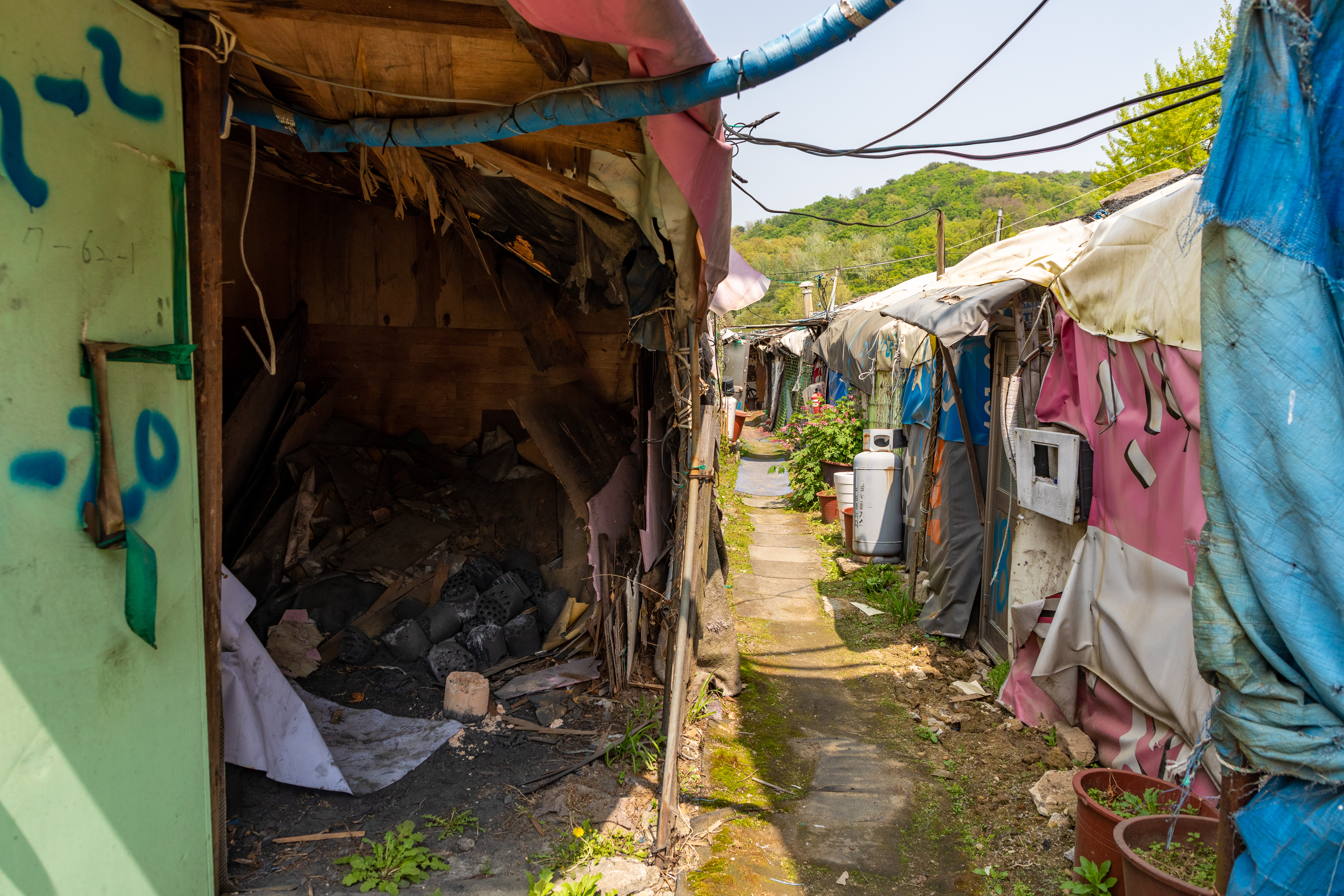
Charcoal briquet storage and an alley

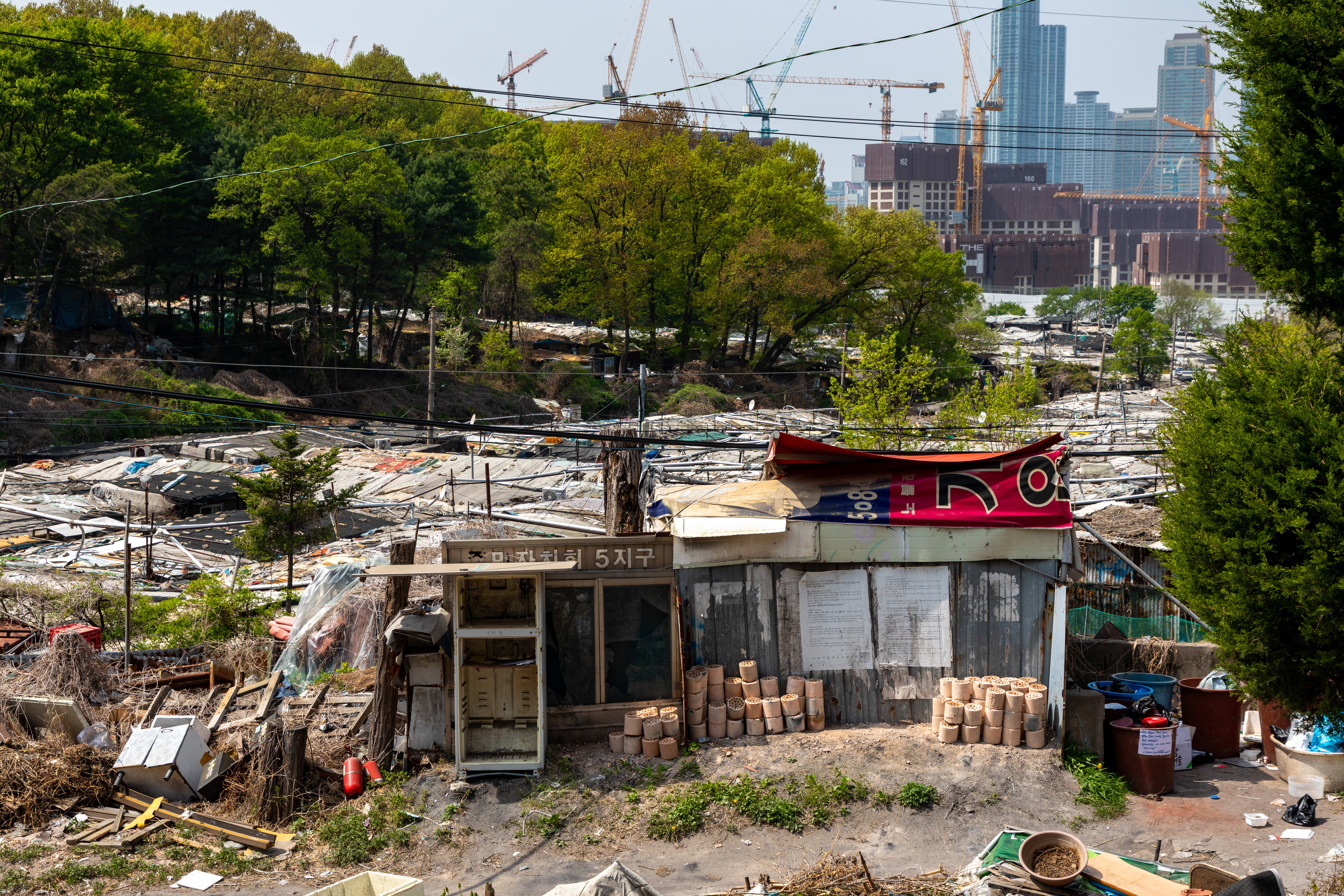
Overview over the village rooftops

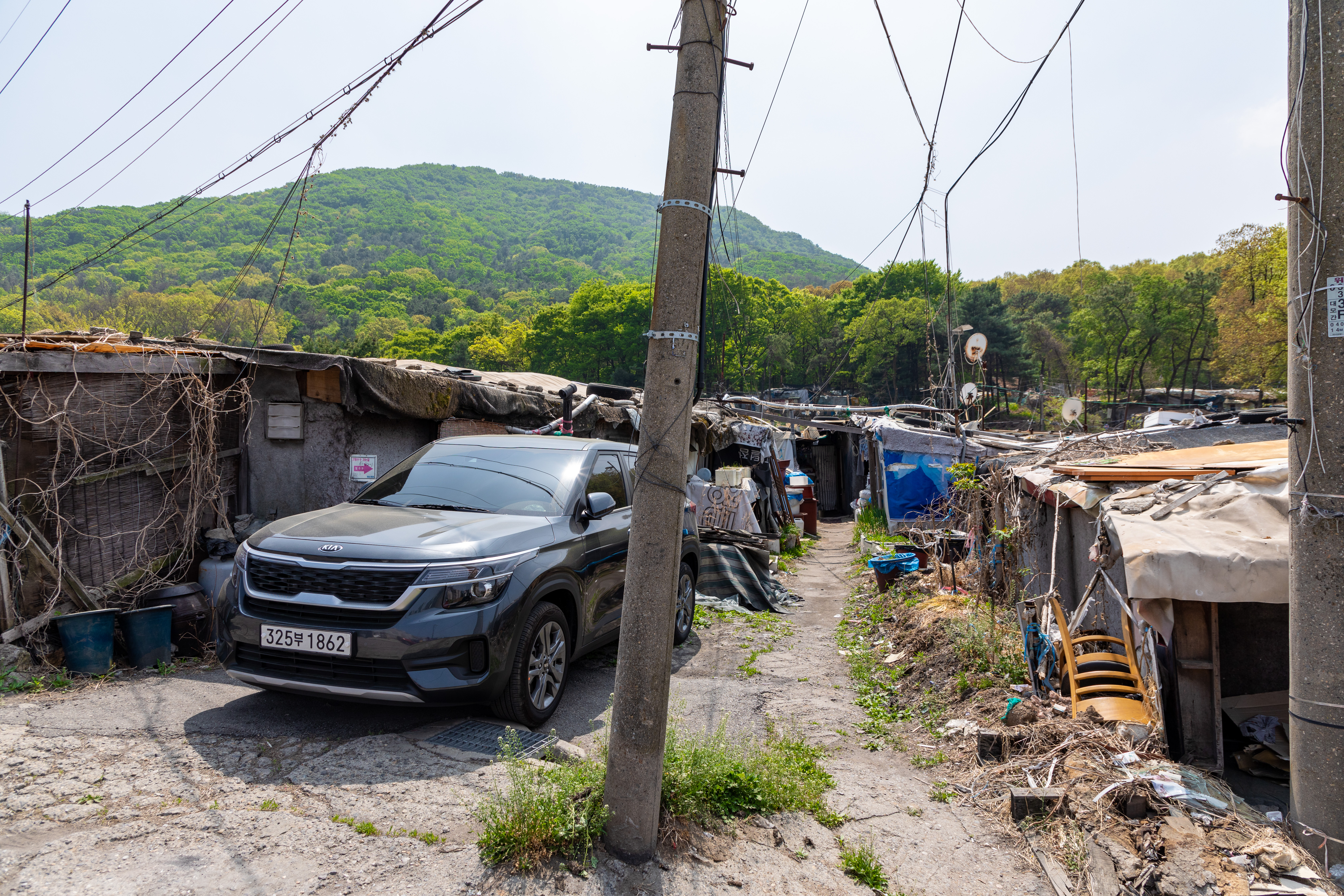
Shiny Kia parked in front of the apartments

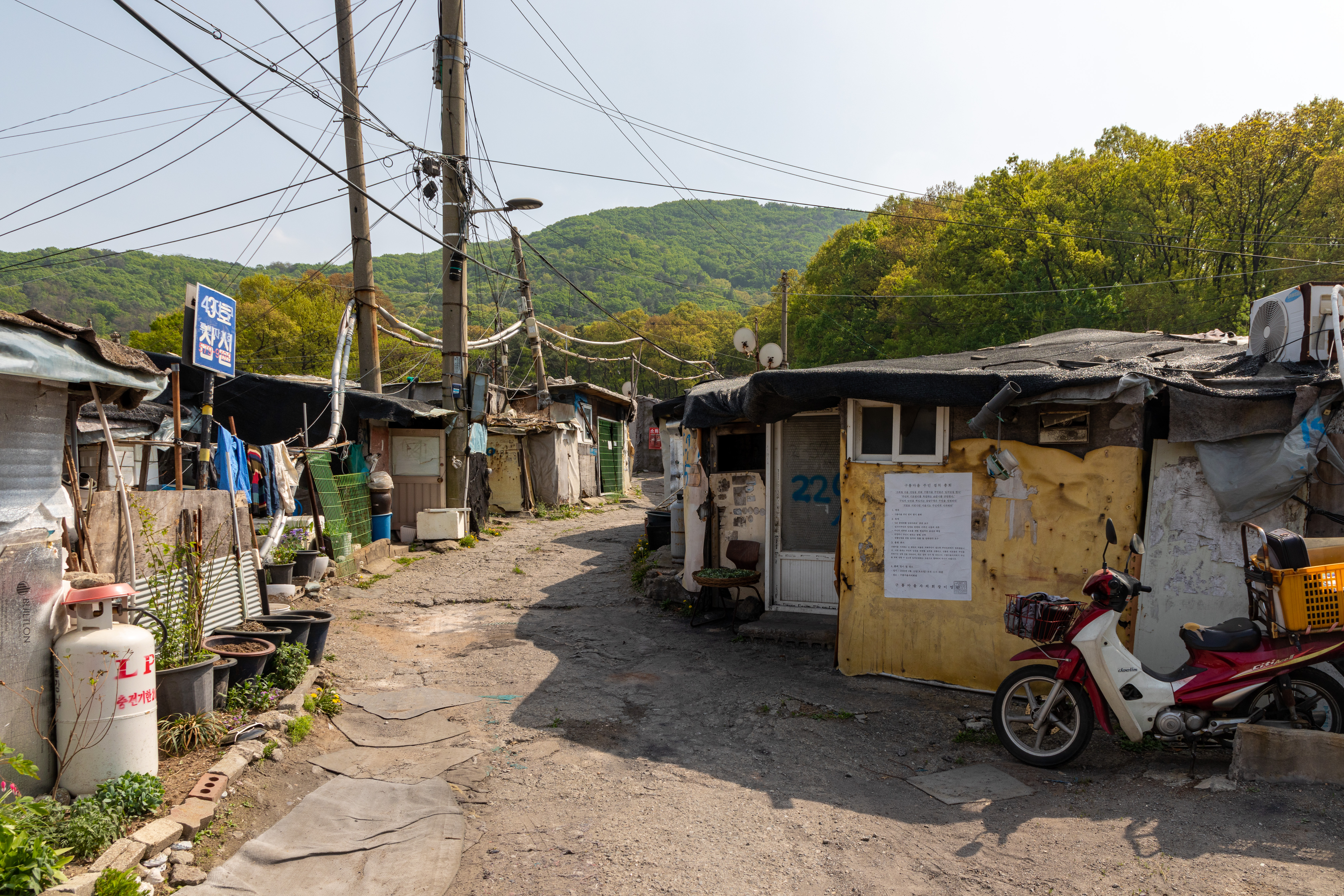
Another regular alley in the village

== See also ==
- Poverty in South Korea
- Ihwa Mural Village
