= Economy of Nepal =

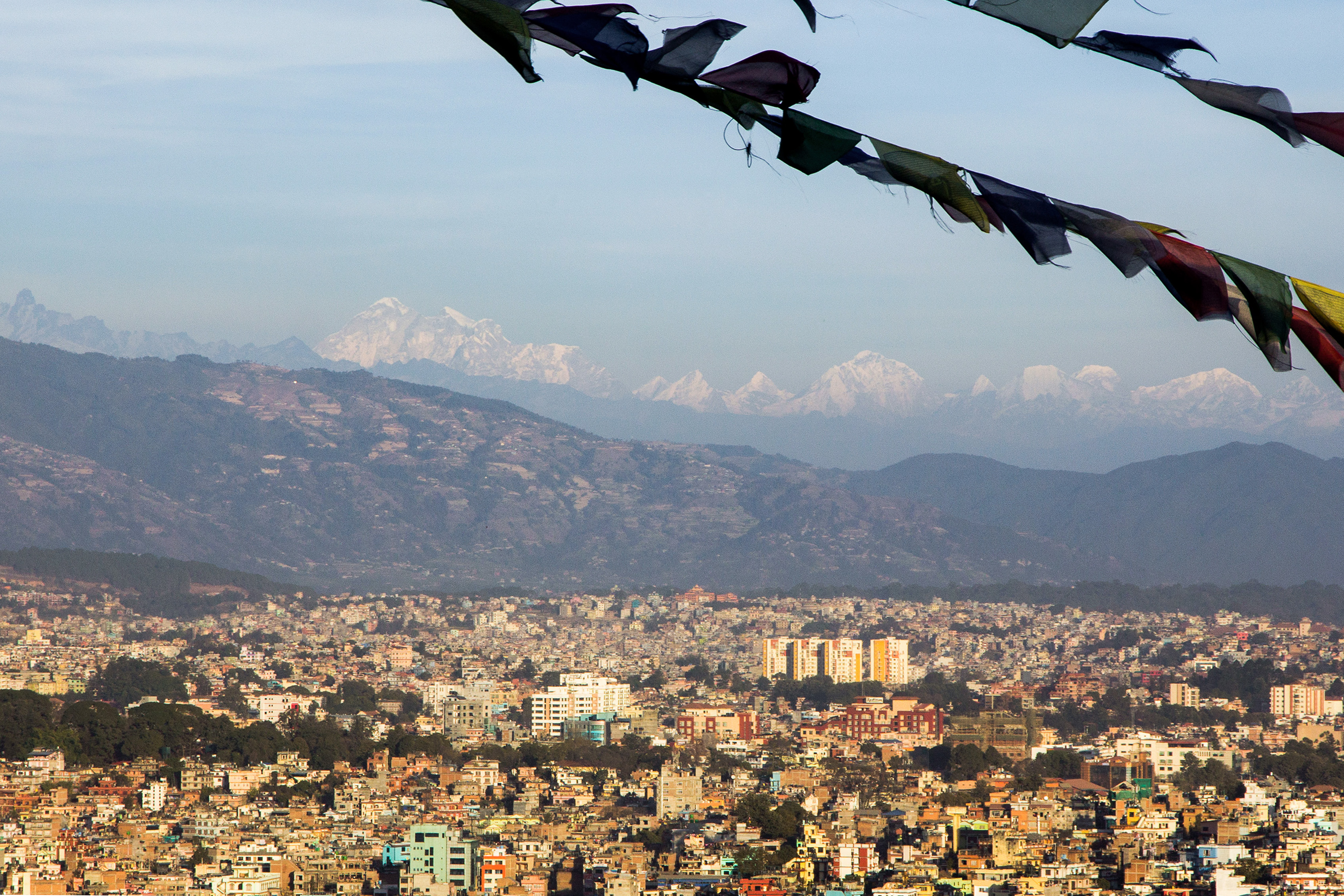
- Kathmandu, capital city and the financial centre of Nepal
- Currency: Nepalese rupee (NPR, रू)
- Fiscal year: 16 July - 15 July
- Trade organizations: WTO, SAFTA and BIMSTEC
- Country group: Least developed; Lower-middle income economy

Statistics
- Population: ▲29,629,410 (50th; 2025 est.)
- GDP: ▲$49.112 billion (nominal, 2026f); ▲$194.852 billion (PPP, 2026f)
- GDP rank: 99th (nominal; 2026); 84th (PPP; 2026)
- GDP growth: 4.3% (2026f)
- GDP per capita: ▲$1,658 (nominal, 2026); ▲$6,578 (PPP, 2026)
- GDP per capita growth: 3.8% (2024)
- GDP by sector: Agriculture: 21.9%; Industry: 11.4%; Services: 55.2%; (2024 est.)
- Inflation (CPI): 4.7% (2024)
- Population below national poverty line: 20.3% (2022); 2.4% on less than $3/day (2022)
- Gini coefficient: 32.8 medium (2010)
- Human Development Index: ▲0.622; medium (2023) (145nd): ▲0.437 low IHDI (2021)
- Labour force: ▼16,016,973 (2020); semi skilled labor; 76.2% employment rate (2020)
- Labour force by occupation: agriculture: 43.1%; industry: 21.24%; services: 35.66%; (2020)
- Unemployment: 12.6% (2022)
- Youth unemployment: 20.6% (2025)
- Main industries: tourism, carpets, textiles; small rice, jute, sugar, and oilseed mills; cigarettes, cement and brick production

External
- Exports: ▲$3.74 billion (2024–25)
- Export goods: clothing, pulses, carpets, textiles, juice, jute goods
- Main export partners: India(-) 67% (2024–25); USA(+) 12% (2024–25); Others(-) 21% (2024–25)
- Imports: ▲$17.78 billion (2024–25)
- Import goods: petroleum products, machinery and equipment, gold, electrical goods, medicine
- Main import partners: India(+) 71%(2024-25); China(+) 17%(2024-25); Others(-) 12% (2024–25)
- FDI stock: $20 billion (2013); Abroad: NA
- Gross external debt: ▼$11 billion (2020)

Public finance
- Government debt: ▲41.38% of GDP (2021/22)
- Foreign reserves: ▲$23.55 billion (mid-april 2026)
- Budget balance: −1% (of GDP) (2022 est.)
- Revenue: 10.925 billion (2017 est.)
- Spending: 15.945 billion (2017)
- All values, unless otherwise stated, are in US dollars.

Nepal has a developing mixed economy largely driven by agriculture, services, industry, and tourism. Agriculture remains the main source of livelihood for most of the population, while the service sector including trade, transport, and communications has become increasingly important. In recent years, hydropower, manufacturing, and information technology have shown growing potential, supported by government efforts to attract investment and improve infrastructure. The country continues to pursue policies aimed at sustainable growth and regional economic integration.

== History ==
With the introduction of a planned development strategy known as the Five-Year Plans of Nepal in 1956, Nepal pursued an inward-looking state-led development strategy with the state actively intervening in and taking over strategic activities that would generate employment and improve living standards. The state established numerous public sector enterprises in almost all sectors ranging from manufacturing to food marketing, controlled trade and industry with license and quota system, protected domestic industries behind high tariffs, adopted stringent foreign exchange control, subsidized agriculture inputs, controlled prices and distribution system, and directed lending of commercial banks. Contrary to expectations, output growth remained very low at about 3 percent per annum against an annual population growth of 2.7 percent during mid-1970s to mid-1980s, exports stagnated at about 5 percent of GDP in 1985/86, imports surged from about 11 percent of GDP in 1975 to 17 percent in 1985 and the country experienced a severe macroeconomic and foreign exchange crisis.

To address the external crisis, and to reverse deteriorating macroeconomic performance, the government launched a broad range of reforms through the adoption of economic stabilization and structural adjustment programs of the International Monetary Fund (IMF) and the World Bank, respectively, in the mid-1980s. Accordingly, the rupee was devalued, import regimes were liberalized, the system of industrial licensing was eased and export procedures were simplified.

== Sectors ==
=== Agriculture, animal husbandry and forestry ===
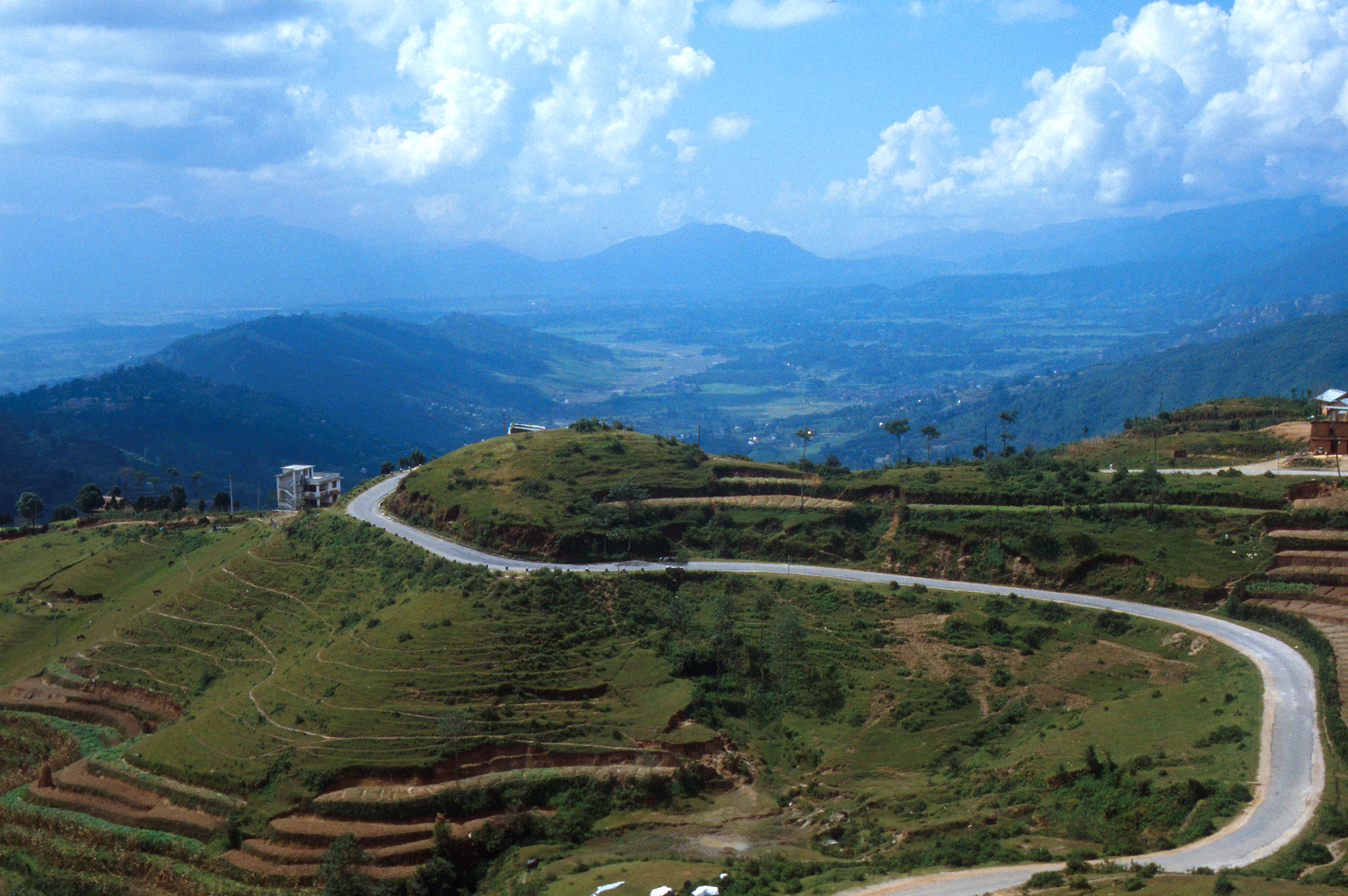
Terraced farming on the foothills of the Himalayas is a common sight in many villages in Nepal.

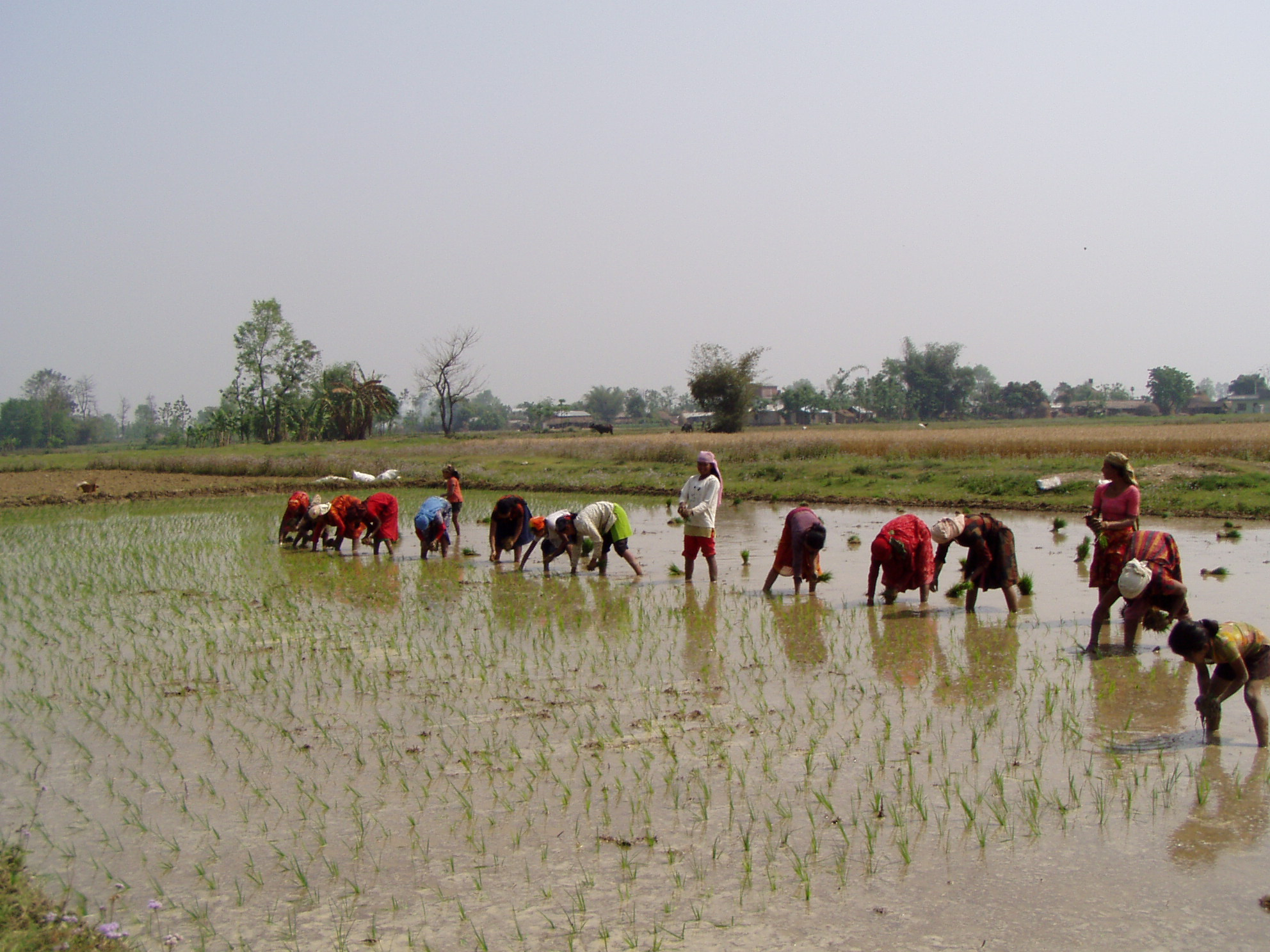
Nepalese women planting rice

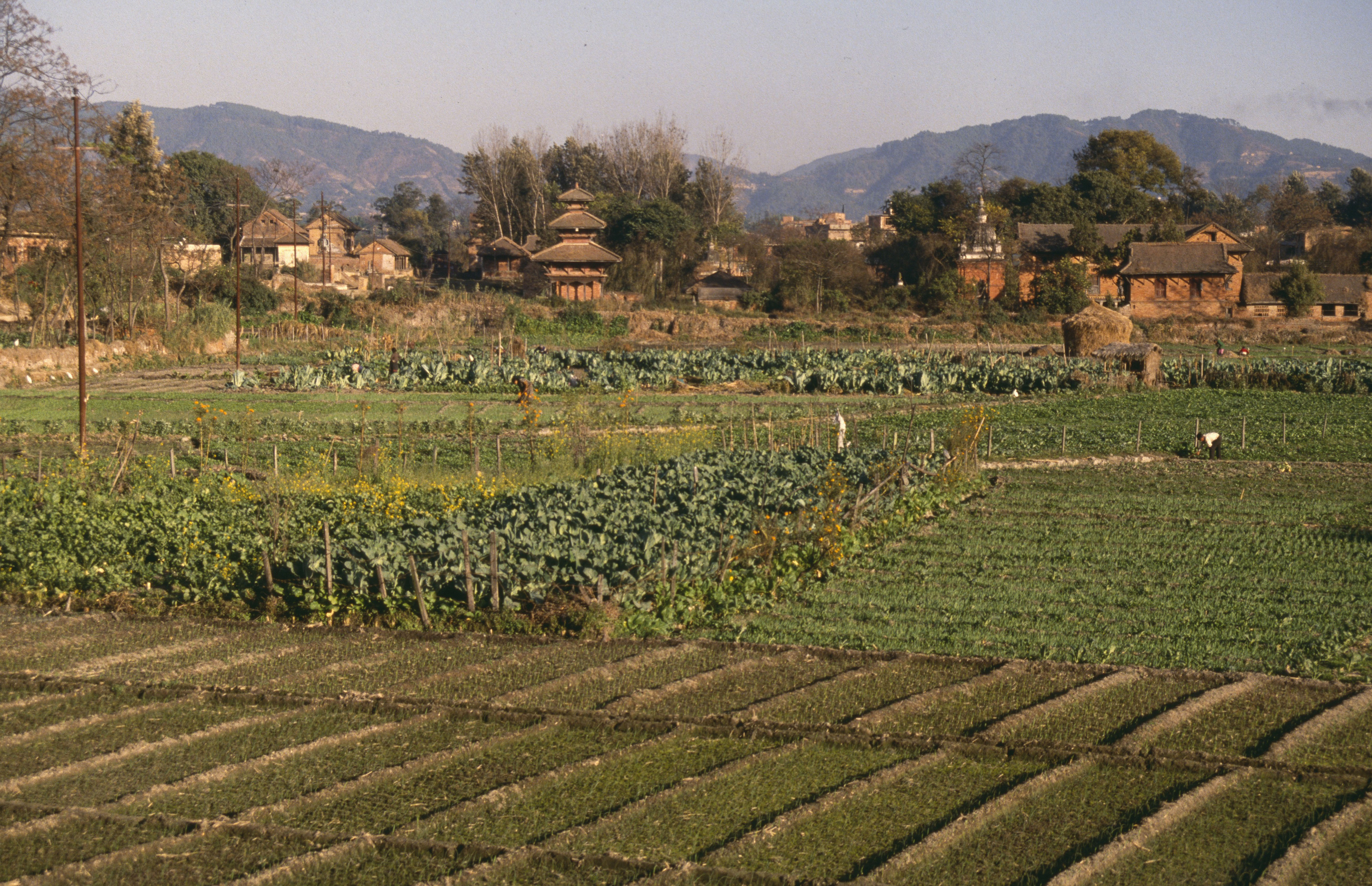
Cultivation in the Kathmandu Valley

In Nepal, the economy is dominated by agriculture. In the late 1980s, it was the livelihood for more than 90% of the population. Although only approximately 20% of the total land area was cultivable.

The agricultural sector has remained the backbone of the national economy. Agriculture contributes 21.6 percent to the Gross Domestic Product (GDP) and provides the main occupation for approximately 62.0 percent of households. About 67.0 percent of the total population resides within agricultural families. (Source: Economic Survey 2080/81).

Since the formulation of the Fifth Five-Year Plan (1975–80), agriculture has been the highest priority because of the dependence of economic growth on both increasing the productivity of existing crops and diversifying the agricultural base for use as industrial inputs.

According to the World Bank, agriculture is the main source of food, income, and employment for the majority of the population in Nepal. It provides about 21.6 % of the gross domestic product (GDP).

In trying to increase agricultural production and diversify the agricultural base, the government focused on irrigation, the use of fertilizers and insecticides, the introduction of new implements and new seeds of high-yield varieties, and the provision of credit. The lack of distribution of these inputs, as well as problems in obtaining supplies, however, inhibited progress. Although land reclamation and settlement were occurring in the Terai Region, environmental degradation and ecological imbalance resulting from deforestation also prevented progress.

Although new agricultural technologies helped increase food production, there still was room for further growth. Past experience indicated bottlenecks, however, in using modern technology to achieve a healthy growth. The conflicting goals of producing cash crops both for food and for industrial inputs also were problematic.

=== Mining ===
Nepal has been mining on a small scale for iron, copper, lead, zinc, cobalt, nickel and gold. Old mine pits, adits, smelting places and other remnants of mine processing are found all over Nepal. Some villages are named after mineral names, such as Taba Khani, Falam Khani, Shisa Khani or Sun Khani.

Before 1951 (2007 BS) Nepal was an exporter of iron and copper to Tibet and cobalt to India. At Thoshe iron deposit (Ramechhap), a gun manufacturing plant was established in 1921, but this is non-functional now. After the change of government in 1951, mining activities gradually closed.

Systematic geological mapping and mineral exploration were carried out by the Nepal Bureau of Mines, established in 1961, and by the Nepal Geological Survey, established in 1967. These two organizations were combined in 1977 and renamed as the Department of Mines and Geology (DMG). Mineral exploration activities were at their peak during 1969–1984. Some potential mineral resources identified by the explorations are listed below.

=== Energy ===
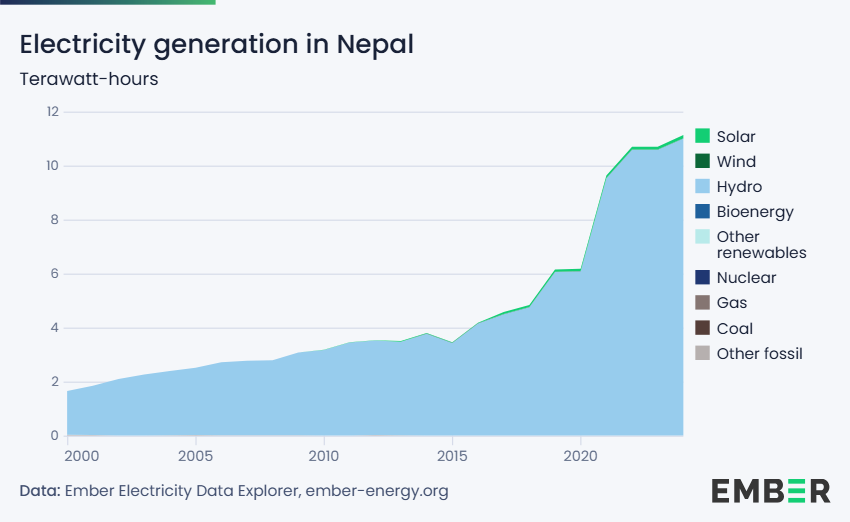
Electricity generation in Nepal in terawatt-hours

Nepal is a country enclosed by land, situated between China and India. It has a total area of 148,006.67 square kilometers and a population of 29.16 million. It has a small economy, with a GDP of $42 billion in 2024, amounting to about 1% of South Asia and 0.04% of the World's GDP.

Nepal's total energy consumption in 2019/2020 was 14.464 million tons of oil equivalent, increased from 10.29 Mtoe in 2012. Electricity consumption was 3.57 TWh. The energy mix is dominated by traditional sources like firewood and agricultural residue (68.7%), most of this primary energy (about 80%) represents solid biofuels used in the residential sector (for heating, cooking etc.). Smaller shares of energy come from commercial sources like petroleum and coal (28.2%) and renewable sources. About 23% of the electricity is imported, with the rest almost completely supplied by hydroelectricity. Nepal also exports hydroelectricity to India in the wet season.

Nepal has no known major oil, gas, or coal reserves, and its position in the Himalayas makes it hard to reach remote communities. Consequently, in the absence of the energy grid reaching remote locations, most Nepali citizens have historically met their energy needs with biomass, human labor, imported kerosene, and/or traditional vertical axis water mills. Energy consumption per capita is thus low, at one-third the average for Asia as a whole and less than one-fifth of the world average.

The country has considerable hydroelectricity potential. The commercially viable potential is estimated at 44 GW from 66 hydropower sites.

In 2010, the electrification rate was only 53% (leaving 12.5 million people without electricity) and 76% depended on wood for cooking. With about 1 toe for every $1,000 of GDP, Nepal has the poorest energy intensity among all south Asian countries. The country has therefore very large energy efficiency potential.

=== Education ===
Education in Nepal has been modeled on the Indian system, which is in turn based on that of the old British Raj. The National Examinations Board supervises all standardized tests, while the Ministry of Education and Sports is responsible for managing educational activities in Nepal. The National Center for Educational Development is Nepal's teacher-training body.

In 2021, Nepal's literacy rate was 76.3% (83.6% for males and 69.4% for females). The April 2015 Nepal earthquake destroyed schools and severely impacted the nation's ability to keep its remaining schools open.

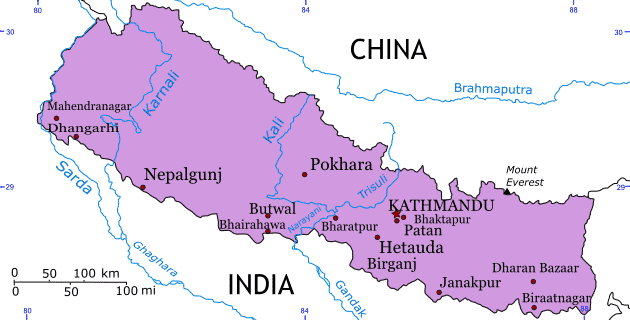
Nepal's location relative to its neighbors, China and India

=== Healthcare ===
Health care services in Nepal are provided by both public and private sectors and are generally regarded as failing to meet international standards. Prevalence of disease is significantly higher in Nepal than in other South Asian countries, especially in rural areas. Moreover, the country's topographical and sociological diversity results in periodic epidemics of infectious diseases, epizootics and natural hazards such as floods, forest fires, landslides, and earthquakes. But, recent surge in non-communicable diseases has emerged as the main public health concern and this accounts for more than two-thirds of total mortality in country. A large section of the population, particularly those living in rural poverty, are at risk of infection and mortality by communicable diseases, malnutrition and other health-related events. Nevertheless, some improvements in health care can be witnessed; most notably, there has been significant improvement in the field of maternal health. These improvements include:

- Human Development Index (HDI) value increased to 0.602 in 2019 from 0.291 in 1975.
- Mortality rate during childbirth deceased from 850 out of 100,000 mothers in 1990 to 186 out of 100,000 mothers in 2017.
- Mortality under the age of five decreased from 61.5 per 1,000 live births in 2005 to 32.2 per 1,000 live births in 2018.
- Infant mortality decreased from 97.70 in 1990 to 26.7 in 2017.
- Neonatal mortality decreased from 40.4 deaths per 1,000 live births in 2000 to 19.9 deaths per 1,000 live births in 2018.
- Child malnutrition: Stunting 37%, wasting 11%, and underweight 30% among children under the age of five.
- Life expectancy rose from 66 years in 2005 to 72 years in 2025.

The Human Rights Measurement Initiative finds that Nepal is fulfilling 85.7% of what it should be fulfilling for the right to health based on its level of income. When looking at the right to health with respect to children, Nepal achieves 97.1% of what is expected based on its current income. In regards to the right to health amongst the adult population, the country achieves 94.6% of what is expected based on the nation's level of income. Nepal falls into the "very bad" category when evaluating the right to reproductive health because the nation is fulfilling only 65.5% of what the nation is expected to achieve based on the resources (income) it has available.

=== Retail ===
Retail in Nepal is dominated by traditional mom-and-pop "Kirana" stores, which account for nearly 90% of the market. An Association for Craft Producers was organized in Nepal in 1984 to promote fair trade, especially among women creating artisan products. Urban areas are witnessing a rise in modern retail, including shopping malls, departmental stores and e-commerce platforms.

=== Telecommunications ===
Nepal's telecommunication network has increased over the years significantly, with the number of telephone users (both fixed and mobile phone) reaching 40,789,198 as of 14 May 2019.

Nepal Telecommunications Authority (NTA) is the regulatory body of telecommunications in the country. According to the latest figures, eight companies have been licensed to operate voice-based telephony services, out of which five are heavily invested by foreign companies. The investment market of telecom is a subject of interest for many foreign companies and NTA itself as it has to prepare the regulations on hand.

According to the latest Management Information system (MIS) report of the Nepal Telecommunications Authority (NTA), 97.65 per cent of 26.49 million people in the country have access to telephone service. The report includes data of up to mid-December 2014. Telephone penetration increased by 12.88 percentage points in one year. It stood at 84.77 per cent in mid-December 2013.

=== Transport ===
Transportation in Nepal has developed under significant geographical constraints due to the country's mountainous terrain and landlocked position. Modern transport systems began in the early 20th century, with roads becoming the primary mode of transportation, complemented by limited rail connections, air transport, ropeways, and inland dry ports.

=== Tourism ===
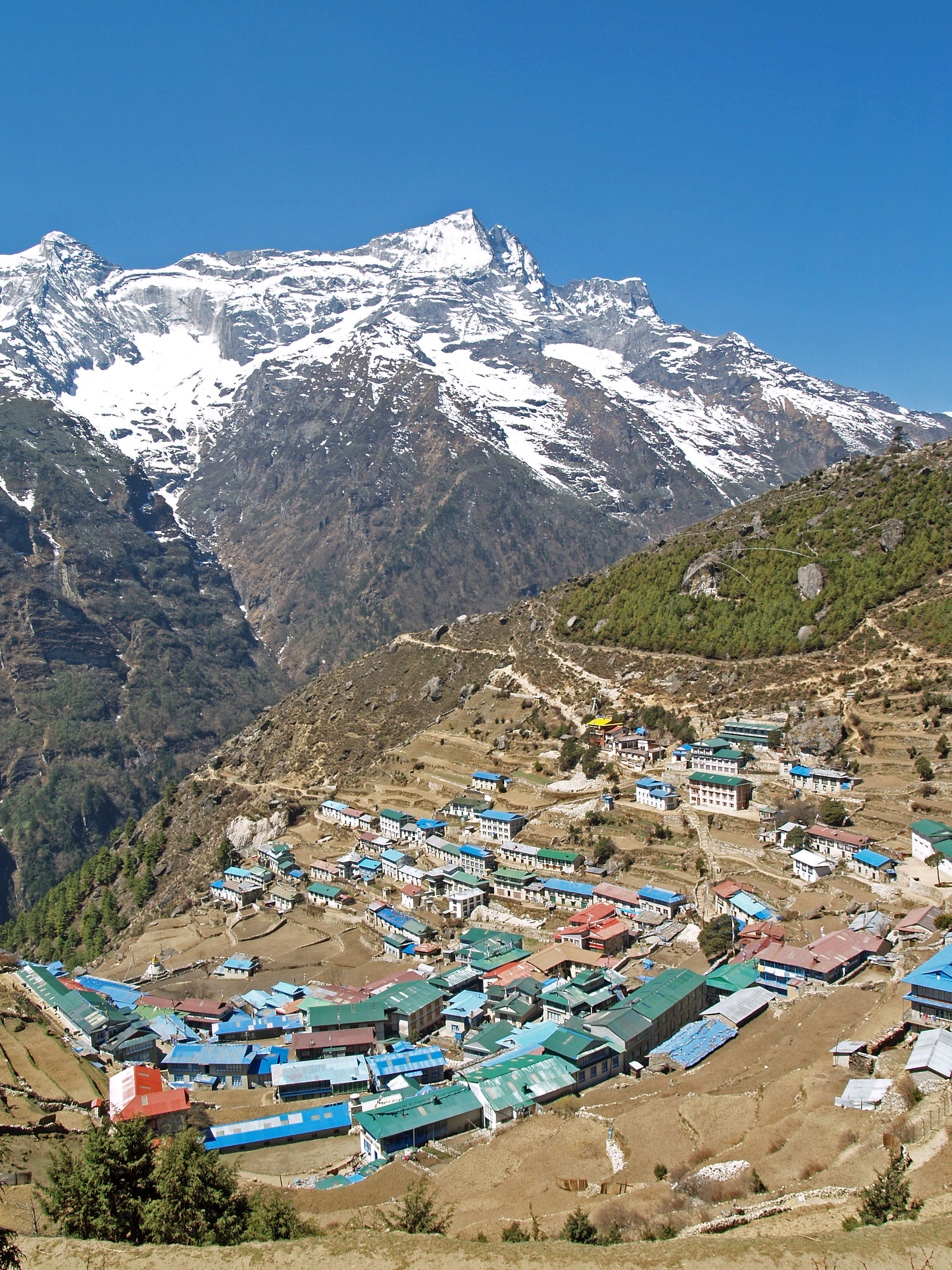
Namche Bazaar, gateway to Mount Everest, under snow

Tourism is the largest source of foreign exchange revenue for Nepal. Tourism in Nepal contributes about 6.7% of the country's gross domestic product (GDP). In 2025, Nepal welcomed 11,58,4589 tourists, placing it 147th globally in terms of tourist numbers. Home to eight of the ten highest mountains in the world, Nepal is a destination for mountaineers, rock climbers and adventure seekers. The Hindu and Buddhist heritages of Nepal are also strong attractions.

== Foreign investments and taxation ==
Huge numbers of Small Foreign Investments come to Nepal via the Non Resident Nepali, who are investing in many sectors. Nepal has a huge potential for hydroelectricity. Accordingly, a large number of foreign companies are willing to invest in Nepal, but political instability has stopped the process. Nepal has entered into agreements for avoidance of double taxation (all in credit method) with 10 countries (PSRD) since 2000. Similarly, it has Investment protection agreements with 5 countries (PSRD) since 1983. In 2014, Nepal restricted the Foreign aid by setting a minimum limit for foreign grants, soft and commercial loans from its development partners.

== Imports and exports ==
Exports of Nepal by product category (2019) Chemical products Transportation Machines Mineral products Plastics and rubbers Metals Foodstuffs Precious metals Textiles Instruments Animal products Vegetable products Paper goods Footwear and headwear Miscellaneous Stone and glass Wood products Animal and vegetable bi-products Animal hides Arts and antiques Weapons

Nepal's merchandise trade balance has improved somewhat since 2000 with the growth of the carpet and garment industries. In the fiscal year 2000–2001, exports posted a greater increase (14%) than imports (4.5%), helping bring the trade deficit down by 4% from the previous year to $749 million. Recently, the European Union has become the largest buyer of ready-made garments; fruits and vegetables (mostly apples, pears, tomatoes, various salads, peach, nectarine, potatoes, rice) from Nepal. Exports to the EU accounted for 46.13 percent of the country's garment exports.

The annual monsoon rain strongly influences economic growth. From 1996 to 1999, real GDP growth averaged less than 4%. The growth rate recovered in 1999, rising to 6% before slipping slightly in 2001 to 5.5%.

Strong export performance, including earnings from tourism, and external aid have helped improve the overall balance of payments and increase international reserves. Nepal receives substantial amounts of external assistance from the United Kingdom, the United States, Japan, Germany, and the Nordic countries.

Several multilateral organisations such as the World Bank, the Asian Development Bank, and the UN Development Programme also provide assistance. In June 1998, Nepal submitted its memorandum on a foreign trade regime to the World Trade Organization and in May 2000 began direct negotiations on its accession.

== Labour ==
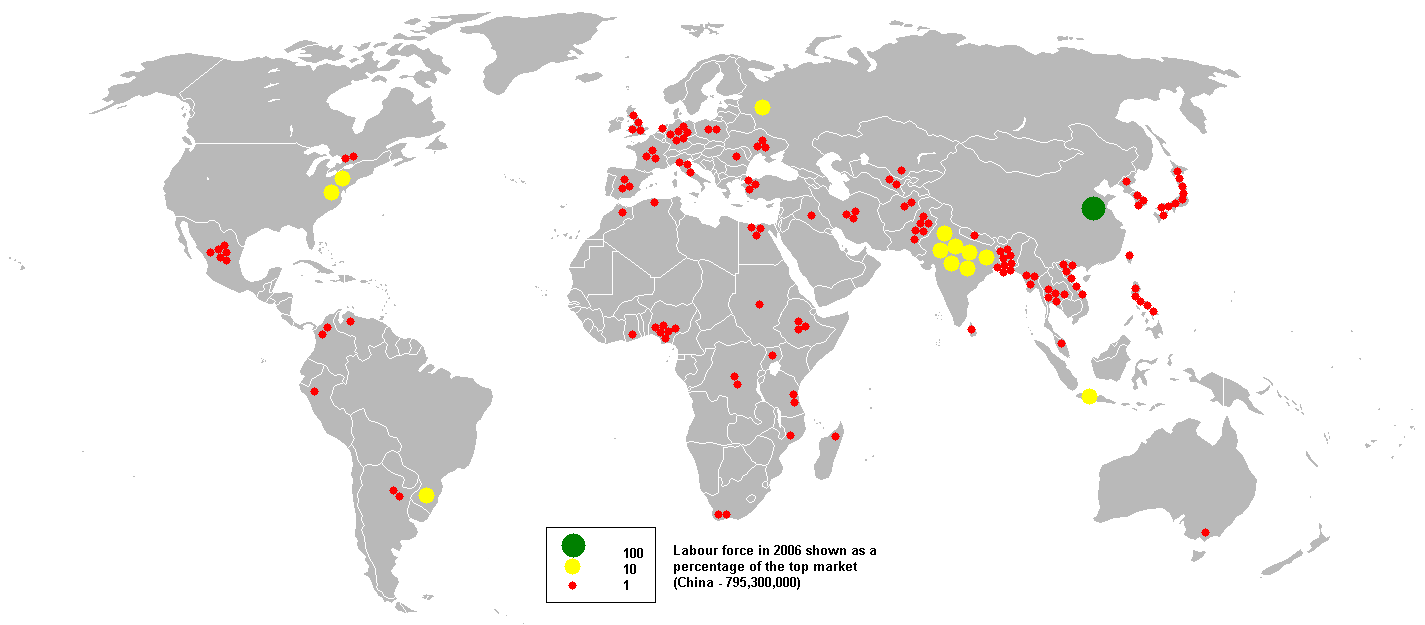
Labour force availability (as of 2006) map

Nepal has a labour force of 16.8 million workers, the 37th largest in the world as of 2017. Although agriculture makes up only about 28 per cent of Nepal's GDP, it employs more than two-thirds of the workforce. Millions of men work as unskilled labourers in foreign countries, leaving the household, agriculture, and raising of children to women alone. Most of the working-age women are employed in the agricultural sector, contributions to which are usually ignored or undervalued in official statistics. Few women who are employed in the formal sectors face discrimination and significant wage gap. Almost half of all children are economically active, half of which (almost a quarter of all children) are child labourers. Millions of people, men, women and children of both sexes, are employed as bonded labourers, in slavery-like conditions. Trade unions have played a significant role in bringing about better working conditions and workers' rights, both at the company level and the national government level. Worker-friendly labour laws, endorsed by the labour unions as well as business owners, provide a framework for better working conditions and secure future for the employees, but their implementation is severely lacking in practice. Among the highly educated, there is a significant brain-drain, posing a significant hurdle in fulfilling the demand for skilled workforce in the country.

The Ministry of Labour, Employment and Social Security governs the development of labour and employment policies in Nepal.

== Resources ==
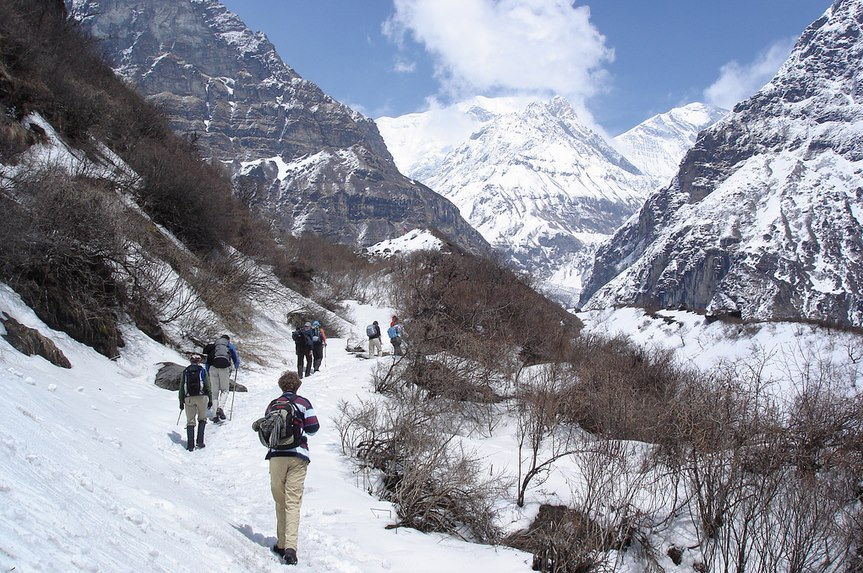
Tourists trekking in Annapurna region in western Nepal. Tourism plays a vital role in Nepal's economy.

Progress has been made in exploiting Nepal's natural resources, tourism, and hydroelectricity. With eight of the world's 10 highest mountain peaks, including Mount Everest at 8,848.86 m. In the early 1990s, one large public sector project and a number of private projects were planned; some have been completed. The most significant private sector financed hydroelectric projects currently in operation are the Khimti Khola (60 MW) and the Bhote Koshi Project (36 MW). The project is still undergoing and has dependency on China, India and Japan to take the further steps.

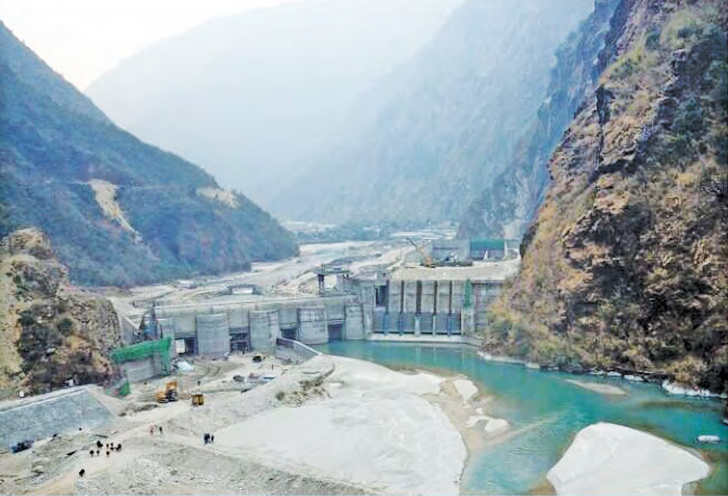
Upper Tamakoshi hydropower, biggest hydropower in Nepal.

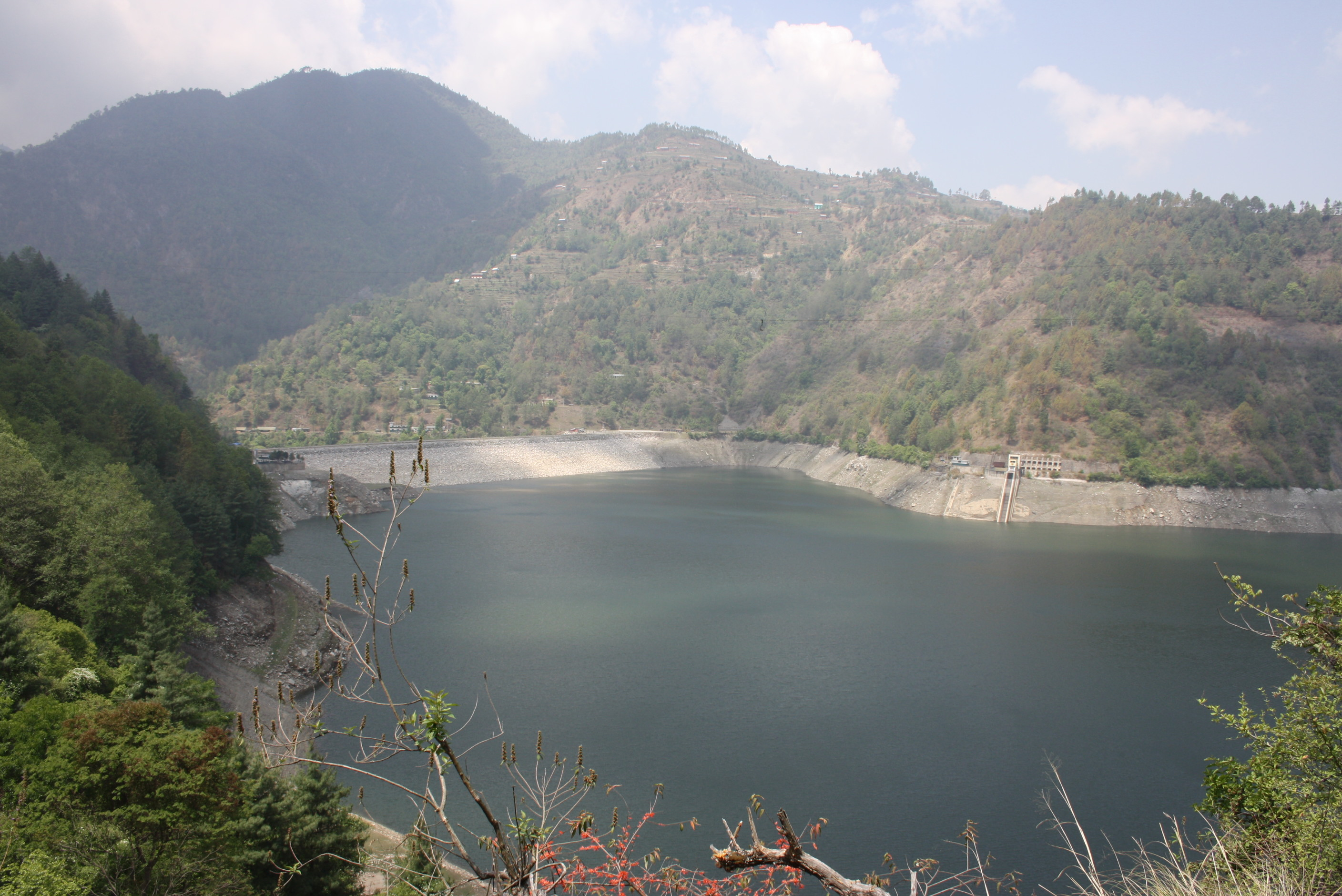
Kulekhani dam also known as "Indra sarobar"or "Kulekhani Reservoir" combinely producing 106 MW, in Makwanpur, Nepal

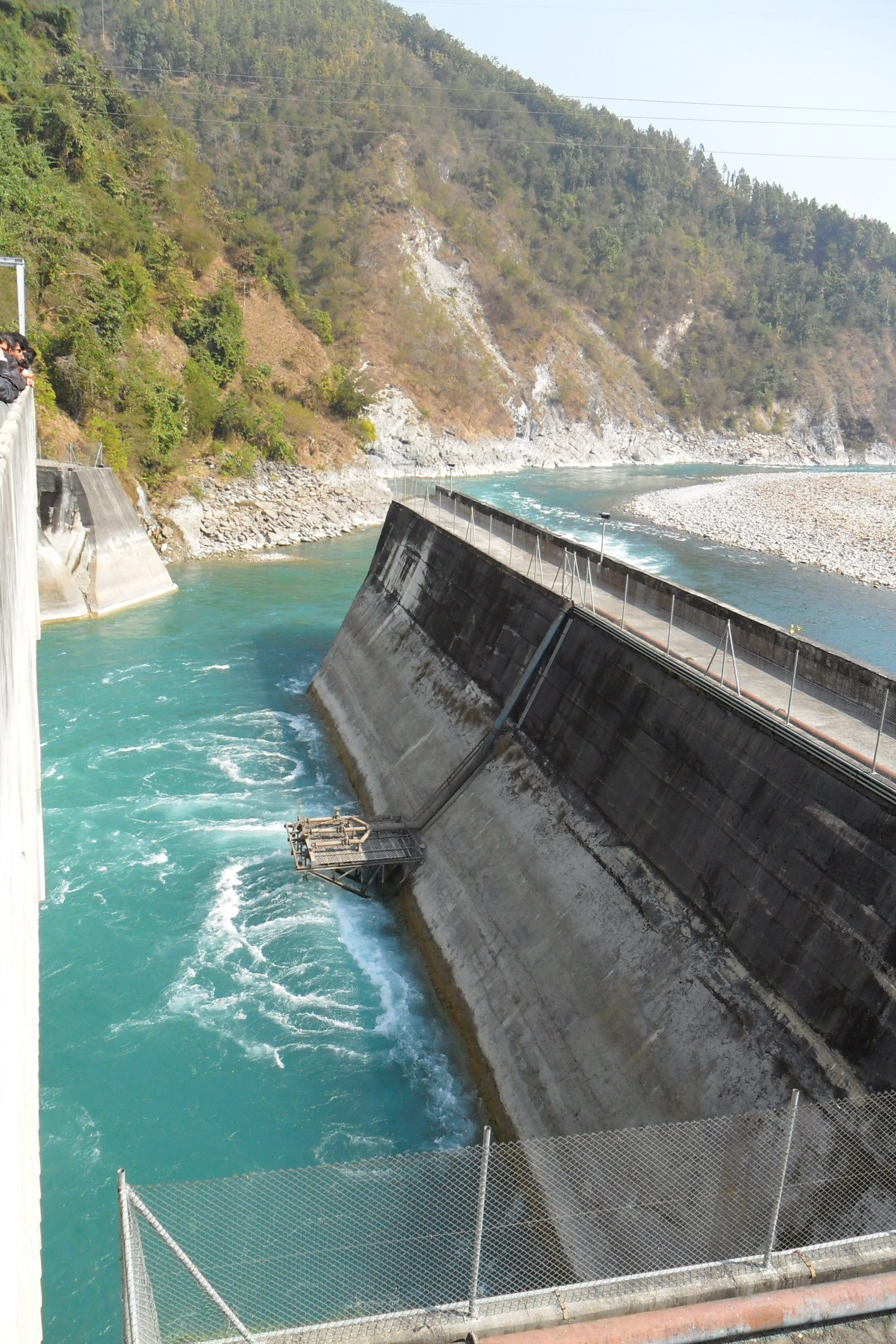
Middle Marsyangdi Hydropower Station, producing 70 MW. Nepal has significant potential to generate hydropower, which it plans to export across South Asia.

Nepal has 83,000 MW of theoretical and 42,133 MW of technically/financially viable hydroelectric potential, however the total installed capacity, at present, is 4105 MW and increasing.

The environmental impact of Nepal's hydroelectric Own calendar (Bikram Sambat) New year in mid- April projects has been limited by the fact that most are "run-of-the-river" with only one storage project undertaken to date. The largest hydroelectric plant under consideration is the West Seti Dam (750 MW) storage project dedicated to exports to be built by the private sector. Negotiations with India for a power purchase agreement have been underway for several years, but agreement on pricing and financing remains a problem. Currently demand for electricity is increasing at 8-10% a year whereas Nepal's option to have agreement with India will make this fulfilment against demand. As of June 2022 surplus electricity up to 364 MWp by Nepal is exported to India.

Population pressure on natural resources is increasing. Over-population is already straining the "carrying capacity" of the middle hill areas, particularly the Kathmandu Valley, resulting in the depletion of forest cover for crops, fuel, and fodder and contributing to erosion and flooding. Although steep mountain terrain makes exploitation difficult, mineral surveys have found small deposits of limestone, magnesite, zinc, copper, iron, mica, lead, and cobalt. Coal mining is also done with 11522 tones produced in 2018 alone.

The development of hydroelectric power projects also cause some tension with local indigenous groups, recently empowered by Nepal's ratification of ILO Convention 169.

== Macro-economic trend ==
This is a chart of trend of gross domestic product of Nepal at market prices estimated by the International Monetary Fund and EconStats with figures in millions of Nepali Rupees.

Year	Gross domestic product
1960	3,870
1965	5,602
1970	8,768
1975	16,571
1980	23,350
1985	46,586
1990	103,415
1995	219,174
2000	379,488

The following table shows the main economic indicators in 1980–2024. Inflation below 5% is in green.

Year	GDP (in billion US$ PPP)	GDP per capita (in US$ PPP)	GDP (in billion US$ nominal)	GDP growth (real)	Inflation (in Percent)	Government debt (in % of GDP)
1980	7.68	491	2.26	▼−2.3%	▲9.8%	n/a
1985	▲12.59	▲718	▲3.21	▲6.1%	▲4.1%	n/a
1990	▲18.37	▲936	▲4.44	▲4.6%	▲8.9%	n/a
1995	▲26.70	▲1197	▲5.38	▲3.5%	▲7.7%	n/a
2000	▲36.70	▲1494	▲6.54	▲6.1%	▲3.4%	▲50.8%
2005	▲49.01	▲1865	▲9.33	▲3.5%	▲4.5%	▼45.1%
2006	▲52.23	▲1969	▲10.32	▲3.4%	▲8.0%	▼42.9%
2007	▲55.47	▲2076	▲11.78	▲3.4%	▲6.2%	▼37.9%
2008	▲59.99	▲2232	▲14.31	▲6.1%	▲6.7%	▼36.8%
2009	▲63.10	▲2335	▲14.66	▲4.5%	▲12.6%	▲39.5%
2010	▲66.94	▲2465	▲18.25	▲4.8%	▲9.6%	▼35.4%
2011	▲70.66	▲2591	▲21.69	▲3.4%	▲9.6%	▼32.4%
2012	▲75.34	▲2756	▲21.70	▲4.7%	▲8.3%	▲34.5%
2013	▲79.32	▲2897	▲22.16	▲3.5%	▲9.9%	▼31.9%
2014	▲85.55	▲3115	▲22.72	▲6.0%	▲9.0%	▼27.6%
2015	▲89.78	▲3252	▲24.36	▲4.0%	▲7.2%	▼25.7%
2016	▲91.02	▲3267	▲24.52	▲0.4%	▲9.9%	▼25.0%
2017	▲100.97	▲3583	▲28.97	▲9.0%	▲4.5%	25.0%
2018	▲111.09	▲3897	▲33.11	▲7.6%	▲4.1%	▲31.1%
2019	▲121.06	▲4199	▲34.19	▲6.7%	▲4.6%	▲34.0%
2020	▲122.69	▼4180	▼33.43	▼ −2.4%	▲6.2%	▲43.3%
2021	▲134.00	▲4461	▲36.93	▲4.8%	▲3.6%	43.3%
2022	▲151.64	▲4964	▲41.18	▲5.6%	▲6.3%	▼42.7%
2023	▲160.16	▲5153	▼40.91	▲2.0%	▲7.8%	▲47.1%
2024	▲169.12	▲5348	▲43.67	▲3.1%	▲5.6%	▲49.7%

== Statistics ==
GDP: Purchasing power parity - $149.643 billion (2024 est.)

GDP - Real Growth Rate: 3.7% (2024 est.)

GDP - per capita: purchasing power parity (current international $) - $2700 (2017 est.) GDP - composition by sector:
agriculture: 17%
industry: 13.5%
services: 60.5% (2017 est.)
tourism: 9%

Population below poverty line: 20.3% (2022 est.)

Household income or consumption by percentage share:
lowest 10%: 3.2%
highest 10%: 29.8% (1995–96)

Inflation rate (consumer prices): 7.1% (2023 est.)

Labour force: 8.435 million (2024 est.)

Labor force - by occupation: agriculture 19%, services 69%, industry 12% (2014 est.)

Budget:
revenues: $5.954 billion
expenditures: $5.974 billion, including capital expenditures of $NA (2017 est.)

Industries: tourism, carpet, textile; small rice, jute, sugar, and oilseed mills; cigarette; cement and brick production

Industrial production growth rate: 10.9% (2017 est.):

Electricity - production: 41,083 GWh (2017)

Electricity - production by source:
fossil fuel: 7.5%
hydro: 91.5%
nuclear: 0.3%
other: 0.7% (2001)

Available energy:6957.73 GWh (2017) NEA Hydro:2290.78 GWh (2014) NEA Thermal:9.56 GWh (2014) purchase (total):2331.17 GWh (2014) India (purchase):2175.04 GWh (2017) Nepal (IPP):1258.94 GWh (2014)

Electricity - consumption: 4,776.53 GWh (2017)

Electricity - exports: 856 GWh (2001) Electricity - imports: 12 GWh (2001)

Oil - production: 0 barrels per day (0 m^{3}/d) (2001 est.)

Oil - consumption: 1,600 barrels per day (250 m^{3}/d) 2001

Agriculture - products: Fruits and vegetables, mostly: apples, pears, tomatoes, peaches, nectarines, potatoes, rice, maize, wheat, sugarcane, root crops, milk, and buffalo meat.

Exports: $1.29 billion f.o.b., but does not include unrecorded border trade with India (2020 est.)

Exports - commodities: carpets, clothing, leather goods, jute goods, grain

Exports - partners: India 56.6%, US 11.5%, Turkey 9.2% (2016 est.)

Imports: $1.6 billion f.o.b. (2021 est.)

Imports - commodities: gold, machinery and equipment, petroleum products, electrical goods, medicine

Imports - partners: India 70.1%, China 10.3%, UAE 2.6%, Singapore 2.1%, Saudi Arabia 1.2%. (2016 est.)

Debt - external: $9.1 billion (2022 est.)

Economic aid - recipient: $2 billion (FY 2019/20)

Currency: 1 Nepali rupee (NPR) = 100 paisa

Fiscal year: 16 July - 15 July

== See also ==
- List of companies of Nepal
- List of Nepalese provinces by GDP
- Corruption in Nepal
- Development regions of Nepal
- Ministry of Finance (Nepal)
- Ministry of Industry, Commerce and Supplies
- National Pride Projects
- Special Economic Zones (Nepal)
- Science and technology in Nepal
- Squatting in Nepal
- Economy of South Asia
