= Mineral resources of Nepal =

Nepal has been mining on a small scale for iron, copper, lead, zinc, cobalt, nickel and gold. Old mine pits, adits, smelting places and other remnants of mine processing are found all over Nepal. Some villages are named after mineral names, such as Taba Khani, Falam Khani, Shisa Khani or Sun Khani.

Before 1951 (2007 BS) Nepal was an exporter of iron and copper to Tibet and cobalt to India. At Thoshe iron deposit (Ramechhap), a gun manufacturing plant was established in 1921, but this is non-functional now. After the change of government in 1951, mining activities gradually closed.

Systematic geological mapping and mineral exploration were carried out by the Nepal Bureau of Mines, established in 1961, and by the Nepal Geological Survey, established in 1967. These two organizations were combined in 1977 and renamed as the Department of Mines and Geology (DMG). Mineral exploration activities were at their peak during 1969–1984. Some potential mineral resources identified by the explorations are listed below.

== Metallic minerals ==
Mineral	Location
Iron	Dhaubadi (Nawalparasi), Lalitpur (Phulchoki), Thoshe (Ramechhap), Labdhikhola (Tanahu), Jirbang (Chitwan), and Dhuwakot (Parbat)
Copper	Gyazi (Gorkha), Okharbot (Myagdi) and Wapsa (Solukhumbu)
Zinc	Ganesh Himal area (Rasuwa), Phakuwa (Sankhuwashbha), Libangkhairang, Damar, and Baraghare (Makawanpur), Pangum (Solukhumbu), Salimar valley (Mugu/Humla), Phulchoki (Lalitpur), Sishakhani and Khandebas (Baglung), Duwakot (Parbat) Bhalu Danda (Dhading), Kholakhani (Taplejung)
Cobalt	Netadarling and Tamghas (Gulmi) and Samarbhamar (Arghakhanchi)
Nickel	Bamangaun (Dadeldhura), Beringkhola (Ilam), Bauligad (Bajhang) Khoprekhani (Sindhuli)
Gold	Mahakali, Chamaliya, Jamari gad, Seti, Karnali, Bheri, Rapti, Lungrikhola and Phagumkhola (Rolpa), Kaligandaki, Myagdikhola, Modi, Madi, Marsyandi, Trishuli, Bhudhi Gandaki, and Sunkoshi
Silver	Ganesh Himal (Rasuwa), Barghare (Makawanpur), Bering Khola (Ilam)
Tin	Meddi and Genera (Dadeldhura) and Mandhukhola area (Makawanpur)
Uranium and other radioactive minerals	Thumki, Jagat, Panchmane, Gagalphedi, and Chunikhel in Shivapur area, Tinbhaangale, Chandi. Khola and Chiruwakhola (Makawanpur), Bukakhola (Sindhuli) Mardarkhola and Panpakhola (Chitwan), Jamari gad, Bangabagar, Baggoth, Gorang (Baitadi), and traces in a different section of the Chamaliya River (Darchula)
Bismuth	Dadeldhura and Baraghare and Mandukhola area in Makawanpur district
Cinnabar	Khimti River
Beryllium	Khaptad and different parts of Manang, Kathmandu, Nuwakot, Rasuwa, Phakuwa Hyakule, Ilam and Taplejung district
Tungsten	Dadeldhura and Makwanpur

== Non-metallic minerals ==
Mineral	Locations
Coal	Tosh, Siuja, Azimara and Abidhara in Dang, and few places in Salyan, Rolpa, Pyuthan and Palpa
Limestone	Khotang, Udayapur, Syangja, Palpa, Arghakhanchi, Dang, Pyuthan, Salyan, Rolpa, Bajhang, Baitadi, and Darchula
Dolomite	Dhankuta, Khotang, Udayapur, Sindhuli, Dolakha, Kavre, Kathmandu, Makawanpur, Dhading, Syangja, Palpa, Baglung, Gulmi, Arghakhanchi, Dang Pyuthan, Salyan, Rolpa, Rukum, Jajarkot, Surkhet, Dailekh, Jumla, Achham, Doti, Bajhang, Bajura, Baitadi, and Darchula districts in the Lesser Himalayan
Phosphorite	Dhick Gad, Junkuna, Morgaun, Sanagaun and Dhaubisaune areas in Baitadi, Far Western Nepal
Magnesite	Kampughat in Udayapur, Palpa, Baitadi, and Dolakha
Talc/Mica	Dhankuta, Langtang (Rasuwa), Bhumidanda and Khairenitar (Nuwakot), Chaukibhanjyang (Kathmandu), Nibuwagaun (Sindhupalchok) Khaptad (Bajhang), Baskot and Bhasukan (Doti), Fical (Ilam)
Pyrite (sulphur)	Bering Khola (Ilam), Chhirlingkhola (Bhojpur), Meddi and Bamangaun (Dadeldhura)
Graphite	Illam, Dhankuta, Sankhuwashbha, Nuwakot, Sindhupalchowk, and Dadeldhura
Granites	Makwanpur (Palung, Ipa and Narayanthan), Sindhuli, Udaypur, and Dadeldhura
Marble	Godavari (Lalitpur), Chhatre Deurali (Dhadhing), Anekot (Kavre)
Quartz crystals (SiO_{2})	Jajarkot, Dailekh, Dhadhing, Rasuwa, Nuwakot, Sakhuwasabha, Ilam and Taplejung districts
Rubies and sapphire	Chumar, Ruyil, Shelghar, Pola, Shongla in Ruby valley in Dhadhing and Lari/ Ganesh Himal(Rasuwa)
