= Gold mining in Nepal =

Gold is mined in a primitive way in Nepal. The locals pan the gold from the river sediments in the banks of major rivers mainly Mahakali river, Jamari Gad, Chameliya River, Karnali River, Rapti River, Bheri River, Phagum Khola, Madi River, Kali Gandaki River, Marshyangdi river, Budhi Gandaki River and Sunkoshi River. A major gold occurrences is found in Lungri Khola around the banks at Bamangaon, Jamarigad and Gorang Bangabagara. The alluvial plains in the south are also considered to have a deposit of gold.

== Deposits ==
According to the report by Chararji in 1935, the estimated gold deposit in Kali Gandaki River is about 413,487 grams of gold. In Another study led by JR Manandhar in 1958, a potential gold exists in the banks of Modi River.

The ratio of gold to sediment is about 6.7gm/ton in Rolpa district which is considered the most potential source of gold in Nepal.

== Traditional miners ==
Sonaha community has been traditionally associated with gold mining in the banks of Karnali River.

== Industrial exploration ==
- In 2018, a Chinese company made a survey in bank of Bheri river in Jajarkot for any feaseable gold deposit.

== See also ==
- Mineral resources of Nepal
