= Special Economic Zones (Nepal) =

Special Economic Zones are geographic areas inside Nepal that have been allocated to promote and diversify the export based industries. It was conceptualized by Nepal Government in 2013 and laws were formulated in 2016 in the form of the Special Economic Zone Act (2016). The laws were subsequently revised in 2019. The industries inside the Special Economic Zones are given various facilities and in return they have to commit to export a minimum of 60% of their production to the foreign market.

== Background ==
The trade deficit was gradually increasing in Nepal, which is the main reason for setting up the zones.

In the eighth five-year plan (1992–97), Nepal formulated policies to reduce the deficit by introduction of various policies that would directly or indirectly help to promote exports and establishment of industries. These policies included environment, investment, transit and logistics, transport and trade facilitation. In 2000 AD, the first zone was established in Bhairahawa to manufacture mineral-based products and kitchen utensils. Later, an Export Processing Zone (EPZ) was established in Simara mainly to process garments.

== Key features ==
- The zones are regulated by the Special Economic Zone's Authority with their own set of rights and regulations.
- The industries are allowed to sell 100% of the production or service inside Nepali for the first year. From the second year, the export has to be 60%. The export was 75% in the initial act and was revised later on the request of entrepreneur.
- The infrastructural setup inside zones is taken care by the Nepal Government. Facilities such as road, electricity, water and others amenities are maintained as well.
- The industries have to rent the land inside the zone for their industries. The rental charge depends on the place. For instance, the monthly rental charge at Bhairahawa is NPR 20 (US$0.2) per square meter.
- The industries inside the zone are exempted from the Custom duties, VAT and other taxes.

== Locations ==
The zones are located in following areas:

Province	Location	Allocated area (Bigha)
Koshi	Damak, Jhapa	2600
Madhesh	Murtiha, Sarlahi	1565
Bagmati	Mayurdhap, Makawanpur	300
Gandaki	Chyalingtar, Gorkha	300
Lumbini	Motipur (Rupandehi), Naubasta (Banke), Dharna and Laxmipur (Dang)	1,877
Karnali	Surkhet	1,000
Sudur Pachhim	Daiji, Kanchanpur	900

== See also ==
- Economy of Nepal
