= Coal mining in Nepal =

Deposits of coal are found in Tosh, Siuja, Azimara and Abidhara in Dang, and a few other places in Sallyan, Rolpa, Pyuthan and Palpa districts of Nepal. The total estimated deposits are about 5 million tons. Due to the low volume of deposits, mining is done by traditional methods. The mines have been exploited since the early 1960s; however due to lack of proper markets, they are not exploited to their full capacity.

== Deposits ==
Geologically, the main coal deposits can be categorized into:

- Quaternary Lignite deposits of Kathmandu Valley
- Siwalik coal found in the Sub-Himalayas
- Cretaceous-Eocene coal and Gondwana coal found in the Lesser Himalayas

The coal in the Sub-Himalaya (Siwalik/Churia) has some radioactive minerals mixed in the coal.

== Production ==
There are 11 small scale coal mines that are in operation scattered throughout Nepal. Some additional licenses are issued by the government for exploration. The annual production is shown in table below.

Year	Production (metric tons)
2009/10	7,867
2010/11	9,935
2011/12	10,499
2012/13	13,838
2013/14	8,151
2014/15	6,754
2015/16	2,900
2016/17	7,025
2018	11,522

== Environmental concerns ==
Some lands have started to cave-in and some landslides have been triggered near the mining area. Also, the ground water has dried up. This has caused conflict between locals and mine operators.

== See also ==
- Natural resources of Nepal
- Mineral resources of Nepal
