= West Seti Dam =

- Location within Nepal
- Country: Nepal
- Location: Far-Western Development Region
- Coordinates: 29°21′32″N 80°46′16″E
- Status: Proposed

Dam and spillways
- Type of dam: Concrete faced rockfill dam
- Impounds: Seti River
- Height: 195 m (640 ft)

Reservoir
- Total capacity: 1,566,000,000 m^{3} (1,270,000 acre⋅ft)
- Active capacity: 926,000,000 m^{3} (751,000 acre⋅ft)
- Inactive capacity: 640,000,000 m^{3} (520,000 acre⋅ft)
- Catchment area: 4,022 km^{2} (1,553 mi^{2})
- Surface area: 20.6 km^{2} (8.0 mi^{2})
- Maximum length: 25.1 km (16 mi)

Power Station
- Hydraulic head: 259 m (850 ft)
- Turbines: 4 x 187.5 MW Francis-type
- Installed capacity: 750 MW

The West Seti Dam is a proposed hydroelectric dam on the Seti River in the Far-Western Development Region of Nepal. The power station would be located approximately 63 kilometres (39 mi) upstream of the Seti River confluence with the Karnali River, with the dam site located a further 19.2 kilometres (11.9 mi) upstream. All project sites, excluding the reservoir area and transmission line corridor, are located in either Doti and/or Dadeldhura Districts. The reservoir area is located in Doti, Dadeldhura, Baitadi and Bajhang Districts. The transmission line corridor is located in Doti, Dadeldhura, Kailali and Kanchanpur districts.

== Design ==
The dam would be a 195-metre (640 ft) high concrete-face rock-fill dam. The dam's catchment area covers the upper 4,022 square kilometres (1,553 sq mi) of the Seti River Basin and its reservoir volume would be 1.5 km^{3} (1,200,000 acre⋅ft) of which 926,000,000 m^{3} (751,000 acre⋅ft) would be active (or "useful") storage. The reservoir's surface would cover an area of 20.6 km^{2} (8.0 mi^{2}) and stretch 25.1 km (16 mi) up river. To produce power, the design calls for a 6.7 km (4 mi) long headrace tunnel which would divert water around 19.2 km (12 mi) of the river's bend to the power station. The power station would have a rated capacity of 750 MW. The drop in elevation from the reservoir to the power station would afford a hydraulic head of 259 m (850 ft).

== Background ==
The dam was to be built by Snowy Mountain Engineering Corporation (SMEC) under West Seti Hydropower Company Limited (WSHPL). However, in June 2011 the Government of Nepal terminated the construction license after SMEC's decision to stop funding & it was linked to the lack of interest shown by CMEC and ADB to pour in money in the mega project. In 2010, WSHPL has lost two important investors, the Asian Development Bank and China National Machinery and Equipment Import and Export Corporation. A campaign by organizations opposing the dam also impacted construction. The dam is opposed based on its impact of the environment and relocation of residents. In May 2011, China Three Gorges Corporation (CTGC) has expressed its interest in developing the project. In December 2011, Nepal's Ministry of Energy proposed a public–private partnership after CTGC's interest. An official stated "The government is committed to construct the project at any cost".
