= Simara =

Simara may refer to:

- Simara, Sarlahi, a village development committee in Sarlahi District, Nepal
- Simara Bhawanipur, a village development committee in Rautahat District, Nepal
- Simara, Bara, a town in Bara District, Nepal
- Simara Airport, an airport in Nepal
- Simara Island, an island in the province of Romblon, Philippines
