= Childbirth in Nepal =

This article provides a background on Nepal as a whole, with a focus on the nation's childbearing and birthing practices. While modern Western medicine has disseminated across the country to varying degrees, different regions in Nepal continue to practice obstetric and newborn care according to traditional beliefs, attitudes, and customs.

== Background ==
=== Health and illness theories ===
Indigenous Nepali theories of illness differ from that of the modern Western world. They do not believe in the germ theory; instead, they believe that illness is caused by malevolent powers that enter the body, disturbing the normal balance and creating sickness. It is up to the healer (dhami-jhankris) to try to release the malevolent power that is causing disease and restore balance in the body system to make it function normally again. These indigenous beliefs are similar to the faith healing traditions still practiced today. Faith healing is based on the belief that illness is due to attacks by different types of spirits. The healers must identify the type of spirit and make an offering to appease the spirit or forcibly remove the spirit with a spirit bone (usually a human femur). These rituals often include colorful costumes, chanting, singing, dancing, and drumming, as well as a sacrifice of a rooster or a black goat. These ceremonies are done by dhami-jhankri (shamans), pandit-lama-gubhaju-pujari (priests of different ethnic and religious groups), and jyotishi (astrologers).

There are two other main healing traditions in Nepal, namely Ayurveda, Tibetan medicine, and faith healing. Ayurveda is based on the tridosha theory of disease, where the three doshas, or humors, are Vata (wind), Pitta (gall) and Kapha (mucus). Disturbance is the equilibrium of these humors results in disease. The traditional healers can be divided into faith healers and medical providers. The medical providers include Baidhya-Kabiraj, who use elixirs, metal preparations and herbs to treat illness, and Jadi-butiwala, who only use herbs for treatment. Tibetan medicine (gso ba rig pa) is based on the belief that the physical world, including our bodies, are a product of our individual perception, and it is the mind that brings on illness to the body. The Tibetan medical practitioners, Amchis, help direct the patient towards increased self-awareness to restore balance and harmony between the body and the forces of the universe.

=== Health statistics ===
The current total population sex ratio in Nepal is 0.98 males/female. Female life expectancy at birth in 68.92 years, compared to 66.18 years for males. The fertility rate is 2.24 children born per woman, and the birth rate is 20.64 births per 1,000 people. The mother's mean age at first birth is 20.1 years old. 49.7% of the population use contraception. It is unclear what the abortion rate is in the country, likely because it is considered taboo, so women are less likely to report it.

Maternal mortality rates have dropped significantly from 539 per 100,000 live births in 1996 to 258 deaths per 100,000 live births in 2015. For this achievement, the country has been honored at the 2010 Millennium Development Goals Review Summit. Leading causes of maternal mortality are postpartum hemorrhage (46%), obstructed labor (16%), complications of pregnancy induced hypertension and eclampsia (14%), and puerperal sepsis (12%) in 2015. 67% of maternal mortality occurs at home, 11% occurs at a health facility, and 11% occur on the way to a health facility. 90% of maternal deaths occur in a rural setting.

There has been an increase in the percentage of births attended by skilled personnel (doctors, nurses, midwives), from 4% in 1990 to 53% in 2015. Skilled birth attendance (SBA) in the urban setting is 72.7%, compared to 32.3% in the rural setting. SBA among the poorest 20% of the population is 10.7%, whereas among the richest 20% of the population, it is 81.5%.

The under-five mortality rate has dropped from 142 deaths per 1,000 live births in 1990 to 42 deaths per 1,000 live births in 2012. Infant mortality (under-one) is 39.14 deaths per 1,000 live births. Neonatal mortality rate is 24 per 1,000 live births.

== Pregnancy behaviors and beliefs ==
=== Prenatal care ===
According to UNICEF, 58.3% of women have at least one antenatal care visit and 50.1% have at least four visits. However, other studies have shown coverage in rural communities to be as little as 29% and upwards of 79% in more urban areas. On average, each session lasts about 10 minutes, with an emphasis on health education and counseling. Physical examinations and blood pressure measurements were also performed in 85-95% of cases, but biochemical tests including urine analysis and sero-testing for syphilis were not always performed. The main topics discussed during the visit ranged from nutrition, personal hygiene, and general reassurance that "everything is all right". Fortunately, 76% of women were informed of signs of pregnancy complications. Similarly, taking a woman's history focused solely on the current pregnancy, rather than including questions about possible previous experiences. As such, complications were never asked nor were they consistently followed up with referral practices in the rural communities. Preventive interventions have vastly improved over the past two decades. Eight in ten women now take iron supplements during pregnancy. Though improvements can be made as only 55% took intestinal parasite drugs.

Within the past two decades, the government and NGOs have come together to tackle the low prenatal care rates in an effort to improve maternal and child morbidity and mortality outcomes. One such tactic, the Safe Motherhood Initiative, is providing financial incentives for pregnant mothers to come to their prenatal care check-ups. These types of programs pay anywhere from 500 and 1,500 Nepali Rupees or $5 - US$10, depending on the region. Other incentives include providing free services for maternal related issues and having a 24-hour delivery service. Through the national increase on funding of these particular health concerns, there have been large improvements concerning the 5th Millennium Development Goal (as evidenced under Health Statistics).

However, modern medicine continues to struggle against the traditions upon which antenatal care has previously been done. Excluding geographical access, some other reasons quoted for non-use of maternity services include: cultural barriers, perceived low quality of care, perceived discrimination of rural people, and lack of perceived health gain. Many pregnant women feel threatened, unaware, or uneducated about the benefits that a prenatal check-up could bring. For some, the risk-benefit of one day of work and one day of prenatal check-ups is the deciding factor. For example, a woman who works in the agricultural fields may not feel it is worth sacrificing a whole day's work in order to seek antenatal care, especially in the absence of a mother-in-law's perceived concern regarding the pregnancy.

=== Social expectations ===
Thus, this feeling of "going through it alone" is paramount throughout the entire childbirth experience. Even if women are anxious about the birth outcome (survival or death), they emphasized that it was something they had no control over, believing birth is in God's hand. As such, pregnancy and birth needed no preparation. Due to the societal expectation of women as bearers of children and careers of the family, the practice of giving birth traditionally (i.e. vaginally) was safe and even empowering for women if done in a goth (small out-building near the main house or lower section of the main house for animals). Similarly, losing a child was an unfortunate but expected part of continuous pregnancy and childbirth in these villages. Infertility and death was also prevalent and reasoned to be because the gods were angry with them for committing a very serious sin. This natural process conflicts with the medical model and many hospitals and health centers have to negotiate with these local cultural and spiritual beliefs before providing care to these women.

=== Preparation for birth ===
Overall, women do not prepare much for birth. Especially if they are delivering alone, they will not have the time nor the funds to adequately prepare for labor and delivery. They will, however, work right up until the onset of labor. This is mainly due to the deeply entrenched gender roles that women must do household labor. Even if husbands wished to help lighten the workload, they are unable to do so. This constant movement provides added stress and contributes to the already lacking nutritional status of these women, further increasing the risk for poor birth outcomes.

Families will sometimes help clear an animal shed in anticipation of labor. Generally, this means moving the animals to another place, sweeping up the dung and dirt, laying down clean dry grass or hay, and covering it with a plastic sheet or blanket.

Some traditional birth attendants and skilled professionals will have a pre-made pregnancy kit ready. The kits contain gloves, a small piece of soap, five squares of gauze, a small blade, three pieces of string, a small plastic sheet, and a sandwich-sized bag. However, this practice is not consistently among TBAs as one study found only 2% used them consistently and correctly.

=== Extrinsic factors ===
There are several extrinsic factors that affect the quality and quantity of prenatal care among Nepalese women. The highest predictor is related to location and socioeconomic status. While most people live in rural areas (83.4%), they are at a higher risk for stillbirth, childhood malnutrition, chronic energy deficiency among women, and generally poorer maternal and mortality outcomes. This is partially due to the lack of financial resources prevalent to devote to maternal care, but also partially due to the resources available within the community to tackle this health topic. For example, 40% of the water is from an unprotected source. Similarly, 35% have an open sanitary facility as a designated location for elimination and 35% cook in the living area of dwelling. These are risk factors for infection and respiratory issues that only increase in women who are pregnant. Furthermore, 78% of women are laborers and 55% of women considered their work to be of a moderate workload. These jobs increase the strain on a pregnant mother's health by losing energy that is not being adequately compensated by dietary intake, using an upright posture that may diminish uterine blood flow and affect supply of oxygen and nutrients to fetus, and adding mental stress related to maternal work outside the home that may affect intrauterine growth and gestational duration. Along with the personal behavior of 30% who are smokers and 7.6% who consume alcohol, these women are at a very high risk for complications.

== Labor ==
=== Location ===
Predominantly, labor takes place within the home. Though 90% live within 5 km of a health facility, women choose to labor and birth wherever the livestock is kept because of social concepts of deities, cleanliness, and sin. Essentially, cultural and spiritual traditions say the household deity will get angry if it takes place in the home because periods of menstruation and childbirth are considered to be polluted days. If it does not take place in the animal shed but in the home instead, the woman must perform rituals to ask for forgiveness from the deity. Regardless, health problems may result by not following the rules of the house. Families also prefer the animal shed because it is easier to clean the shed before and after the delivery than any ground floor due to the lack of any artificial flooring. This allows family members to dig up and throw out any blood-contaminated soil or mud after the delivery procedure.

As for the hospital/health centers, women will only go in an absolute emergency. Some common reasons they deem necessary include: prolonged labor, retained placenta, and excessive bleeding. Most recently, women are coming more and more to these medical facilities for the financial incentive rather than for the care and monitoring provided. Overall, pregnant mothers feel uncomfortable in a hospital because it is too cold, they are not well acquainted with the staff, no relatives are allowed to stay for the delivery, and it is not convenient for them. Furthermore, they believe TBAs are more experienced anyway. However, those who live in central, urban areas are more likely to go to a hospital or health center due to increased awareness and increased resources available to them.

=== Beliefs ===
Nepalese women largely believe the whole birth process is a part of life and of God's plan. As such, labor begins when God deems it so. A common saying, "Jun Bela Bela Unhi Bela Chela" means that childbirth will occur on its own time, hence no attendance is needed. However, estimated length of labor is largely determined based on prior experiences and stories of the mother-in-law and other close female family members.

=== Extrinsic factors ===
Extrinsic factors dictating how and where labor occurs is largely based on personal behavior (i.e. prior experiences and personal beliefs). Some prior experiences include: cesarean delivery, vaginal birth, and satisfaction with a traditional birth attendant or other health professional. As for personal beliefs, women of Chhetri or Thakuri ethnicity and more illiterate, older, and of higher parity were more likely to follow high-risk birth practices especially if the husband was also illiterate. Once again, education, socioeconomic status, access to healthcare, and transportation were other extrinsic factors that changed the course of labor and subsequently, birth. As for the labor process itself, women commonly eat cumin seed soup and drink glucose water while sleeping and moving to the women's liking. Particular breathing is not emphasized as much as helping a woman through whatever emotions she is feeling. Sexual activity is not prevalent during this time.

=== Pain management ===
During the first stage of labor, the birth-attendant may start using a mustard-oil massage on the woman's abdomen, hands, feet, and head. This not only helps the mother with the pain, but it also helps show the child through the birth canal. During the second stage of labor, the birth-attendant may provide pressure on the woman's rectum with her thumb as the woman pushes. Medical management of pain is rarely found in home births, but analgesia (i.e. epidural) is prevalent in the hospitals. Touch, in the form of massage, is the main means of pain management in the more rural settings.

=== Labor attendants ===
Women often birth alone or with the help of female relatives or traditional midwives. One study found that 56% of all Nepalese births are assisted only by relatives and friends. However, they are likely untrained and will use unsafe delivery practices like cutting the cord with unclean razor blades or tying them dirty ties and smearing cow dung or ash onto the cord.

Thus many birthing mothers pray for a simple labor due to the lack of health professional assistance nearby. Some reasons cited for not having skilled attendance at antenatal and delivery care include: transportation problems, lack of knowledge about service benefits, distance to the healthcare facility, and user fees. Some extrinsic factors influencing the presence of skilled attendance include: sociodemographic (age, education, residential area) and economic status. 31% of those who had unskilled attendance had no antenatal visit or care. The lack of people in the birthing room means there is a dark, calm atmosphere for the baby to come into.

Reasons for wanting a solo home birth include: wanting a natural process, going through a polluted period, and increased self-confidence doing it alone. The idea of self-confidence and not needing anybody else is most strongly prevalent among multiparous women, having already done it previously without any help.

Previously, husbands have been unable to support women during childbirth due to cultural tradition deeming it solely the woman's responsibility. However, the capital of Nepal has recently allowed husbands to support their wives during childbirth in the hospitals. This can be attributed to the increasing trend towards a nuclear family, migration to the capital, a busy lifestyle, and exposure to educated couples and foreign ideologies that has shifted family dynamics from the relatives to just the couple themselves. Especially considering the husbands have the final say in medical decisions, this will better equip them to understand the situation prior to having to make difficult decisions concerning her health and the baby's.

=== Supportive behavior ===
Supportive behavior has typically been very limited due to the common belief that their "deity will get angry if they touch the polluted woman". Depending on the region, this polluting period presents at different stages of labor and birth. For some, it commences right when the membrane ruptures, but for others it occurs right when the child is separated from the mother. This polluting period continues into the postpartum period, where seclusion may be present for up to 6–15 days post-birth. This cultural belief in separation makes it very hard for many women to call traditional birth attendants to help. According to one TBA, "they call sometimes [only] because no one wants to touch the women during and after the delivery". Similarly, another TBA stated that a woman was nearly in shock after a placenta had not been expelled two hours post-birth because nobody was willing to touch her to help. However, in many rural villages other women will come support by providing food, water, and massage support. This differs greatly from the medical practice found in hospitals where supportive behavior is more medical intervention. In this case, the cultural beliefs are still prevalent and must be negotiated on a family by family basis.

== Birth ==
=== Health care provider/birth attendant ===
36% of births are assisted by a skilled provider (doctor, nurse, or midwife). Another 11% are assisted by a traditional birth attendant. The former option is much more common in urban areas (73%) than in rural areas (32%). Health services that involved first-level health workers were more common in hospital deliveries compared with home deliveries.

Maternity services in first-line units (antenatal care and delivery care) were provided by staff nurses that had three years of training and auxiliary nurse midwives that had training for 18 months. In primary health centers, there were auxiliary nurse midwives and in health posts and subhealth posts there are maternal child health workers with 10 weeks training. For traditional birth attendants, training widely varies and can best be categorized into training and non-training. 18% of the overall TBAs in Nepal are untrained and the rest were trained. Differences among TBAs arose in clean delivery practices (i.e. hand washing practices) and standardized identifiers for maternal complications like excessive bleeding, prolonged labor, and retained placenta.

=== Decision making power ===
Primarily, the locus of decision-making power lies with the husband in rural communities. If the husband is not present, it falls to the next male figurehead present (father-in-law, father, brother, etc.). As mentioned previously, this is difficult because many times the husband does not watch the labor and birth and is uneducated about maternal health. Therefore, they are largely uninformed when making decisions about transportation, access, and procedures for mother and baby.

However, up to two-thirds of women in urban areas report they have sole or joint decision-making power over their own health care. Oldest women and those from the wealthiest families are most likely to participate in these decisions, especially in the Central Hill, Mid-western Hill, and Eastern Terai areas. Some factors influencing a woman's ability to make her own decisions regarding healthcare include: higher education, more decision-making power in a household, and higher income.

=== Location ===
Just over one-third (35%) of births in Nepal occur in health facilities. They most commonly occur in Eastern terai (50%) and Western terai (48%) regions. One may go to a private or public hospital or clinic, but costs are generally higher at private ones. The remaining two-thirds of births occur at home due to the aforementioned belief in the natural process and lack of perceived need for a health facility service. Home births are skewed in areas of rural regions (67%) compared with urban areas (28%) due to various factors including access, cost, and awareness of delivery care. On the other hand, birthing centers are starting to increase, but are still rarely used currently. UNICEF has supported the establishment of 12 birthing centres in Humla as one of many plans to increase access to women in more rural, remote villages in Nepal.

=== Birth position ===
While there is no specific position preferred for the first stage of labor, the woman often alternates from sitting to standing to walking to sleeping. As for the second stage of labor, the woman is prone on the hands and knees. This allows the TBA to put pressure on the woman's rectum with her thumb while the woman pushes. In addition, it results in easier childbirth and prevents perineal tearing. Mothers who birth alone also like it because it is easy and does not require assistance from others.

=== Placental delivery ===
The most commonly used instruments for cord cutting include a sickle, knife, bamboo stick, and razor. These instruments are rarely washed thoroughly before and after being implemented. If placental delivery is not occurring, some methods used to remove the placenta include procedures that require internal manipulation. This can be anything from pulling on the umbilical cord to inducing choking or vomiting in the mother. Once the placenta is removed and cut, mustard oil and turmeric are often used for cord dressing. Depending on the ethnic backgrounds, different customs are applied for the disposal of the placenta. Some believe that if the placenta touches the soil, or if an animal eats the placenta, the child will fall ill. So many tend to bury the placenta or throw it into thick bamboo bushes.

=== Extrinsic factors ===
As mentioned previously, food and drink is provided during labor with soup or glucose water. Oil massages are given as psychological/emotional support while relaxing the muscles. Personal behavior differs where it comes to positioning and pain management, though it largely is influenced by family members and location/type of services provided.

=== Behavior for complications, abnormalities ===
The population-based caesarean section rate is around 4.6%, but varies greatly depending on the region. Higher cesarean rates are prevalent in more urban populations, due to proximity of health services and hospitals while lower rates are found in more rural rates. The most common complications are prolonged or obstructed labors, placenta retention, and immediate postpartum hemorrhage. Prolonged or obstructed labor is beyond the skills of mothers and TBAs, though many try attempting internal manipulation without proper cleaning and without wearing a glove. Mothers may request an abdominal massage, oil on head, soup to drink, or perform rituals of worship to speed up the process. In placenta retention, most attendants will wait up to 1–2 hours before various measures are implemented. Some measures include abdominal massage, induction of vomiting, fundal pressure, cord traction, and manual removal. To induce vomiting, someone sticks hair or finger down her throat. Sometimes, water or soup of bitter herbs is given to the mother to drink. For immediate postpartum hemorrhage, TBAs describe a hard mass in the lower abdomen following delivery that they massage and squeeze. Others refer the case without delay due to the risk. However, in both cases foods like millet puwa (millet flour, cumin seed, pepper, clove, cinnamon and coriander) and mustard oil are mixed with turmeric.

=== Use of technology ===
As mentioned previously, the C-section rate is 4.6% as of 2012. According to one study, the zonal hospital was equipped with 75% of the essential equipment and drugs based on a 22 item reference list. At a home birth, the midwife/nurse equipment and instruments are the only technology typically used (which are the ones found in the safe delivery kits).

== Postpartum ==
The postpartum period begins right after the baby's birth and can last up to 6 months, during which time the mother's body undergoes significant changes to return to its prepregnant state. It can be divided up to 3 phases: acute period (first 6–12 hours after delivery), subacute period (2–6 weeks), and delayed postpartum period (last up to 6 months). This delineation of the postpartum period is based on modern Western medicine, and is not specific to Nepal.

Over two-thirds of births occur at home in Nepal and they go through the postpartum period at home as well. However, when these "home" births often occur in the goth, or the cowshed, because they believe that the mother is impure during delivery and postpartum and can pollute the people and objects in the house. It can also upset the household deities, which may manifest as sickness or complications for the mother or baby. For some women, they may stay on the straw on the floor of the shed for 20 or more days after childbirth, after which they are allowed to go inside the house. For those who deliver in health facilities, it is unclear how soon after delivery they return home.

=== Rite of passage to announce status ===
During the initial few days after birth, the mother is not allowed to receive any guests. After this period, the family hosts a ceremony (machu bu benkyu) between the fourth and twelfth day after birth, during which time the baby is introduced to the father and the rest of the extended family. Congratulations and gifts are accepted and the baby is ceremoniously massaged in mustard oil and its eyes outlined in gajal (soot from an oil lamp and butter) to protect its eyes.

=== Nutrition ===
All food is prepared by other female members of the family or the maid; the mother is not allowed to cook during the postpartum period. Nepali mothers eat a very specific diet of jhol (bitter tasting buttery chicken broth) and specifically cooked meat and vegetables, which are to help with recovery and production of nutritious breast milk. They also drink restorative ayurvedic remedies and food low in salt to help flush out excess water in the tissues. The mothers strictly adhere to this diet for at least 2 months.

=== Sleep and wakefulness, rest, activity, and movement ===
Nepali mothers are secluded with their babies right after delivery because they are considered polluted. This is called the sutkeri period and lasts three to eleven days. It is believed that this seclusion is necessary because the mother and baby are vulnerable to evil spirits and disease. This also provides the time for mother and baby to bond. After this seclusion period, the father of the baby and the mother in law often make decisions regarding the mobility of the woman.

During the postpartum period, the mother is massaged to encourage shrinking of the uterus and stimulate production and flow of breastmilk. This is initially done by the midwife, and later passed on to a family member.

Among indigenous Newar cultures, new mothers go on a traditional postnatal holiday two weeks after the birth. They leave the home of their in-laws for the first time and enjoy two or more months of rest and pampering by other women. They are not allowed to work at home or in the farmlands during this time. Instead, she enjoys daily massages and sunbathing. This period of rest allows the mother to completely recover physically and mentally, adjust to hormonal changes and to her new role as a mother.

=== Contraception ===
In one study, they found that fewer than 20% of postpartum women initiated contraceptive use within 6 months of return of fecundity, and the percentage slowly increased to 34% by the 12th month. The methods of contraception used include injectables (40%), condoms (16%), traditional methods (16%), oral contraceptive pills (15%), female sterilization (10%), IUDs (3%) and implants (2%). Factors that increased the likelihood of contraceptive initiation after birth included women reporting autonomy in household decision making, use of contraception prior to pregnancy, ages 25–34 (compared to ages 15–24), and high wealth and education status.

Another study found that women who received postpartum counseling immediately after birth were more likely to use contraception than those who received counseling 3 months after birth or no counseling at all.

=== Postnatal care ===
Postnatal care is a vital part of maternal and newborn care because life-threatening complications can occur following delivery. Only 30.1% of women receive postnatal checkup within 2 days of delivery, and 45% of mothers and 32% of their babies receive some postnatal care within the first week of delivery. This care is usually provided by a nurse or midwife. Factors that make it more likely for women to receive postnatal care are delivery in a health facility, living in an urban area, living in Terai region, higher socioeconomic status and higher level of education.

=== Postpartum depression ===
In a study of Nepalese women done in 2015, postpartum depressive symptoms were found among 30% of women. Mothers aged 20 to 29 years, did not have a history of pregnancy-induced health problems or subjective feelings of stress were less likely to have depressive symptoms than mothers who were older or did not those problems or feelings of stress. Other significant factors associated with postpartum depression include husband's alcoholism, polygamy, previous depression, multiparity, smoking and depression during pregnancy.

== Newborn ==
The newborn period begins when the baby delivered. It is not specified when this period ends. The mother is the main caregiver of the baby. In some households, they hire a didi (maid).

Upon delivery in home births, the umbilical cord is either cut with a razor blade provided in the clean home delivery kits distributed in Nepal, or with a kitchen knife or household sickle, which isn't normally sterilized. The umbilical stump is left undressed or sometimes dressed with oil. The baby is then wrapped in old but cleaned cloth. Most babies are bathed (92%) and wrapped (94%) within an hour of birth. 59% of infants born outside of health facilities were wiped prior to the placenta being delivered.

=== Rites of passage ===
Because of Nepal's rich historic, cultural and religious background, there are many traditions and rituals that its people practice.

In the Kathmandu Valley, the indigenous Newar people practice life-cycle rituals as rites of passage for both mother and newborn. Right after birth, the mother is secluded in a dark room with her baby. She cannot bathe, comb her hair, or look in the mirror. Food without salt is brought to the mother. The aji (midwife) comes to not only provide postpartum care, but also to perform machu bu benkyu, the baby's first life-cycle rite to receive the blessings of Chwaasa Ajima, the Goddess of childbirth. Without the blessings of the Goddess, the baby may suffer from endless crying bouts and failure to thrive. This ritual is conducted between four and twelve days after birth, and is a way to formally introduce the newborn to its father and the rest of the family. It also marks the end of the mother's confinement period. During this ceremony, the baby is bathed in plain water and massaged with mustard oil. It is then wrapped in a clean scrap of cotton sari. At the end of the ritual, the baby is massaged in oil, its eyes outlined with gajal (soot from an oil lamp and butter), and its forehead marked with a black tika. The gajal is believed to beautify and clear the baby's eyes. This is how the baby is formally accepted as a member of the family.

Another ceremony common in Nepalese culture is nuwaran, which is when the child is named. An astrologer providers a letter based on the baby's time of birth, and its name must begin with that letter. The astrologer also determines the number of syllables in the name. This usually occurs on the 8th day after birth for a girl, and 9th day for a boy.

=== Food and drink ===
Breastfeeding is the norm is Nepal, with 98% of children ever breastfed. 44.5% of mothers initiated breastfeeding within an hour of delivery. The rate of exclusive breastfeeding for the first 6 months is 69.6% and rate of breastfeeding at age 2 is 92.6%. The median duration of exclusive breastfeeding is 4.2 months, while for any breastfeeding, in addition to complementary foods, is 33.6 months.

Pashni is the rice feeding ceremony that occurs on the 5th month after birth for a girl and 6th month for a boy. The child is fed rice pudding by family members from a silver bowl with a silver spoon. With this ceremony, the child is no longer exclusively breastfed and can eat mashed food. The specific auspicious time for this ceremony is determined by an astrologer.

=== Rest, activity, and movement ===
After the baby is born, it is kept in a dark, quiet room with its mother for several days. The baby is massaged from the first day onwards to recreate an environment similar to the womb. The massage occurs twice a day as it is believed to have healing effects on the baby and reduce typical infant complaints like colics.

=== Circumcision ===
According to the World Health Organization (WHO), fewer than 20% of Nepalese males are circumcised.

=== Mortality rates ===
The under-5 mortality rate has dropped from 142 per 1,000 live births in 1990 to 42 deaths in 2012. Infant mortality (under-1) is 39.14 deaths per 1,000 live births. Neonatal mortality rate is 24 per 1,000 live births.

Mortality rates are much higher in rural (55 deaths per 1,000 live births) than urban (38 deaths per 1,000 live births) areas. It is also higher in the northern Mountain Regions and the Far-western region. The median birth interval in Nepal is 36 months, which reduces the risk of infant death. However, 21% of infants are born less than 2 years after the previous birth, which increases the risk of under-5 mortality.

Children's nutritional status has improved over the years in Nepal, but the rates of malnutrition continue to be high. 41% of children under 5 in 2011 were stunted as a result of malnutrition, with higher concentrations in rural areas (42%) than urban areas (27%) and in the Western mountain (60%) than in Central hill and Eastern terai (31%). Percent of stunting has declined since 2001, when 57% of children under 5 were too short for their age. 29% of children under 5 were underweight in 2011, compared to 43% in 2001.
