= Squatting in Nepal =

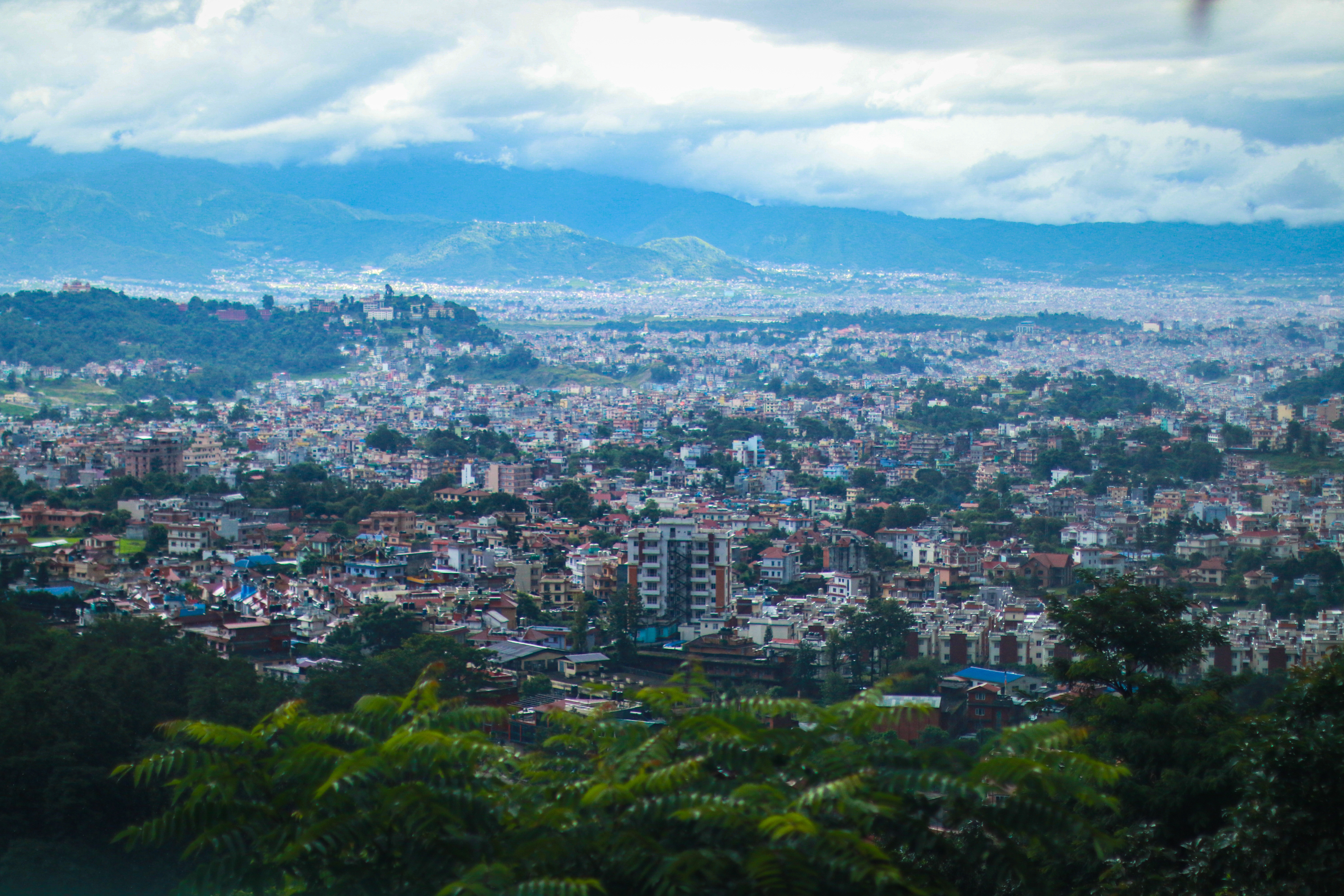
Kathmandu Valley as seen from the top of the hill

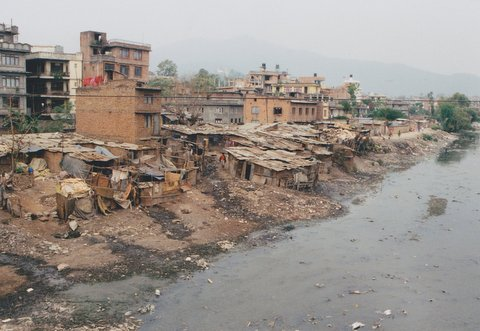
Shacks by the river in Kathmandu

Squatting in Nepal occurs when people live on land or in buildings without the valid land ownership certificate (known as a Lal Purja). The number of squatters has increased rapidly since the 1980s, as a result of factors such as internal migration to Kathmandu and two decades of civil war. Nepal has environmentally protected areas and there have been instances of people being displaced from their homes when they are created. In 1996, the government introduced the National Action Plan, which proposed upgrading informal settlements. Squatters are called sukumbasi, but the word has negative connotations and is not used by squatters themselves.

== History ==
Squatting in Nepal is the occupation of property without a valid land ownership certificate (known as a Lal PurJa), or renting property when the purported owner does not have the certificate. Poor migrants moving from the countryside to the capital Kathmandu inhabited temples and public buildings up until the 1980s, then informal settlements appeared from the late 1980s onwards. The squatters had migrated from rural areas and were unable to find other options for housing. There were an estimated 2,000 squatters in the capital Kathmandu in 1985 and three years later the total was 3,700. By 1992, the number was thought to be between 8,000 and 10,000; four years later, the total had risen to 12,000 with 9,000 living in informal settlements and 3,000 in derelict public buildings.

Since the Nepalese Civil War began in 1996, people displaced by the conflict have moved to Kathmandu. Occupations first occurred on public land beside rivers and later private land was also seized. By 2003, Kathmandu had 63 squatter settlements, with between 20,000 and 40,000 inhabitants. During the state of emergency from 2001 until 2004, the government evicted squatters from Tin Kune, Shankhamul and Thapathali. In 2019, according to the Nepal Landless Democratic Union Party, there were 29,000 squatters in the Kathmandu Valley living in 73 sites.

Nepal has environmentally protected areas and there have been instances of people being displaced from their homes when they are created. When the Sukla Fata wildlife reserve was enlarged in 1981, 3,000 families were evicted. Whilst some were resettled, many began squatting in the forest nearby. People have also been displaced from Bardiya National Park and Chitwan National Park. The Bankariya are an endangered indigenous people of Nepal, with a population of 93. They have stopped their forest dwelling way of life and live on land leased from the government, but do not possess the Lal PurJa. They are regarded as squatters when they enter their former lands in what is now the Parsa National Park.

People have also migrated from mountainous regions to the Terai, a lowland area, squatting on the edge of forests, beside rivers and on public land. The Squatters' Problem Solving Commission (SPSC) has attempted to regularize the settlements by providing a land ownership certificate where possible. In Sunwal, there are informal settlements at Kerabari, Ramuwapur, Simaltari Charpala, Sirjanatole and Sundarbasti. During the COVID-19 pandemic, the lockdown resulted in poor squatters who normally earn money from scavenging being unable to feed themselves. In 2022, there were estimated to be 35,000 squatters beside the Bagmati River in the Kathmandu Valley. They refused to leave their homes until they were offered security of tenure elsewhere. In 2024, the Supreme Court of Nepal ordered that they must be rehoused and the task was handed to the Ministry of Urban Development and the High Powered Committee for Integrated Development of Bagmati Civilization (HPCIDBC).

== Legal ==
In 1996, the government introduced the National Action Plan, which proposed to upgrade informal settlements. Squatters are called "sukumbasi" but the word has negative connotations and thus is not embraced by squatters themselves. Squatters can be occupiers, squatter-landlords who rent out accommodation or squatter-tenants who rent property; as well as being motivated by housing need, squatters can be land speculators or entrepreneurs. The Government of Nepal amended the Land Rules in December 2020 so that all squatters and landless Dalits could receive title to land, subject to certain conditions. The Landless Squatters' Problem Resolution Commission announced urban squatters in the Kathmandu Valley could receive up to 130 m^{2} (1,400 sq ft) of land and elsewhere in the country up to 340 m^{2} (3,700 sq ft). In agricultural areas, squatters could be given up to 2,000 m^{2} (22,000 sq ft) and in the mountains, 3,000 m^{2} (32,000 sq ft).

The chairperson of the Commission on Landless Squatters stated in 2021 that all landless squatters would receive ownership certificates within the following eighteen months. It estimated that across the country there were 2.1 million people living without land rights. The following year, an editorial in the national newspaper República argued that the issue of housing squatters had become politicised and over 30 years, different commissions had not solved the problem.

== Re-location (2026–present) ==
In 23 April 2026, newly formed government under Prime Minister Balen Shah of Rastriya Swatantra Party (RSP) issued a order for eviction of squatters living alongside the river banks of rivers in Kathmandu Valley, the sudden eviction notice made a controversial headline throughout the nation creating a fear and confusion among the people living in those settlements. Opposition parties and social activists raised concerns over the intention of government to demolish the squatter settlements. Government's spokesperson Sasmit Pokharel addressed the concerns saying the re-location will take peacefully and without use of any force. Authorities announced near the settlement to clear the area and come in contact with government agencies for their re-location in various locations around the valley and gave a deadline till the night of 24th April, 2026. On the morning of 25th April, 2026 huge number of security forces were deployed for the eviction to be carried out peacefully, first phase of the demolition of the settlement began from Thapathali and Gairigaun where more than 1,600 people had been residing in 777 huts, the people were then taken to Dasharath Stadium for the collection of data of families living in the settlement. Pre-arrangements were made by Kathmandu Metropolitian City for their safe reloaction. Unlike previous attempts marked by clashes and protests, no incidents were reported this time making the process completely peaceful.
