= Sisakhani, Kavre =

Sisakhani शीसाखानी
- Village development committee
- Location in Nepal
- Coordinates: 27.47°N 85.64°E
- Country: Nepal
- Zone: Bagmati Zone
- District: Kavrepalanchok District

Population (1991)
  - Total: 1,654
- Time zone: UTC+5:45 (Nepal Time)

Sasakhani is a village development committee in Kavrepalanchok District in the Bagmati Zone of central Nepal. At the time of the 1991 Nepal census it had a population of 1,654 in 263 individual households.
