= Sunkhani, Nuwakot =

Sunkhani सुनखानी
- Village development committee
- Location in Nepal
- Coordinates: 27.84°N 85.32°E
- Country: Nepal
- Zone: Bagmati Zone
- District: Nuwakot District

Population (1991)
  - Total: 2,340
- Time zone: UTC+5:45 (Nepal Time)

Sunkhani is a village development committee of the Nuwakot District in the Bagmati Zone of central Nepal. In the 1991 Nepal census its population of 2340 people lived in 437 households. One major attraction is the Shanti Dharma Stupa, a 15-metre high memorial stupa built in memory of those who died in the April 2015 Nepal earthquake by a religious group called Honmon Butsuryu Shu to help propagate Buddhist ideas of peace, happiness and general social welfare.
