= Squatting in Asia =

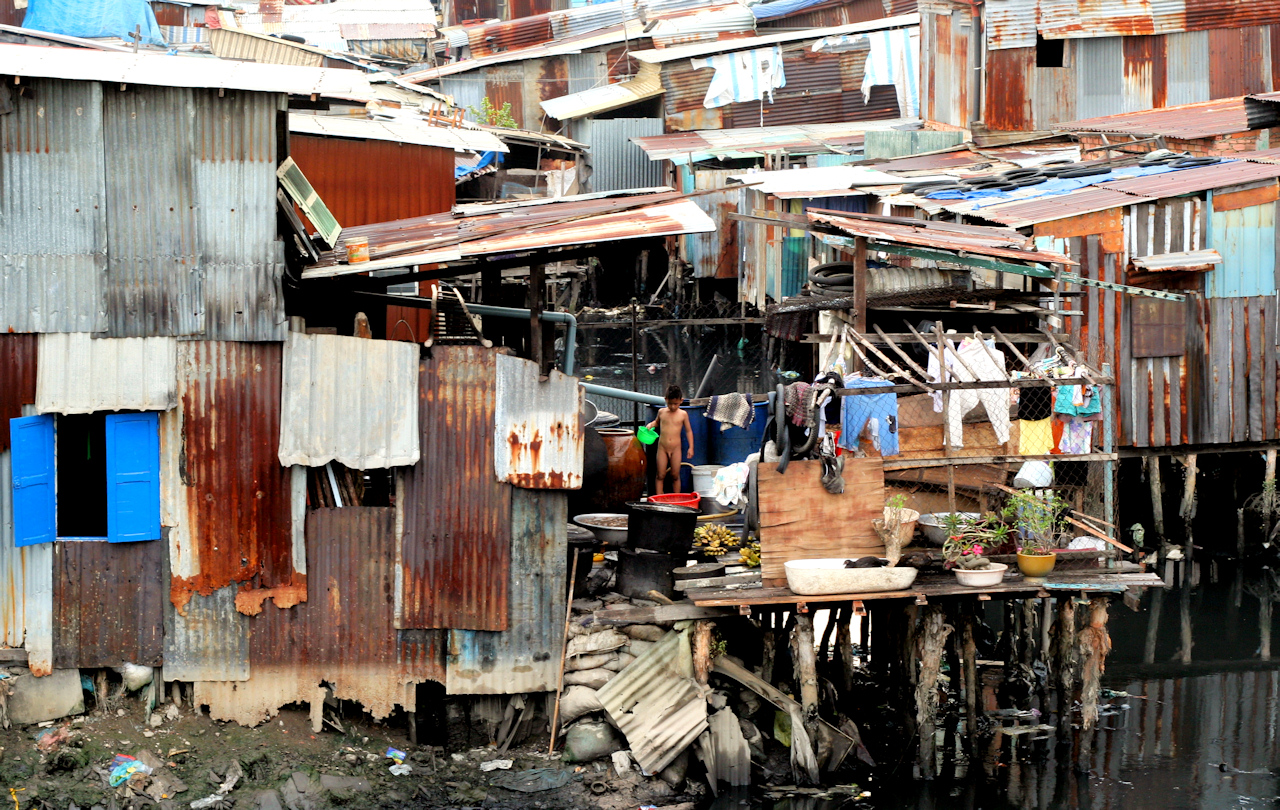
Slums in Ho Chi Minh City, Vietnam

Squatting in Asia occurs when land or buildings are occupied without formal right of tenure. Following the end of World War II and the collapse of many colonial regimes, there was a huge net migration from rural to urban areas across Asia, which resulted in people living in informal settlements. By the 2010s, places such as Hong Kong and Singapore succeeded in reducing the number of squatters, whereas in Bangkok and Jakarta still have high numbers. Factors such as war and natural disaster can result in displacement and squatting.

== Overview ==
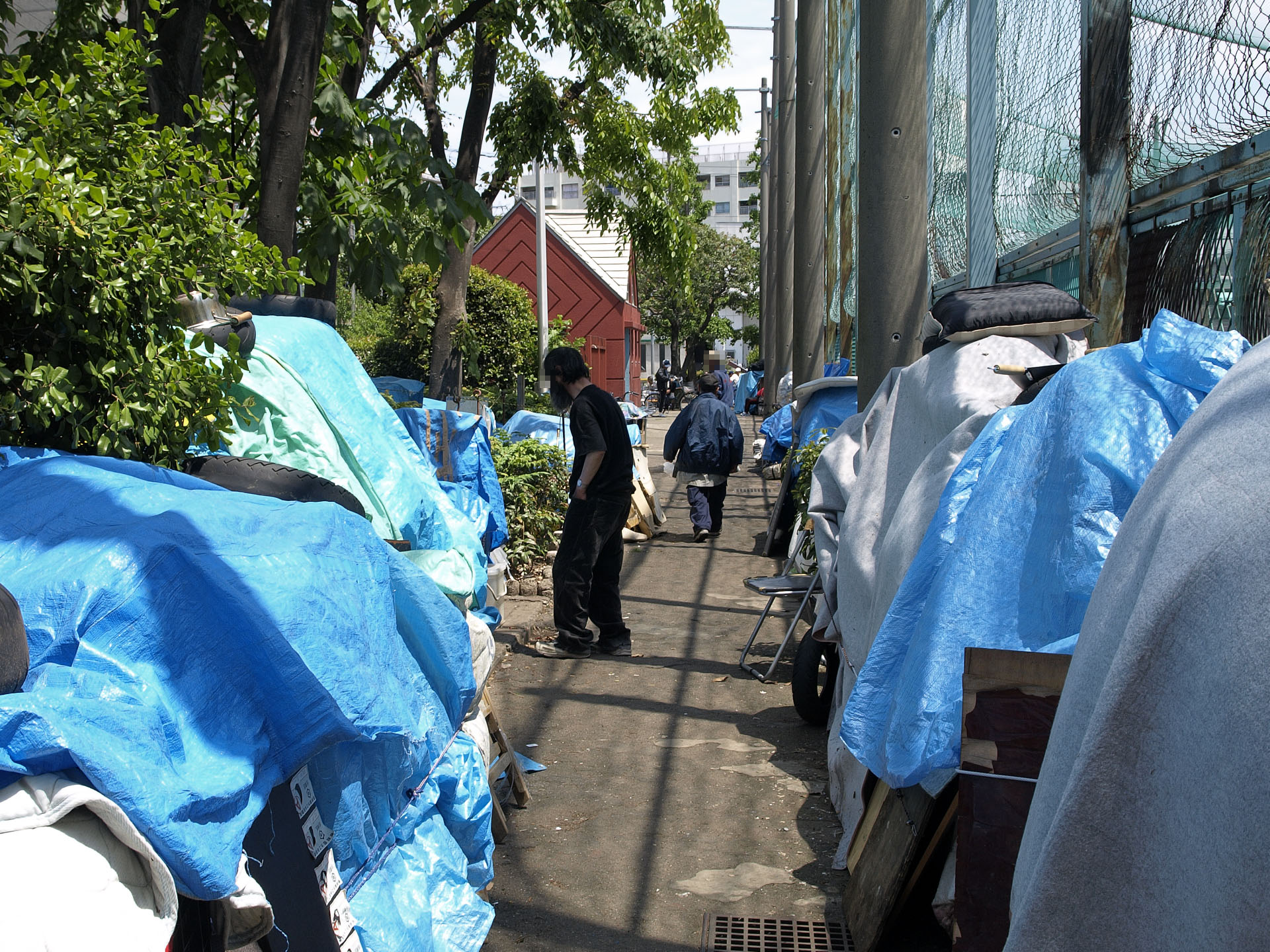
Pavement dwellers in Japan

Asia has a history of squatting which reaches back to ancient times. Archaeologists have documented evidence of Bronze Age squatters in what is now Jordan at Tall al-Fukhår and Tell Brak in modern-day Syria. In the sixth or seventh century, churches were constructed on the islands of Dalma, Marawah and Sir Bani Yas in the Persian Gulf; after they fell out of use, there is evidence that squatters occupied them.

Following the end of World War II and the collapse of many colonial regimes, there was a huge net migration from rural to urban areas across Asia. This urbanization process was not necessarily in response to demand for labour and many migrants were forced to find shelter in informal settlements, which were often squatted, meaning that people lived there without formal right of tenure. The number of residents in Jakarta, the capital of Indonesia, increased from almost 3 million in 1961 to over 4.5 million a decade later. By 2014, the Jakarta metropolitan area had 28 million people, of which between 20 and 25 per cent were squatters, whilst Bangkok in Thailand had an estimated population of between 9 and 10 million of which 20 to 30 per cent were squatting. The United Nations Human Settlements Programme (UN-HABITAT) notes that people living in informal settlements can experience poverty and sub-optimal services. As states have moved from repressing squatters to incorporating them into formal housing structures, by the 2010s places such as Hong Kong and Singapore succeeded in reducing the number of squatters, whereas in Bangkok and Jakarta still have high numbers.

Factors such as war and natural disaster often result in displacement and thus squatting. As a result of the First Nagorno-Karabakh War around 800,000 Azeri refugees from Armenia, Nagorno-Karabakh and the surrounding Azeri provinces (captured by Armenian forces from Karabakh by 1994) were forced to take any option for shelter such as squatting by the roadside, paying for hotels or living in tent cities. Thousands of refugees squatted Azeri homes and were tolerated by the authorities, which insisted that they would return home eventually to Nagorno-Karabakh. By 2010, residents of the capital Baku were protesting that they wanted their homes back. A World Bank report on housing in Baku stated there were various types of informal settlements including inner city squatter housing and upgraded squatter settlements. Jordan has experienced three waves of mass immigration following the 1948 Palestine war, Six-Day War (1967) and the Gulf War (1990–1991) which placed a strain on housing capacity. After the Six-Day War the Jordanian government's department of statistics recorded that there were 140,000 refugees squatting in Amman as well as 109,000 in United Nations camps. During the Syrian civil war which started in 2011, 2.3 million Syrians fled the country and only 20 per cent of this total entered refugee camps, with the rest finding other housing solutions which included occupying derelict factories in Lebanon.

By 2003, 70 per cent of Kabul in Afghanistan had been destroyed by what became the 2001–2021 war in Afghanistan and Médecins Sans Frontières reported there were tens of thousands of squatters, living without adequate food supply and medical facilities. Conflict has also displaced many people from their homes across the country. In 2019 alone the United Nations estimated 600,000 people had been forced to move. In addition, three million Afghans have returned from neighbouring countries Pakistan and Iran since 2015. Many of these people have ended up in squatted informal settlements. As of 2018, 78 per cent of the people living in 34 cities were slum dwellers and most of the housing stock was informal. In the 2000s, the Afghan authorities had attempted to provide housing through the Ministry of Urban Development and Housing (MUDH) but demand far outstripped supply and so in the 2010s, the policy switched to slum upgrading. The Special Land Dispute Court was founded in 2002 to arbitrate cases regarding disputed land ownership (including squatting).

East Timor became a country in 2002, after previously being occupied by first Portugal and then Indonesia. Following the independence struggle, the new state had no land registry and no process for squatters to be evicted. This created problems as people displaced by war returned to their homes to find them occupied by squatters, who in some cases had rented them out and wanted a monetary settlement before leaving. Land claimaints can be broken into four groups, namely those who currently possess land, those claiming land they owned under Portuguese rule, those claiming land they possessed under Indonesian rule and people asserting customary or traditional land rights. In 2006, conflict again broke out and 100,000 people were displaced; as before, when residents returned to their homes they found them squatted.

In Mongolia, pastoral nomads live in ger (yurts). Severe weather disasters known as dzuds have resulted in herds dying and many nomads have moved to living in their ger in informal settlements ringing the capital Ulaanbaatar. The majority (61 per cent) of Ulaanbaatar's population of 1.1 million people live in ger, which tend to have electricity but not sanitation. Nepal has protected areas and there have been instances of people being displaced from their homes when these areas are created. When the Sukla Fata wildlife reserve was enlarged in 1981, 3,000 families were evicted. Whilst some were resettled, many began squatting in the forest nearby. People have also been displaced from Bardiya National Park and Chitwan National Park.

== Naming ==
Squatted informal settlements go by a variety of names: in Bangladesh, they are known as 'bastees'; in Iran 'koukhnishinan'; in Kyrgyzstan 'novostroyki'; in Pakistan 'bastis' or 'katchi abadis'; in South Korea 'P'anjach'on'. In the Khmer language, "squatter" means an anarchist and "squatters settlements" literally translate as 'places where anarchy and confusion reign', therefore squatters in Cambodia are officially referred to by different names, such as the "urban poor" or "temporary residents". After the Khmer Rouge was ousted in 1975, many people returned to Phnom Penh and began living in their old houses or squatted informal settlements if their homes were already occupied. Until the end of the 1990s, the Phnom Penh authorities did not recognise squatters and tended to evict squats. As of 2003, an estimated 25 per cent of the city's population were squatters.

== Legal approaches ==
After the French conquest of Vietnam, the French colonial empire introduced land tenure rights which favoured settler colonialists. The 1946 constitution introduced by Hồ Chí Minh's Democratic Republic of Vietnam set up private land ownership and this was then overturned by the 1980 constitution which gave ownership of all land to the state. A 1963 Government circular had regularized squatting on land owned by the state by making the squatters tenants. The state then introduced the possibility to buy and sell land with the 1993 Land Law, although by 2001 it had not still given out titles; despite this confusion over ownership rights, Ho Chi Minh City has a thriving real estate market.

Adverse possession in Afghanistan can be achieved after 15 years of continuous possession, although there are exceptions to the rule. In Indonesia, the doctrine applies to state land only and squatters can apply for it after ten years of continuous possession.

== See also ==
- Squatting in Iraq
- Squatting in Kazakhstan
- Squatting in Malaysia
- Squatting in Sri Lanka
