= 65th Airborne Special Forces Brigade =

Brigade of the Islamic Republic of Iran Army

- تیپ ۶۵ نیروهای ویژه هوابرد
- Unit badge
- Founded: 1959
- Allegiance: Iran
- Branch: Islamic Republic of Iran Army
- Type: Airborne forces, special forces
- Role: Special operations Irregular warfare Hostage rescue Counter-terrorism; Reconnaissance
- Size: Brigade (8 battalions)
- Part of: 23rd Commando Division (until 1991)
- Garrison/HQ: Baghshah (formerly); Afsariyeh; Mehrabad International Airport
- Nickname: "Green Berets" (کلاه سبزها) "Powerful Ghosts" (اشباح قدرتمند) "The Eagles" (عقاب ها)
- Colors: Green
- March: 18 April (National Army Day)
- Engagements: Dhofar Rebellion; Post-Revolution clashes in Iran; Iran–Iraq War; Sistan and Baluchestan insurgency Syrian Civil War; 2026 Iran war

Commanders
- Current commander: Brigade General Ali Muhammadi

Aircraft flown
- Multirole helicopter: Bell 214; Bell UH-1N Twin Huey (Bell 212)
- Transport: Lockheed C-130 Hercules; Boeing CH-47 Chinook

65th Airborne Special Forces Brigade (Persian: تیپ ۶۵ نیروهای ویژه هوابرد), or the NOHED Brigade (تیپ نوهد), is an airborne, special forces unit of the Iranian Army established in 1959.

The unit's first operation was during the Dhofar Rebellion in Oman. After the 1979 Revolution in Iran, it was a participant in the post-Revolution clashes. As part of the 23rd Commando Division, the unit was extensively used in various operations of the Iran–Iraq War of the 1980s. The Brigade has been used in the Sistan and Baluchestan insurgency. During the Iranian intervention in the Syrian civil war, some of its members were actively deployed in the Syrian Civil War. The brigade has also been employed for hostage rescue and counter-terrorism purposes inside Iran.

== Formation ==
In 1953, 10 Imperial Iranian Army officers were sent to France for parachute training. After returning to Iran, they established the Parachute Unit (واحد چتربازی) in 1955, which evolved into the Parachute Battalion (گردان چتربازی) in 1959. In the same year, the 23rd Special Forces Brigade (تیپ ۲۳ نیروهای ویژه) was established, consisting of 5 operational battalions, one support battalion, one communication platoon, one base company, and an unconventional warfare school. In 1970, the unit was renamed the 23rd Airborne Special Forces Brigade (تیپ ۲۳ نیروهای ویژه هوابرد). A year later, a hostage rescue unit and a psychological warfare company were added to the structure of the brigade. The establishment of the brigade was under supervision of American advisors from John F. Kennedy Special Warfare Center & School. The legacy is still evident in the brigade's green berets and qualification badge, which is nearly identical to the US Army Special Forces' De oppresso liber unit insignia.

After the 1979 Revolution, the brigade turned into the 23rd Division (لشکر ۲۳), also known as the 23rd Commando Division (لشکر ۲۳ تکاور). In 1991, the 3rd Brigade was separated from the division and the 65th Airborne Special Forces Brigade (تیپ ۶۵ نیروهای ویژه هوابرد), or the 65th NOHED Brigade (تیپ ۶۵ نوهد) was formed with Afsariyeh as its headquarters. It is sometimes simply called NOHED Brigade (تیپ نوهد). The word NOHED (نوهد), also transliterated as NOWHED, is the Persian acronym for Nīrūhāye Vīzheye Havābord (نیروهای ویژه هوابرد), meaning "Airborne Special Forces". After the Nojeh coup plot in 1980 which was planned to be done using the NOHED unit, then-Parliament-member Hassan Rouhani called for disbanding the unit in the parliament, saying that "they are dangerous". Defense minister Mostafa Chamran strongly opposed.

== Operational history ==
During the Dhofar Rebellion in Oman, the unit, which was being called 23rd Airborne Special Forces Brigade, was one of the Iranian units participated in the war. It was stationed at the Mantson Dhofar military base in Oman.

The brigade is reported to be involved in the Vietnam War as well, but this has not been officially confirmed. According to Brig. Gen. Alireza Sanjabi, most of the training of the brigade was conducted through joint operations with the British SAS. According to an Al-Monitor article, he shared a story before his death about him operating as a sniper in the war.

After the 1979 Revolution, the brigade participated in various clashes in provinces of Khuzestan, Sistan and Baluchestan (fighting drug trafficking and terrorism), and Kordestan (fighting PJAK and Komalah). When Iraq invaded Iran, the brigade, which was the 23rd Airborne Special Forces Brigade back then and later turned into the 23rd Division, was stationed in southern and north western regions. They participated in various operations, including Breaking of the Siege of Abadan, Operation Beit ol-Moqaddas, Operation Karbala-5, and Operation Qader. The brigade was active in strategic mountains of Dopaza and Laklak in Sardasht, which Iraq, despite conducting chemical attacks in the area, never managed to capture the area during the eight-year war. Some personnel of the brigade were involved in special operations under direct command of Defense Minister Mostafa Chamran, who founded the Irregular Warfare Headquarters.

In the 1990s, there was a mock military operation in Tehran, planned by Army's commander Ali Sayyad Shirazi, where two battalions from the 65th Brigade were asked to infiltrate and take hold of specific important military and political centers in the capital city. The mission was accomplished in less than two hours. Ever since, the unit's members have been known as the "Powerful Ghosts".

Jane's Sentinel Security Assessments reported that the 23rd Special Forces Division is amongst the most professional formations in the Iranian Army, with 5,000 personnel, all of whom are believed to be regulars.

There have been unconfirmed reports of members of the 65th Brigade conducting reconnaissance operations in Iraq, Afghanistan, and Pakistan.

On April 4, 2016, it was announced that the 65th Brigade is already in Syria to support the government in regards to the Syrian Civil War, where two have been reportedly killed in action against al-Nusra Front: Second Lieutenant Mohsen Ghitaslou and Second Lieutenant Mojtaba Yadollahi Monfared. Jerusalem Post, citing unofficial Syrian sources, reported that as of 13 April 2016 the unit has lost 30 soldiers during operations in Syria, but this is not confirmed.

In 2019, the American Defense Intelligence Agency described the 65th Airborne as the most elite unit in the Iranian Army Ground Force.

== Training ==
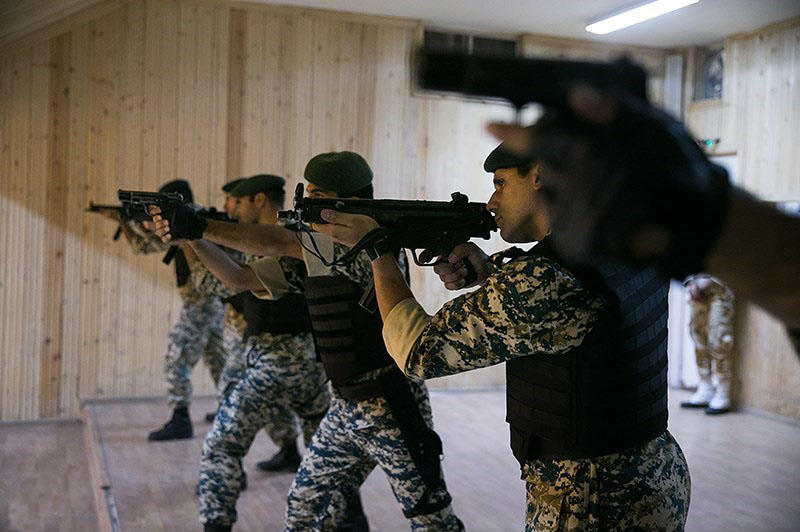
Members during training.

One of the training camps is located in jungles of Kelardasht, in which jungle warfare is trained during spring. The winter training camp is in Emamzadeh Hashem, in which there is a ski resort dedicated to the brigade, used for training snow warfare. The summer camp is located at Karaj Dam. Another camp is located in the desert of Qom, in which desert warfare is trained. The Hostage Rescue Unit, also known as Unit-110, is one of the units of the brigade, which has its own base in Mehrabad International Airport. According to the brigade commander Khosravi, the hostage rescue forces of the brigade are "our most elite forces". This unit cooperates with security organizations.

== Equipment and insignia ==
They are recognizable due to their use of safariflage DPM pattern camouflage. They wear a tactical vest and a green beret. The patch of the 65th is a dagger and golden wing superimposed over a green parachute with an Achaemenid-style shield on its background and is located on the left shoulder. The MPT-9S (Iranian-built collapsible stock variant of MP5) is their standard weapon, replacing the older Uzi. As of recent exercises, the standard of individual equipment has been greatly upgraded, with modern, MOLLE-type plate carriers and FAST-type helmets as well as modern small arms optics becoming increasingly common.

The CZ 75 pistol and AK-103 rifle as well as are also in use by the unit. Domestically produced AR-15–style assault rifles have also become common.

== In popular culture ==
The Crystal Simorgh-winning movie Kani-Manga (کانی مانگا), directed by Seyfollah Dad in 1987, and the movie Green Lions (شیران سبز) are both inspired by real world operations conducted by the 65th Brigade during the Iran–Iraq War.
