= Urbanism in Tehran =

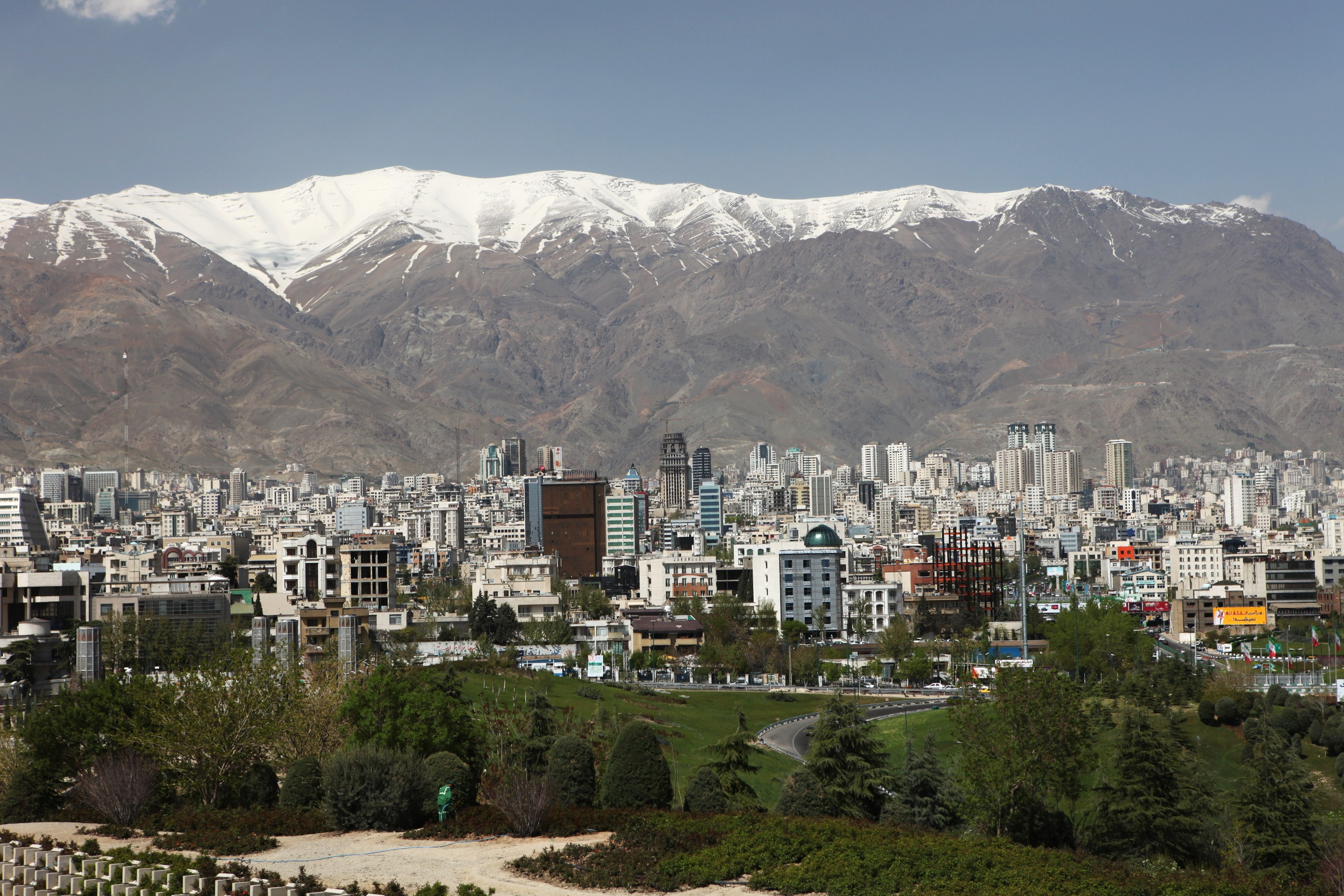
Tehran in winter, 2010

Modern urbanist ideas were first conceived and applied in Iran beginning in 1952. During the British boycott of Iranian oil of 1952, the Iranian government looked inward for income by investing in infrastructural and agricultural projects. It is during this period that the Bank Sakhtemani was established to create capital and funding for infrastructure projects throughout Iran, including urban development. In 1952, the Iranian parliament approved the purchase of lands outside the Tehran city limits by Sakhtemani Bank for development into towns. Bank Sakhtemani collaborated with The Association of Iranian Architect Diploma (AIAD) to prepare master plans for these projects. The first of these projects was Kuy-e-Narmak, TehranPars, and Nazi-Abad. The AIAD attempted to integrate ideas from modernist conferences such as the Union Internationale Des Architectes (UIA) and Congrès Internationaux D'architecture Modern (CIAM), with vernacular Persian architecture, hence practicing a vernacular modernism. Decades onward, these neighborhoods still maintain their underlying structure which organized them and makes them identifiable even though social and economic factors of the society have changed.

== Kuy-E-Narmak: City of the middle class ==
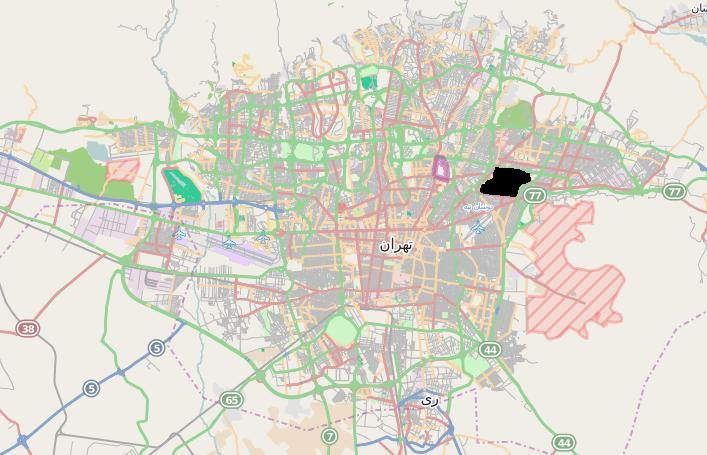
Narmak

Narmak (Persian: نارمک) is an urban neighborhood located in northeastern Tehran, the capital of Iran. Located in the 4th and 8th district of Tehran, the district consists of 110 distinctly sized squares with major nodes being Haft Hoz Square and Fadak Park. The project is designed by the AIAD and funded by Bank Sakhtemani from 1952 to 1958. It is home to more than 340,000 residents.

=== Design ===
Narmak was constructed on 506 hectares, in which 184, 225, and 97 hectares were allocated to the squares and streets, dwellings, and public amenities, respectively. The layout includes six main boulevards and their subsequent intersecting lanes. The grid forms 110 blocks in which all contain a public square in the center. Up to six east–west dead end alleys were driven from each square to subdivide the lots for development.

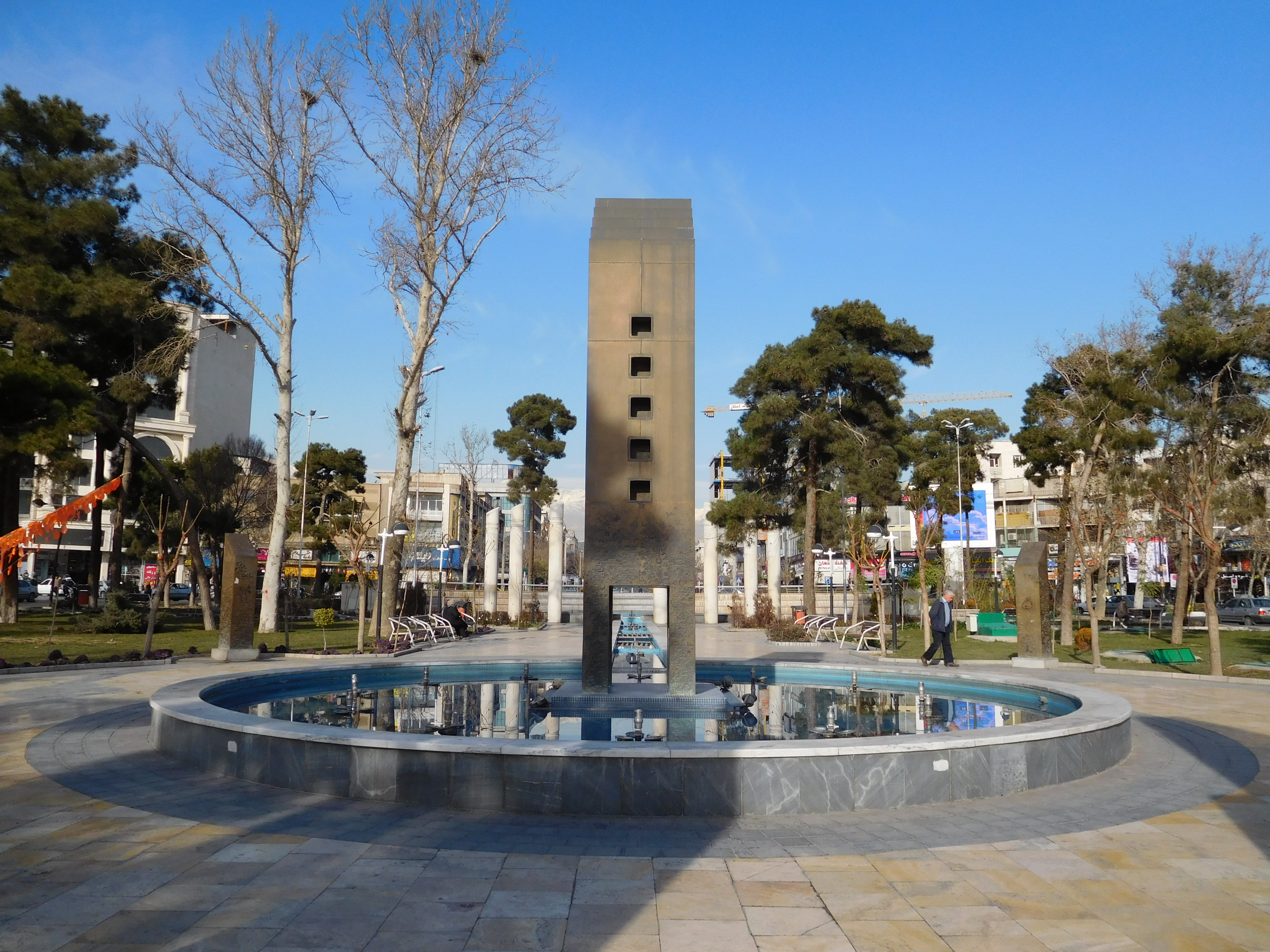
Haft Hoz Square in Narmak

In the intersection between the central north–south and west–east boulevards, a large plaza, Haft Hoz, was placed which is surrounded by administrative towers, municipal buildings, hospital, and commercial buildings. Along other main boulevards, a series of small public facilities were placed. A leisure zone, Fadak Park, was created to host public cultural facilities. Furthermore, a French prefabrication system, KALAD, was intended to be used for residential construction, but only 370 were built using local materials. Utilization of new construction methods and materials were a result of a desire by people to have high quality European style living. Even though low-cost housing projects were not desirable to many architects and developers of the time, the AIAD saw it as an opportunity to implement modern ideas.

In its approach to Narmak's planning, the AIAD was inspired by the philosophy of Le Corbusier set out in “The Functional City” and the Athens Charter of 1943. The charter explained the necessary town conditions of Dwellings, Recreation, Working, and Transportation, which highlighted the advantages of collective organization. To implement modernist principles and prior to planning for the new district, AIAD visited Chandigarh for inspiration. Chandigarh represented what they were aiming for, a successful application of modernist principles on a newly developed town.

=== Persian Modernism ===
The architects of Narmak aspired to apply Persian vernacular architecture to modern principles to create familiarity for the residents. First, the architects applied the idea of the Chaharbagh of Esfehan to the streets of Narmak. Secondly, the architects placed a Meydan in the center of each block; A garden which creates a place of joy, happiness, encounter, and familiarity for the residents. Finally, the individual houses, typically a one-story detached houses of three typologies, were surrounded by two-meter-high (6.6 ft) walls to form a hayat, or courtyard, typical of local architecture.

For faster construction, the architects erected buildings with a mix of load-bearing brick walls and steel skeleton to show locals that it would be possible to build using local materials. Residents had the option of either ordering from Bank Sakhtemani or building their own homes with technical supervision by the bank. The majority chose the second option, which led to “the heterogeneity and polarity of modern experiences and the sense of place” described by Umbach and Huppauf. The localization and adaptation in individual houses, based on local materials and market force, integrated traditional crafts and migrant labor capacities.

=== Resiliency ===
By providing mortgages for the construction of new houses, Bank Sakhtemani was able to self-organize and support the project independent of external investments. The neighborhood was planned over a 7-month period with no government support. Subsequently, the plot owners were able to realize their homes by dividing their land into two or three parcels and selling all but one. This was made possible by the private ownership law of 1906, during the Iranian Constitutional Revolution. The law allowed for people to organize, control, adapt, and change their living environment by themselves, reinforcing the self-organization concept of the Narmak project. This all made it possible for the residents to add character to their residence and create a sense of place. Unlike most developments up into that point in Iran which were segregated zones, Narmak contained a variety of people from different backgrounds. The land-ownership that was set up and maintained throughout the years has created a particularly resilient neighborhood identity.

== Tehran Pars: City of the upper middle class ==
TehranPars (Persian: تهران‌پارس) is an urban neighborhood located in the 4th and 8th districts of northeastern Tehran. The district consists of 4 main squares and bordered on the west by Narmak. The project was funded by Bank Sakhtemani from 1958 to 1972 and designed by AIAD.

TehranPars was primarily funded by the Zoroastrian community. Its construction was in response to the continued growth of the population of Tehran. Although remaining a successful neighborhood, it lacked the necessary infrastructure to be a self-sustaining city. TehranPars lacks the sense of place present in Narmak, through the absence of iconic institutions such as, theatres and museums.

== Nazi Abad: City of industrial class ==
Nazi Abad is an urban neighborhood located in southern Tehran. Located in the 16th district of the city, the district is less wealthy than Narmak or TehranPars but remains one of the best places to reside in the city. The project was funded by Bank Sakhtemani from 1952 to 1954 and designed by AIAD. During World War 2, it was meant to house workers from Germany.

Nazi Abad existed prior to investment and construction by Bank Sakhtemani and AIAD being founded by the Qajar aristocracy prior to the 20th century, hence the origins of its name. During the modernization of Iran, development was focused around creating a district attractive to industrial workers. Today it consists of low to working class housing, a university, industrial zones, and a large green space to the northwest. It is based on a looser grid than the other two districts.
