= Squatting in Kazakhstan =

Occupation of unused land or derelict buildings in Kazakhstan

Kazakhstan on globe

Under the 1977 Constitution of the Soviet Union, housing was guaranteed for every citizen and after Kazakhstan became a republic, a new housing code was established in 1992. From the 1980s onwards, many Kazakhs migrated to the largest city Almaty and squatted in shanty towns. In the 1990s, the Alma-Ata Union of the Homeless recommended to squatters that they should occupy unused land, summer homes or derelict buildings. When the authorities attempted to evict an informal settlement called Shanyrak in the mid-2000s there was a riot in which one police officer died; the poet Aron Atabek, who was chairman of Shanyrak's Land and Dwelling Committee, was arrested and imprisoned for 18 years. By 2016, estimates put the population of Shanyrak at 160,000 officially and at 220,000 when unregistered people were included.

== History ==
Under the 1977 Constitution of the Soviet Union, housing was guaranteed for every citizen, with internal migration controlled by the need for a propiska (permit) to live and work somewhere. When Kazakhstan became a republic in its own right in 1991, the ethnic Kazakhs were under 40 per cent of the total population and the right to housing became a political issue for nationalists. A new housing code was established in 1992.

By the 1980s, many people had a propiska to live in Almaty (then Alma-Ata), Kazakhstan's largest city and the capital at the time, but had not been allocated an apartment. In 1987, 500,000 people were waiting for apartments nationwide and 20,000 in Almaty. Therefore the Zhiloy-91 housebuilding program was announced and self-building was also encouraged. Two years later, activists founded the organization Asar (meaning "co-operation" in the Kazakh language), which squatted derelict apartments and also demanded homes for ethnic Kazakhs. The procedure to buy land and construct a dwelling legally is time-consuming, so people often build their home first then attempt to legalise it later. Corruption (known as blat) is rife amongst the officials who distribute titles. In 2021, the authorities announced that satellite observation had determined there were 400,000 squats across the country and corrupt officials were blamed for selling off land illegally and producing false documents.

== Shanyrak ==
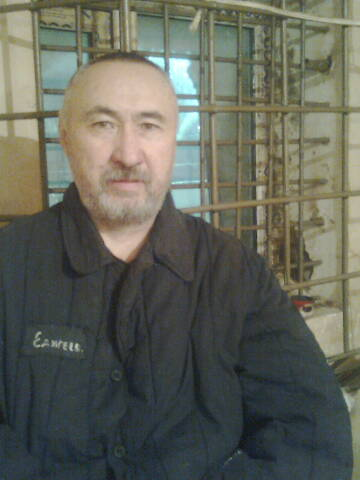
Aron Atabek in prison, 2012

In the 1990s, the Alma-Ata Union of the Homeless recommended to squatters that they should occupy unused land, summer homes or derelict buildings, and around 28 sites were occupied. When Kazakhstan grew wealthy through oil sales, the Almaty administration announced development schemes and planned to demolish shanty towns where people were living without running water in order to build luxury housing. The authorities began to evict squatters in Bakay and Shanyrak in 2006, although 80 per cent of residents had been issued with legal titles to their land. The poet Aron Atabek, who was chairman of Shanyrak's Land and Dwelling Committee, wrote to the wife of the president saying "Why not show some humanity and philanthropy, and legalise these miserable 0.06-hectare plots for these Kazak families for whom these pieces of land are the only way to survive in an environment of unchecked capitalism?".

In July, hundreds of people were evicted from their shacks in Bakay and a week later the police came to Shanyrak. Knowing that the threat of eviction was imminent, 1,500 residents decided to resist and in the ensuing conflict, four policemen were taken hostage. Three were released and the other was covered in petrol and set alight, later dying of his injuries. Order was only restored when 600 more police arrived and the following year, 23 men were sentenced for their participation in the riot. The 23 included Aron Atabek, who was jailed for 18 years. Whilst in prison, he wrote a book criticising President Nursultan Nazarbayev and his administration called The Heart of Eurasia which was smuggled out and published in 2012. In consequence, Atabek was placed in solitary confinement, leading to protests from writers' association PEN International. Atabek would continue on serving his prison sentence before being released in October 2021; shortly afterwards he was hospitalised and died from COVID-19.

Nazarbayev decreed the legalisation of the homes, yet by 2010 this had not happened. The same year, seventy squatters from Shanyrak attempted to storm a council meeting concerning the legalisation of land claims. A new program was established in 2012, called Affordable Housing 2020, which then became embroiled in scandals involving shoddy construction and nepotism. By 2016, estimates put the population of Shanyrak at 160,000 officially and at 220,000 when unregistered people were included.
