= Alash National Freedom Party =

Unregistered political party in Kazakhstan

Alash National Freedom Party Алаш ұлттық бостандық партиясы
- Chairman: Vacant
- Founder: Aron Atabek
- Founded: April 1990
- Membership (2000): 30,000
- Ideology: Pan-Turkism; Islamism; Anti-communism
- Religion: Islam
- Slogan: "Turkism is our body, Islam is our spirit", "Alash!", "Tengri-Teg!"

Party flag

The Alash National Freedom Party (Kazakh: Алаш ұлттық бостандық партиясы, romanized: Alaş ūlttyq bostandyq partiasy) or simply Alash is an unregistered political party in Kazakhstan, stated as national patriotic party. The Alash party was founded in April 1990, led by dissident and formerly imprisoned poet Aron Atabek. The party derives its name from Alash (1917–1920) which was a constitutional democratic party that was responsible in formation of the Alash Autonomy. Since 1991, the Alash party declared the freedom of enterprise, freedom of religion and equality of nations. The party was registered on 26 December 1992. After holding its congress, the Alash party was renamed to Alash National Party on 29 May 1999. The party was re-registered on 11 August 1999 and participated in the 1999 Kazakh legislative election, winning no seats.

Following a decree from 15 July 2002 on political parties, the Alash party applied for re-registration process and operated under the name of Alash Kazakhstan Party due to law which forbids the use of the word "national". The request was rejected on 5 April 2003 by the Ministry of Justice due to not having the required minimum number of 50,000 members which the Alash party claimed to have.

It has published its own newspaper under the slogan "Turkism is our body, Islam is our spirit".
