= Squatting in Iraq =

In Iraq, people squat both buildings and land. The Iraq War lasted from 2003 until 2011; following the 2003 invasion of Iraq, rent controls were dismantled and many people were evicted and began to squat, illegally connecting to electricity and sanitation. Buildings such as the Baghdad Stock Exchange were occupied and by 2005, thousands of people were living in a bombed-out airbase. During the Iraqi civil war (2006–2008), sectarian tensions between Shiite and Sunni Muslims led to more displacement of people and consequent squatting, which the government said it would not tolerate.

In 2010, the UNHCR stated there were 260,000 squatters in Baghdad (up by 100,000 from the previous year), and estimated there were at least 400,000 to 500,000 across the country. Squatters had settled on former military installations, such as the al-Rasheed camp and on the periphery of cities. The Ministry of Displacement and Migration gave statistics indicating that in 2008 there were 3,099 homes belonging to people displaced by conflict which were occupied by squatters. The ministry aimed to encourage squatters to move out with a cash incentive of 1.8 million Iraqi dinars (US$ 1,525) so that the original owners could move back in, but by 2010, only one squatter had successfully taken up the offer. The UNHCR's Iraq representative commented in 2021 that "the squatter camps are the biggest humanitarian problem facing Iraq".

== See also ==
- Squatting in Iran
