= Afsariyeh =

Neighbourhood in Tehran, Iran

Coordinates: 34°24′N 48°41′E

Afsariyeh (Persian: افسریه) is a neighborhood in the south-east of Tehran in Iran. In 1977, the state ordered the eviction of squatted shanty towns in Afsariyeh.
