= Squatting in Malaysia =

Malaysia on globe

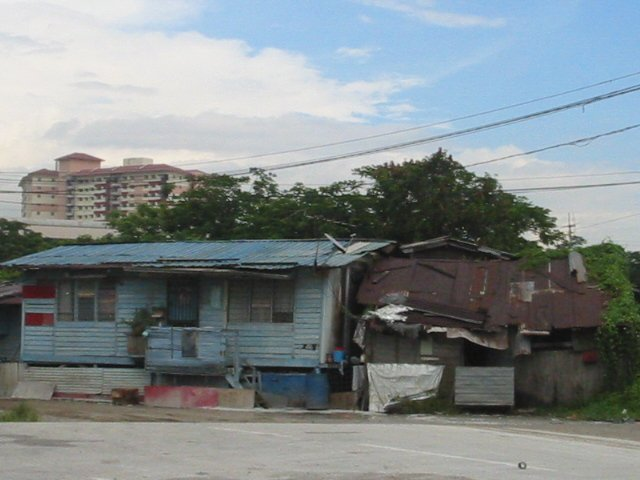
Shanty housing in Kuala Lumpur, 2006

Squatting in Malaysia is the occupation of unused or derelict buildings or land without the permission of the owner. Squatting began after World War II and is governed by various laws. Recently, the government has announced its intention to house squatters in affordable housing.

== History ==
Before World War II, there was not much squatting in Malaysia. Squatting by displaced people increased during the Japanese occupation between 1941 and 1945. Whilst fighting for independence from the British Empire, the Malayan National Liberation Army (MNLA) found support amongst the 500,000 Chinese squatters living on the edge of the jungle. To counter the threat, the squatters were forcibly resettled into camps. After the Malayan Declaration of Independence in 1957, squatting in Malaysia increased as the country industrialised and many people moved from the countryside to the capital Kuala Lumpur. Squatters occupied government land and infill sites such as railway cuttings and swampy land. By the 1970s, estimates of the number of squatters in Kuala Lumpur ranged from 175,000 to 225,000 people. In 1973, 80% had no electricity, 75% no running water and 35% no sewerage.

== Legality ==
The National Land Code 1965 (Section 425) defined squatting as occupation of land without permission from the appropriate authorities. The Essential (Clearance of Squatters) Regulations 1969 stated that any construction on land without permission from the appropriate authorities can be considered squatting. In 1974, this was adapted to also cover land. An important case was Sidek bin Haji Mohamad & 461 Ors v The Government of Malaysia (1982, 1 MLJ 313), which confirmed squatters have no right in law. Occupation of state-owned land is a crime punishable by a fine of up to RM10,000 or 1 year in prison, or both. Adverse possession is not recognised in Malaysia.

Order 89 of the Rules of Court 2012 allows owners to claim possession of property occupied by squatters, to be implemented by a writ of possession. When this law applies has been challenged by cases such as the Court of Appeal case of Tekad Urus Sdn v Penduduk-penduduk yang Menduduki Kawasan yang dipanggil Desa Perwira (2004, 2 CLJ 516).

== Recent events ==
Federal Territories Minister Khalid Abdul Samad declared in 2019 that the government intended to house squatters in affordable housing. During the COVID-19 pandemic in Malaysia, people from Palau squatted at Kampung Sembulan Tengah.
