= Aron Atabek =

Kazakh poet, journalist, and politician (1953–2021)

- Арон Атабек
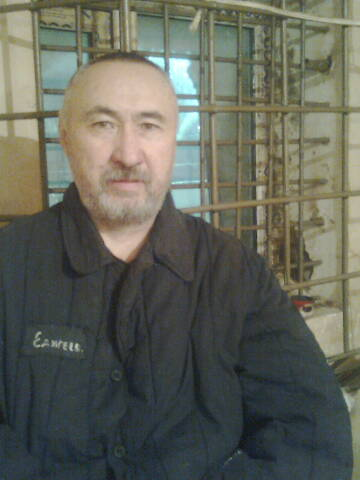
- Atabek in prison, 2012

Leader of the Alash National Freedom Party
- In office April 1990 – 24 November 2021
- Preceded by: Office established
- Succeeded by: Vacant

Personal details
- Born: Aron Qabyşūly Nutuşev; 31 January 1953 Naryn Khuduk, Kalmyk ASSR, Russian SFSR, Soviet Union
- Died: 24 November 2021 (aged 68) Almaty, Kazakhstan
- Party: Alash
- Children: Alma Nutusheva
- Education: Kazakh State University; Leningrad State University
- Profession: Poet, author, journalist, political activist

Military service
- Battles/wars: First Nagorno-Karabakh war Jeltoqsan revolt

Aron Qabyşūly Edigeev (Kazakh: Арон Қабышұлы Едігеев, Нутушев, born Aron Qabyşūly Nutuşev; 31 January 1953 – 24 November 2021), better known as Aron Atabek (Kazakh: Арон Атабек), was a Kazakh political activist and poet.

He was a leader of an independent Alash National Freedom Party, and the president of the political council of the Kazak Memleketi, the Kazakhstan National Front. After Kazakhstan gained its independence in 1991 upon the dissolution of the Soviet Union, he was a staunch critic of the regime of President Nursultan Nazarbayev. He was an author of several poems and a book critical of the Kazakh government, for which he was imprisoned for fifteen years. He was released in October 2021, and died a month later on 24 November, while being treated in a hospital in Almaty for COVID-19.

== Early life and education ==
Atabek was born on 31 January 1953, with a birth name Aron Qabyşūly Nūtuşev, in the village Naryn Khuduk in the Kalmyk Autonomous Soviet Socialist Republic (now Kalmykia, Russia). His father lived during the Holodomor famine, and spent years in a Gulag camp before eventually becoming the chairman of a collective farm in the Astrakhan Oblast. Atabek's grandfather and great-grandfather were repressed and executed by the Bolsheviks. His great-great-grandfather Makhambet Otemisuly was a poet and warrior who led an uprising in Bukey Horde in 1836–1837, but was later killed by Kazakh mercenaries under the order of the Russian Tsarist authorities.

In 1971, Atabek moved to the Kazakh Soviet Socialist Republic (now Kazakhstan) when he was 18 years old. There, he graduated from the Faculty of Philology in the Kazakh State University in 1974. He subsequently underwent an internship in the Department of Mongolian Studies and Turkology at Leningrad State University, and then worked as an editor in the State Film Agency and Mektep Publishing House.

== Political activism ==
Because Kazakhstan was still a part of the Soviet Union, Atabek opposed the Communist Party of the Soviet Union (CPSU). In 1986, he participated in the Jeltoqsan civil unrest that took place in Alma-Ata (present-day Almaty), and consequently hid in remote areas to avoid prosecution. In April 1989, Atabek wrote a letter to the Congress of People's Deputies of the Soviet Union demanding "a revision of the political assessment in regards to Jeltoqsan and the release of all its protesters, as well as granting of Kazakhstan's state sovereignty".

In August 1989, Atabek organized Kazakhstan's first ever Zheruyuk National Patriotic Society. Months later in November 1989, he personally submitted an application to the Alma-Ata City Executive Committee in a request to allow a trizna feast in memory of the victims of the Jeltoqsan. As a result, Atabek faced persecution and was imprisoned, and the Zheruyuk Society was abolished. In spite of this, with the approval of the Ideology Secretary Özbekälı Jänıbekov, mourning rallies were held in Alma-Ata on 13 December 1989 at the medical institute and continued until January 1990 to commemorate the third anniversary of the Jeltoqsan. In December 1989, Atabek met with First Secretary of the Communist Party of Kazakhstan Nursultan Nazarbayev to voice demands that were written prior in a letter to Congress of People's Deputies.

By April 1990, Atabek announced the formation of a nationalist pan-Turkist Islamic Alash National Freedom Party, and he became leader. Apart from calling for Kazakhstan's independence and the establishment of a unified Islamic Turkestan which would expel all Slavs, the party criticized the existing government, specifically Nazarbayev. As a result, Atabek was threatened and forced to move to Moscow in February 1991. In December 1991, the pro-Islamic faction of the Alash attempted to forcefully remove mufti (Muslim jurist) Ryspek Nysambaev from a mosque in Alma-Ata; Nysambaev was attacked and taken hostage before being freed by police. In response, Atabek condemned the incident caused by the party members, accusing the KGB and Islamic fundamentalists of setting up the provocative attack. However, he attempted to achieve the release of his party members from prison using personal connections and financial capabilities. Due to the events, the Kazakh government accused Atabek of staging the incident and slandering Nazarbayev, violating Kazakh criminal code. As a result, a criminal case was opened against him, and Russian security forces arrested him in Moscow in March 1992.

== Life in exile (1992–1996) ==
Atabek's case gained publicity as attempts were made to send him back to Kazakhstan. With the help of lawyers, the Russian government offered Atabek assistance in obtaining political asylum abroad from numerous countries. After receiving an invitation from the Azerbaijani President Abulfaz Elchibey in April 1992, Atabek moved to Baku on 6 August 1992. Atabek described Azerbaijan as a "compromise option" and remarked the "Caspian Sea does not divide, but connects Kazakhstan and Azerbaijan." There, he lived with family and close friends, prompting the involvement of the Kazakh Ministry of Foreign Affairs to negotiate with the Azerbaijani government. Ultimately, the Kazakh government pledged not to demand an extradition of Atabek, while in return, Azerbaijan would only provide security, rather than granting a political asylum. During his stay in the country, Atabek wrote that he had been living in the barracks along with the refugees from the First Nagorno-Karabakh War and was not provided with housing, job, financial assistance, or Azerbaijani citizenship, relying on the generosity of close friends affiliated with the Azerbaijani Popular Front Party for food. Atabek defended Azerbaijan in the First Nagorno-Karabakh War and became one of founders of the Turkestan Committee, an opposition group consisting of emigrants from the Turkic-speaking countries in Central Asia, taking trips to Karabakh and Chechnya, as well as participating in the 1st World Kurultai of Turkic Peoples held in Antalya.

After Heydar Aliyev came to power in Azerbaijan, Atabek left the country and moved with his family to Nalchik, Russia, where according to himself they lived in a "very poor state", before moving back to Moscow in October 1994. From Moscow his family returned to Almaty, while Atabek stayed in Russia, although visiting Kazakhstan several times illegally before moving there in December 1996.

== Return to Kazakhstan and subsequent activities (1996–2006) ==
Upon returning to Kazakhstan, Atabek described being "unaffectionately greeted" by his homeland. During that time, Atabek was homeless: he had sold his two apartments earlier to financially support the Alash party and was unemployed. Atabek was denied Kazakhstani citizenship and instead he demanded a pardon from President Nursultan Nazarbayev, which was refused. He resided in rented apartments and dachas and lived in the mountains for two years while renting a cottage with his family. Atabek's son, Asqar, started school late while his daughter Aidana was homeschooled.

From 2003 to 2005, Atabek worked as an editor in the literary magazine Amanat at the International Club of Poetry Lovers of Abai. While there, he entered politics again by becoming the organizer and chairman of the Kazak Ulty Society. In April 2005, Atabek formed the Kazak Memleketi (People's Front of Kazakhstan), an organization aimed at uniting all Kazakh people as well as other ethnic groups living in the country. The Kazak Memleketi also advocated for the protection of the rights of homeless people living in self-constructed illegally erected homes which created a movement of "collective self-defense" for shanty towns located in the microdistricts within Almaty, as well as for residents living in dormitories facing eviction.

== Involvement in Shanyrak riot and trial ==
Starting in May 2006, the Almaty city government began demolishing shanty towns located within the city outskirts due to a new housing development program to accommodate the city's growing population, without providing resettlement assistance for the residents nor an appropriate registration process. Atabek participated in the defense of homes in Bakai District against demolition, while calling on others to join in these efforts, writing to First Lady of Kazakhstan Sara Nazarbayeva: "Why not show some humanity and philanthropy, and legalise these miserable 0.06-hectare plots for these Kazakh families for whom these pieces of land are the only way to survive in an environment of unchecked capitalism?" During the event, Atabek's knee was injured after an officer hit him with a truncheon. Despite the efforts by city authorities, the homes were briefly prevented from being demolished until 7 July 2006, when 500 houses were razed and their residents evicted.

Portions of the Shanyrak District were also targeted for demolition. When the town's residents became aware of the city's eviction plans, they built defensive barricades, prepared Molotov cocktails, and collected sticks and stones, with Bakai residents also joining forces in Shanyrak. On 14 July 2006, skirmishes broke out in Shanyrak after a riot squad arrived to clear out the area. Both sides suffered injuries, including one police officer set on fire with gasoline. Multiple squadron assaults were carried out in an attempt to take control of the area, but resisting locals repelled police until the city authorities called off the siege, thus preventing further enactment of evictions and demolition of homes.

Atabek, who headed the Shanyrak's Land and Dwelling Committee advocacy group at that time, sought medical care after being injured in the riot and was attacked by six policemen while staying in hospital; he was interrogated by the Almaty Department of Internal Affairs before his release at one o'clock in the morning. After Atabek's injuries, he and his friends sought medical help but were repeatedly denied by several hospitals. Atabek was once again summoned to the Department of Internal Affairs on 17 July 2006, and was arrested on the charges of organizing the riot, taking hostages, and attempted murder, the latter of which was changed to a murder charge shortly afterwards when the burned policeman died.

== Imprisonment ==
Following his involvement in the protests against the shanty town demolition, Atabek was sentenced to a prison term of eighteen years for organizing politically motivated proceedings during a protest against the demolition of a shanty town in 2006. He was also convicted of the death of the police officer who was burned.

In 2012, Atabek published the book The Heart of Eurasia criticizing Nursultan Nazarbayev's regime. The work was published after being smuggled out of the facility where he was imprisoned. Subsequently, he was sentenced to two years in solitary confinement and transferred to jail in Arkalyk, described as one of the harshest prisons in Kazakhstan. After fifteen years in prison, he was released in October 2021 due to deteriorating health.

=== Detention conditions ===
In 2009, it was reported that Atabek has been transferred to the prison in Arkalyk in the Kostanay Region. Atabek has described the conditions of his isolation as "a prison within a prison" or "a complete vacuum". The reportedly prolonged times of isolation constituted an inhuman act which according to the Treaty on International Covenant on Civil and Political Rights of the United Nations are prohibited, as Kazakhstan is a signatory of the UN treaty and therefore obliged to comply with it. Furthermore, by reportedly denying him a regular correspondence and visits by his relatives, Kazakhstan also violated the UN Standard Minimum Rules for the Treatment of Prisoners (also known as the Mandela Rules).

== Literary and journalistic works ==
Between 1989 and 1992, Atabek was the publisher of the newspapers Alash and HAK, which were prohibited in Kazakhstan. The Alash from January 1990 was printed in Estonia and delivered by couriers to Kazakhstan where the security forces attempted to withdraw the publication.

In addition, he authored several books of poetry and prose inspired by Tengriist spirituality and established the monthly Haq (The Truth) in 1992. After returning to Kazakhstan from exile in 1996, Atabek published his poetry collection in 1998, where he translated Kul-Teguin Monument, an ancient Turkic poetic stele into Russian and Yollig-tegin. Monument to Kul-Teguin, which was published in 2000 and financially supported by his friends.

While in prison, he also published Heart of Eurasia, a 2012 book that was critical of Nursultan Nazarbayev.

== Personal life ==
Atabek was married to Jainagul Aidarhan and has two children. He died from COVID-19 while recovering at an Almaty hospital on 24 November 2021, amid the COVID-19 pandemic in Kazakhstan, just a month after being released from prison.

== Awards ==
- 2004: Almas Kylysh prize
- 2010: Freedom to Create: Imprisoned Artist prize
