= Squatting in Bangladesh =

Bangladesh on globe

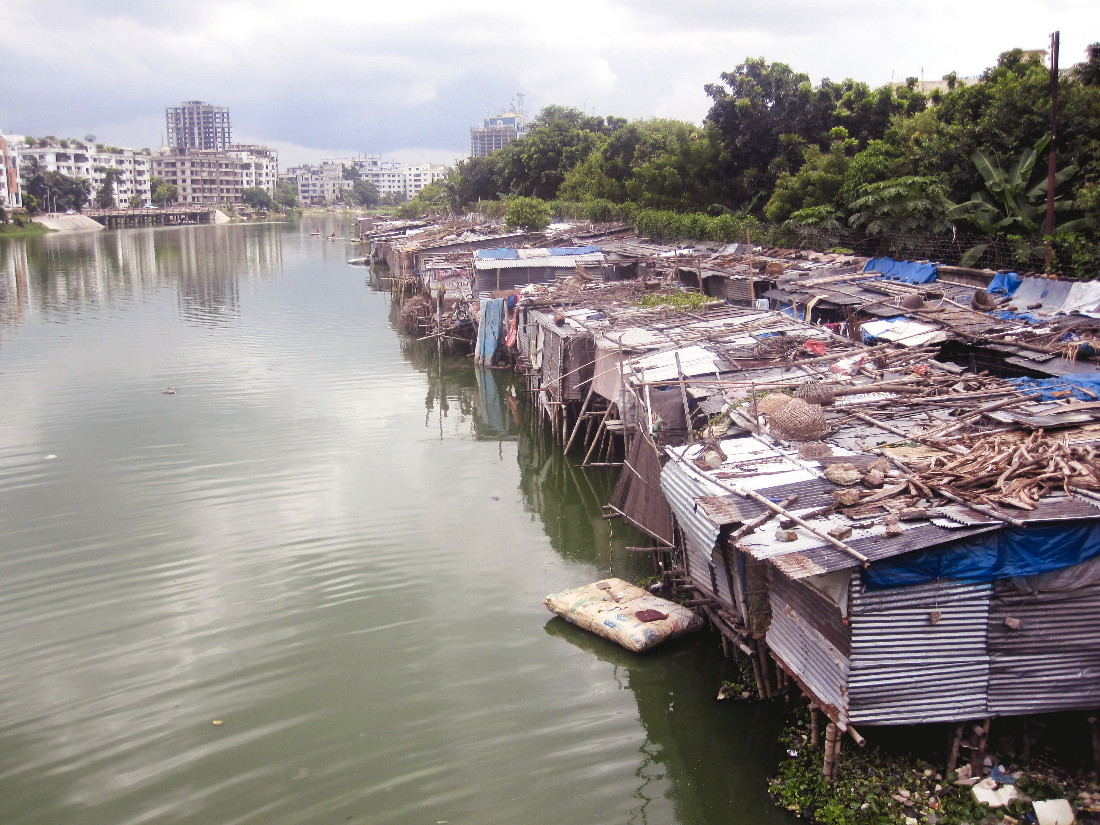
A floating shanty town in Dhaka, 2011

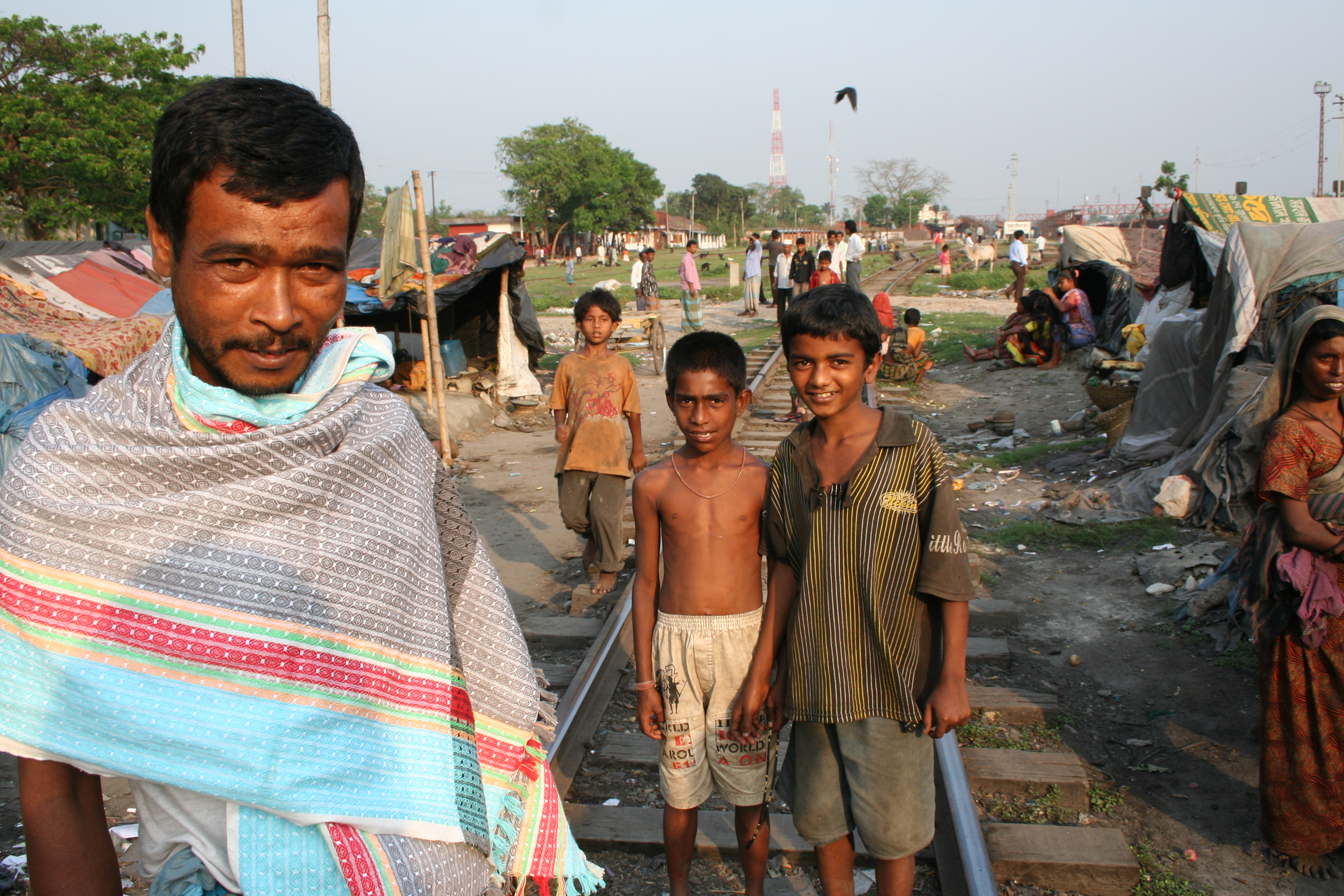
Shacks beside railway in Malgudam, Mymensingh Division, 2009

Squatting in Bangladesh occurs when squatters make informal settlements known as "bastees" on the periphery of cities such as Chittagong, Dhaka and Khulna. As of 2013, almost 35 per cent of Bangladesh's urban population lived in informal settlements.

== History ==
Squatting in the territory which would become Bangladesh has a long history, reaching back to the Mughal Empire. After the Partition of Bengal in 1947, Muslims migrated to what became East Pakistan. In contemporary times, squatting since the 1971 Bangladesh Liberation War has resulted from factors such as migration from rural areas to urban ones, the lack of affordable housing, bad governance and natural disasters. As well as informal settlements on the ground, there are rooftop slums and boat squatters. There are also rural squatters who make land grabs.

During the Bangladesh famine of 1974, flooding affected 80 per cent of the country and almost 100,000 people were displaced to 183 camps in Dhaka. After the flooding subsided, many refugees decided to live in informal settlements on the periphery of Dhaka rather than going home. These are known as "bastees". At the time this was the only available option since there was already a housing deficit of 47,195 units and little option to rent, except in the innercity slums. Thus ten per cent of Dhaka's population were squatters in 1974. The following year, the government began a forcible resettlement program which moved 200,000 squatters either back to their villages or into camps at Demra, Mirpur and Tongi. Whilst most resettled people stayed in the camps, this did not stop informal settlements growing in Dhaka.

In the early 1990s, the city of Chittagong had a population of just over 1.5 million, of which there were an estimated 66,676 squatters living in 69 areas. As of 2013, almost 35 per cent of Bangladesh's urban population lived in informal settlements. In Khulna, the largest squatted area was Supraghat, with 15,875 residents.
