= Tehranpars =

Neighborhood in Tehran

Tehranpars تهران‌پارس
- Neighborhood
- Location in Tehran Location in Iran
- Country: Iran
- Province: Tehran
- City: Tehran
- District: Districts 4 and 8
- Time zone: UTC+3:30 (IRST)

Tehranpars or Tehran Pars (Persian: تهران‌پارس) is an absorbed city inside the Greater Tehran Area, located in the north east area of the city. It is considered a neighbourhood of Tehran City and lies in Tehran's eastern flank inside the area of the 4th and 8th municipalities of Tehran. In 1977, squatted areas in Tehranpars were evicted on the order of the state.

== Gallery ==
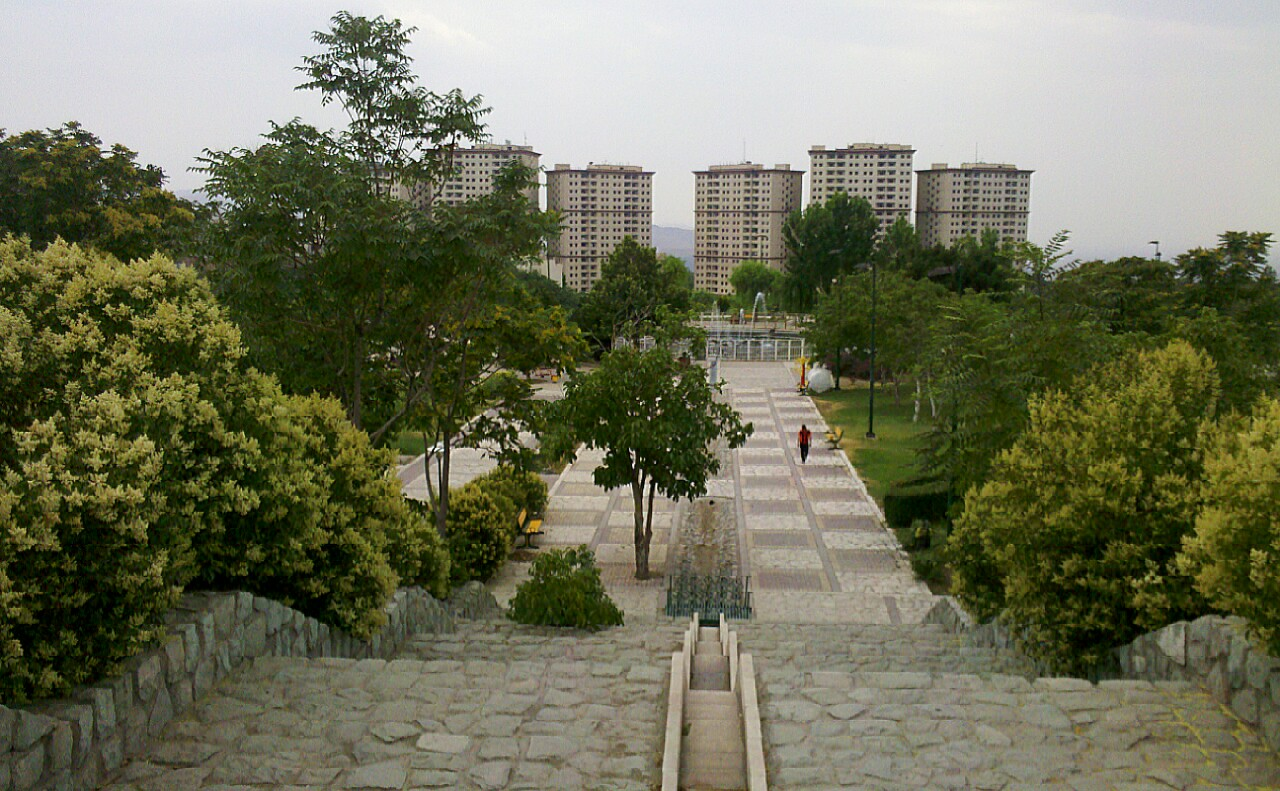
Police Park in Tehranpars

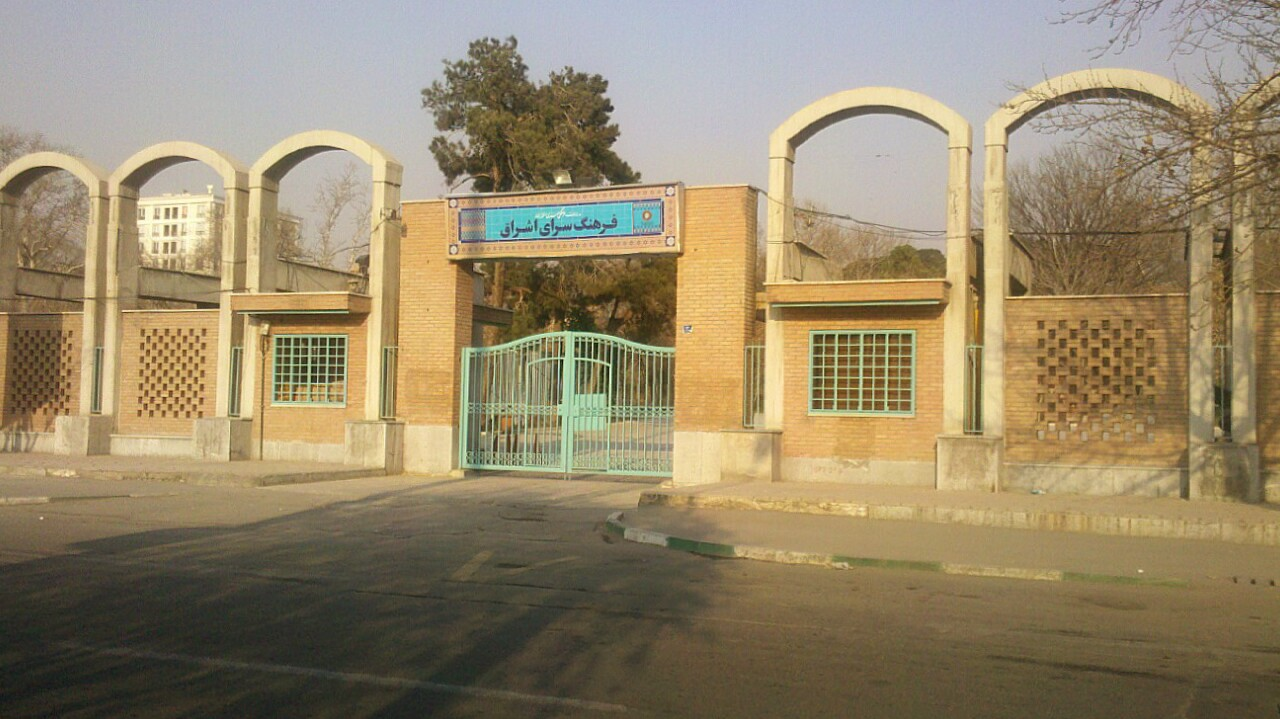
Eshragh cultural place in east of Tehranpars

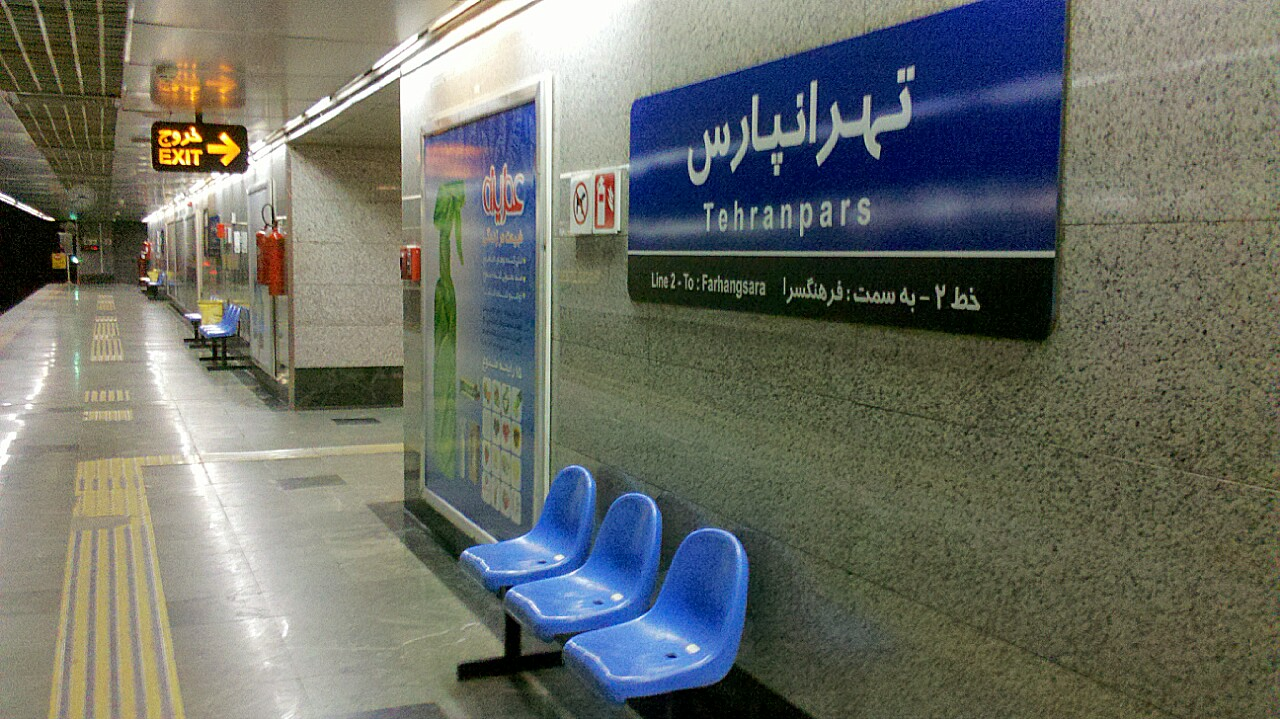
Tehranpars subway station

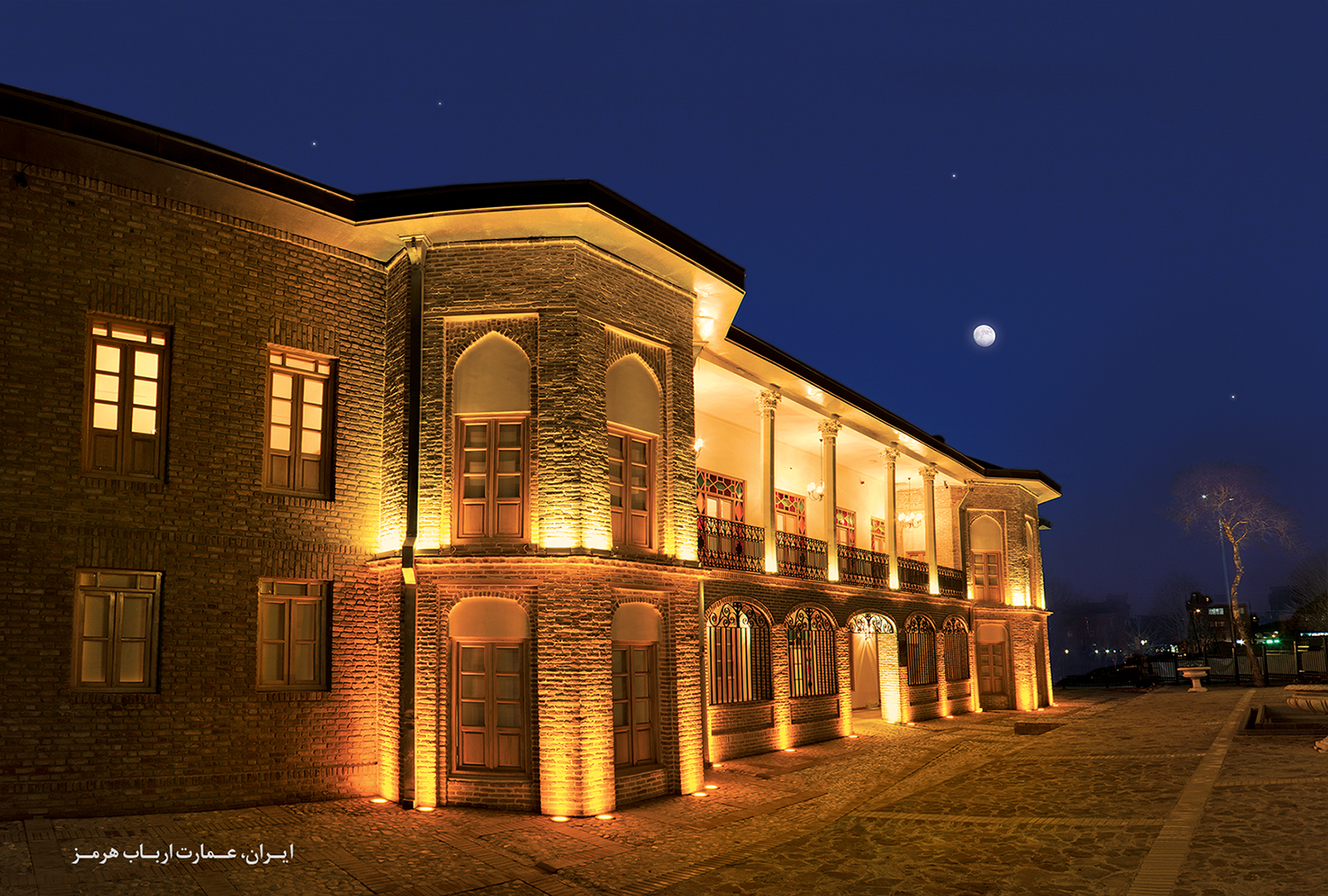
Arbab Hormoz Mansion

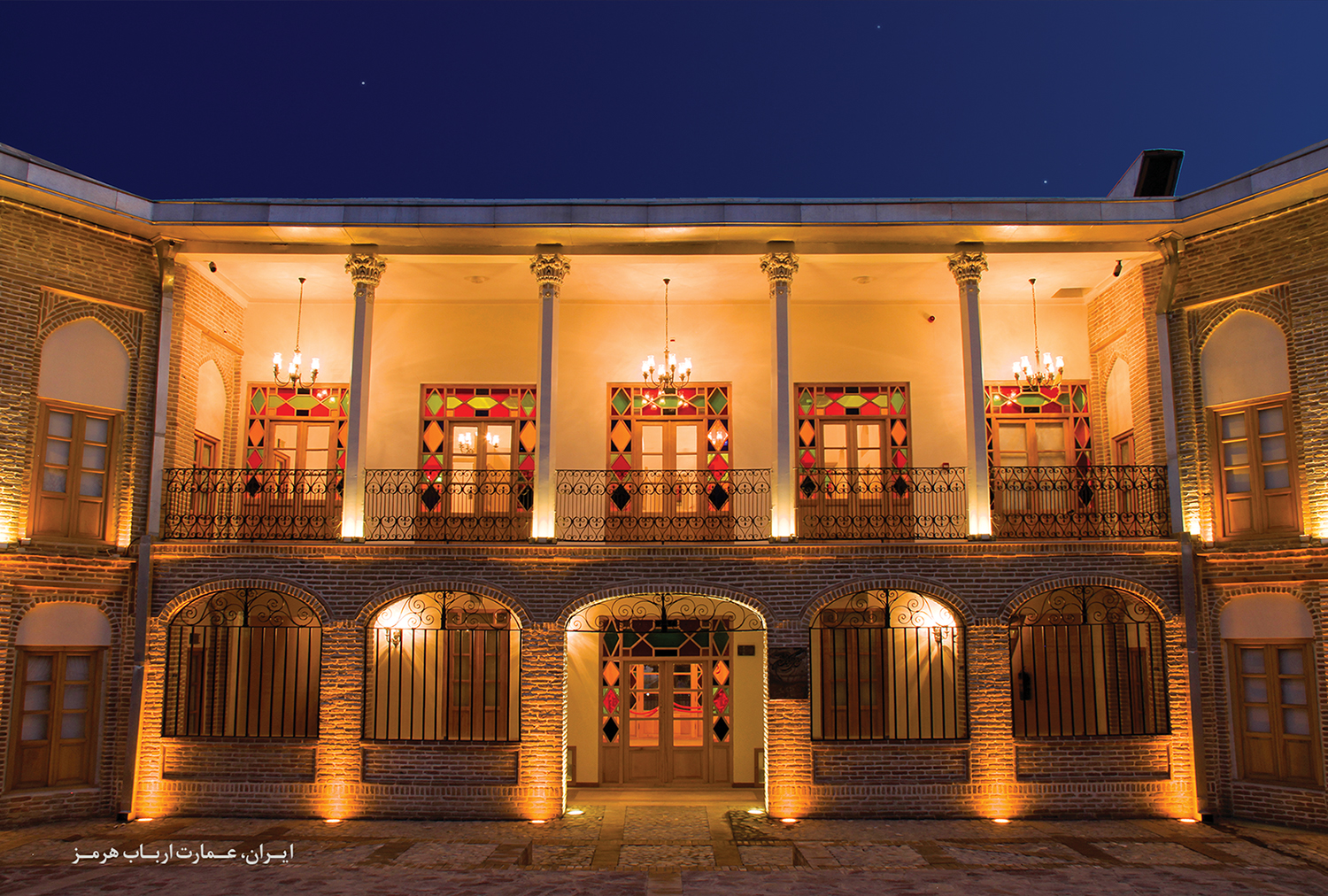
Arbab Hormoz Mansion

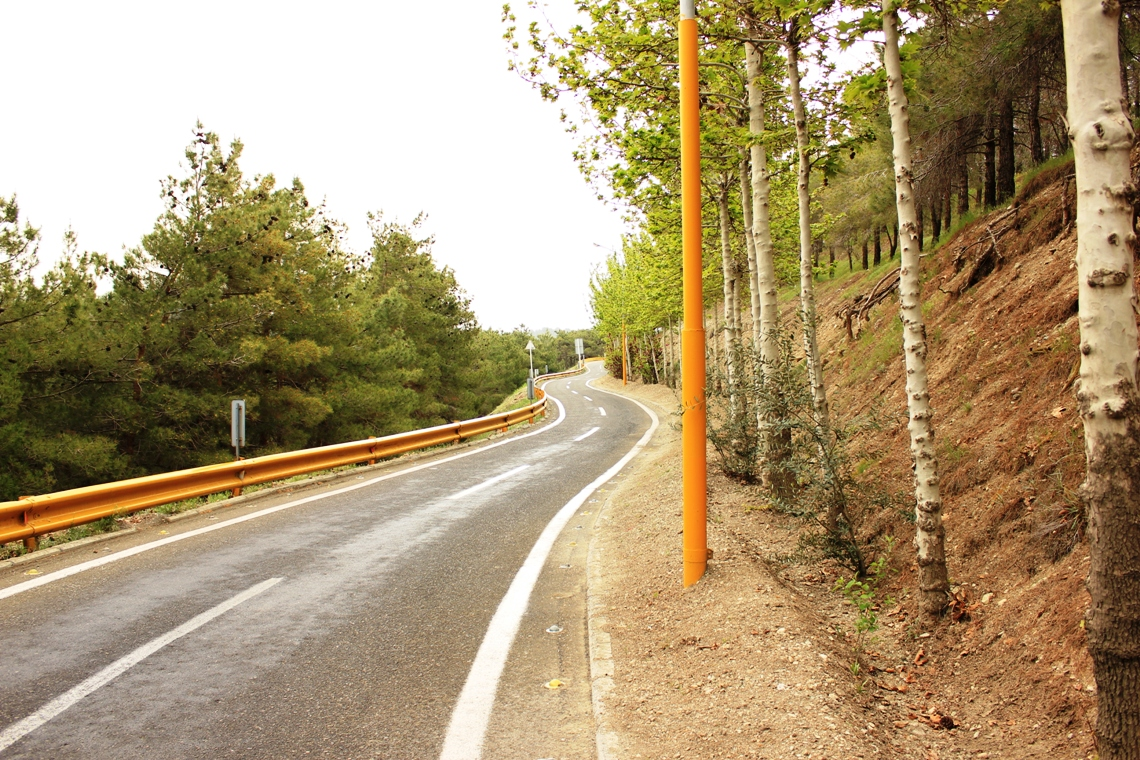
Lavizan Forest Park

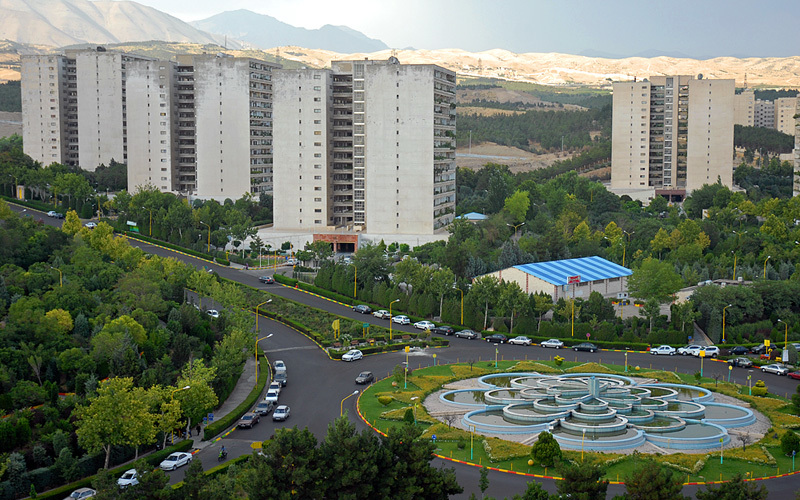
Town of Omid

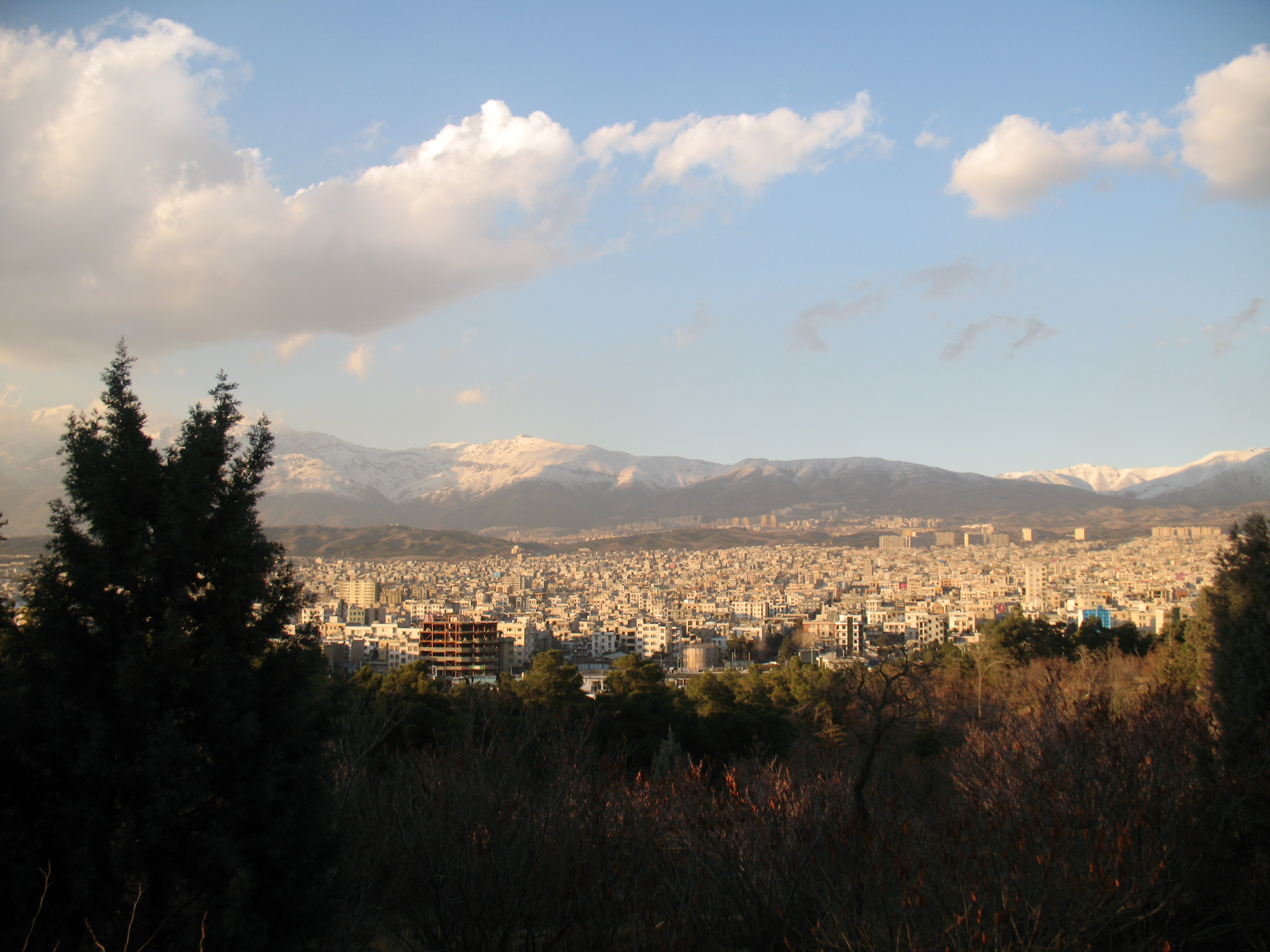
Perspective of Tehranpars from the hills of Sorkheh Hesar forest park
