= Squatting in Iran =

Iran on the globe

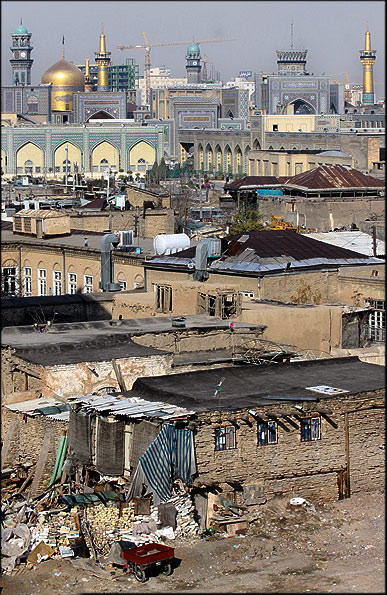
Informal settlement in Mashhad

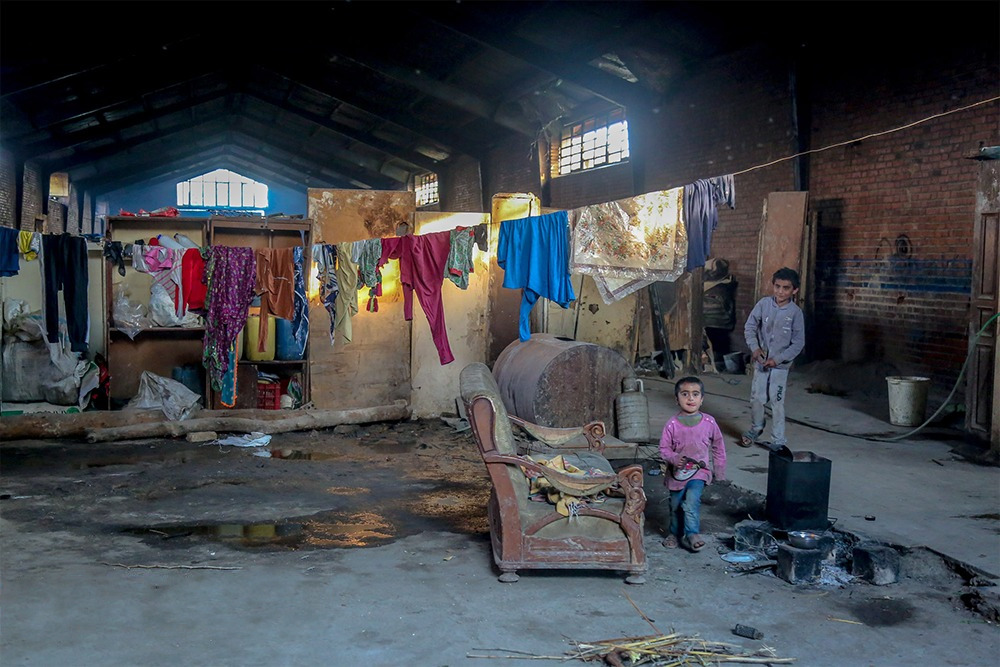
Squatters in Tehran

Squatting in Iran mostly occurs around the major cities, as rural migrants move to urban centres. From the 1950s onwards shanty towns have been set up and inhabitants are known as "koukhnishinan". Following the Iranian Revolution of 1979, squatter settlements increased, with the state sometimes evicting and sometimes legalizing the areas.

== History ==
Migrants from rural areas to Iran's major cities have set up informal settlements for decades. These shanty town dwellers are known as "koukhnishinan". In the 1950s and 1960s, squatters self-organised themselves into hey'ats (neighbourhood associations). They listened to recorded sermons from Ruhollah Khomeini in which he praised slum-dwellers as the real followers of Islam.

A 1972 survey of 481 squatted households in the capital Tehran reported that just over half of the men were unskilled workers. A minority of the squatters lived in caves hollowed out from the city's rubbish dumps. In 1977, there were serious clashes between police and squatters at evictions in places such as Afsariyeh, Mesgarabad, Narmak, Soleimanieh and Tehranpars. At Dowlatabad, thousands of migrants squatted beside the road from Tehran to Ray. During the revolution of 1979, people exploiting the chaos made land grabs and afterwards land squatting continued as well as the occupation of houses and hotels.

== Post-revolution ==
Khomeini led the revolution and became Grand Ayatollah of the Islamic Republic of Iran. In Tehran, hashiyenishini (squatter settlements) mushroomed, doubling in size in places such as Soleimanieh, Resalat Highway and Tajrish. Outside the city, squatters built homes out of mud and brick, their population increasing to almost half a million. Similar zones also developed around other cities such as Arak, Bakhtaran, Hamadan, Karadj, Mashhad, Tabriz and Shiraz. In Arak and Karadj, squatters campaigned to be supplied with running water.

Khomeini stated at "no one must remain without a dwelling in this country" and promised to ensure free electricity and water to all settlements. The Housing of the Dispossessed (Daftar-khanehsazi bara-ye mustazafin) began to confiscate buildings and land for distribution to the poor. The Revolutionary Guards often blocked these moves and a year later the office was closed. The state then nationalised land and pursued a policy of facilitating some occupations and evicting others. In 1985, an act was passed aiming to give land rights to peasants. They had one year to make their land productive, otherwise the state would take it over.

In the 1990s, evictions sparked rioting. One of the most serious riots took place in Mashhad at the end of May 1992, when the attempted demolition of the Kouy-e Tollab settlement led to severe disorder in which over 300 people were arrested. Six police officers died and four rioters were later hanged. There were also clashes in 2001.
