= Dupcheshwor Rural Municipality =

Dupcheshwor (RM) दुप्चेश्वर गाउँपालिका
- Rural Municipality
- Location Dupcheshwor (RM) (Nepal)
- Coordinates: 27°55′17″N 85°22′54″E
- Country: Nepal
- Province: Bagmati
- District: Nuwakot
- Wards: 7
- Established: 10 March 2017

Government
  - Type: Rural Council
  - President: Mr. Shankar Bahadur Thapa CPN (Maoist)
  - Vice-President: Mrs. Makuri Tamang CPN (Maoist)
  - Term of office: (2022 - 2026)

Area
  - Total: 131.62 km^{2} (50.82 sq mi)

Population (2011)
  - Total: 22,106
  - Density: 167.95/km^{2} (435.00/sq mi)
- Time zone: UTC+5:45 (Nepal Standard Time)
- Headquarter: Samundratar
- Website: dupcheshwormun.gov.np

Dupcheshwor is a Rural municipality located within the Nuwakot District of the Bagmati Province of Nepal. The municipality spans 131.62 square kilometres (50.82 sq mi) of area, with a total population of 22,106 according to a 2011 Nepal census.

On March 10, 2017, the Government of Nepal restructured the local level bodies into 753 new local level structures. The previous Ghyangphedi, Gaunkharka, Rautbesi, Beteni Balkumari, Samundratar and Shikharbesi VDCs were merged to form Dupcheshwor Rural Municipality. Dupcheshwor is divided into 7 wards, with Samundratar declared the administrative center of the rural municipality.

== Notable people ==
- Arjun Narasingha KC
- Kedar Narsingh KC
