= Gaunkharka =

Gaunkharka may refer to:

- Gaunkharka, Dhading, Nepal
- Gaunkharka, Nuwakot, Nepal
