= Balkumari =

Balkumari may refer to:

- Balkumari, Bhaktapur
- Balkumari, Nuwakot
- Balkumari temple
- Balkumari temple, Bhaktapur
