= Jes Air =

Bulgarian airline

JES Air ДЖЕС Еър

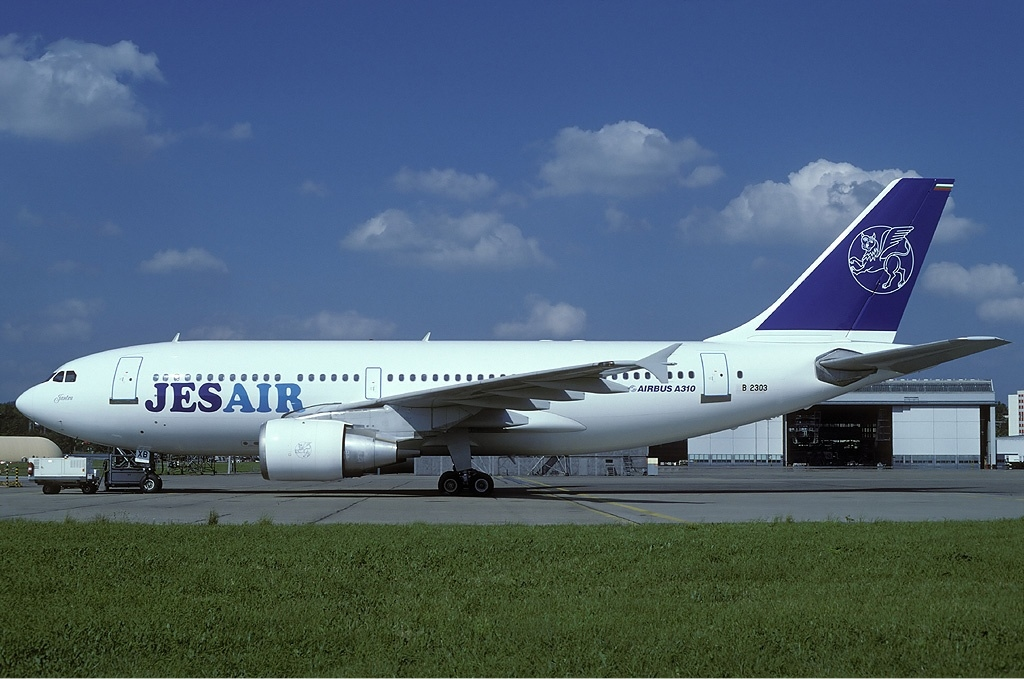
- Airbus A310 before delivery at Zurich Airport, Switzerland, in 1991
IATA	ICAO	Call sign
JX	JES	JES AIR
- Founded: 1991
- Ceased operations: 1992
- Hubs: Sofia Airport
- Focus cities: Tan Son Nhat Airport
- Fleet size: 3
- Destinations: 6
- Headquarters: Sofia, Bulgaria
- Key people: Milen Keremidchiev

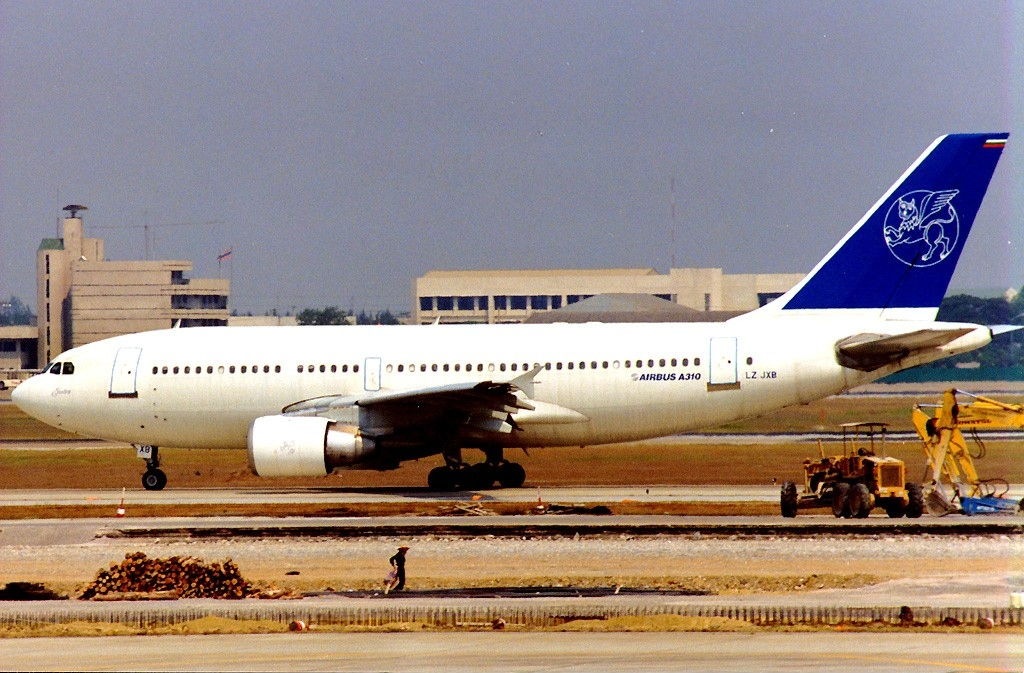
Airbus A310 at Bangkok International Airport, Thailand, in 1992.

Jes Air was established in 1991 and was one of the first privately owned airlines in Bulgaria. The airline was supported by investment capital of Singapore-based companies. At the beginning, flight operations were on an irregular basis. However some of those eventually became regular schedules. Jes Air became famous for delays, but remained popular due to its low fares.

== History ==
The first route for Jes Air was Sofia–New York City, after an agreement between the two nations. After this the air carrier expanded its routes towards Canada and Asia.

One of the aircraft - LZ-JXB was wet leased to Region Air Pte. LTtd, Singapore and was instrumental in the creation of the "new" Vietnam Airlines. Jes Air went bankrupt only one year after it started flights and at the end of 1992 was re-registered in the Middle East and renamed.

Following the bankruptcy, Region Air employed ex-JES Air pilots and engineers to continue with the development of Vietnam Airlines. The company's director, Milen Keremidchiev, from 2007 became Deputy Foreign Minister of Bulgaria. He is currently a member of the populist party There Is Such a People.

== Destinations ==
It operates long-haul flights to Southeast Asia, Australia, North America and Middle East from its respective hub in Sofia.

Australia

- Melbourne - Melbourne Airport

Bulgaria

- Sofia - Sofia Airport (hub)

Canada

- Ottawa - Macdonald–Cartier Airport

Singapore

- Singapore - Changi Airport

United Arab Emirates

- Dubai - Dubai Airport

United States

- New York City - John F. Kennedy Airport

Vietnam

- Ho Chi Minh City - Tan Son Nhat Airport second hub

== Fleet ==
The JES Air fleet included the following aircraft:

JES Air fleet
Aircraft	Total	Registrations	Notes
Airbus A310-200	1	LZ-JXB	Hijacked as Flight 850 and sold to Vietnam Airlines
Airbus A310-300	2	LZ-JXA; LZ-JXC	Both returned to lessors JXA was leased by Air Niugini
Total	3		

== Accidents and incidents ==
- 4 September 1992: Vietnam Airlines Flight 850, registration LZ-JXB, leased from Jes Air, with 127 occupants on board en route from Bangkok to Ho Chi Minh City, hijacked by Ly Tong, a former pilot in the Republic of Vietnam Air Force. He then dropped anti-communist leaflets over Ho Chi Minh City before parachuting out. Vietnamese security forces later arrested him on the ground. The aircraft landed safely, and no one on board was injured. Tong was incarcerated in a Hanoi prison, where he remained until 1998.
