= ULS Airlines Cargo =

Turkish cargo airline

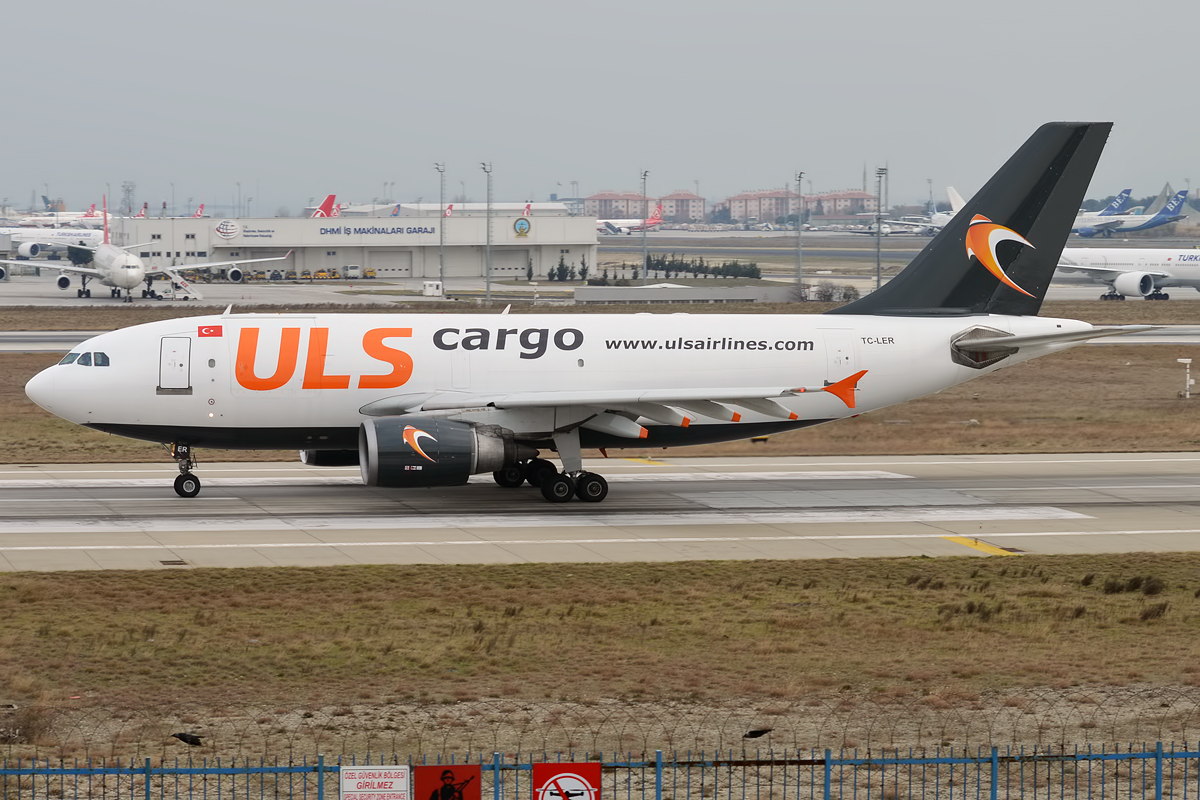
IATA	ICAO	Call sign
GO	KZU	UNIVERSAL CARGO
- Founded: 2004
- Hubs: Istanbul Airport
- Fleet size: 5
- Destinations: 10+
- Headquarters: Istanbul, Turkey
- Website: ulsairlines.com

ULS Airlines Cargo, formerly Kuzu Airlines Cargo, is a Turkish cargo airline headquartered in Istanbul with its main base at Istanbul Airport. It operates international freight services.

== History ==
The airline was established in early 2004 and started operations in June 2004. It was originally named Baron Hava Kargo, but was rebranded and renamed to Kuzu Airlines Cargo in October 2004. It is now owned by the ULS (Universal Logistics Systems) Group and had, as of June 2009, 220 employees. During late 2008 and early 2009, three Airbus A310 aircraft were added to the fleet from Emirates SkyCargo. In July 2009, Kuzu Airlines Cargo formally changed its name to ULS Airlines Cargo under a new operator's certificate.

== Destinations ==
ULS Airlines Cargo operates regular cargo flights from its main base to Lennart Meri Tallinn Airport in Estonia, as well as to destinations in the Subcontinent, Far East, Middle East, Europe, Africa and North America. It also serves a number of international destinations through interline agreements with other carriers.

== Fleet ==
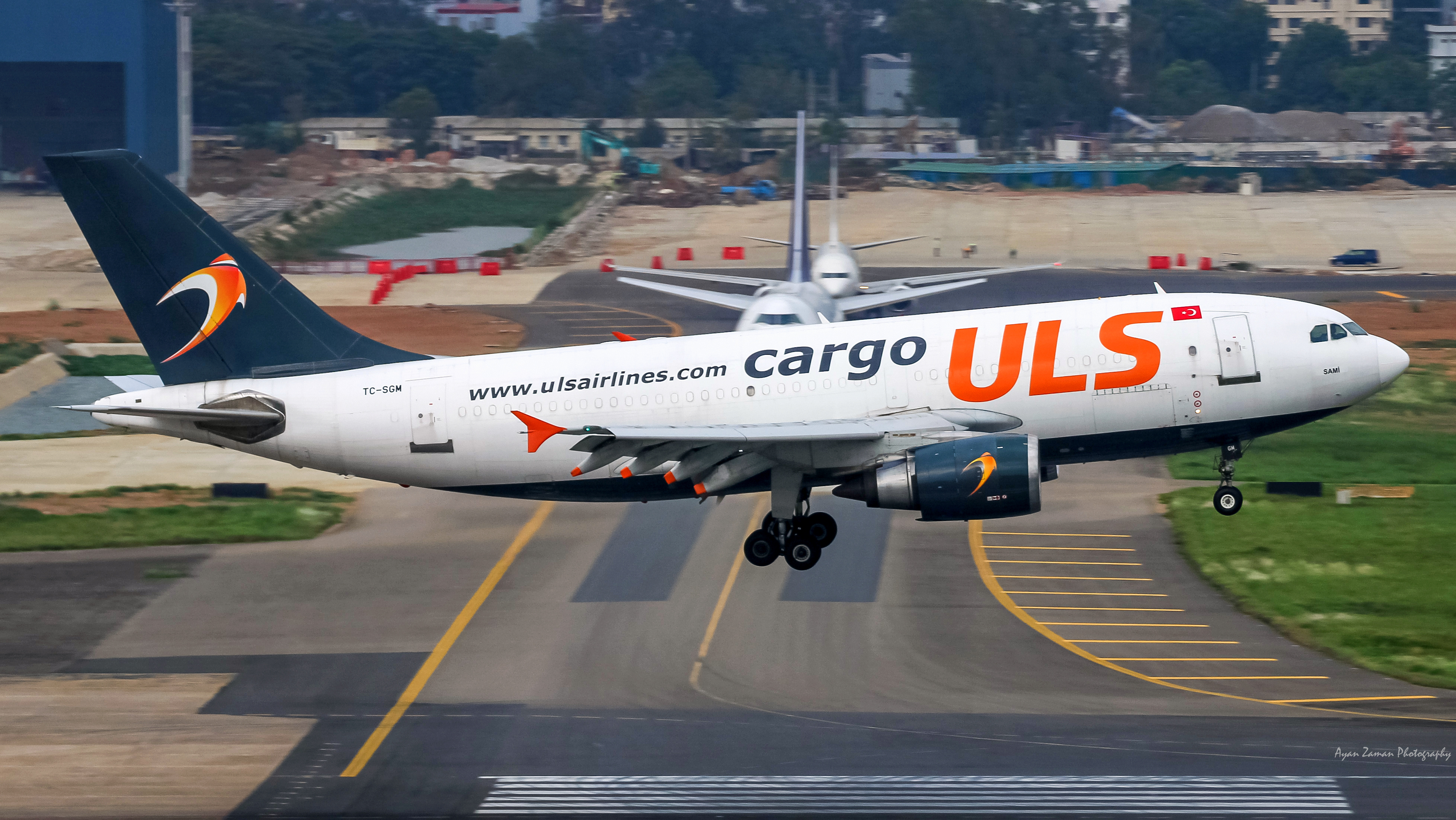
ULS Cargo Airbus A310-300F

As of January 2025, the ULS Airlines Cargo fleet consisted of the following freighter aircraft:

Aircraft	In fleet	Orders	Cargo capacity	Notes
Airbus A310-300F	3	—	40,000 kg	2 operated for Turkish Cargo
Airbus A330-300/P2F	2	—	61,300 kg	Deliveries from May 2025.
Total	5	—		
