= Thai Airways International Flight 311 =

1992 aviation accident in Nepal

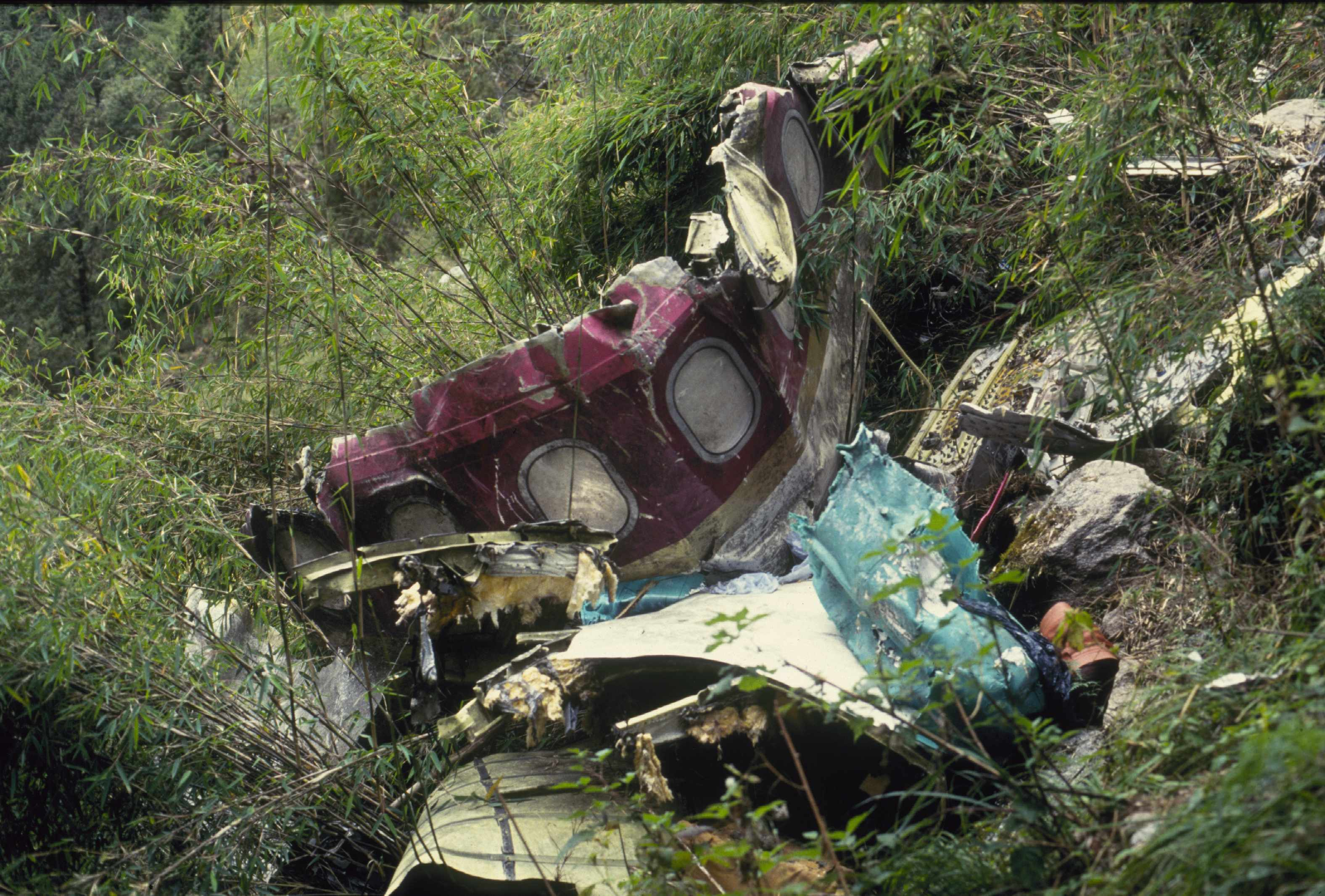
- A piece of aircraft wreckage

Accident
- Date: 31 July 1992
- Summary: Controlled flight into terrain in low visibility due to pilot error and ATC error
- Site: Ghyangphedi, Langtang National Park, Langtang, Nepal; 28°03′09″N 85°27′03″E

Aircraft
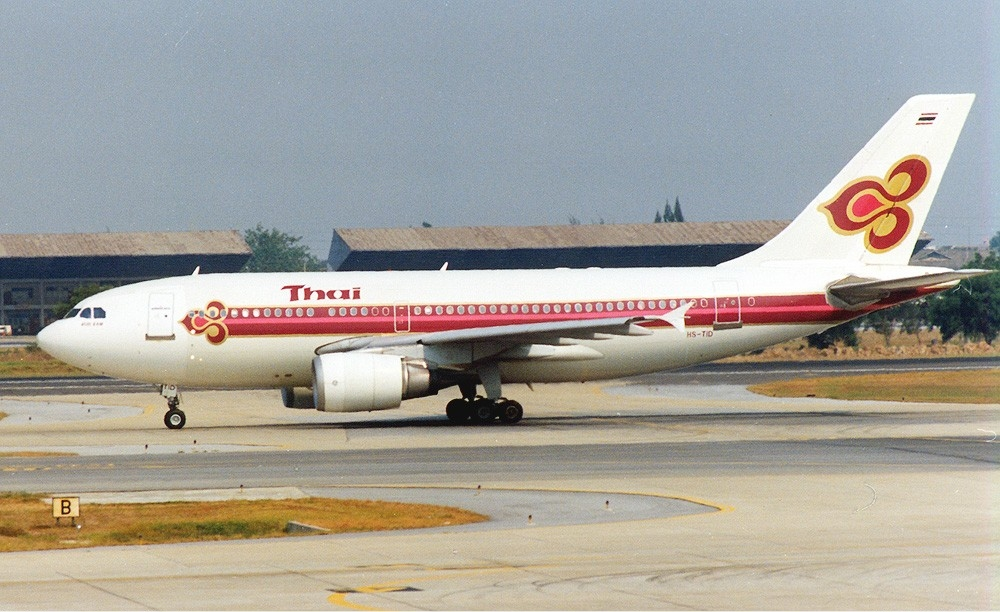
- HS-TID, the aircraft involved in the accident, pictured in April 1992
- Aircraft type: Airbus A310-304
- Aircraft name: Buri Ram
- Operator: Thai Airways International
- IATA flight No.: TG311
- ICAO flight No.: THA311
- Call sign: THAI 311
- Registration: HS-TID
- Flight origin: Don Mueang International Airport, Bangkok, Thailand
- Destination: Tribhuvan International Airport, Kathmandu, Nepal
- Occupants: 113
- Passengers: 99
- Crew: 14
- Fatalities: 113
- Survivors: 0

Thai Airways International Flight 311 (TG311/THA311) was a scheduled flight from Bangkok, Thailand's Don Mueang International Airport to Kathmandu, Nepal's Tribhuvan International Airport. On 31 July 1992, at 07:00:26 UTC (12:45:26 NST; 14:00:26 ICT), the Airbus A310 operating the route crashed into the side of a mountain 37 kilometres (23 mi; 20 nmi) north of Kathmandu, killing all 113 passengers and crew members on board. This was both the first hull loss and the first fatal accident involving the Airbus A310.

== Aircraft and crew ==
=== Aircraft ===
The aircraft involved was an Airbus A310-304, manufactured by Airbus Industrie in 1987 and registered as HS-TID with serial number 438. It was powered by two General Electric CF6-80C2A2 turbofan engines.

=== Crew ===
At the time of the accident, the aircraft had been in commercial operations for five years. It was piloted by Captain Preeda Suttimai (41), who had logged 13,200 flight hours including 4,400 on A310 and 1,700 hours as pilot in command. The first officer was Phunthat Boonyayej (52), who had logged 14,600 flight hours including 4,200 on the A310. The cabin crew consisted of 12 flight attendants, looking after 99 passengers.

== Accident ==
Flight 311 departed Bangkok at 10:30 local time (03:30 UTC). It was scheduled to arrive in Kathmandu at 12:55 Nepal Standard Time (07:10 UTC). After crossing into Nepalese airspace, the pilots contacted air traffic control (ATC) and were cleared for an instrument approach from the south called the "Sierra VOR circling approach" for Runway 20. Nepalese ATC at the time was not equipped with radar. The captain was evidently uncomfortable with this approach, as he did not want to fly so near to the higher northern mountain range and turn around in poor visibility.

Shortly after reporting the Sierra fix 10 kilometres (6.2 mi; 5.4 nmi) south of the Kathmandu VOR, the aircraft called ATC asking for a diversion to Calcutta, India, because of a "technical problem" (while attempting to extend the flaps, they had become stuck, making the steep descent into Kathmandu unsafe). Before ATC could reply, the flight rescinded their previous transmission; they retracted and re-extended the flaps properly. The flight was then cleared for a straight-in Sierra approach to Runway 02 and told to report leaving 9,500 ft (2,896 m). The captain asked numerous times for the winds and visibility at the airport, but ATC merely told him that Runway 02 was available.

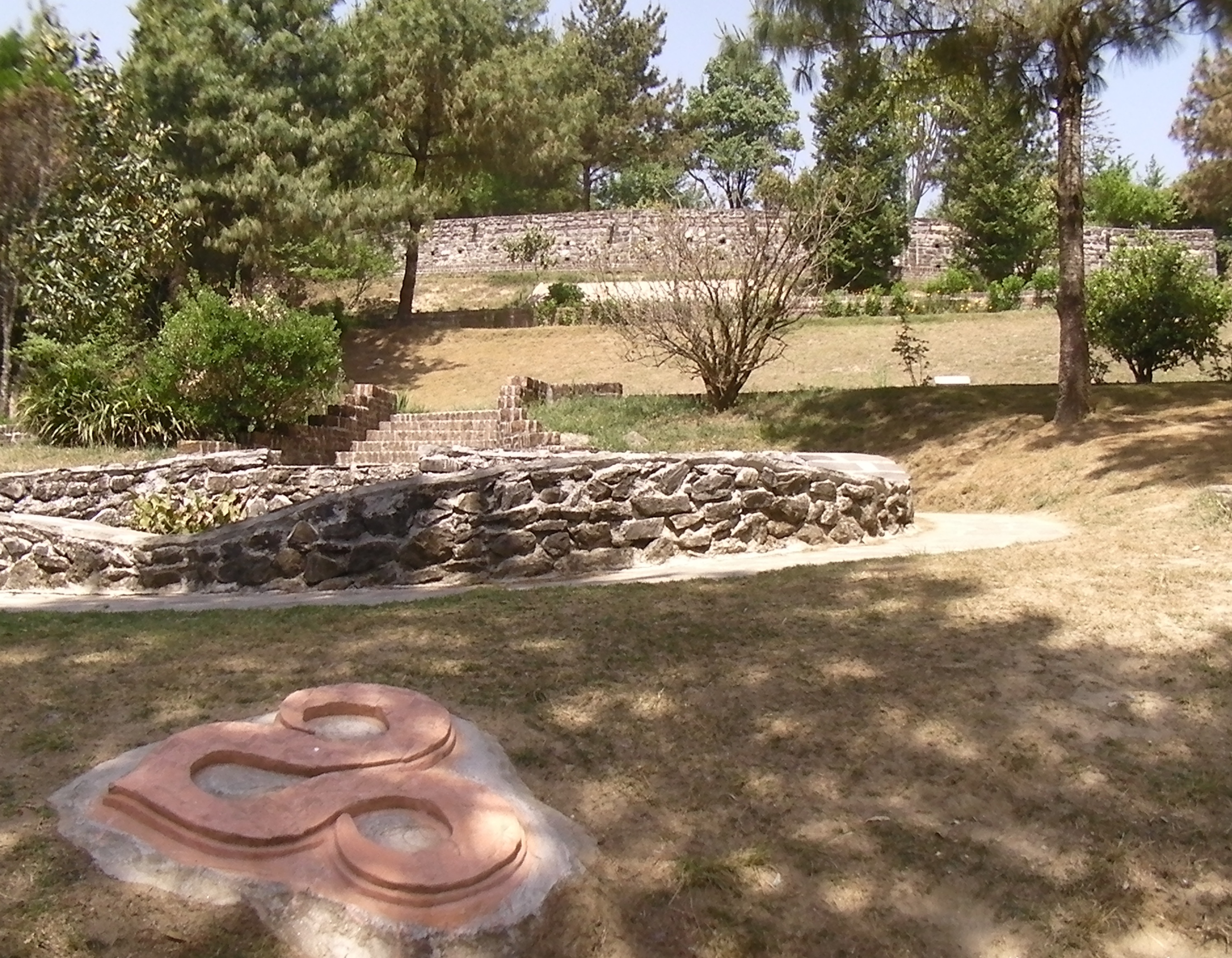
Memorial park in Kakani, Nepal

The captain asked four times for permission to turn left, but after receiving no firm reply to his requests, he announced that he was turning right and climbed the aircraft to flight level 200, intending to turn back to point Romeo and re-attempt the straight-in approach. The controller handling Flight 311 assumed from the flight's transmissions that the aircraft had called off the approach and was turning to the south, so he cleared the aircraft to 11,500 ft (3,505 m), an altitude that would have been safe in the area south of the airport. The flight descended back to 11,500 ft, unintentionally went through a nearly 360° turn (rather than a 180-degree one to return to southern point Romeo), and passed over the airport northbound.

Seconds before impact, the ground proximity warning system (GPWS) activated, and sounded alarms warning the crew of the imminent collision with the mountains. First Officer Boonyayej warned Captain Suttimai and urged him to turn the aircraft around, but possibly due to his frustration from the communications with ATC, Suttimai erroneously stated the GPWS was just giving false reports. The aircraft crashed into a steep rock face in a remote area of the Langtang National Park at an altitude of 11,500 ft (3,505 m) and with a ground speed of 300 knots (560 km/h; 350 mph), killing all 113 people on board.

== Investigation ==
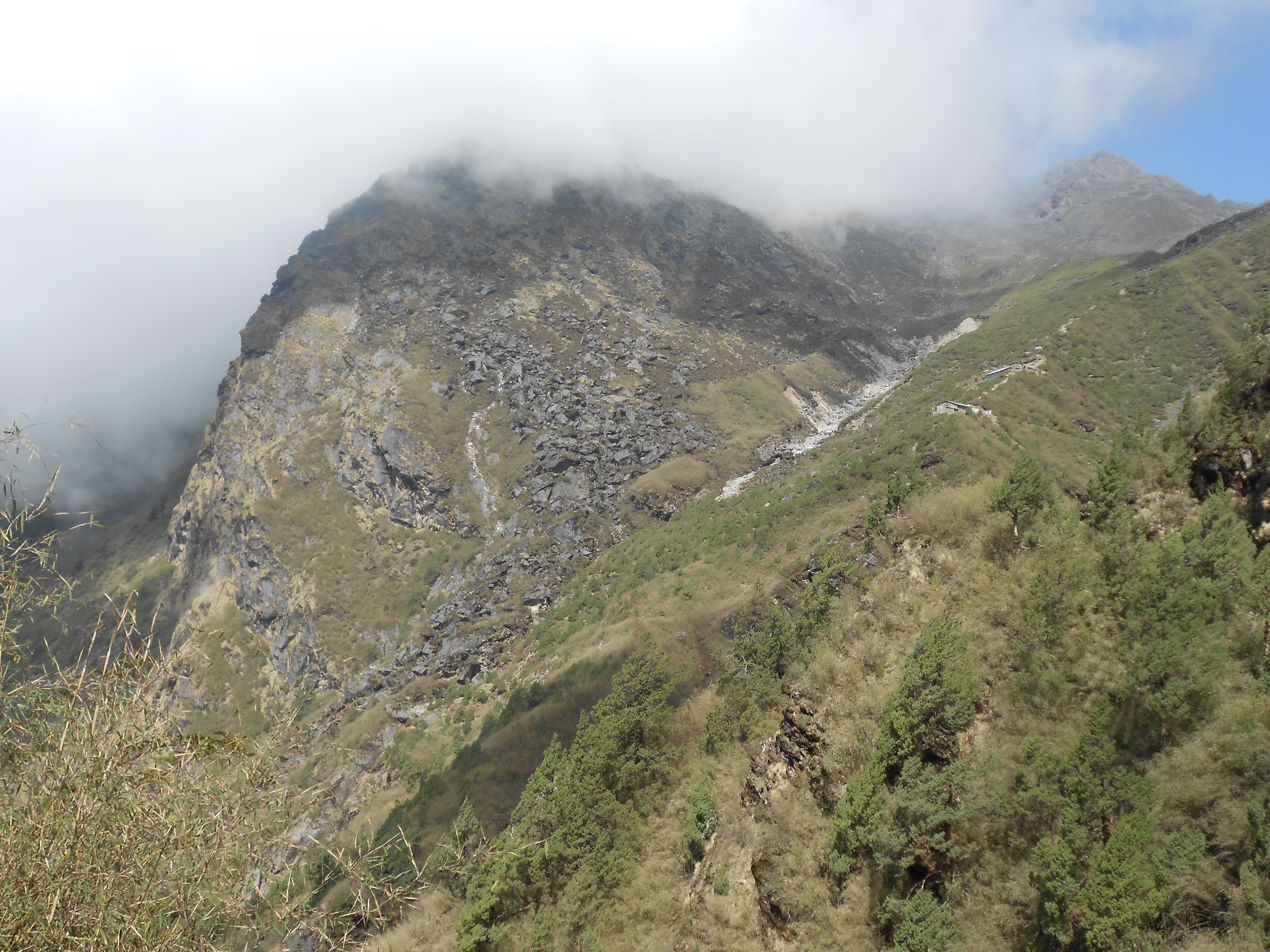
Crash site of Thai Airways Flight 311, located between Ghopte and Tharepati Pass, Nepal, photographed in May 2016

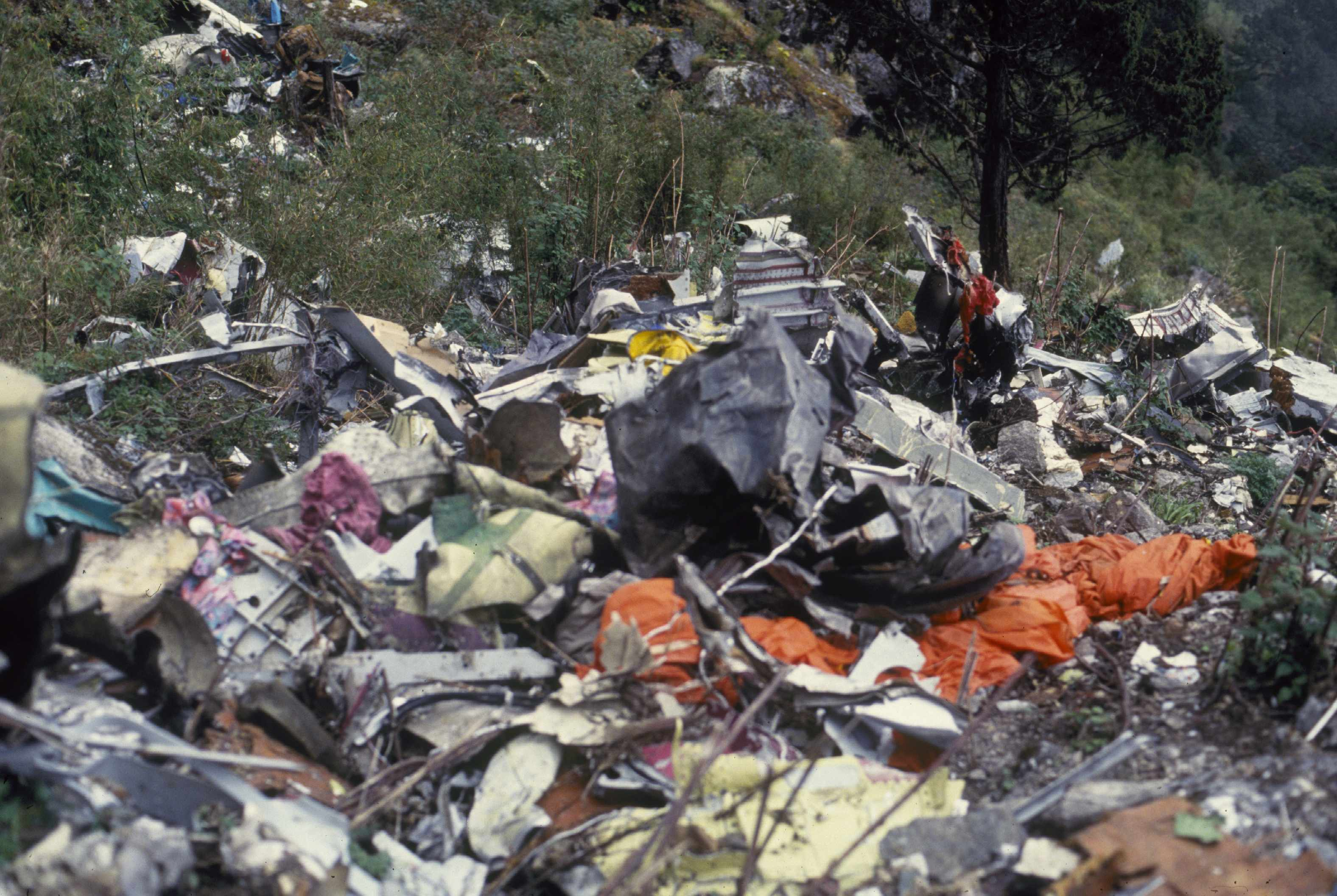
Photographs from the crash site taken in October 1992

Investigators from the Civil Aviation Authority of Nepal, Airbus Industrie, and the Transportation Safety Board of Canada (which assisted with technical details) determined that the aircraft had experienced a minor fault in the workings of the inboard trailing flaps just after the aircraft reached the Sierra reporting fix. Concerned that the complex approach into Kathmandu in instrument conditions would be difficult with malfunctioning flaps and frustrated by ATC and his first officer's inconclusive and weak answers to his questions, the captain decided to divert to Calcutta. The flaps suddenly began to work properly, but the captain was forced to resolve more aspects of the difficult approach himself due to his first officer's lack of initiative. Only after numerous extremely frustrating exchanges with ATC was the captain able to obtain adequate weather information for the airport, but by that time he had overflown Kathmandu and the aircraft was headed towards the Himalayas.

Nepalese authorities found that the probable causes of the accident were the captain and air traffic controller's loss of situational awareness; language and technical problems which caused the captain to experience frustration and a high workload; the first officer's lack of initiative and inconclusive answers to the captain's questions; the air traffic controller's inexperience, poor grasp of English, and reluctance to interfere with what he saw as piloting matters such as terrain separation; poor supervision of the inexperienced air traffic controller; Thai Airways International's failure to provide simulator training for the complex Kathmandu approach to its pilots; and improper use of the aircraft's flight management system.

While trekking up the Himalaya mountain to the crash site, a British investigator from Airbus, Gordon Corps (62), died due to altitude sickness. Corps had over 11,500 flight hours and was a senior test pilot for Airbus.

== Victims ==
Nationality	Passengers	Crew	Total
Australia	1	0	1
Belgium	5	0	5
Canada	2	0	2
Finland	5	0	5
Germany	4	0	4
Israel	2	0	2
Japan	17	0	17
Nepal	23	0	23
New Zealand	1	0	1
South Korea	2	0	2
Spain	3	0	3
Thailand	21	14	35
United Kingdom	2	0	2
United States	11	0	11
Total (14 Nationalities)	99	14	113

=== Notable deaths ===
- Uzi Peres, Israeli film director, screenwriter and film producer

== Aftermath ==
Thai Airways retired the flight number 311 after the accident, along with its counterpart flight number 312, which had been used for the outbound flight from Kathmandu to Bangkok. These were replaced by flight numbers 319 and 320, respectively. These redesignated flights continued to be operated by Airbus A310 aircraft until this type was retired by the airline and replaced with Boeing 777 aircraft in 2001. The remains of the aircraft can still be seen in Langtang National Park on the trek from Ghopte to the Tharepati Pass.

59 days after the Flight 311 disaster, Pakistan International Airlines Flight 268 crashed on approach to Kathmandu, killing all 167 on board, the deadliest accident in the country's history.

== Dramatization ==
The crash is featured in Season 17, Episode 10 of Mayday (Air Crash Investigation). The episode is titled "The Lost Plane".

== See also ==
- Aviation safety
- Controlled flight into terrain
- List of accidents and incidents involving commercial aircraft
- Pakistan International Airlines Flight 268 A similar aviation accident occurring 2 months later, also in the Himalayas on approach to Kathmandu
- China General Aviation Flight 7552 Another aviation accident that occurred on the same day
- Mandala Airlines Flight 660 Another Aviation Accident that occurred a week before Flight 311, also crashing into a mountain
- List of airplane accidents in Nepal
