= Vietnam Airlines Flight 850 =

1992 aircraft hijacking

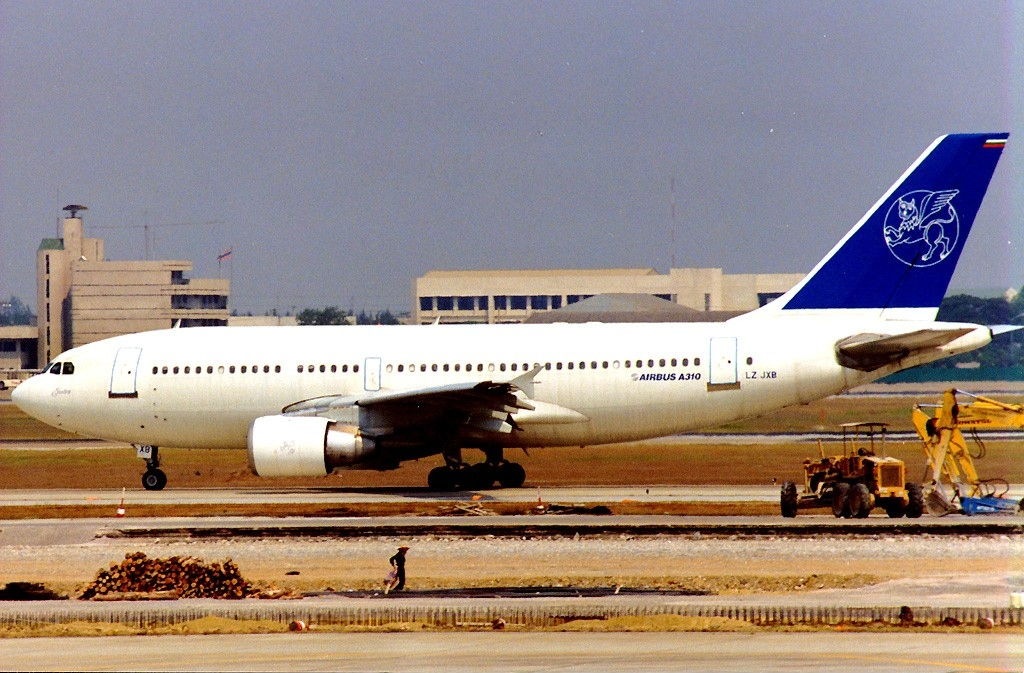
- LZ-JXB, the aircraft involved, seen at Don Mueang International Airport, Thailand in April 1992, 5 months before the hijacking

Hijacking
- Date: 4 September 1992
- Summary: Hijacking
- Site: en route

Aircraft
- Aircraft type: Airbus A310-222
- Aircraft name: Jantra
- Operator: Jes Air on behalf of Vietnam Airlines
- IATA flight No.: VN850
- ICAO flight No.: HVN850
- Call sign: VIETNAM AIRLINES 850
- Registration: LZ-JXB
- Flight origin: Don Mueang International Airport, Bangkok, Thailand
- Destination: Tan Son Nhat International Airport, Ho Chi Minh City, Vietnam
- Occupants: 127
- Passengers: 115
- Crew: 12
- Fatalities: 0
- Survivors: 127

Vietnam Airlines Flight 850 was an international scheduled passenger flight from Bangkok, Thailand, to Ho Chi Minh City, Vietnam. On 4 September 1992, the Airbus A310 operating the flight was hijacked by Ly Tong, a former pilot in the South Vietnam Air Force. He then dropped anti-communist leaflets over Ho Chi Minh City before parachuting out. Vietnamese security forces later arrested him on the ground. The aircraft landed safely, and no one on board was injured. He was released from a Hanoi prison in 1998.

== Aircraft ==
The aircraft involved, an Airbus A310-222, was a charter flight for Vietnam Airlines, operated by Jes Air (Bulgaria), registered as LZ-JXB, serial number 419, put into service in 1986 by CAAC Airlines and later in 1988 by China Eastern Airlines with registration B-2303. The aircraft was later sold to Jes Air in 1991. The aircraft was powered by Pratt & Whitney JT9D-7R4E1 engines. This is also one of the few Airbus A310-200s equipped with wingtip fences.

== Hijacking ==
On 4 September 1992, at 17:00, the flight took off from Don Mueang International Airport in Bangkok en-route to Tan Son Nhat International Airport in Ho Chi Minh City. The captain of the flight is Vitkov Tanas Styanov, nationality Bulgarian. (Note: Bulgarian: Витков Танас Стянов)

When the aircraft was about 80 miles from Ho Chi Minh City, Ly Tong, a retired South Vietnamese fighter pilot and naturalized U.S. citizen, used a inox knife and a parachute cord to threaten members of the crew. Tong claimed that he had an explosive device and had a flight attendant take him to the cockpit. Tong then forced the pilot to lower the aircraft's altitude to 500 feet (Note: Various sources disagree on the altitude at which Ly Tong forced the pilot to land. Most media outlets in Vietnam often report that he forced the plane to descend to 200 feet, while VnExpress (Vietnam's largest online newspaper) claims that he asked for it to descend to 1000 feet. The Aviation Safety Network website claims that he forced the plane to descend to 500 feet. At the 1993 trial, Ly Tong admitted to forcing the plane to descend to 200 feet, but he claimed that he later allowed the pilot to adjust the altitude to higher than 200 feet in accordance with international aviation law.), reduce speed to a minimum, and enter the restricted airspace over the city.

For the next 30 minutes, Tong threw sacks of leaflets out of the cockpit window calling for an insurrection against the communist government of Vietnam in order to "build an independent, free and prosperous Vietnam." He claimed that his actions were motivated by the collapse of the Soviet Union and the Eastern Bloc. Signing himself "Commander of the Uprising Forces," Tong subsequently donned a parachute and jumped out of an emergency exit.

No one on board the plane was injured and the plane was able to continue its flight, landing safely at Tan Son Nhat International Airport with a 38-minute delay. Among those on board the flight were Vietnam's Ambassador to the United Nations, Vo Anh Tuan, and former actress Le Hong Thuy Tien, one of the flight attendants held hostage by Ly Tong, also the mother-in-law of actress Tăng Thanh Hà.

== Aftermath ==
Tong was reportedly captured by Vietnam police in a field outside of Ho Chi Minh City two hours later. A Vietnam Airlines spokesman said that the plane was slightly damaged when a door opened "for technical reasons" in flight between Bangkok and Ho Chi Minh City but denied that a hijacking had taken place. Hanoi's Voice of Vietnam radio network later admitted that a hijacking had taken place.

On 24 February 1993, the Supreme People's Court of Ho Chi Minh City charged Tong with air piracy and sentenced him to 20 years in prison. On 2 September 1998, Vietnamese President Trần Đức Lương signed a decision to pardon and deport Ly Tong to the United States. After being pardoned, Tong continued to carry out plane hijacking missions to spread leaflets calling for the overthrow of the Cuban, Chinese, and North Korean governments. According to the inspection documents of Vietnam Airlines, Tong's act caused USD 500,000 and VND 7,000,000 damages to the company.

Two months after the hijacking, the plane was handed over by Jes Air to Vietnam Airlines. However, due to engine problems, as well as disputes over aircraft maintenance and a ban on the plane returning to Vietnam, the aircraft was left at Taiwan Taoyuan International Airport until it was handed over to China Northwest Airlines in October 1993. The aircraft was transferred to China Eastern Airlines in 2003 after the merger with China Northwest Airlines and was stored until 2006. In 2006, the aircraft was passed onto Burmese airline Air Bagan, re-registering as XY-AGD, and was stored till 2011 and on the same year, the aircraft's ownership was taken over by Singaporean aircraft lessor Phoenix Aircraft Leasing who sold the aircraft to Thai charter airline P.C. Air, re-registering as HS-PCC, where it was its sole operating aircraft until 2012 when the airline went bankrupt. The aircraft was stored and later broken up in 2020 at Don Mueang International Airport, Thailand. The airframe is now preserved as an instructional airframe at Rajamangala University of Technology Thanyaburi, where it serves as a training aid for students in the university's aviation engineering department. By 2026, this was one of the last Airbus A310-200 aircraft in use for passenger transport.

== See also ==
- Cold War
- Dissolution of the Soviet Union
- List of Vietnam Airlines accidents and incidents
- Revolutions of 1989
- Vietnam Civil Aviation Flight 509
- Vietnam Civil Aviation Flight 501
