= Airbus A310 =

Short-fuselage derivative of the Airbus A300 airliner

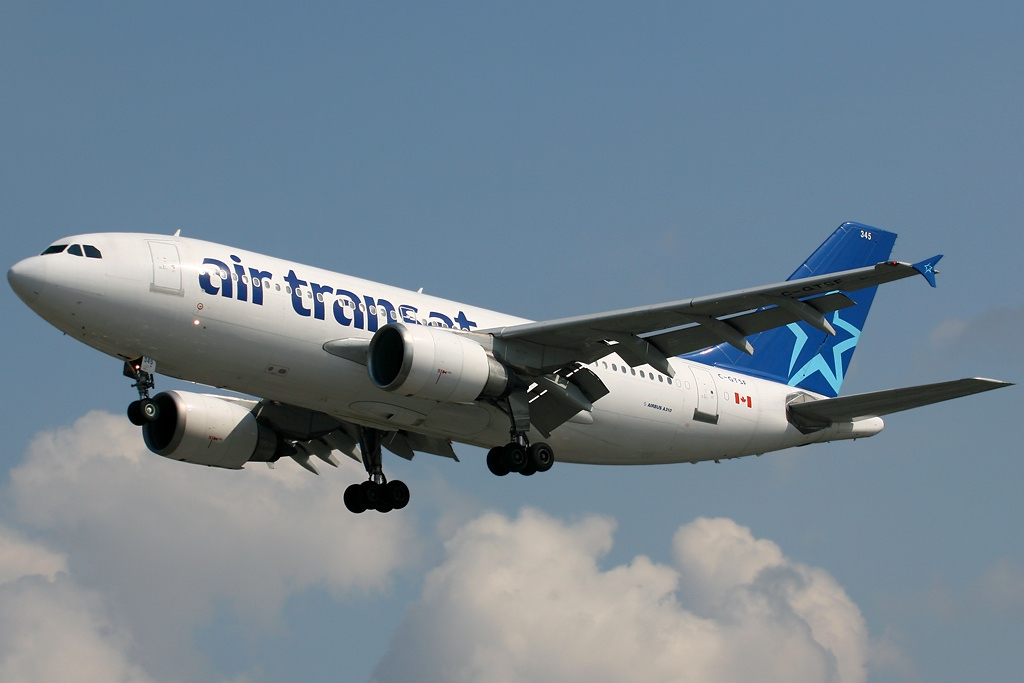
- An A310 of Air Transat in 2009

General information
- Role: Wide-body aircraft
- National origin: Multi-national (Note: Final assembly in France)
- Manufacturer: Airbus
- Status: In limited service
- Primary users: Mahan Air: ULS Airlines Cargo; Iran Air; Ariana Afghan Airlines
- Number built: 255

History
- Manufactured: 1981–1998
- Introduction date: April 1983 with Swissair
- First flight: 3 April 1982; 44 years ago
- Developed from: Airbus A300
- Variants: Airbus A310 MRTT; Airbus CC-150 Polaris

The Airbus A310 is a wide-body airliner designed and manufactured by Airbus Industrie GIE, then a consortium of European aerospace manufacturers. Airbus had identified a demand for an aircraft smaller than the A300, the first twin-jet wide-body. On 7 July 1978, the A310 (initially the A300B10) was launched with orders from Swissair and Lufthansa. On 3 April 1982, the first prototype conducted its maiden flight, and the A310 received its type certificate on 11 March 1983.

Keeping the same eight-abreast cross-section, the A310 is 6.95 m (22 ft 10 in) shorter than the initial A300 variants, has a smaller wing, down from 260 to 219 m^{2} (2,800 to 2,360 sq ft), and a longer flying range up to 5,150 nautical miles (9,540 km; 5,930 mi). The A310 introduced a two-crew glass cockpit, later adopted for the A300-600 with a common type rating. It was powered by the same General Electric CF6-80 or Pratt & Whitney JT9D then PW4000 turbofan jet engines. It can seat 220 passengers in two classes, or 240 in all-economy. It has overwing exits between the two main front and rear door pairs.

In April 1983, the aircraft entered revenue service with Swissair, and competed with the Boeing 767-200, introduced six months before. Its longer range and ETOPS certification allowed it to be operated on transatlantic flights. It was also available as a cargo aircraft and in military variants: the A310 MRT (multi-role transport), which was further developed into the A310 MRTT (multi-role tanker transport). The aircraft was replaced by the larger Airbus A330-200. Production ended after 255 aircraft were produced, with the final A310 being delivered in June 1998.

== Development ==
=== Background ===
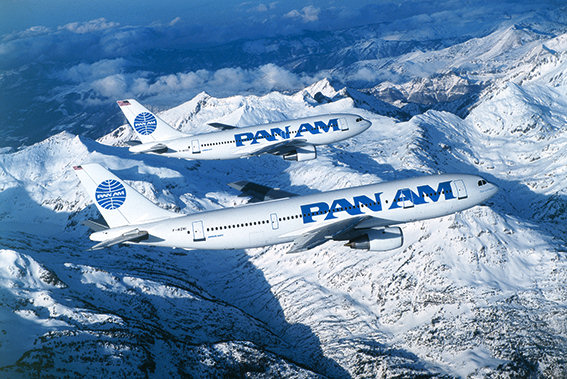
The A310 (background) is a shrunken version of the Airbus A300 (foreground)

On 26 September 1967, the governments of France, West Germany and the United Kingdom signed a memorandum of understanding to commence the joint development of the 300-seat Airbus A300. The French and West Germans reached a firm agreement on 29 May 1969, after the British withdrew from the project on 10 April 1969. This collaborative effort between the two states resulted in the production of the consortium's first airliner, known as the Airbus A300. The A300 was a wide-body medium-to-long range passenger airliner; it holds the distinction of being the first twin-engine wide-body aircraft in the world. The design was relatively revolutionary for its time, and featured a number of industry firsts, making the first use of composite materials on a commercial aircraft; during 1977, the A300 became the first ETOPS-compliant aircraft, which was made possible due to its high performance and safety standards. The A300 would be produced in a range of models, and sold relatively well to airlines across the world, eventually reaching a total of 561 delivered aircraft during its production life.

During the development of the earlier A300, a range of different aircraft size and capacity were studied by the consortium; the resulting Airbus A300B proposal was one of the smaller options. When the A300B1 prototypes emerged, a number of airlines issued requests for an aircraft with greater capacity, which resulted in the initial production A300B2 version. As the A300 entered service, it became increasingly apparent that there was also a sizeable market for a smaller aircraft; some operators did not have enough traffic to justify the relatively large A300, while others wanted more frequency or lower aircraft-distance costs at the expense of higher seat-distance cost (specifically Swissair and Lufthansa). At the same time, there was great pressure for Airbus to validate itself beyond the design and manufacture of a single airliner. In response to these desires, Airbus explored the options for producing a smaller derivative of the A300B2.

=== Design effort ===
We showed the world we were not sitting on a nine-day wonder, and that we wanted to realise a family of planes... we won over customers we wouldn't otherwise have won... now we had two planes that had a great deal in common as far as systems and cockpits were concerned.

— Jean Roeder, chief engineer of Airbus, speaking of the A310

In order to minimise the associated research and development costs for the tentative project, Airbus chose to examine several early design studies performed during the A300 programme. The company ultimately chose to prioritise its focus on one option, which became known as the A300B10MC (standing for Minimum Change). As envisioned, the airliner's capacity was reduced to a maximum of 220 passengers, which was viewed at the time as being a desired capacity amongst many airlines. However, such a design would have resulted in a relatively small fuselage being mated to a comparatively large wing and oversized undercarriage; such an arrangement would have, amongst other things, made the aircraft consume an unnecessarily larger amount of fuel as it carried heavier weight than what was otherwise required.

Another problem for the programme was presented in the form of inflation, the rate of which in the United Kingdom (one of the early members of the Airbus consortium) was around 20 per cent during 1979–80. This factor was responsible for significantly raising the program's development costs and, as a knock-on effect, increase the per-unit cost of the resulting airliner. During the development of the A300, British manufacturer Hawker Siddeley Aviation (HSA) had been appointed as the subcontractor to perform the manufacturing of the wing of the aircraft; shortly afterwards, the British government chose to withdraw from the newly formed venture during 1969. In 1977, HSA subsequently merged with three other British aircraft companies, resulting in the formation of British Aerospace (BAe). By this point in time, the British government had publicly indicated its intentions to rejoin the Airbus programme. In May 1976, the French government entered into a series of discussions on cooperation, during which its representatives stated that the placing of an order by British Airways (BA) was a condition for the re-admission of the United Kingdom into Airbus Industrie as a full partner.

However, both BA and Rolls-Royce had not relinquished their will to collaborate with the Americans in future aircraft endeavours and, in BA's case, procure American aircraft. During the late 1970s, BA sought to purchase two separate types of aircraft in development by American company Boeing, initially known as the 7N7 and 7X7, which would develop into the 757 and 767, the latter of which being an intended rival to the upcoming A310, as well as the existing Boeing 747. Independent of the British government, BAe commenced its own dialogue between itself and American aircraft manufacturers Boeing and McDonnell Douglas, for the purpose of assessing if BAe could participate in any of their future programmes, although the company's chairman, Lord Beswick, publicly stated that the overall aim of the firm was to pursue collaboration in Europe. At the 1978 Farnborough Air Show, Eric Varley, the British Secretary of State for Industry, announced that BAe was to rejoin Airbus Industrie and participate as a full partner from 1 January 1979 onwards. Under the negotiated arrangement, BAe would be allocated a 20 per cent shareholding in Airbus Industrie, and would perform "a full part in the development and manufacturing of the A310".

From late 1977, prior to the Varley announcement, BAe had already commenced work on the design of the new wing at its facility in Hatfield. However, due to negotiations with Britain on its return to the Airbus consortium being protracted, alternative options were explored, including potentially manufacturing the wing elsewhere. At the same time as the British efforts, French aerospace firm Aérospatiale, German aircraft manufacturer Messerschmitt-Bölkow-Blohm (MBB), and Dutch-German joint venture company VFW-Fokker were also conducting their individual studies into possible options for the wing of the prospective airliner.

=== Programme launch ===
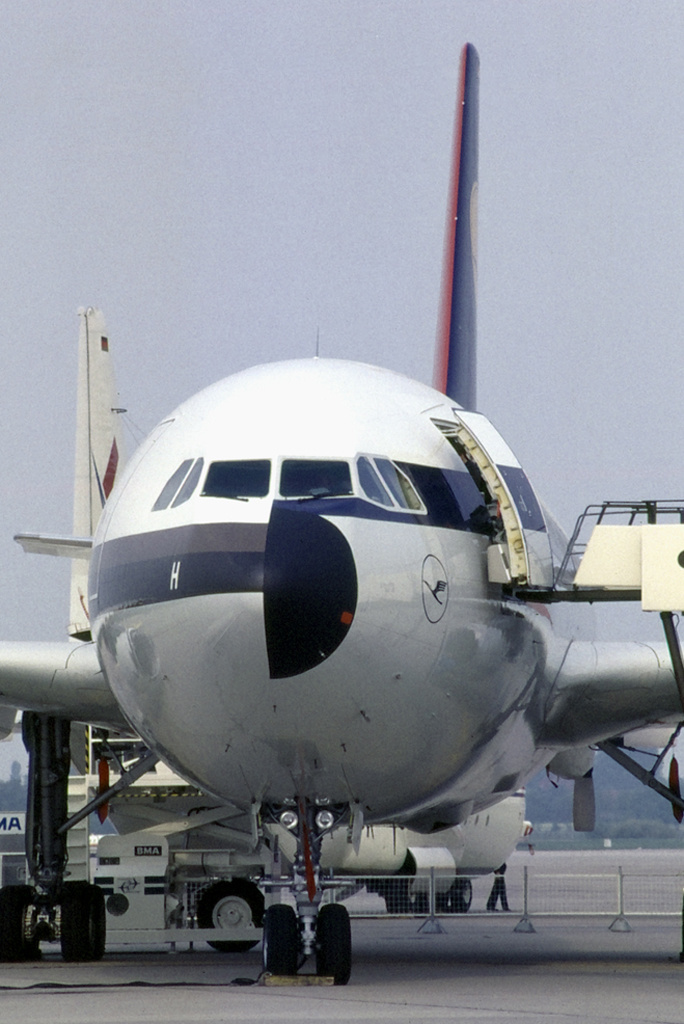
The A310-200 prototype, featuring the liveries of Swissair (left) and Lufthansa (right), the first customers.

At the April 1978 Hannover Air Show, Airbus exhibited a model of the proposed A310. Its wing area, at 219.25 m^{2} (2,360.0 sq ft) was slightly larger than that studied, at 209 m^{2} (2,250 sq ft); its passenger cabin was twelve frames shorter than the A300, (Note: The fuselage is 14 frames (7.42 m) shorter than the A300 fuselage, but the rear bulkhead was set 2 frames farther into the tailcone, so that only 12 frames of seating capacity were lost in the shortened version.) accommodating typical passenger loads of 195 in two-class, or 245 in all-economy. However, during the next twelve months, almost every aspect was further refined. On 9 June 1978, Swissair and Lufthansa developed a joint specification for the aircraft, and within a month, announced that they would place the launch orders. On 15 March, Swissair became the first airline to place a firm order for the type, announcing that it would acquire ten aircraft, with a further ten under option, to replace its McDonnell Douglas DC-9s on its major intra-European routes. Lufthansa was quick to place a $240 million ten-aircraft order; additional orders from French operator Air France and Spanish airline Iberia shortly followed.

Increasingly strong interest in the tentative airliner, coupled with the recovery of the industry during the late 1970s, contributed to Airbus deciding to put the A310 into production on 7 July 1978. During the latter half of 1978, an order for ten A300s was placed by independent British airline Laker Airways, satisfying Airbus's demand for the placing of a British order for their aircraft. On 1 April 1979, Lufthansa decided to raise its commitment for the type to 25 aircraft, along with 25 options. Two days later, Dutch operator KLM signed its order for ten aircraft and ten options at £238 million. On 6 July 1979, Air France announced that it had raised its order from four to thirty-five airliners. Other airlines announcing orders for the A310 during 1979 included Martinair, Sabena, and Air Afrique.

Initially, a pair of distinct versions of the A310 had been planned by Airbus; the regional A310-100, and the transcontinental A310-200. The A310-100 featured a range of 2,000 nmi (3,700 km; 2,300 mi) with 200 passengers, whilst the A310-200 possessed a higher MTOW and centre section fuel, being able to carry the same load a further 1,000 nmi (1,900 km; 1,200 mi). Basic engines offered for the type included the General Electric CF6-45B2 and Pratt & Whitney JT9D-7R4. At one point, British engine manufacturer Rolls-Royce was openly considering offering an engine for the A310, the Rolls-Royce RB.207, however, it ultimately chose to discard such efforts in favour of a smaller three-spool design, the RB.211.

=== Entry into service ===
The range of the A310 exceeds that of the A300 series, with the exception of the A300-600R, which in turn surpasses that of the A310-200. The greater range of the A310 contributed to the airliner being used extensively by operators on transatlantic routes. The A300 and A310 introduced the concept of commonality: A300-600 and A310 pilots can cross-qualify for the other aircraft with one day of training.

Sales of the A310 continued through the early 1980s. On 3 April 1982, the prototype A310-200 airliner conducted its maiden flight; by this point, the type had accumulated a combined orders and options for 181 aircraft, which had been placed by fifteen airlines worldwide, which was a better start than the original A300. The launch customer of A310, Swissair, became the launch operator in April 1983. Over time, it had become clear that the longer-range series −200 aircraft was the more popular of the two models on offer. During 1979, in response to the lack of demand for the A310-100, Airbus decided to stop offering the lower gross weight model which had been originally proposed for Lufthansa; as a consequence, none of this variant were ultimately manufactured.

=== Sales and production end ===
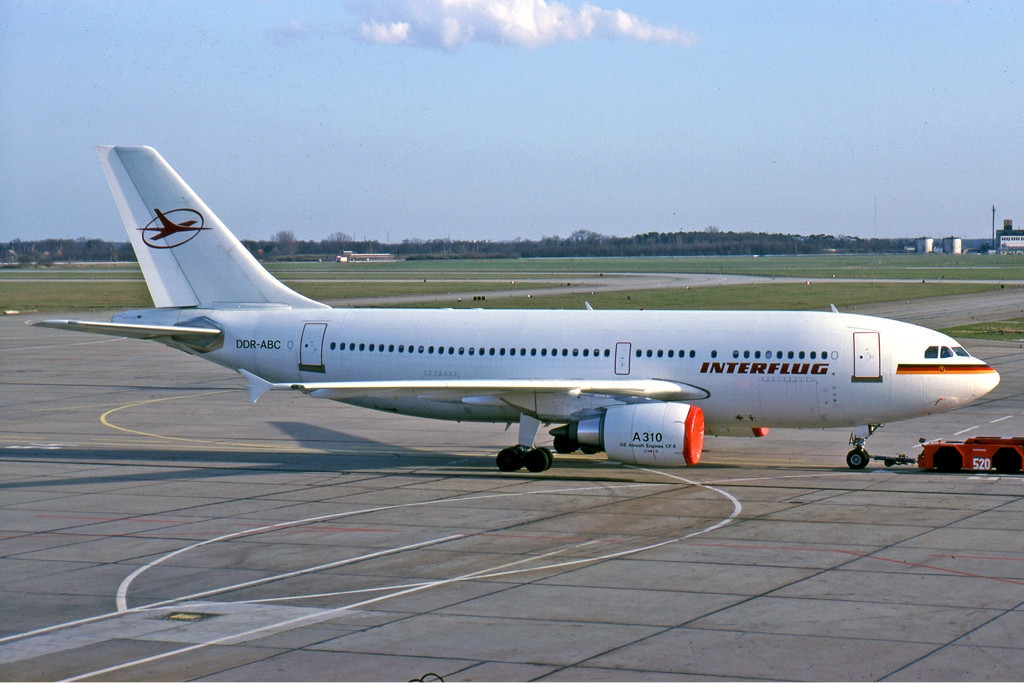
In 1988, an A310 was delivered to Interflug: the first Airbus for an Eastern-bloc airline.

During the early 1990s, demand for the aircraft began to slacken; there were no new A310 passenger orders placed during the late 1990s, in part due to the introduction of the newer and more advanced Airbus A330 during this time. As a result, on June 15, 1998, the last delivery of an A310 (msn. 706, reg.UK-31003) was made to Uzbekistan Airways. The A310, along with its A300 stablemate, ceased production during July 2007, though an order from Iraqi Airways for five A310s had remained on the books until July 2008. The remaining freighter sales were to be instead fulfilled by the new A330-200F derivative.

The A310 had been commonly marketed as an introduction to wide-body operations for airlines based in developing countries. The airliner was replaced in Airbus's range by the highly successful A330-200, which shares its fuselage cross-section. Between 1983, and the last aircraft produced in 1998, 255 A310s were delivered. The A300 and A310 established Airbus as a competitor to Boeing, and allowed it to go ahead with the more ambitious A320, and A330 / A340 families.

The Royal Canadian Air Force (RCAF) currently operates a fleet of five Airbus CC-150 Polaris, civilian Airbus A310-300s, originally owned by Wardair, and subsequently Canadian Airlines International, after the airlines merged. The aircraft were then sold to the Government of Canada, and converted for use as the primary long-distance transport aircraft as part of the RCAF's fleet of Royal Canadian Air Force VIP aircraft.

As of January 2025, only 33 remain in service, with 22 being ACJs, eight being in passenger service (with Ariana Afghan Airlines (3), Iran Air (1), Iran Airtour (4) being the only remaining passenger operators) and three in cargo service with UPS Airlines.

== Design ==
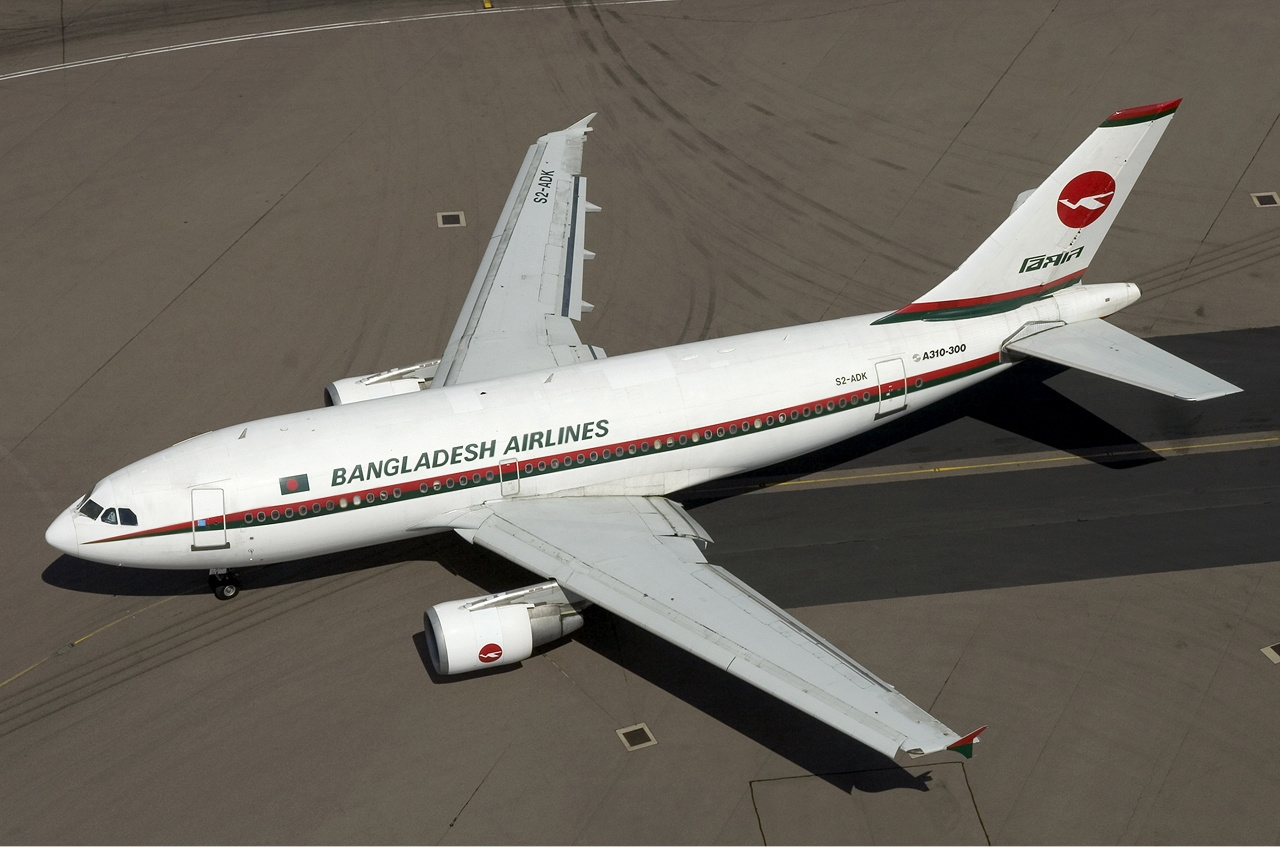
The A310 has front and rear main doors, and a smaller emergency exit wing door over the wing.

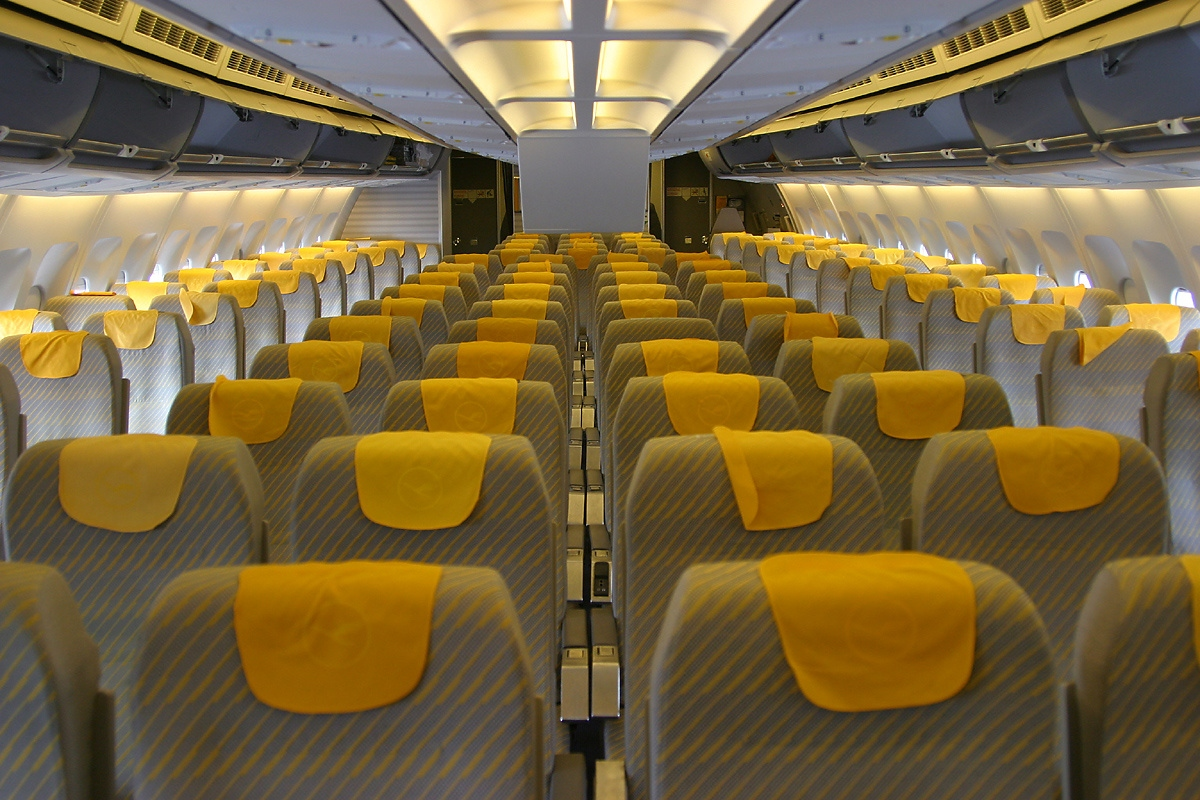
2-4-2 economy cabin

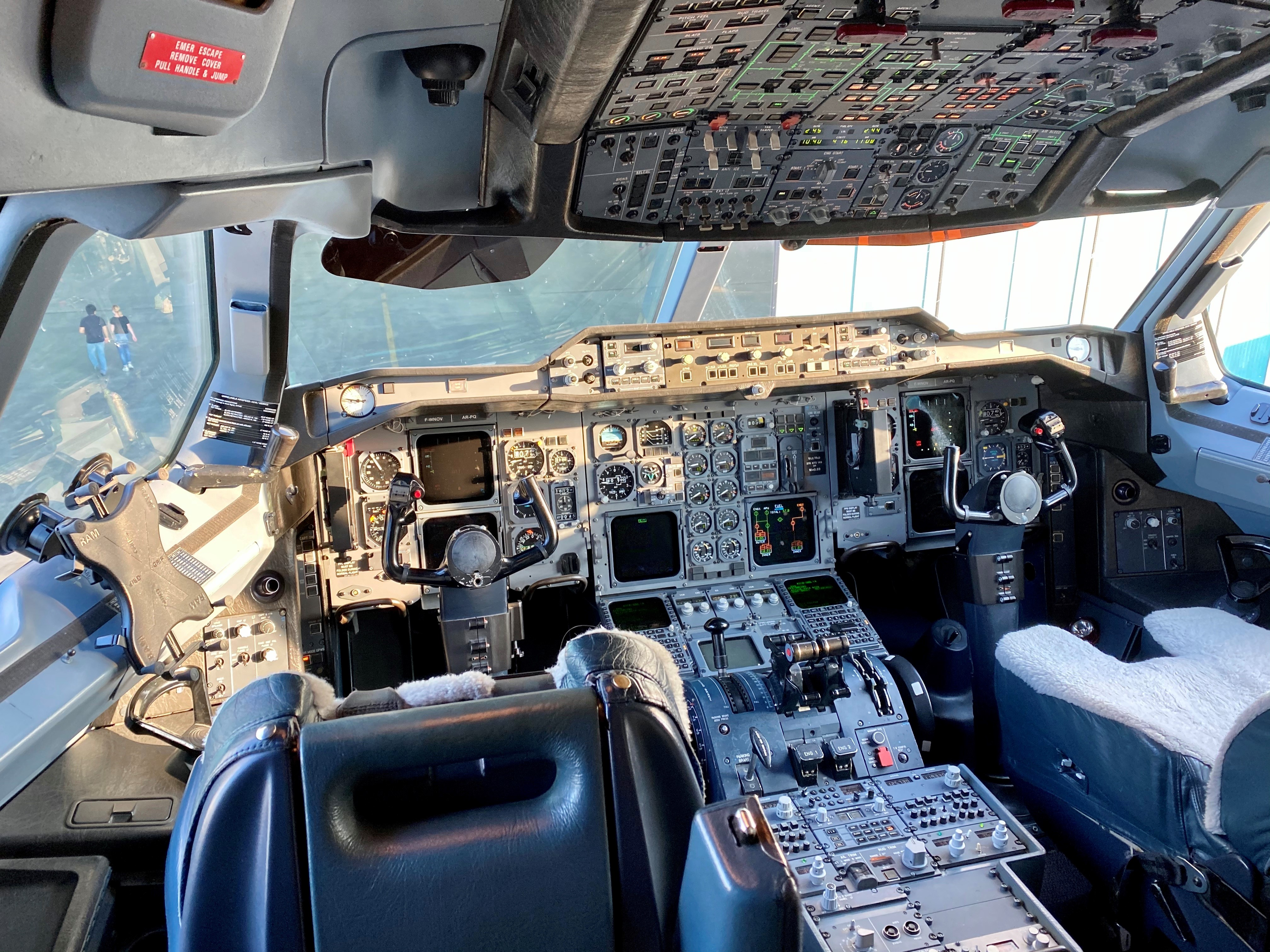
The cockpit of the Airbus A310

The Airbus A310 is a medium- to long-range twin-engined wide-body jet airliner. Initially a derivative of the A300, the aircraft had originally been designated the A300B10. It was essentially a shortened variant of the earlier aircraft; however, there were considerable differences between the two aircraft. Specifically, the fuselage possessed the same cross-section, but being shorter than the A300, it provided capacity for a typical maximum of 200 passengers. The rear fuselage was heavily re-designed, featuring altered tapering, while involved a move aft of the rear bulkhead to create additional capacity; this same design change was later transferred back to later variants of the A300, such as the A300-600 and A330/A340 fuselages. The A310 also had a different emergency exit configuration, consisting of four main doors (two at the front and two at the rear of the aircraft), and two smaller doors over the wings.

The wing of the A310 was redesigned, possessing a reduced span and wing area, and incorporating simpler single-slotted Fowler flaps designed by British Aerospace shortly following its decision to join the Airbus consortium. Other changes to the wing included the elimination of the outer ailerons, which were occasionally referred to by the manufacturer as being "low speed ailerons", and the addition of electrically actuated spoilers. The wing also featured common pylons, which were able to support all types of engines that were offered to customers to power the airliner. From 1985 onwards, the A310-300 introduced wingtip fences which reduced vortex drag and thus improved cruise fuel consumption by over 1.5%. A limited number of alterations were also performed to the airliner's tail unit, such as the adoption of smaller horizontal tail surfaces.

The A310 was furnished with a two-crew glass cockpit configuration as standard, removing the requirement for a flight engineer; Airbus referred to this concept as the Forward-Facing Crew Cockpit. The company had developed the cockpit to significantly enhance the aircraft's man-machine interface, thereby improving operational safety. It was outfitted with an array of six computer-based cathode-ray tube (CRT) displays to provide the flight crew with centralised navigational, warning, monitoring, and general flight information, in place of the more traditional analogue instrumentation and dials, which were used in conjunction with a range of modern electronic systems. The same flight deck was incorporated into the A300-600, a move which increased commonality between the two types, and enabled a dual type rating to be achieved, this same approach was later used on many future Airbus aircraft. In addition to the two flying crew, provisions for third and fourth crew seats were present within the flight deck.

The A310 was initially proposed with a choice of three engines: the General Electric CF6-80A1, the Pratt & Whitney JT9D-7R4D1, and the Rolls-Royce RB211-524. The A310 was launched with the Pratt & Whitney JT9D-7R4D1 or the General Electric CF6-80A3. Subsequently, available were the 53,500 lbf (238 kN) CF6-80C2A2 or the 52,000 lbf (230 kN)PW4152. From late 1991 the higher thrust 59,000 lbf (260 kN) CF6-80C2A8 or 56,000 lbf (250 kN)PW4156A became available.

The A310 was equipped with a modified undercarriage, derived from the A300; the landing gear were outfitted with carbon brakes, which were fitted as standard. The structure of the airliner featured a high level of composite materials throughout both primary and secondary structures, increased beyond that of the earlier A300. The A310 is outfitted with integrated drive electrical generators along with auxiliary power unit, which were improved versions of those used on the A300.

== Variants ==
The A310 is available in two basic versions: the medium-range A310-200 and the longer-range A310-300. The first version of the aircraft to be developed was the -200, but this was later joined by the -300, which then became the standard production version of the aircraft. The short-range -100 variant was never developed due to low demand.

=== A310-200 ===
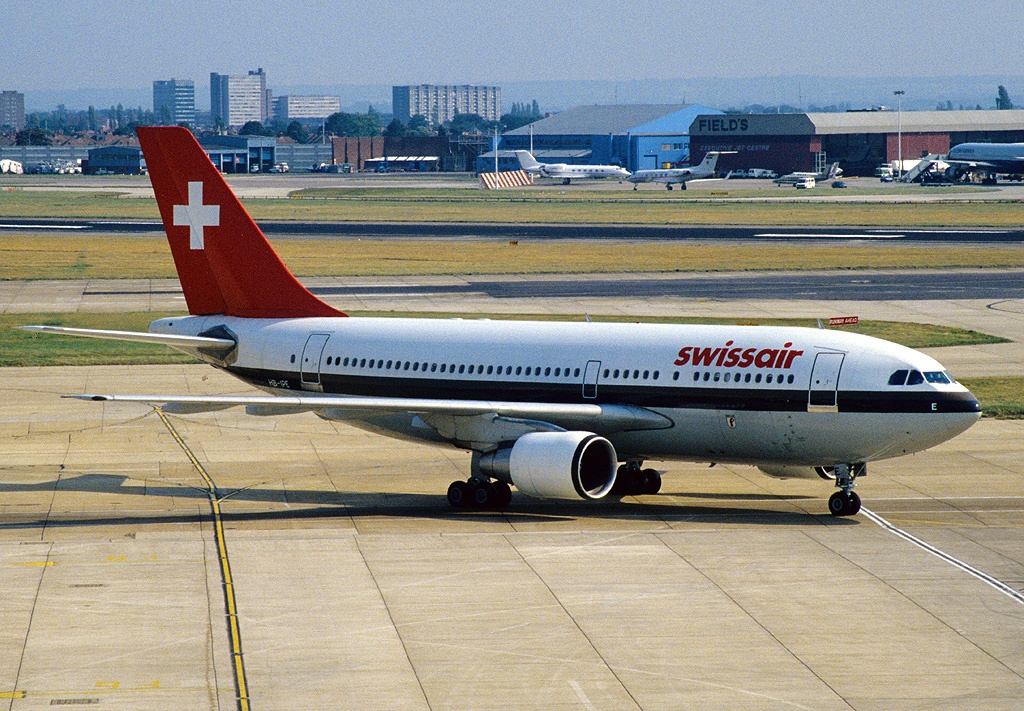
The prototype Airbus A310-200

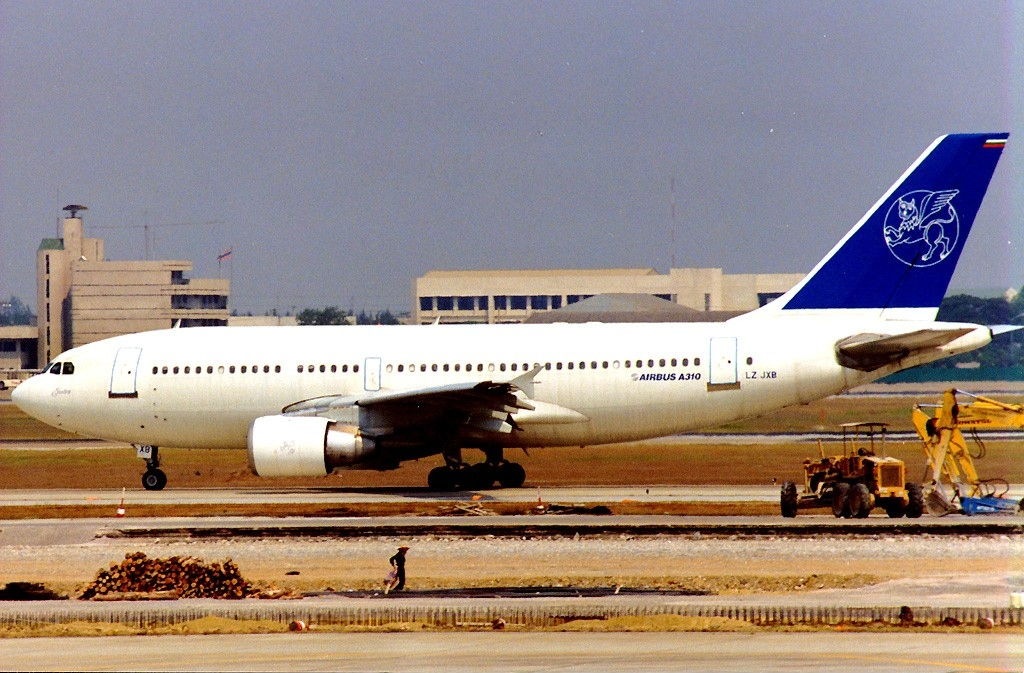
Jes Air A310-200 with wingtip fences

The first A310, the 162nd Airbus off the production line, made its maiden flight on 3 April 1982 powered by the earlier Pratt & Whitney JT9D-7R4D1 engines. The -200 entered service with Swissair and Lufthansa a year later. Late series -200 also featured wing fences identical to those of the -300. The first three A310s were initially fitted with outboard ailerons; they were later removed once testing showed them to be unnecessary. Production of the A310-200 ended in 1988.

=== A310-200C ===
A convertible version, the seats can be removed and cargo placed on the main deck, the A310-200C entered service with Martinair on 29 November 1984.

=== A310-200F ===
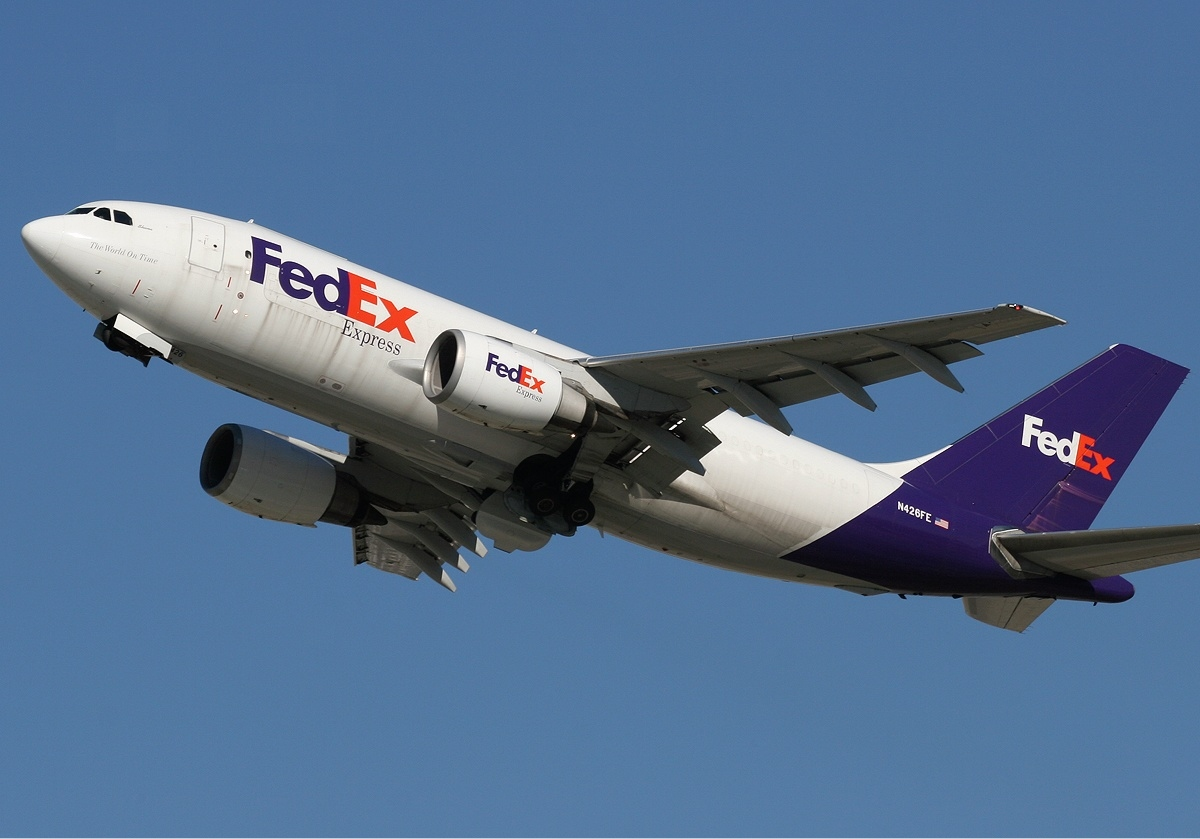
FedEx Express A310-200F without wingtip fences

The freight version of the A310-200 was available as a new build, or as a conversion of existing wide-bodied aircraft. The A310-200F freighter can carry 39 t (86,000 lb) of freight for 5,950 km (3,210 nmi; 3,700 mi). No production freighters of the A310-200F were produced. The converted Airbus A310-200F entered service with FedEx Express in 1994.

=== A310-300 ===
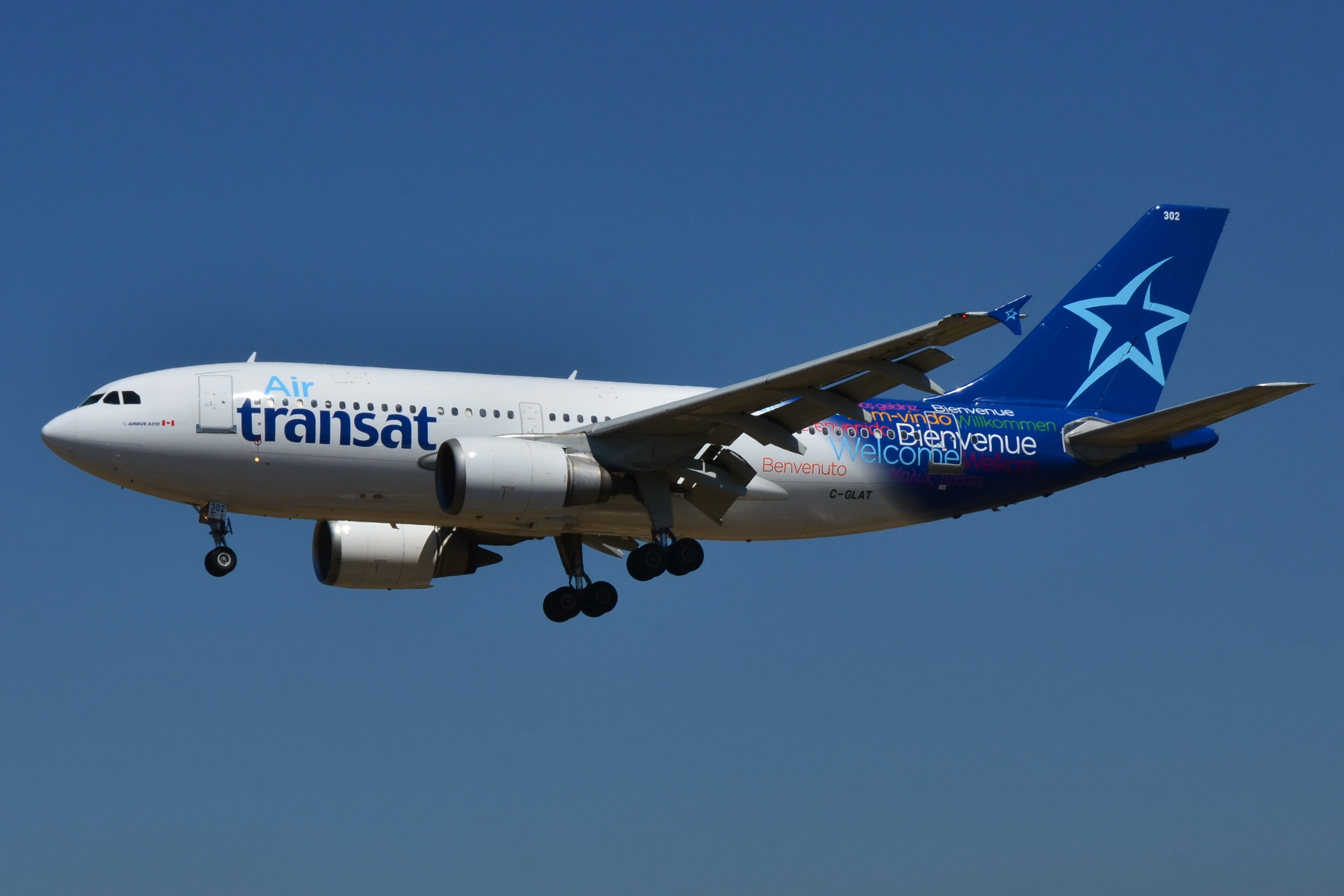
Air Transat A310-300 with wingtip fences

First flown on 8 July 1985, the -300 is dimensionally identical to the -200, although it provides an increased Maximum Take-Off Weight (MTOW) and an increase in range, provided by additional centre and horizontal stabiliser (trim-tank) fuel tanks. This model also introduced wingtip fences to improve aerodynamic efficiency, a feature that has since been retrofitted to some -200s. The aircraft entered service in 1986 with Swissair. The A310-300 incorporates a computerised fuel distribution system which allows it to be trimmed in flight, optimising the centre of gravity by shuttling up to 5,000 kg (11,000 lb) of fuel in and out of the horizontal stabiliser tank, controlled by the Centre of Gravity Control Computer.

=== A310-300C ===
The combi version of the A310-300. It can be easily converted for passenger or cargo transport: the seats can be removed and cargo placed on the main deck.

=== A310-300F ===
The freight version of the A310-300. Operators such as FedEx Express acquired modified ex-passenger A310s, usually starting with the -300 version. No production freighters of the A310-300F were produced.

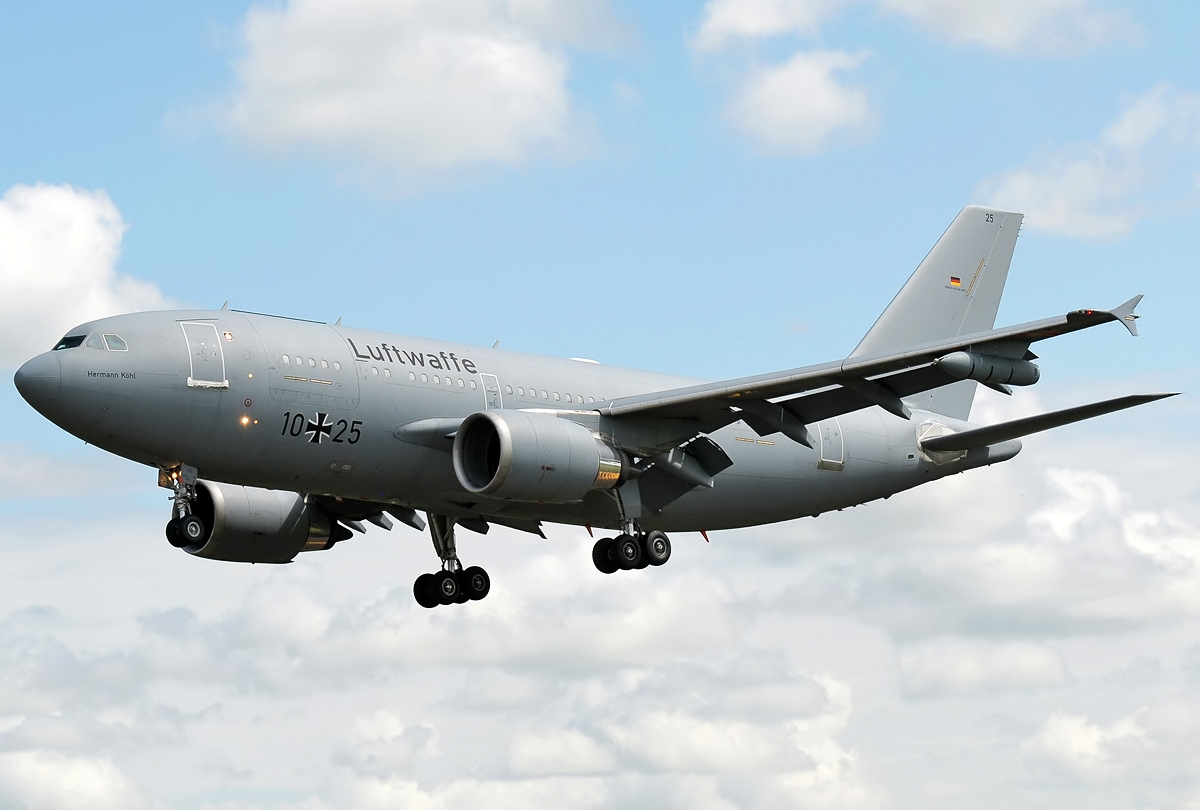
Airbus A310 MRTT of the German Air Force

=== A310 MRT/MRTT ===
The A310 has been operated by several air forces as a pure transport, the A310-300 MRT (Multi-Role Transport). However several have now been converted to the A310 MRTT (Multi-Role Tanker Transport) configuration by EADS, providing an air-to-air refuelling capability. At least six have been completed; four by the German Air Force (Luftwaffe), and two by the Royal Canadian Air Force (RCAF). Deliveries began in 2004. Three were converted at EADS EFW in Dresden, Germany; the other three at Lufthansa Technik in Hamburg, Germany.

=== A310 Zero G ===
One A310 airframe became a scientific research laboratory dedicated to weightlessness. This reduced-gravity aircraft is used to realise parabolas, allowing to perform twenty-two seconds of weightlessness. Operated by Novespace, subsidiary of CNES, French Space Agency, A310 Zero G is based at Bordeaux Mérignac airport. It also performs scientific flights, recreational flights under the Air Zero G brand, and movie special effects, such as for The Mummy (2017).

=== Differences between variants ===
Below is a list of major differences between the A310 variants.

A310 variant differences
Model	A310-200	A310-300
Maximum payload	32,834 kg (72,387 lb)	37,293 kg (82,217 lb)
MTOW	144,000 kg (317,466 lb)	164,000 kg (361,558 lb)
Engines	JT9D-7R4 / GE CF6-80	JT9D-7R4E1 / PW4000 / CF6-80C2
Range	3,500 nmi (6,500 km; 4,000 mi) (Note: ISA, LRC, JT9D, 237 passengers)	5,150 nmi (9,540 km; 5,930 mi) (Note: ISA, LRC, 240 passengers)

=== Aircraft model designations ===
Type certificate data sheet
Model	Certification date	Engines
A310-203	11 March 1983	GE CF6-80A3
A310-203C	27 November 1984	GE CF6-80A3
A310-204	23 April 1986	GE CF6-80C2A2
A310-221	11 March 1983	PW JT9D-7R4D1
A310-222	22 September 1983	PW JT9D-7R4E1
A310-304	11 March 1986	GE CF6-80C2A2
A310-308	5 June 1991	GE CF6-80C2A8/A2
A310-322	5 December 1985	PW JT9D-7R4E1
A310-324	27 May 1987	PW4152
A310-325	6 March 1992	PW4156A

== Operators ==
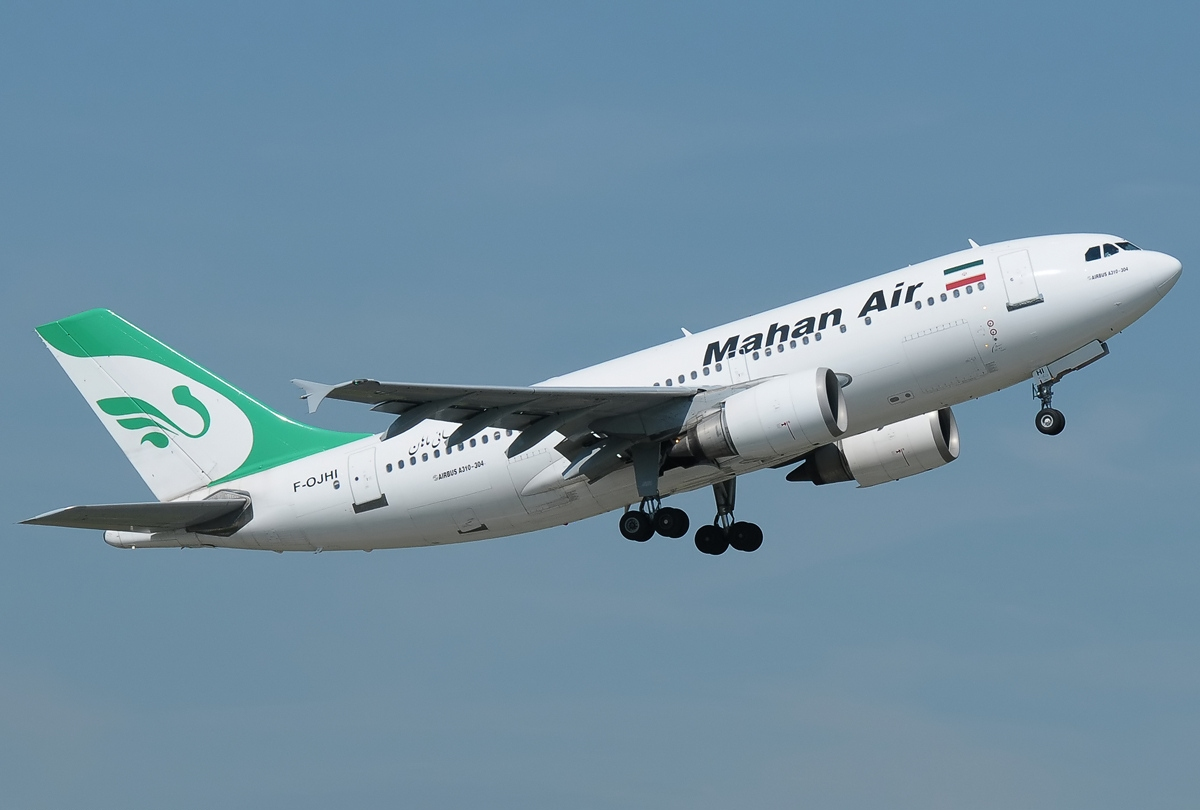
Mahan Air A310-300

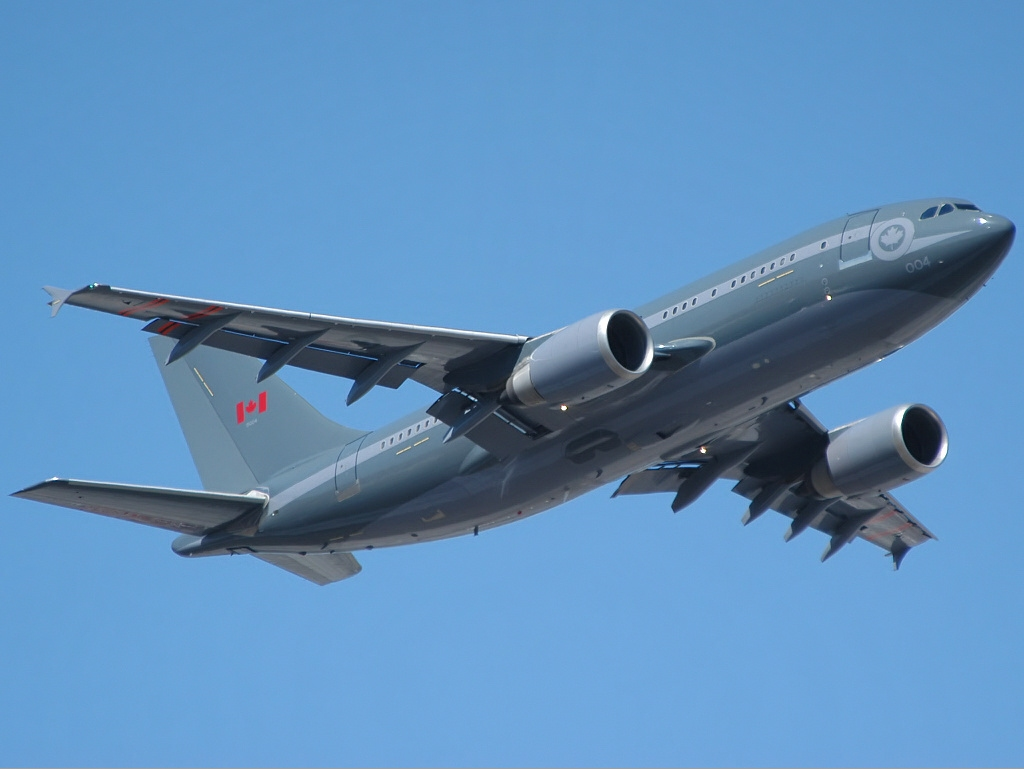
Royal Canadian Air Force CC-150 Polaris

As of April 2025, there are 48 A310 family aircraft in service.

=== Civilian operators ===
As of April 2025, the following airlines are the known remaining civilian operators of A310 aircraft:

- Ariana Afghan Airlines (3)
- AVA Airlines (1)
- Iran Air (1)
- Iran Airtour (2)
- ULS Airlines Cargo (3) – two operated for Turkish Cargo
- Yazd Airways (2)

=== Military operators ===
The A310 is also used by the armed forces of the following countries:

- Royal Canadian Air Force – designated CC-150 Polaris (originally ordered by Wardair and delivered to Canadian Airlines)
- Spanish Air and Space Force

=== Deliveries ===
By the end of production, a total of 255 A310s had been ordered and delivered.

	Total	1998	1997	1996	1995	1994	1993	1992	1991	1990	1989	1988	1987	1986	1985	1984	1983
Deliveries	255	1	2	2	2	2	22	24	19	18	23	28	21	19	26	29	17

== Accidents and incidents ==
As of September 2015 there have been 12 hull-loss accidents involving A310s with a total of 825 fatalities; and 9 hijackings with a total of five fatalities. According to the bar graph on Boeing's Statistical Summary of Commercial Jet Airplane Accidents, the A310 has the highest fatal hull loss rate and second highest total hull loss rate of any widebody commercial airliner, behind the MD-11.

=== Accidents with fatalities ===
- 31 July 1992: Thai Airways International Flight 311, an A310-304 carrying 99 passengers and 14 crew, crashed on approach to Tribhuvan International Airport, Kathmandu. All 113 on board were killed.
- 23 March 1994: Aeroflot Flight 593, an A310-304 carrying 63 passengers and 12 crew, crashed in Siberia after the pilot let his son sit at the controls and the autopilot partially disconnected. All 75 on board were killed.
- 31 March 1995: TAROM Flight 371, an A310-324 carrying 49 passengers and 11 crew, crashed near Otopeni International Airport, Bucharest, Romania after the throttle on the starboard engine jammed with no subsequent resolution by the pilots, at the same time as the captain suffered a medical crisis. All 60 on board were killed.
- 11 December 1998: Thai Airways International Flight 261 crashed near Surat Thani Airport in Thailand. There were 101 fatalities and 45 people survived with serious injuries.
- 30 January 2000: Kenya Airways Flight 431, an A310-300 crashed in the Atlantic Ocean shortly after takeoff from Abidjan in Côte d'Ivoire. 169 passengers and crew were killed and 10 passengers survived with serious injuries. This is the deadliest aviation accident involving the Airbus A310.
- 9 July 2006: S7 Airlines Flight 778, an Airbus A310-324 from Moscow carrying 196 passengers and eight crew, overshot the runway at Irkutsk in Siberia, plowed through a concrete barrier and caught fire as it crashed into buildings. Reports said that 70 of the 204 on board survived, with 12 of them missing. Since the accident, casualty figures have fluctuated, in part due to three people boarding the aircraft who were not on the passenger manifest, and some survivors walking home after being assumed trapped in the wreckage.
- 10 June 2008: Sudan Airways Flight 109, an A310-324 from Amman, Jordan carrying 203 passengers and 11 crew, ran off the runway while landing at Khartoum International Airport during bad weather. Soon afterward a fire started in the aircraft's right wing area. A total of 30 people were killed.
- 30 June 2009, Yemenia Flight 626, an A310-324, flying from Sanaa, Yemen, to Moroni, Comoros crashed into the Indian Ocean shortly before reaching its destination. The aircraft was carrying 153 passengers and crew; there was one survivor, a 14-year-old girl.
- 24 June 2014, Pakistan International Airlines Flight 756, an Airbus A310-324ET, flying from King Khalid International Airport, Riyadh, Saudi Arabia to Bacha Khan International Airport, Peshawar, Pakistan, was hit by ground gun fire killing one female and injuring two flight attendants.
- On 24 December 2015, at 08:35, an Airbus A310-304F cargo aircraft, registration 9Q-CVH, operated by Congolese company Services Air on a domestic flight, ran off the end of the runway and crashed in a residential area while landing at Mbuji-Mayi Airport in the city of Mbuji-Mayi, the capital of Kasai-Oriental province in the Democratic Republic of Congo. Eight people were killed and nine others were injured.

=== Hijackings ===
- 3 December 1984: Kuwait Airways Flight 221, registration 9K-AHC, departed from Kuwait City, Kuwait, to Karachi, Pakistan, via Dubai, United Arab Emirates, was hijacked by four armed Lebanese Shia militants, reportedly affiliated with the Hezbollah movement. After 6 days, the Iranian Revolutionary Guard forces stormed the aircraft and freed the remaining hostages.
- 26 March 1991: Singapore Airlines Flight 117, registration 9V-STP, carrying 123 passengers and crew, was hijacked by 4 male Pakistanis en route to Singapore. The aircraft landed at Singapore safely where the Singapore Armed Forces Commando Formation stormed it and killed the hijackers. Two occupants were injured during the process.
- 4 September 1992: Vietnam Airlines Flight 850, registration LZ-JXB, leased from Jes Air, with 127 occupants on board en route from Bangkok to Ho Chi Minh City, hijacked by Ly Tong, a former pilot in the Republic of Vietnam Air Force. He then dropped anti-communist leaflets over Ho Chi Minh City before parachuting out. Vietnamese security forces later arrested him on the ground. The aircraft landed safely, and no one on board was injured. Tong was incarcerated in a Hanoi prison, where he remained until 1998.
- On 11 February 1993, Lufthansa Flight 592, registration D-AIDM from Frankfurt to Addis Ababa via Cairo with 94 passengers and 10 crew members was hijacked during the first leg by 20-year-old Nebiu Zewolde Demeke, who forced the pilots to divert to the United States, with the intent of securing the right of asylum there. Demeke, who had been on the flight to be deported back to his native Ethiopia, surrendered to authorities upon arrival at John F. Kennedy International Airport in New York City. No passengers or crew members were harmed during the 12-hour ordeal.
- 25 October 1993, Nigeria Airways Flight 470 was hijacked en route from Lagos to Abuja. The hijackers demanded the resignation of Nigeria's government and to be flown to Frankfurt. The aircraft was denied permission to land in N'Djamena, and was diverted to the Niamey Airport for refuelling. It was stormed by Niger National Gendarmerie four days later; the co-pilot was killed during the operation.

=== Other incidents ===
- On 11 February 1991, an Interflug flight from Berlin to Moscow was involved in a go-around incident at Sheremetyevo International Airport. The captain of the A310 (registered D-AOAC) disagreed with the flight computer settings for the go-around, and the resulting opposite control inputs from the flight computer caused a total of four stalls, including one that pitched the aircraft up to 88 degrees (nearly vertical). The pilots eventually recovered control and landed the aircraft.
- On 24 September 1994, TAROM Flight 381, an Airbus A310 registered YR-LCA flying from Bucharest to Paris Orly, went into a sudden and uncommanded nose-up position and stalled. The crew attempted to countermand the aircraft's flight control system but were unable to get the nose down while remaining on course. Witnesses saw the aircraft climb with an extreme nose-up attitude, then bank sharply left, then right, then fall into a steep dive. Only when the dive produced additional speed was the crew able to recover steady flight. An investigation found that an overshoot of flap placard speed during the approach, incorrectly commanded by the captain, caused a mode transition to flight level change. The auto-throttles increased power and trim went full nose-up as a result. The crew's attempt at commanding the nose-down elevator could not counteract the effect of stabilizer nose-up trim, and the resulting dive brought the aircraft from a height of 4,100 feet (1,200 m) at the time of the stall to 800 feet (240 m) when the crew was able to recover command. The aircraft landed safely after a second approach. There were 186 people on board.
- 12 July 2000: Hapag-Lloyd Flight 3378, an A310-304, crashed during an emergency landing near Vienna in Austria due to fuel exhaustion. All 143 passengers and 8 crew on board survived.
- 6 March 2005: Air Transat Flight 961, an Airbus A310-308, en route from Cuba to Quebec City with nine crew and 261 passengers on board, experienced a structural failure in which the rudder detached in flight. The A310 experienced a sudden jolt and started to yaw and roll while gaining altitude, but the crew were able to regain control of their aircraft by descending. The aircraft returned to Varadero, Cuba, where they made a safe landing. The crew made no unusual rudder inputs during the flight nor was the rudder being manipulated when it failed; there was no obvious fault in the rudder or yaw-damper system. Subsequent investigation determined that Airbus's inspection procedure for the composite rudder was inadequate; inspection procedures for composite structures on airliners were changed following this accident.
- 23 February 2006: A Mahan Air Airbus A310 operating a flight from Tehran, Iran, was involved in a serious incident while on approach to Birmingham International Airport. The aircraft descended to the published minimum descent altitude of 740 feet (230 m) despite still being 11 nautical miles (20 km; 13 mi) from the runway threshold. At a point 6 nm from the runway the aircraft had descended to an altitude of 660 feet (200 m), which was 164 feet (50 m) above ground level. Having noticed the descent profile, Birmingham air traffic control issued an immediate climb instruction to the aircraft, however, the crew had already commenced a missed approach, having received a GPWS alert. The aircraft was radar vectored for a second approach during which the flight crew again initiated an early descent. On this occasion, the radar controller instructed the crew to maintain their altitude and the crew completed the approach to a safe landing. The accident investigation determined that the primary cause was the use of the incorrect DME for the approach, combined with a substantial breakdown in the Crew Resource Management. Three safety recommendations were made.
- 12 March 2007: Biman Bangladesh Airlines Flight 006, an A310-325 carrying 250 passengers and crew, suffered a collapsed nose gear during its takeoff run. There were no fatalities in the accident at Dubai International Airport. The aircraft came to rest at the end of the runway and was evacuated, but blocked the only active runway and forced the airport to close for nearly eight hours. The aircraft was written off.
- 24 December 2015: A Mahan Air Airbus A310-300 operating a flight from Tehran (Iran) to Istanbul (Turkey) failed to stop at its stand at Istanbul's Atatürk Airport, instead colliding with a concrete barrier and bus. The aircraft, registration EP-MNP, sustained substantial damage but was repaired and returned to service a year later. Another A310 crashed the same day and year.
- 19 July 2023: a CC150 Polaris and crew were tasked to repatriate personnel and equipment from Exercise Mobility Guardian 23, a multinational Air Mobility exercise led by the United States at Anderson Air Force Base in Guam. The aircraft, operating under callsign Can Force 3149 (CFC3149), arrived in Guam at approximately 2145 Local Time on 21 Jul 23 and was directed to parking by United States Air Force personnel. After shutting down, the crew carried out post flight checks as well as loading the aircraft with baggage and equipment for the return flight the following day. After completing their duties, the crew departed for the hotel at approximately 2300 Local Time. At approximately 1030 Local Time on 22 Jul 23, the unattended aircraft rolled backwards, followed a curved trajectory, and impacted a French Air and Space Force Airbus A400M parked on an adjacent spot. The impact resulted in serious damage to both aircraft, but no injuries. The investigation revealed the aircraft to be serviceable prior to the accident. A lack of installed chocks allowed the aircraft to roll from its position after the parking brake reached its designed holding period of 12 hours. Expectation bias, crew fatigue and checklist design contributed to chocks not being installed as well as the crew not detecting the lack of chocks prior to leaving the aircraft. The investigation recommends changes to checklists, availability of fatigue prediction software for planning, and a review of the Fatigue Assessment Report.

== Preserved aircraft ==
=== Currently preserved ===
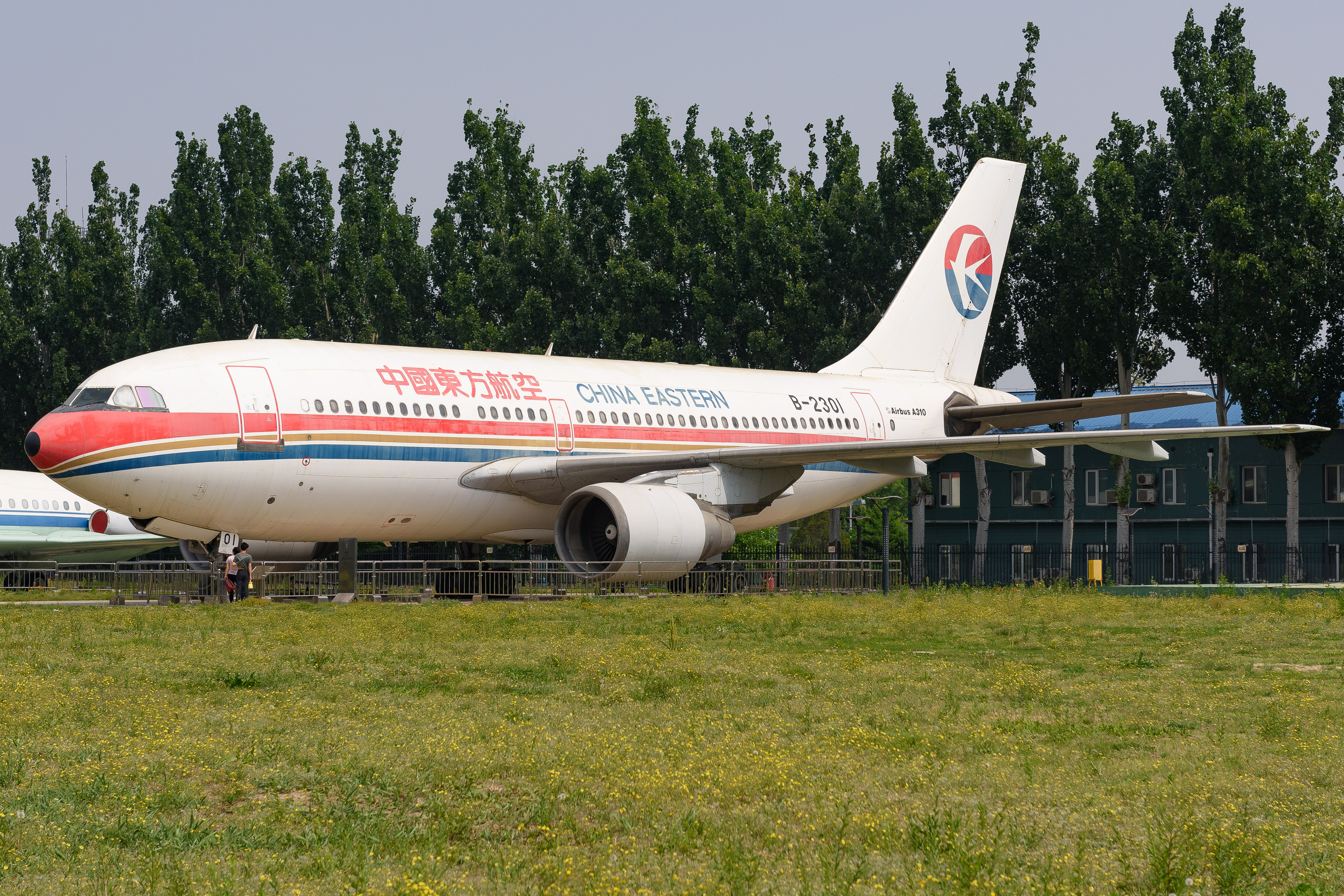
The first Airbus delivered in China was this A310, to China Eastern Airlines in 1985, retired in 2006 and displayed at the Beijing Civil Aviation Museum.

Nine A310 aircraft have been preserved, with one scrapped after preservation:

- ex-China Eastern Airlines A310-222 B-2301, preserved at the China Civil Aviation Museum near Beijing Capital International Airport
- ex-Jordan Aviation A310-222 JY-JAV "Zuhair", preserved at the Al Haram Pyramid restaurant in Aydoun, Jordan
- ex-PC-Air A310-222 HS-PCC "Klamkomol", used as instructional airframe at Rajamangala University of Technology Thanyaburi in Pathum Thani, Thailand
- ex-Air India A310-304 VT-EJK "Gomati", preserved as Runway 1 Restaurant at the Adventure Island, Rohini in New Delhi, India
- ex-Turkish Airlines TC-JCZ "Ergene", preserved at the "Oğuzhan Özkaya" Educational institution in Izmir, Turkey
- ex-Luftwaffe 10+23 "Kurt Schumacher", to be preserved as restaurant at Serengeti Park in Hodenhagen, Germany
- ex-Pakistan International Airlines AP-BEQ preserved at Leipzig/Halle Airport
- ex-Royal Canadian Air Force CC-150 Polaris 15001, retired in 2025 and preserved at the National Air Force Museum of Canada

=== Formerly preserved, scrapped during preservation ===
- ex-Nigeria Airways A310-222 5N-AUG was the Italian restaurant All Italia in Gilly, about 5 km south of Brussels Charleroi Airport. It was destroyed in a fire on 17 November 2020.

== Specifications (A310-325) ==
Data from

General characteristics

- Crew: 2
- Capacity: 243 passengers, 112.2 m^{3} (3,962 cu ft) cargo volume
- Length: 46.66 m (153 ft 1 in)
- Wingspan: 43.90 m (144 ft 0.3 in)
- Width: 5.640 m (18 ft 6 in)
- Height: 15.867 m (52 ft 0.7 in) at operating empty weight
- Wing area: 219.00 m^{2} (2,357.3 sq ft)
- Empty weight: 79,166 kg (174,528 lb)
- Max takeoff weight: 164,000 kg (361,557 lb)
- Fuel capacity: 61,070 L (16,132 US gal), 47,940 kg (105,689 lb) usable fuel
- Powerplant: 2 × Pratt & Whitney PW4156A high bypass turbofan, 249.08 kN (56,000 lbf) thrust each

Performance

- Maximum speed: Mach 0.84
- Range: 9,540 km (5,930 mi, 5,150 nmi)
- Service ceiling: 12,530 m (41,100 ft)

== See also ==
- Competition between Airbus and Boeing

Related development

- Airbus A300
- Airbus A310 MRTT
- Airbus A330
- Airbus A340
- CC-150 Polaris

Aircraft of comparable role, configuration, and era

- Boeing 767
- Lockheed L-1011 TriStar 500

Related lists

- List of jet airliners

== Sources ==
- Chillon, Jacques; Dubois, Jean-Pierre & Wegg, John (1980). French Post-War Transport Aircraft. Tonbridge, UK: Air-Britain. ISBN 0-85130-078-2.
- Endres, Günter (Spring 2004). "Classic Airliner: Airbus A300". Flightpath: The International Journal of Commercial Aviation. 3. Norwalk, Connecticut, USA: AIRtime Publishing: 36–85. ISBN 1-880588-73-0.
- Gunston, Bill (February 2010). Airbus: The Complete Story. Sparkford, Yeovil, Somerset, UK: Haynes Publishing, 2009. ISBN 978-1-84425-585-6.
- Norris, Guy and Mark Wagner (1999). Airbus. St. Paul, Minnesota: MBI Publishing, 1999. ISBN 0-7603-0677-X.
- Pitt, Ivan L. and John Randolph Norsworthy. Economics of the U.S. Commercial Airline Industry: Productivity, Technology and Deregulation. "Springer", 2012. ISBN 1-4615-5031-9.
- Senguttuvan, P. S. Fundamentals of Air Transport Management. "Excel Books India", 2006. ISBN 81-7446-459-X.
- Simons, Graham. The Airbus A380: A History. "Pen and Sword", 2014. ISBN 1-78303-041-0.
- "World Airliner Census". Flight International, Volume 184, Number 5403, 13–19 August 2013, pp. 40–58.
