= Balkumari, Bhaktapur =

Balkumari बालकुमारी
- Village Development Committee
- Country: Nepal
- Zone: Bagmati Zone
- District: Dupcheshwor Rural municipality Nuwakot District

Population (1991)
  - Total: 8,790
  - Religions: Hindu
- Time zone: UTC+5:45 (Nepal Time)

Balkumari (Nepali: बालकुमारी is a village and Village Development Committee in Nuwakot District in the Bagmati Zone of central Nepal. At the time of the 1991 Nepal census it had a population of 8,790 with 1,349 houses.
