= Shikharbesi =

Shikharbesi शिखरबेसी
- Village development committee
- Location in Nepal
- Coordinates: 27.99°N 85.39°E
- Country: Nepal
- Zone: Bagmati Zone
- District: Nuwakot District

Population (1991)
  - Total: 3,080
- Time zone: UTC+5:45 (Nepal Time)

Shikharbesi is a village development committee in Nuwakot District in the Bagmati Zone of central Nepal. At the time of the 1991 Nepal census it had a population of 3080 people living in 629 individual households.
