= Samundratar =

Coordinates: 27°56′N 85°23′E

Samundratar समुद्रटार
- Village development committee
- Interactive map of Samundratar
- Country: Nepal
- Zone: Bagmati Zone
- District: Nuwakot District

Population (1991)
  - Total: 1,859
- Time zone: UTC+5:45 (Nepal Time)

Samundratar is a village development committee in Nuwakot District in the Bagmati Zone of central Nepal. At the time of the 1991 Nepal census it had a population of 1859 people living in 364 individual households.
