= Turkish Cargo =

Cargo division of Turkish Airlines

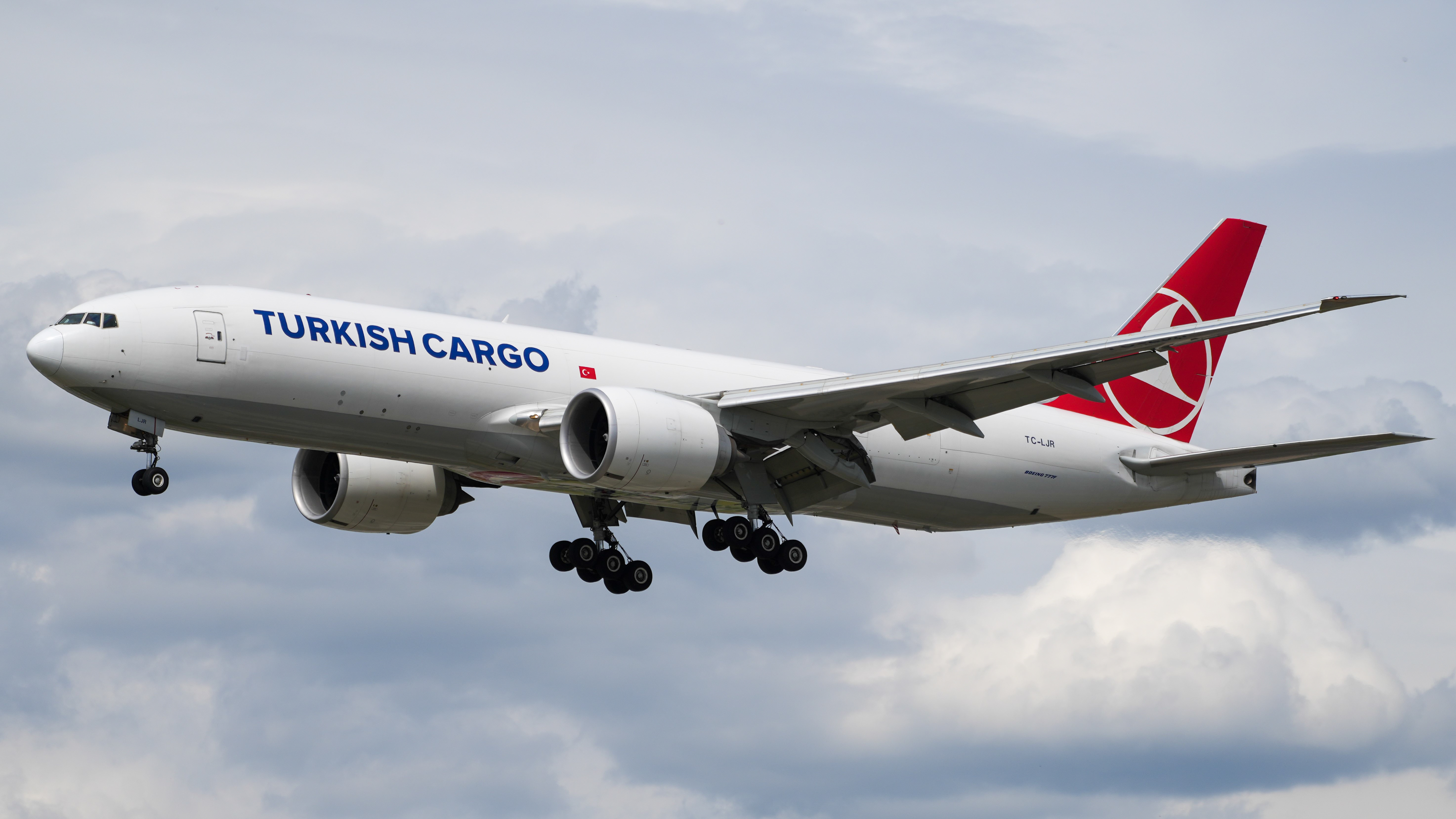
- Boeing 777F
IATA	ICAO	Call sign
TK	THY	TURKAIR
- Founded: 1933 (as state Airlines;
- Commenced operations: 2000
- Hubs: Istanbul Airport
- Fleet size: 19 freighters (plus belly capacity on Turkish Airlines' passenger fleet)
- Parent company: Turkish Airlines
- Headquarters: Istanbul, Turkey
- Key people: Ali Türk (Chief Cargo Officer)

Turkish Cargo is the air cargo division of Turkish Airlines, the flag carrier of Turkey. It operates scheduled freighter services and uses the belly-hold capacity of the parent airline's passenger fleet, with its main hub at the Istanbul Airport (IST) cargo terminal known as SMARTIST. In 2024 it was ranked third among the world's air cargo carriers, with a 5.7 percent share of global freight tonne-kilometres (FTK) and approximately 9.9 billion FTKs flown, according to the International Air Transport Association.

== History ==
=== Early cargo operations (1933–2000) ===
Turkish Airlines was established on 20 May 1933 as State Airlines (Devlet Hava Yolları), a department of the Turkish Ministry of National Defense. Cargo had been carried on its aircraft since that inaugural year, and the carrier transported its first international cargo consignments during the 1930s as mail and documents aboard passenger services.

=== Brand formation and dedicated freighters (2000–2017) ===
In 2000, as part of a broader restructuring of Turkish Airlines, the carrier's cargo activities were consolidated under the Turkish Cargo brand, which expanded the product to scheduled cargo flights and a complementary trucking network. The division's freighter fleet in the 2010s was built around Airbus A310-300F, Airbus A330-200F and, briefly, Boeing 747-400F aircraft. The first Boeing 777F entered the fleet in December 2017, followed by additional 777F orders in 2018 as Turkish Cargo pursued a strategy of replacing older and smaller freighters with widebodies.

=== Move to Istanbul Airport and SMARTIST (2018–2022) ===
When Istanbul's new Istanbul Airport opened in 2019, passenger services from Istanbul Atatürk Airport were transferred to the new airfield, while Turkish Cargo temporarily continued freighter operations from Atatürk. This created a "dual-hub" operation that, according to the company's then-chief cargo officer, performed some 30,000 flights and moved over four million tonnes of cargo between 2019 and early 2022.

In February 2022 all Turkish Cargo operations were relocated to the purpose-built SMARTIST terminal at Istanbul Airport, consolidating passenger-belly and freighter flows at a single site. The new facility was designed for an annual throughput of about 2.2 million tonnes of cargo in its first phase, using automated storage and retrieval systems (ASRS), a robotic ULD storage system, and other process-automation technology.

=== Recent growth (2022–present) ===
Turkish Cargo rose rapidly in the global rankings during the 2020s. It reported that it had ranked fifth among the world's top 25 cargo carriers in early 2020, from eighth a year earlier, with a 4.4 percent share of global FTK. For 2024, industry reporting placed Turkish Cargo third globally by carried FTK, behind Qatar Airways Cargo and Emirates SkyCargo, with roughly 10.24 billion CTK recorded in IATA's World Air Transport Statistics.

In December 2023, Turkish Airlines announced a firm order for five Airbus A350F freighters with purchase rights for five more, as part of a wider deal with Airbus. In 2024 the carrier also contracted to increase its Boeing 777F fleet to twelve aircraft, ordering four additional 777Fs for delivery through 2026.

In January 2026, parent Turkish Airlines announced a second phase of the SMARTIST terminal, set to raise the facility's annual handling capacity from 2.2 to 4.5 million tonnes upon gradual completion in 2027–2028, together with a dedicated e-commerce complex due to open in 2026. The programme forms part of a wider infrastructure investment exceeding 100 billion Turkish lira.

== Operations ==
=== Hub and destinations ===
Turkish Cargo's main base is the SMARTIST cargo terminal at Istanbul Airport. According to industry reporting at end-2024, Turkish Cargo operated flights to 369 destinations across 133 countries, using a combination of dedicated freighter services and passenger-belly capacity. Destination and country counts fluctuate with network changes and depend on whether figures count passenger-belly destinations, freighter-only destinations, or dedicated cargo destinations.

=== Business segments ===
The carrier handles general air cargo along with specialised traffic including pharmaceuticals, perishables, live animals, valuables, dangerous goods and project cargo. Its SMARTIST terminal holds IATA Smart Facility Operational Capacity (SFOC) certification, covering compliance with IATA's Cargo Handling Manual, Dangerous Goods Regulations, ULD Regulations, Temperature Control Regulations, Live Animals Regulations and Perishable Cargo Regulations. The facility includes temperature-controlled zones, a dedicated pharmaceutical area, and designated handling areas for hazardous and radioactive materials.

=== SMARTIST terminal ===
The first phase of SMARTIST, opened in February 2022, occupies about 205,000 m² and is rated at an annual capacity of around 2.2 million tonnes. Around 1,500 cargo operations are handled daily, supported by roughly 17,000 bulk-cargo positions and about 2,000 unit load device positions. A planned second phase, due to be delivered progressively in 2027–2028, is intended to extend the footprint to around 340,000 m² and raise annual capacity to 4.5 million tonnes.

== Fleet ==
=== Current freighter fleet ===
According to fleet trackers and industry press, as of late 2025 Turkish Cargo operated a dedicated freighter fleet of ten Airbus A330-200F and nine Boeing 777F aircraft, supplemented by the belly capacity of parent Turkish Airlines' widebody and narrowbody passenger fleet. Wet-leased freighters (principally Airbus A310-300F and Airbus A321-200F aircraft) have also been used intermittently to supplement capacity.

Turkish Cargo freighter fleet (as reported, late 2025)
Aircraft	In service	Orders	Notes
Airbus A330-200F	10	—	
Airbus A350F	—	5	Deliveries expected from 2027
Boeing 777F	9	3	Fleet to reach 12 aircraft by mid-2026
Total	19	8	

=== Retired freighters ===
Turkish Cargo has previously operated the Airbus A310-300F, Airbus A300-600F and Boeing 747-400F on its own or under wet-lease arrangements, but had phased these out in favour of the A330-200F and 777F by the mid-2020s.

== Awards and recognition ==
Turkish Cargo was named "Cargo Airline of the Year – Global" at the 2025 World Air Cargo Awards, held during Air Cargo Europe in Munich on 3 June 2025; the awards are organised by the trade publication Air Cargo Week. The carrier was earlier named "Fastest-Growing International Cargo Airline of the Year" at the 2025 STAT Times International Air Cargo Excellence Awards, presented at Air Cargo Africa in Nairobi in February 2025.

== See also ==
- Turkish Airlines
- Turkish Airlines fleet
- Istanbul Airport
- Cargo airline
