= Beteni =

Beteni बेतिनी
- Village development committee
- Location in Nepal
- Coordinates: 28°22′N 81°53′E
- Country: Nepal
- Zone: Bagmati Zone
- District: Nuwakot District

Population (1991)
  - Total: 3,399
- Time zone: UTC+5:45 (Nepal Time)

Beteni is a village development committee in Nuwakot District in the Bagmati Zone of central Nepal. At the time of the 1991 Nepal census it had a population of 3399 living in 657 individual households.
