= Gaunkharka, Nuwakot =

Gaunkharka गाउँखर्क
- Village development committee
- Location in Nepal
- Coordinates: 27.94°N 85.45°E
- Country: Nepal
- Zone: Bagmati Zone
- District: Nuwakot District

Population (1991)
  - Total: 2,949
- Time zone: UTC+5:45 (Nepal Time)

Gaunkharka is a village development committee in Nuwakot District in the Bagmati Zone of central Nepal. At the time of the 1991 Nepal census it had a population of 2949 living in 505 individual households.
