= Ly Tong =

Vietnamese American anti-communist activist (1946–2019)

Lê Văn Tống
- Born: September 1, 1945; An Cựu Đông village, Thừa Thiên Province, French Indochina (now Thừa Thiên Huế Province, Vietnam)
- Died: April 5, 2019 (aged 72); San Diego, California, U.S.
- Military career
- Allegiance: South Vietnam; United States
- Branch: Republic of Vietnam Air Force
- Service years: 1965-1975
- Units: "Black Eagle" Fighter Squadron; No. 548 Squadron
- Conflicts: Vietnam War

Lê Văn Tống (September 1, 1945 – April 5, 2019), known as Lý Tống, was a South Vietnamese air force pilot who became a Vietnamese American anti-communist activist. After escaping from a Vietnamese re-education camp in 1980, he made his way to the United States, where he was given asylum. He became known as the "Vietnamese James Bond" for a series of flights in which he dropped anti-communist leaflets over Ho Chi Minh City in 1992 and 2000, and over Havana in 2000. He spent about six years in prison in Vietnam and about five and a half years in custody in Thailand as a result of these flights.

== Early life ==
Lý Tống was born on September 1, 1945, in Huế. His father was a farmer and resistance leader who was killed during the First Indochina War against the French when Lý Tống was two years old. His mother, who married three times, died in 1979.

== Military career ==
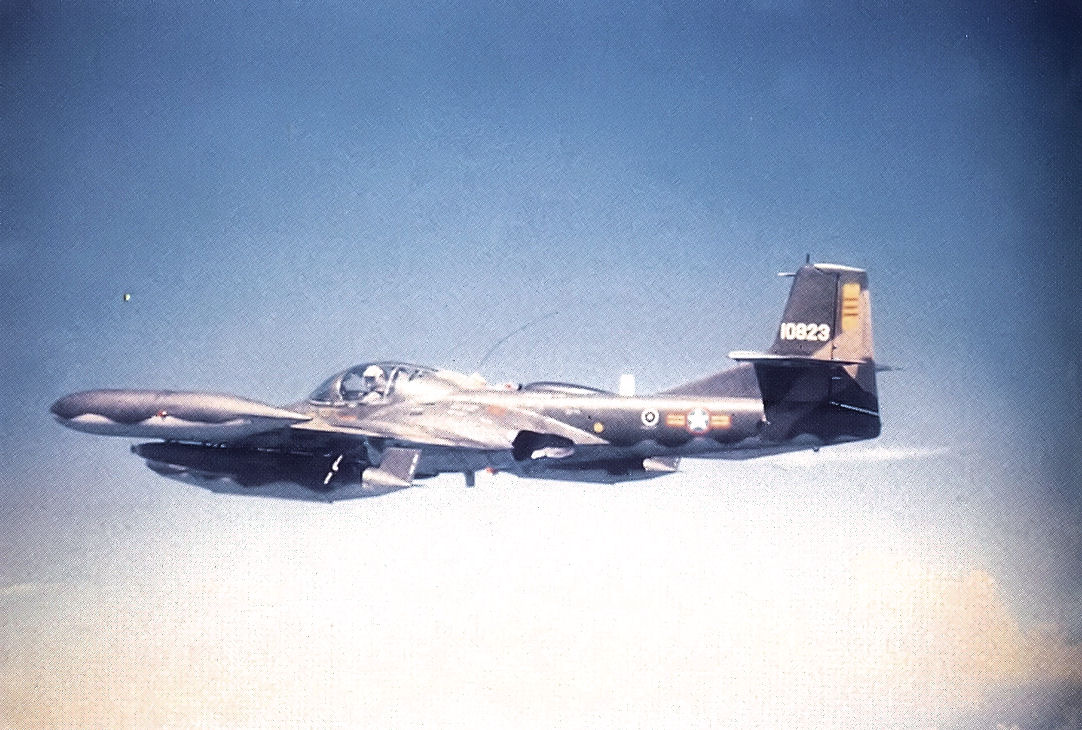
South Vietnamese A-37B Dragonfly

Lý Tống joined the Republic of Vietnam Air Force, and he was trained partly in the United States. He served in the air force's elite "Black Eagle" fighter squadron. In January 1970, he was assigned to the "Black Eagle" Fighter Squadron of the 4th Air Division in Cần Thơ, where he trained to fly the Cessna U-17 and the A-37 Dragonfly. During this time, he fought mainly in the Cambodian campaign and in the south-western region of Vietnam. In early 1973, he was transferred to the 548th Squadron in Phan Rang. He flew A-37 bombing, reconnaissance and forward air control missions, mainly over the Central Highlands.

=== Imprisonment and escape ===
Shortly before the end of the war, his A-37 was shot down near Nha Trang. In April 1975, the city of Saigon was captured by the North Vietnamese Army, which marked the end of the Vietnam War and the fall of South Vietnam. Lý Tống was held in communist prisons and re-education camps, where, according to Radio Free Asia, he was tortured and kept in solitary confinement in a shipping container.

In August 1980, he escaped from a re-education camp near Tuy Hòa and fled to Ho Chi Minh City, where he lived illegally and obtained forged identity documents. He then began a 17-month journey through Cambodia, Thailand and Malaysia, traveling by bicycle, bus, train and on foot. He eventually swam across the Johor Strait at night to Singapore, took a taxi to the United States Embassy and requested political asylum.

== Life in the United States ==
In 1984, Lý Tống was granted asylum in the United States, and he received a letter from President Ronald Reagan commending him for his struggle to escape from Vietnam. He later became a US citizen. He worked as a security guard while he earned bachelor's and master's degrees in political science at the University of New Orleans. According to Radio Free Asia, the historian Stephen E. Ambrose encouraged him to study military history. He wrote an autobiography, Black Eagle, in Vietnamese. The Vietnamese newspaper Pháp Luật later alleged that he had been unemployed in the United States and had made a living through insurance fraud.

== Anti-communist flights ==
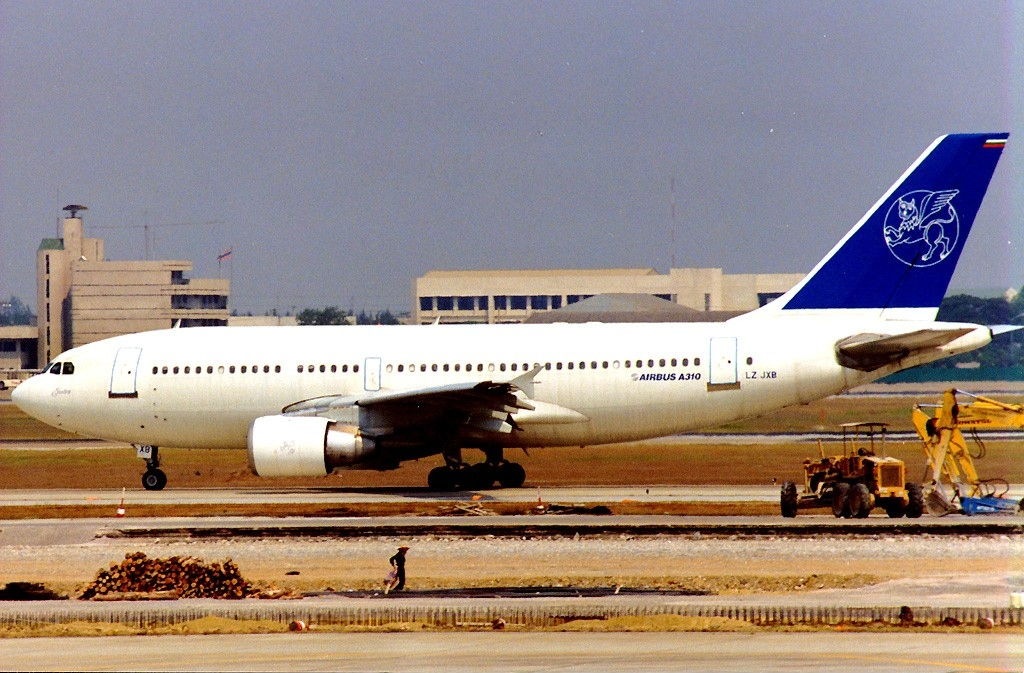
Vietnam Airlines Airbus A310-222, registration LZ-JXB, the aircraft of Flight 850, hijacked by Lý Tống in 1992

=== 1992 hijacking ===
On September 4, 1992, Lý Tống hijacked a Vietnam Airlines flight from Bangkok to Ho Chi Minh City. Near the city, he took a flight attendant hostage with a rope, falsely claimed to have a bomb, and forced the pilot to fly low over Ho Chi Minh City. He threw out about 50,000 leaflets calling for an uprising against the communist government, climbed out through the cockpit window and parachuted into Vietnam. No one aboard the aircraft was harmed. He landed in a swamp, was captured by the authorities within hours, and was later sentenced to 20 years in prison.

In September 1998, he was released as part of an amnesty for Vietnam's National Day, along with thousands of other prisoners. In November 1998, he returned to the United States for a speaking tour of Vietnamese communities, from Orange County, California, to New York. He described himself as "a freedom fighter", not a terrorist, and the editor of the newspaper Người Việt, Yến Đỗ, called him "both a hero and, at the same time, a troublemaker".

=== Cuba ===
On January 1, 2000, Lý Tống flew a rented Cessna 172 from Florida to Havana, Cuba, and dropped leaflets encouraging the Cuban people to rise up against the government of Fidel Castro. Two Cuban MiG fighters were scrambled to meet the plane, and a US F-16 took off from Homestead Air Force Base. On his return to Kendall–Tamiami Executive Airport, he was detained and questioned by US immigration officials, but he was released without charge. The Federal Aviation Administration suspended his pilot's license. In Miami, he was hailed as a hero by some Cuban Americans, and he was invited to ride in Little Havana's Three Kings Day Parade. José Basulto, the leader of the exile group Brothers to the Rescue, nominated him for the group's honorary wings.

=== 2000 flight over Vietnam and imprisonment in Thailand ===
On November 17, 2000, Lý Tống and a co-pilot took off in Thailand in a Partenavia P.68C, registration HS-TCL, owned by the Civil Aviation Training Center of Thailand, and flew to Ho Chi Minh City. There, he dropped more than 50,000 leaflets calling for an uprising against the communist government. The flight coincided with a visit to Vietnam by US President Bill Clinton. He was arrested on his return to Thailand. He said that he had not used force, and that he had offered the pilot money to give up control of the plane. He was convicted of hijacking and sentenced to seven years in prison.

In December 2004, the Vietnamese government asked Thailand to extradite him, accusing him of slandering the government of Vietnam and violating the country's airspace. In May 2006, he was released from prison, but he was arrested again at the prison gate pending the extradition hearing. In September 2006, a Thai lower court ruled that he should be extradited. On April 3, 2007, a Thai appeals court overturned the decision, ruling that his act was a political offense rather than a criminal one, and he was freed after five and a half years in Thai custody.

=== Attempted flight over North Korea ===
On August 26, 2008, Lý Tống rented a plane and pilot in South Korea and told the pilot to fly over North Korea so that he could drop anti-communist leaflets there. The pilot said that they had to return to Seoul for fuel, while sending a hijacking alert, and Lý Tống was briefly detained after landing.

== Later activism ==
In February and March 2008, he conducted a hunger strike at San Jose City Hall, protesting against efforts by the city councilwoman Madison Nguyen to name a district of the city "Saigon Business District" instead of "Little Saigon".

In July 2010, he was arrested for a pepper spray attack on the Vietnamese singer Đàm Vĩnh Hưng at a concert at the Santa Clara Convention Center in Santa Clara, California. Lý Tống accused the singer of being a communist agent. Disguised as a woman, he approached the singer on stage as if to offer him a flower, and then sprayed him in the face. He was charged with six offenses. On May 24, 2012, a jury convicted him of two misdemeanors, simple assault and resisting arrest, and two felonies, using tear gas and second-degree burglary with intent to commit a felony. On June 22, 2012, he was sentenced to six months in jail and three years of probation.

== Death ==
Lý Tống died of lung disease at 9:16 p.m. on April 5, 2019, at Sharp Memorial Hospital in San Diego, at the age of 73. He was survived by three daughters, a half-brother and a half-sister. Hundreds of mourners from the Vietnamese American community attended a public viewing in Westminster, California, and he was buried at Westminster Memorial Park.
