= Ghyangphedi =

Ghyangphedi घ्याङ्गफेदी
- Village development committee
- Location in Nepal
- Coordinates: 28.01°N 85.45°E
- Country: Nepal
- Zone: Bagmati Zone
- District: Nuwakot District

Population (1991)
  - Total: 2,789
- Time zone: UTC+5:45 (Nepal Time)

Ghyangphedi is a village development committee in Nuwakot District in the Bagmati Zone of central Nepal. At the time of the 1991 Nepal census it had a population of 2789. 90% of the population is Tamang and 10% is Sherpa, etc. The village is surrounded by mountains with only a few mountains can be seen from Gos, a pilgrimage site of Hinduism.
