= Kakani Rural Municipality =

Kakani ककनी
- Gaupalika
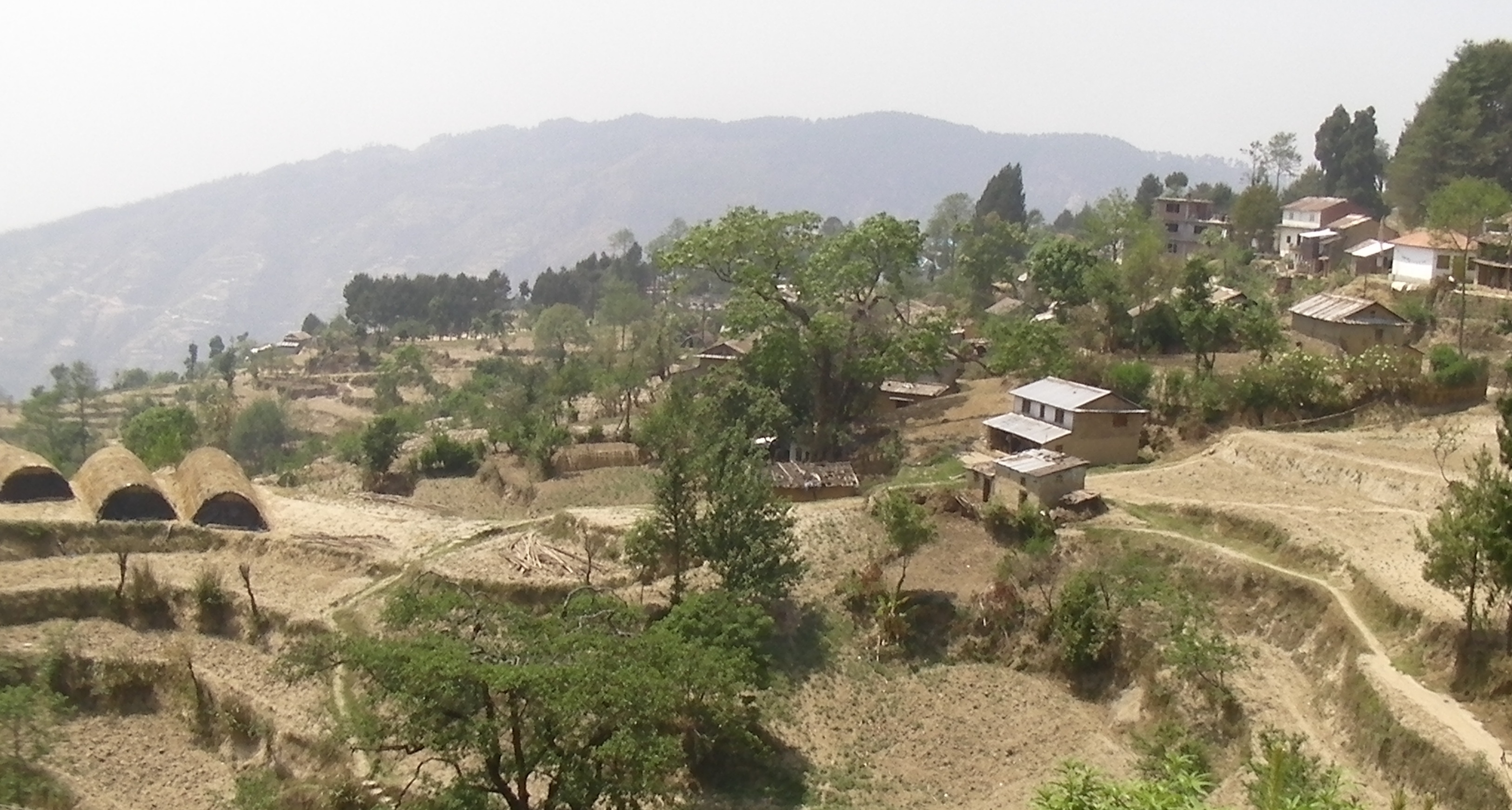

- Location in Nepal
- Coordinates: 27°49′N 85°16′E
- Country: Nepal
- Zone: Bagmati Province
- District: Nuwakot District
- Elevation: 2,030 m (6,660 ft)

Population (1991)
  - Total: 7,816
- Time zone: UTC+5:45 (Nepal Time)
- Website: http://kakanimun.gov.np/

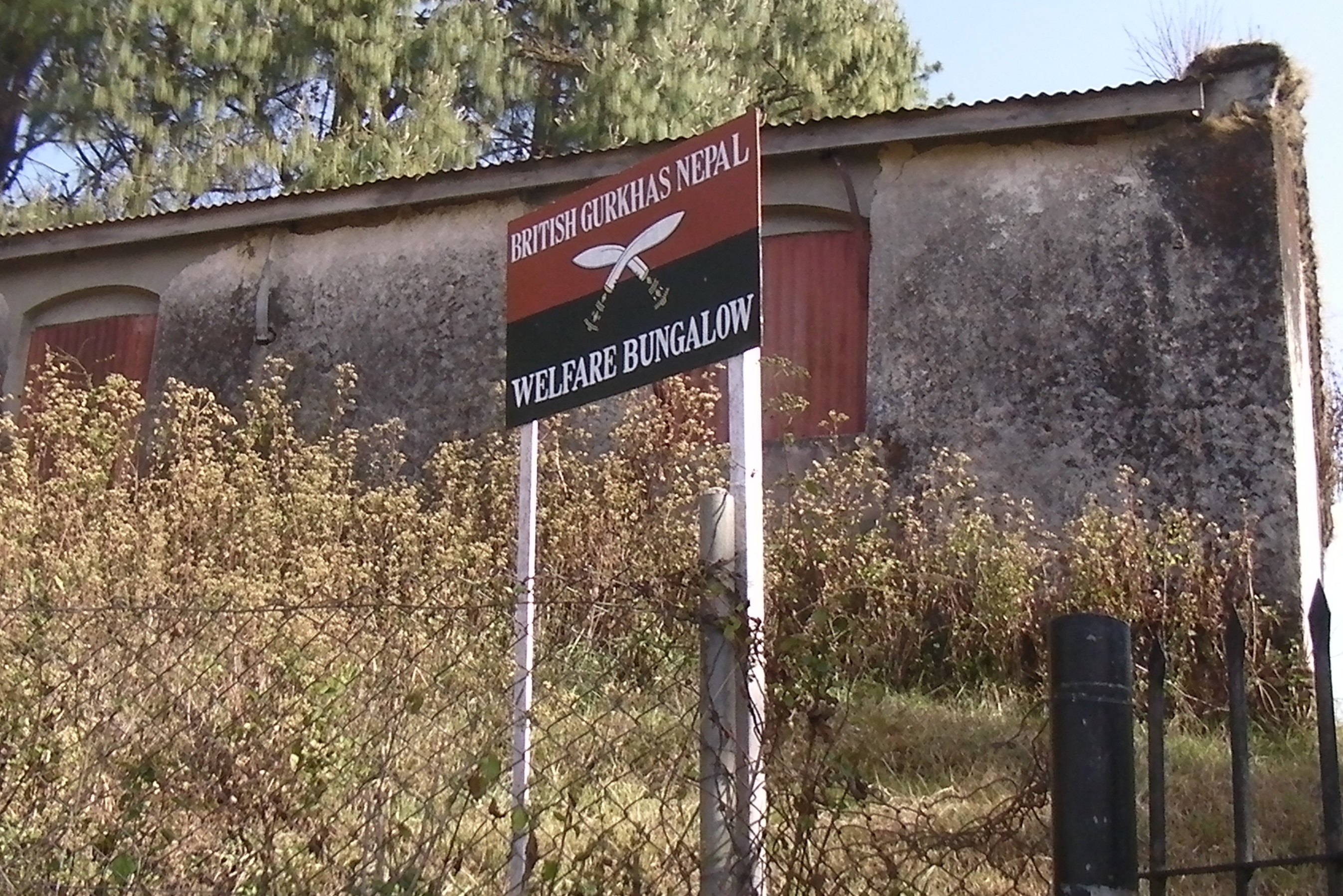

Kakani is a Gaunpalika and former village development committee in Nuwakot District in Bagmati Province of central Nepal. At the time of the 1991 Nepal census, the Kakani village development committee administered a population of 7816 living in 1343 individual households.

As one of the most accessible settlements from Kathmandu over 2,000 metres (6,600 ft), this hill station hosts a British Gurkhas welfare bungalow and a number of hotels. The village is also home to a memorial park to the victims of Thai Airways International Flight 311.

A notable local industry is strawberry farming. Kakani is the best nearest destination for tourism from Kathmandu. With the assistance of a United Nations Development Programme project, a local farmers' cooperative now produces close to 250,000 kg (550,000 lb) of the fruit per year.

== Ward office of Kakani ==
For the easiness of local people Nepal Government have formed a Kakani Rural Municipality by collapsing the former Village development committee. The Rural municipality has 8 Ward and each ward has an elected body to serve the people. Here are the list of ward and their office.

Ward No 1: Okharpauwa
Ward No 2: Okharpauwa
Ward No 3: Chauthe
Ward No 4: Kakani
Ward No 5: Kakani
Ward No 6: Madanpur, Nuwakot
Ward No 7: Chaturale
Ward No 8: Vot Thansing

== Climate ==
Climate data for Kakani, elevation 2,064 m (6,772 ft), (1976–2005)
Month	Jan	Feb	Mar	Apr	May	Jun	Jul	Aug	Sep	Oct	Nov	Dec	Year
Mean daily maximum °C (°F)	13.6 (56.5)	15.4 (59.7)	19.6 (67.3)	22.6 (72.7)	22.8 (73.0)	22.7 (72.9)	22.3 (72.1)	22.6 (72.7)	22.0 (71.6)	20.8 (69.4)	18.0 (64.4)	14.9 (58.8)	19.8 (67.6)
Mean daily minimum °C (°F)	3.0 (37.4)	4.7 (40.5)	8.3 (46.9)	11.4 (52.5)	13.5 (56.3)	15.4 (59.7)	16.0 (60.8)	15.8 (60.4)	14.9 (58.8)	11.7 (53.1)	8.0 (46.4)	4.8 (40.6)	10.6 (51.1)
Average precipitation mm (inches)	19.5 (0.77)	25.6 (1.01)	41.3 (1.63)	68.7 (2.70)	202.1 (7.96)	483.8 (19.05)	737.5 (29.04)	753.2 (29.65)	400.7 (15.78)	80.4 (3.17)	9.0 (0.35)	18.1 (0.71)	2,864.9 (112.79)
Source: Agricultural Extension in South Asia

== Road to Kakani ==
The Pasang-Lhamu Highway goes through Kakani. It starts from Kathmandu and reaches up to Kerung at the border of China. The road is now under construction because they are upgrading the road and making it wider. This video shows some display about the road condition to Kakani

== See also ==
- Sisdol landfill- the biggest landfill site of Nepal located in Kakani
