= Tadi Rural Municipality =

Tadi (RM) तादी गाउँपालिका
- Rural Municipality
- Location Tadi (RM) (Nepal)
- Coordinates: 27°55′16″N 85°18′27″E
- Country: Nepal
- Province: Bagmati
- District: Nuwakot
- Wards: 6
- Established: 10 March 2017

Government
  - Type: Local Government
  - Chairperson: Mr.Santaman Tamang
  - Vice-chairperson: Mrs. Sanju Pyakurel
  - Term of office: (2022 - 2027)

Area
  - Total: 69.80 km^{2} (26.95 sq mi)

Population (2011)
  - Total: 17,932
  - Density: 256.9/km^{2} (665.4/sq mi)
- Time zone: UTC+5:45 (Nepal Standard Time)
- Headquarter: Kharanitar
- Website: tadimun.gov.np

Tadi is a Rural municipality located within the Nuwakot District of the Bagmati Province of Nepal. The municipality spans 69.80 square kilometres (26.95 sq mi) of area, with a total population of 17,932 according to a 2011 Nepal census.

On March 10, 2017, the Government of Nepal restructured the local level bodies into 753 new local level structures. The previous Urleni, Ralukadevi, Kharanitar, Samundradevi and Narjamandap VDCs were merged to form Tadi Rural Municipality. Tadi is divided into 6 wards, with Kharanitar declared the administrative center of the rural municipality.

As of 2021, the population is 15,933.
