= Shivapuri Rural Municipality =

Shivapuri (RM) शिवपुरी गाउँपालिका
- Rural Municipality
- Location Shivapuri (RM) (Nepal)
- Coordinates: 27°52′21″N 85°21′57″E
- Country: Nepal
- Province: Bagmati
- District: Nuwakot
- Wards: 8
- Established: 10 March 2017

Government
  - Type: Rural Council
  - Chairperson: Mr. Govinda Prasad Thapaliya
  - Vice-chairperson: Mr. Bir Bahadur Tamang

Area
  - Total: 101.5 km^{2} (39.2 sq mi)

Population (2021)
  - Total: 17,203
  - Density: 169.5/km^{2} (439.0/sq mi)
- Time zone: UTC+5:45 (Nepal Standard Time)
- Office of Rural Municipality: Sherabagar
- Website: shivapurimun.gov.np

Shivapuri is a Rural municipality located within the Nuwakot District of the Bagmati Province of Nepal. The municipality spans 101.5 square kilometres (39.2 sq mi) of area, with a total population of 17,203 according to a 2021 Nepal census.

On March 10, 2017, the Government of Nepal restructured the local level bodies into 753 new local level structures. The previous Talakhu, Chhap, Likhu, Sikre Mahakali, Samundradevi, Sunakhani and Thanapati VDCs were merged to form Shivapuri Rural Municipality. Shivapuri is divided into 8 wards.
