= Myagang Rural Municipality =

Myagang (RM) म्यागङ गाउँपालिका
- Rural Municipality
- Location Myagang (RM) (Nepal)
- Coordinates: 27°58′38″N 85°05′49″E
- Country: Nepal
- Province: Bagmati
- District: Nuwakot
- Wards: 6
- Established: 10 March 2017

Government
  - Type: Rural Council
  - Chairperson: Mr. Asha Tamang
  - Vice-chairperson: Mrs. Shanti Lama Gurung
  - Term of office: (2017 - 2022)

Area
  - Total: 97.83 km^{2} (37.77 sq mi)

Population (2011)
  - Total: 13,479
  - Density: 137.8/km^{2} (356.8/sq mi)
- Time zone: UTC+5:45 (Nepal Standard Time)
- Headquarter: Deural
- Website: myagangmun.gov.np

Myagang is a Rural municipality located within the Nuwakot District of the Bagmati Province of Nepal. The municipality spans 97.83 square kilometres (37.77 sq mi) of area, with a total population of 13,479 according to a 2011 Nepal census.

On March 10, 2017, the Government of Nepal restructured the local level bodies into 753 new local level structures. The previous Barsunchet, Kintang, Deurali, Bungtang and Samari VDCs were merged to form Myagang Rural Municipality. Myagang is divided into 6 wards, with Deurali declared the administrative center of the rural municipality.
