= Kispang Rural Municipality =

Kispang (RM) किस्पाङ गाउँपालिका
- Rural Municipality
- Location Kispang (RM) (Nepal)
- Coordinates: 28°00′12″N 85°08′01″E
- Country: Nepal
- Province: Bagmati
- District: Nuwakot
- Wards: 5
- Established: 10 March 2017

Government
  - Type: Rural Council
  - Chairperson: Mr. Birbal Tamang
  - Vice-chairperson: Mr.Arjun Neupane
  - Term of office: (2022_

Area
  - Total: 82.57 km^{2} (31.88 sq mi)

Population (2011)
  - Total: 14,861
  - Density: 180.0/km^{2} (466.1/sq mi)
- Time zone: UTC+5:45 (Nepal Standard Time)
- Headquarter: Kaule
- Website: kispangmun.gov.np

Kispang is a Rural municipality located within the Nuwakot District of the Bagmati Province of Nepal. The municipality spans 82.57 square kilometres (31.88 sq mi) of area, with a total population of 14,861 according to a 2011 Nepal census.

On March 10, 2017, the Government of Nepal restructured the local level bodies into 753 new local level structures. The previous Salme, Bhalche, Kaule, Phikuri and Manakamana VDCs were merged to form Kispang Rural Municipality. Kispang is divided into 5 wards, with Kaule declared the administrative center of the rural municipality.
