= Belkotgadhi Municipality =

Belkotgadhi Municipality बेलकोटगढी नगरपालिका
- Municipality
- Location in Bagmati Province, Nepal Belkotgadhi Municipality (Nepal)
- Coordinates: 27.84°N 85.11°E
- Country: Nepal
- Province: Bagmati Province
- District: Nuwakot District
- Total wards: 13
- Established: 10 March 2017
- Incorporated former VDCs: Belkot, Kumari, Duipipal, Ratmate, Jiling, and Madanpur
- Administrative center: Jiling

Government
  - Type: Mayor–council government
  - Body: Belkotgadhi Municipality
  - Mayor: Jagat Bahadur Gurung
  - Deputy Mayor: Bahadur Lama

Area
  - Total: 155.6 km^{2} (60.1 sq mi)

Population (2011)
  - Total: 39,888
  - Density: 256.3/km^{2} (663.9/sq mi)
- Time zone: UTC+5:45 (Nepal Time)
- Website: belkotgadhimun.gov.np

Belkotgadhi Municipality is a municipality located in Nuwakot District of Bagmati Province in central Nepal. The municipality was officially established on 10 March 2017 following the restructuring of local administrative units by the Government of Nepal.

The municipality was formed through the merger of the former Village Development Committees (VDCs) of Belkot, Kumari, Duipipal, Ratmate, Jiling, and Madanpur. The administrative headquarters of the municipality is located in Jiling.

Belkotgadhi Municipality covers an area of 155.6 square kilometres (60.1 sq mi) and had a population of 39,888 according to the 2011 Nepal census.

== Geography ==
Belkotgadhi Municipality lies in the hilly region of central Nepal and features diverse topography including forests, agricultural terraces, rivers, and rural settlements. The municipality experiences a subtropical to temperate climate depending on elevation.

The area is connected by regional road networks linking it with nearby municipalities and Kathmandu Valley.

== Demographics ==
According to the 2011 Nepal census, Belkotgadhi Municipality had a total population of 39,888. The municipality is home to people from various ethnic and cultural communities including Tamang, Brahmin, Chhetri, Newar, Gurung, and Dalit groups.

Nepali is the primary language spoken in the municipality, while Tamang and other local languages are also commonly used.

== Economy and occupation ==
Agriculture is the primary occupation of the residents of Belkotgadhi Municipality. Major agricultural products include rice, maize, millet, wheat, and vegetables. Livestock farming is also an important source of income for many households. In recent years, many residents have also become involved in:

- Foreign employment
- Small businesses and trade
- Government and private sector services
- Transportation and construction work

Remittances from migrant workers contribute significantly to the local economy.

== Migration ==
Like many rural municipalities in Nepal, Belkotgadhi has experienced migration trends both within Nepal and internationally. Many youths migrate to urban areas such as Kathmandu and abroad to countries including:

- Qatar
- Malaysia
- United Arab Emirates
- Saudi Arabia
- South Korea
- Japan

Internal migration toward cities for education, employment, and business opportunities has also increased in recent years.

== Education and infrastructure ==
Belkotgadhi Municipality has several public and private schools, health posts, and local government offices. Road connectivity and communication infrastructure have gradually improved after the municipality's establishment.

Electricity, drinking water systems, and internet access are available in most populated areas, although some remote settlements still face infrastructure challenges.

== Culture ==
The municipality celebrates major Nepali festivals such as:

- Dashain
- Tihar
- Maghe Sankranti
- Losar

Traditional music, dances, and local customs remain an important part of community life.

== Nepal Flood Damage ==
The municipality suffered huge losses in the Kashitar, Mahadev Phant, and Thulo Khola areas where 65 homes were lost or damaged. The Kashitar Picnic Spot and Cherry Garden Resort got entirely cleared, while more than 4 bridges were also wiped off.
