= Suryagadhi Rural Municipality =

Suryagadhi (RM) सुर्यगढी गाउँपालिका
- Rural Municipality
- Location Suryagadhi (RM) (Nepal)
- Coordinates: 27°56′52″N 85°13′46″E
- Country: Nepal
- Province: Bagmati
- District: Nuwakot
- Wards: 5
- Established: 10 March 2017

Government
  - Type: Rural Council
  - Chairperson: Mr. Santa Bahadur Ghale (Tamang)
  - Vice-chairperson: Mrs. Manju Budhathoki
  - Term of office: (2017 - 2022)

Area
  - Total: 49.09 km^{2} (18.95 sq mi)

Population (2011)
  - Total: 16,800
  - Density: 342/km^{2} (886/sq mi)
- Time zone: UTC+5:45 (Nepal Standard Time)
- Headquarter: Bageshwari Chokadi
- Website: suryagadhimun.gov.np

Suryagadhi is a Rural municipality located within the Nuwakot District of the Bagmati Province of Nepal. The municipality spans 49.09 square kilometres (18.95 sq mi) of area, with a total population of 16,800 according to a 2011 Nepal census.

On March 10, 2017, the Government of Nepal restructured the local level bodies into 753 new local level structures. The previous Lachyang, Bageshwari Chokadi, Kalikahalde and Ganeshthan VDCs were merged to form Suryagadhi Rural Municipality. Suryagadhi is divided into 5 wards, with Bageshwari Chokadi declared the administrative center of the rural municipality.
