= List of monuments in Nuwakot, Nepal =

This is a list of monuments in Nuwakot District, Nepal as officially recognized by and available through the website of the Department of Archaeology, Nepal. Nuwakot is a district of Bagmati Province and is located in central northern part of Nepal. Royal palaces and Hindu temples are the main attraction of this district.

== List of monuments ==
| ID | Name | Type | Location | District | Coordinates | Image |
|---|---|---|---|---|---|---|
| NP-NUW-01 | Nuwakot Palace | | Nuwakot | Nuwakot | | Nuwakot Palace Upload Photo |
| NP-NUW-02 | Kothe Fort | | | Nuwakot | | Upload Photo Upload Photo |
| NP-NUW-03 | Bhairabi Temple | | Nuwakot | Nuwakot | | Bhairabi Temple Upload Photo |

== See also ==
- List of monuments in Bagmati Province
- List of monuments in Nepal
