= Juino =

2016 book by Binita Baral

- Book Cover, First edition July 2016
- Author: Binita Baral
- Original title: जुइनो
- Cover artist: Milef-Fineprint
- Language: Nepali
- Genre: Fiction
- Set in: Nepal
- Published: 2016
- Publisher: FinePrint
- Publication place: Nepal
- Media type: Print (Paperback)
- Pages: 203
- ISBN: 9789937665131

Juino (Nepali: जुइनो) is a novel by actress Binita Baral, set in Madanpur, Nuwakot an outskirt of Kathmandu, Nepal. It was first published in 2016 by Fineprint Publication. Actress Reecha Sharma unveiled the book on June 30, 2016 at Nepal Tourism Board, Kathmandu.

== Synopsis ==
Juino follows a narration of Ashok, the male protagonist character of the novel. After all attempts to go abroad to make more money fail, Ashok goes back to his village and started to teach in a school. While teaching in school, he had an acquaintance with a lady named Katha and soon after they fell in love. The story revolves around the scenarios where society is heavily blended with its traditional etiquette.

== Characters ==
Katha

Katha is the main female protagonist character of Novel. She is a bold, beautiful, courageous lady with a mission. Her mission is "Agricultural Revolution" based on teaching students and their parents about how to do modern farming with limited resources. One day, she went out to Madanpur; where she finds Ashok, an English language teacher of a school. Soon after they fall into love each other.

Ashok

Ashok is the male protagonist character of Novel. He is an English teacher in a school, where Katha wants to establish an agricultural lab facility. Ashok's introvert nature makes him shy and full of doubts. He values social norms highly or just too afraid to take personal decisions. Yet, he falls in love with Katha from the first day that he sees her.

Head Master

Surya Prasad Baral, the head master of the school, plays a submissive role to connect Katha and Ashok in everyday life. He is helping Katha on her mission as he is her uncle too. He allowed Katha to live in his house for that time period and helped her outreach individual students and their parents. From his eyes, he sees one of his employee dating his own daughter-in-law.

Yudda Pandey

Yudda Pandey is father of Ashok. He has got his fame because of his daunting personality. He represents older generation who lobbies for very strict regulations within the family.

Harey

Harey, Ashok's childhood friend, who later becomes a friend of both Ashok and Katha. But unlike Ashok, he didn't go to school so was unemployed before he meets Katha. He represents an innocent voice of unemployed youth of countryside. He has got a great sense of humor and makes story often humorous.

Saraswoti Didi

Saraswoti Didi is a local vendor. She is single mom with three daughters. She sells liquor for living. Her character represents physical and psychological hardship of a typical single mom.

Reena

Reena, Katha's childhood friend. She lives in Kathmandu, the capital city of Nepal. She offers her house for Ashok and Katha when they are travelling to find some love-nest where they takes their relationship into one another level. She helps them (Katha and Ashok) to reunite after a heartbreaking separation.
