= Deurali =

Deurali may refer to several places in Nepal:

- Deurali, Bagmati
- Deurali, Dhawalagiri
- Deurali, Gorkha
- Deurali, Kaski
- Deurali, Kosi
- Deurali, Nawalparasi
- Deurali, Palpa
- Deurali, Ramechhap
- Deurali, Tanahu
- Deurali, Lamjung
