= Sisdol landfill =

Solid waste landfill site in Nepal

Sisdol landfill is a location to dump solid waste from Kathmandu, Lalitpur, Bhaktapur, Kakani, and Banepa. It is the biggest dumping site of Nepal. 100 tons of solid waste is dumped at the site daily. The landfill is located at Kakani Rural Municipality (previously Okharpauwa Village Development Committee) of Nuwakot district.

The landfill site has an area of 15 hectares. Two hectares of land is used for the actual filling while 12 ha are used as a buffer and the remaining 1 hectare is used for other facilities. The landfill site has two valleys, with a capacity of 166,085 and 108,910 cubic meters respectively.

The waste from various cities is first collected in Teku transfer station. From the station, the waste is dispatched to Sisdol. Around 60 % of wastes in the Sisdol are organic but the waste remains mostly unsegregated. The recyclable waste is brought back and sold to recycling industries. The dump is filled in a semi-aerobic condition.

== Environment and social concerns ==
The landfill site was leased by the Nepal government in June 2005 for two years from the locals as a temporary location. However, the government kept on using the land even after the lease expired. Due to overuse, the nearby 40-50 ropanis of land have become unusable. This has caused numerous clashes between the locals and the government resulting in strikes and stoppages of vehicular movement to the dumping location.

In 2007, the government bought 792 ropanis of land two kilometres south from the existing Sisdol landfill site to build a permanent landfill at Banchare Danda.

== See also ==
- Banchare Danda landfill
