= Kaule =

Kaule may refer to:

- Kaule, Sagarmatha, Nepal
- Kaule, Bagmati, Nepal
- Kaule, Narayani, Nepal
