= Bhairabi Temple, Nuwakot =

Hindu temple in Nuwakot, Nepal

Bhairabi Temple
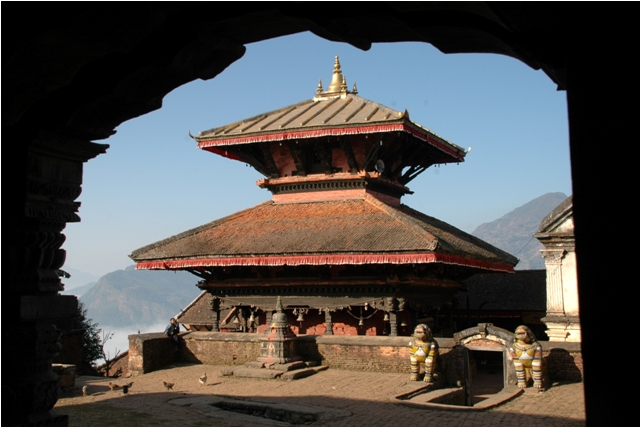

- Location within Bagmati Province Location within Nepal

Religion
- Affiliation: Hinduism
- District: Nuwakot District
- Province: Bagmati
- Deity: Bhairavi
- Festival: Dashain

Location
- Location: Bidur Municipality
- Country: Nepal
- Interactive map of Bhairabi Temple
- Coordinates: 27.91257330073942°N 85.16375186596684°E

Bhairabi Temple is a Hindu temple in Bidur Municipality, Nuwakot, Nepal. It is dedicated to goddess Bhairavi, the consort of god Bhairav. It lies about 200m south from the seven storied palace. This temple is also known by the name of Gandaki bhairavi getting its name from the Trishuli Gandaki River.

The April 2015 Nepal earthquake devastated the Bhairabi Temple and it was restored in August 2020.

== History ==
The original date of establishment of the temple is reported differently by various authors. Some source mentions that the temple was built in 1783 by Jagat Jaya Malla or Gagjaya Malla. Other sources mentions that the temple was built around Nepal's first king Prithvi Narayan Shah's reign.

In 1793, Bahadur Shah installed a copper plate declaring Nepal's victory in the First Sino-Nepalese War at the temple. The weapons seized in that war was stored on the second story of the temple.

== Architecture ==
The main door of the temple faces west. The main temple is built in a Pagoda shape. The walls and supports are constructed with traditional bricks and woodcrafts. Sculpture of various deities and Aasthamatrika is placed inside the temple. A pair of lions made using metal and another pair made using stone is placed in front of the main door. Sculpture of two female with their hands filled with sindur (vermillion) stands on either side of the main stair. The current copper roof was installed by Bahadur Shah in 1793.

== Main priest ==
The main priest of the temple is called Dhami. Traditionally, the priest is not allowed to cross the Trishuli and Tadi rivers without the king's permission. When the priest dies, his first son replaces him.

== Festivals ==
Sindru Jatra is celebrated every year near the temple.

== See also ==
- Nuwakot Palace
- Gorkha Durbar
- Bagh Bhairab Temple
