= Tupche =

Tupche तुप्चे
- Village development committee
- Location in Nepal
- Coordinates: 27.97°N 85.15°E
- Country: Nepal
- Zone: Bagmati Zone
- District: Nuwakot District

Population (1991)
  - Total: 5,462
- Time zone: UTC+5:45 (Nepal Time)

Tupche is a village development committee in Nuwakot District in the Bagmati Zone of central Nepal. At the time of the 1991 Nepal census it had a population of 5462 people living in 968 individual households.
