= Dhyangphedi =

Coordinates: 28°0′N 83°10′E

Dhyangphedi ध्याङफेदी
- Village development committee
- Interactive map of Dhyangphedi
- Country: Nepal
- Zone: Bagmati Zone
- District: Nuwakot District

Population (1991)
  - Total: 2,570
- Time zone: UTC+5:45 (Nepal Time)

Dhyangphedi is a village development committee in Nuwakot District in the Bagmati Zone of central Nepal. At the time of the 1991 Nepal census it had a population of 2570 living in 434 individual households.
