= Chaughada =

Chaughada चौघड
- Village development committee
- Location in Nepal
- Coordinates: 27.90°N 85.26°E
- Country: Nepal
- Zone: Bagmati Zone
- District: Nuwakot District

Population (1991)
  - Total: 5,795
- Time zone: UTC+5:45 (Nepal Time)

Chaughada is a village development committee in Nuwakot District in the Bagmati Zone of central Nepal. At the time of the 1991 Nepal census, it had a population of 5795 living in 1010 individual households.
