= Budhasing =

Budhasing बुधसिङ
- Village development committee
- Location in Nepal
- Coordinates: 27.87°N 85.05°E
- Country: Nepal
- Zone: Bagmati Zone
- District: Nuwakot District

Population (1991)
  - Total: 3,113
- Time zone: UTC+5:45 (Nepal Time)

Budhasing is a village development committee in Nuwakot District in the Bagmati Zone of central Nepal. At the time of the 1991 Nepal census the area it represented had a population of 3113 living in 575 individual households.
