= Ganeshthan =

Ganeshsthan गणेशस्थान
- Village development committee
- Location in Nepal
- Coordinates: 27.92°N 85.25°E
- Country: Nepal
- Zone: Bagmati Zone
- District: Nuwakot District

Population (1991)
  - Total: 3,413
- Time zone: UTC+5:45 (Nepal Time)

Ganeshsthan is a village development committee in Nuwakot District in the Bagmati Zone of central Nepal. At the time of the 1991 Nepal census, it had a population of 3,413 living in 630 individual households.
