= Belkot =

Belkot वेलकोट
- Village development committee
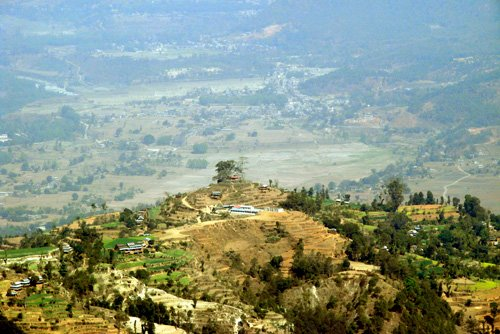

- Location in Nepal
- Coordinates: 27.83°N 85.16°E
- Country: Nepal
- Zone: Bagmati Zone
- District: Nuwakot District

Population (1991)
  - Total: 6,776
- Time zone: UTC+5:45 (Nepal Time)

Belkot is a village development committee in Nuwakot District in the Bagmati Zone of central Nepal. A mountain village, it is roughly 20 kilometres (12 mi) by air northwest of the centre of Kathmandu. At the time of the 1991 Nepal census it had a population of 6776 people living in 1247 individual households.
