= Kalikahalde =

Kalikahalde कालिकाहल्दे
- Village development committee
- Location in Nepal
- Coordinates: 27.93°N 85.24°E
- Country: Nepal
- Zone: Bagmati Zone
- District: Nuwakot District

Population (1991)
  - Total: 3,206
- Time zone: UTC+5:45 (Nepal Time)

Kalikahalde is a village development committee in Nuwakot District in the Bagmati Zone of central Nepal. At the time of the 1991 Nepal census it had a population of 3,206 people living in 602 individual households.
