= Kishor Nepal =

Nepalese journalist

- किशोर नेपाल
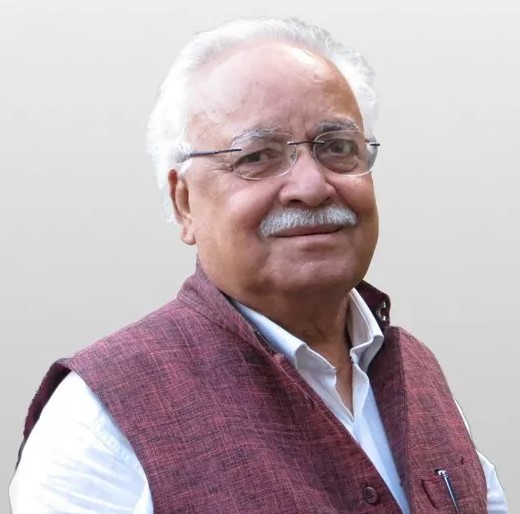
- Born: 6 June 1952 (age 74); Nuwakot district
- Citizenship: Nepal
- Occupations: Writer, Journalist
- Writing career
- Language: Nepali

Kishor Nepal (Nepali: किशोर नेपाल, born 6 June 1952) is a Nepalese journalist and writer. He worked for and groomed Kantipur and Nagarik Nepalese publications.

== Biography ==
Nepal was born on 6 June 1952 in Nuwakot district. When Nepal was five years old, his father died, and his mother started working. Nepal went to Pashupati School in Chabahil, Nepal, and then got government scholarship to study in Durbar High School in Kathmandu. He completed higher education in Tri-Chandra College in Kathmandu.

After the college, Nepal started working as a supervisor in Department of Road in Bhairahawa for about five months, and then as a journalist from 2027 BS (1970–1971)for local newspaper named Nabin Khabar. Later he joined Nepal Times under supervision of Chandra Lal Jha. He joined Gorkhapatra in 2033 BS (1976–1977), but he resigned from the post to work as a political cadre for Nepali Congress on call from Krishna Prasad Bhattarai. Later, he worked as press advisor when Krishna Prasad Bhattarai was elected as a prime minister.

== Career and contributions ==
He worked as the president of Federation of Nepali Journalists. Currently he working as the Editor In Chief of Rupaantaran.

== Books ==
- Mero Samaya (my time)
- Sutra Ra Prayog (Theories, Sources and Practices) in 2016.
- Nepali patrakarita ko bikaskram (2055 BS) (Development of Nepali journalism)
- Rang Mandal (Short novel, 2035 BS)
- Arko Prastar (Short stories, 2034 BS)
- Chintaka Chyanharu (Essays, 1982)
- Shaktiko awataran (Essays, 2062)
- Patal (Novel, 2068 BS)
- Shaharka Kathaharu (Novel, 2068 BS) (Stories of city)

== Awards ==
- Kriti Smriti Journalism Britti Samman in 2019 from Ram Baran Yadav, the former president of Nepal.

== Controversies ==
Nepal was beaten by attackers in December 2012 for publishing some photos which were taken as offensive by the supporter of monarch.
