= Phikuri =

Phikuri फिकुरी
- Village development committee
- Location in Nepal
- Coordinates: 28.02°N 85.16°E
- Country: Nepal
- Zone: Bagmati Zone
- District: Nuwakot District

Population (1991)
  - Total: 2,371
- Time zone: UTC+5:45 (Nepal Time)

Phikuri is a village development committee in Nuwakot District in the Bagmati Zone of central Nepal. At the time of the 1991 Nepal census it had a population of 2,371 living in 440 individual households.
