= Lachyang =

Lachyang लच्याङ
- Village development committee
- Location in Nepal
- Coordinates: 27.96°N 85.29°E
- Country: Nepal
- Zone: Bagmati Zone
- District: Nuwakot District

Population (1991)
  - Total: 3,633
- Time zone: UTC+5:45 (Nepal Time)

Lachyang is a village development committee in Nuwakot District in the Bagmati Zone of central Nepal. At the time of the 1991 Nepal census it had a population of 3633 people living in 720 individual households.
