= Bageshwari Chokadi =

Bageshwari Chokade बागेश्वरी चोकदे
- Village development committee
- Location in Nepal
- Coordinates: 27.95°N 85.24°E
- Country: Nepal
- Zone: Bagmati Zone
- District: Nuwakot District

Population (1991)
  - Total: 4,693
- Time zone: UTC+5:45 (Nepal Time)

VDC Map of Nuwakot District

Bageshwari Chokadi is a village development committee in Nuwakot District in the Bagmati Zone of central Nepal. At the time of the 1991 Nepal census it had a population of 4693 living in 850 individual households.
