= Banchare Danda landfill =

Solid waste landfill site in Nepal

Banchare Danda landfill is an under construction sanitary landfill site to dispose the solid waste of Kathmandu Valley. It will be used as permanent disposal site after closure of Sisdol landfill. Banchare Danda lies about 27 km from Kathmandu and approximately 1.9 km west of existing Sisdole landfill. The Banchare Danda landfill was identified during 2007. The actual construction started in 2019 using 1792 Ropanis of land in Nuwakot and Dhading districts based on the cabinet decision on 3 December 2018 to implement the Integrated Solid Waste Management Project. The landfill site has capacity of about three million cubic metres consisting of two cells. The Cell-1 of the dumping site was ready for use in September 2021 while other parts remains under construction.

== Social issues ==
The locals have been protesting to use Banchare Danda as an alternative to Sisdole landfill site because government could not meet the local's demand. The demand includes establishing a 50-bed hospital, free ambulance services, and job facilities for each affected household.

== See also ==
- Sisdol landfill
