= Kumari, Nepal =

Kumari कुमरी
- Village development committee
- Location in Nepal
- Coordinates: 27.79°N 85.14°E
- Country: Nepal
- Zone: Bagmati Zone
- District: Nuwakot District

Population (1991)
  - Total: 6,458
- Time zone: UTC+5:45 (Nepal Time)

Kumari is a village development committee in Nuwakot District in the Bagmati Zone of central Nepal. At the time of the 1991 Nepal census it had a population of 6458 people living in 1132 individual households.

== Clinic ==
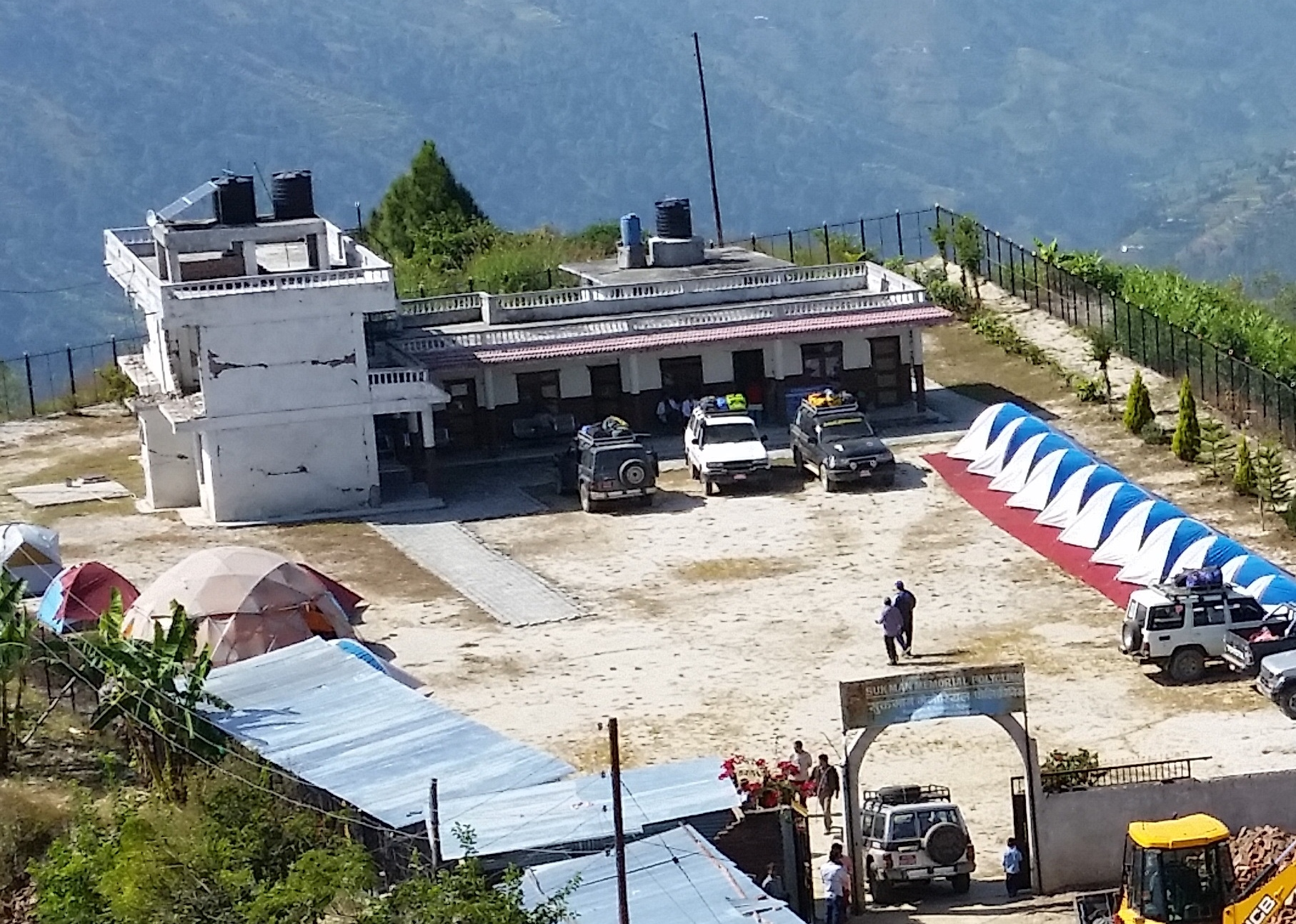
The polyclinic as seen from the Shree Bikas pre-secondary school

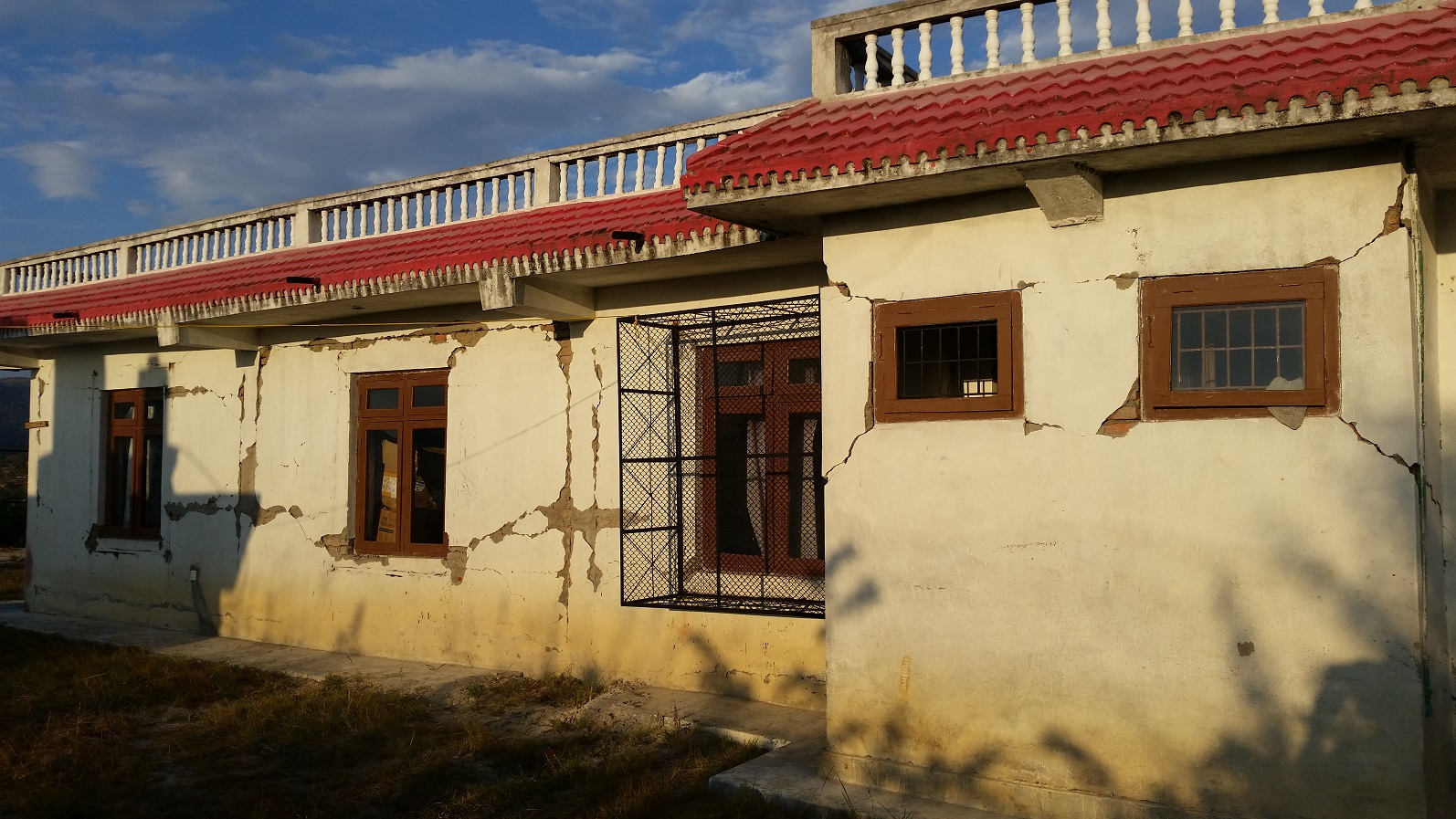
Damage to the polyclinic

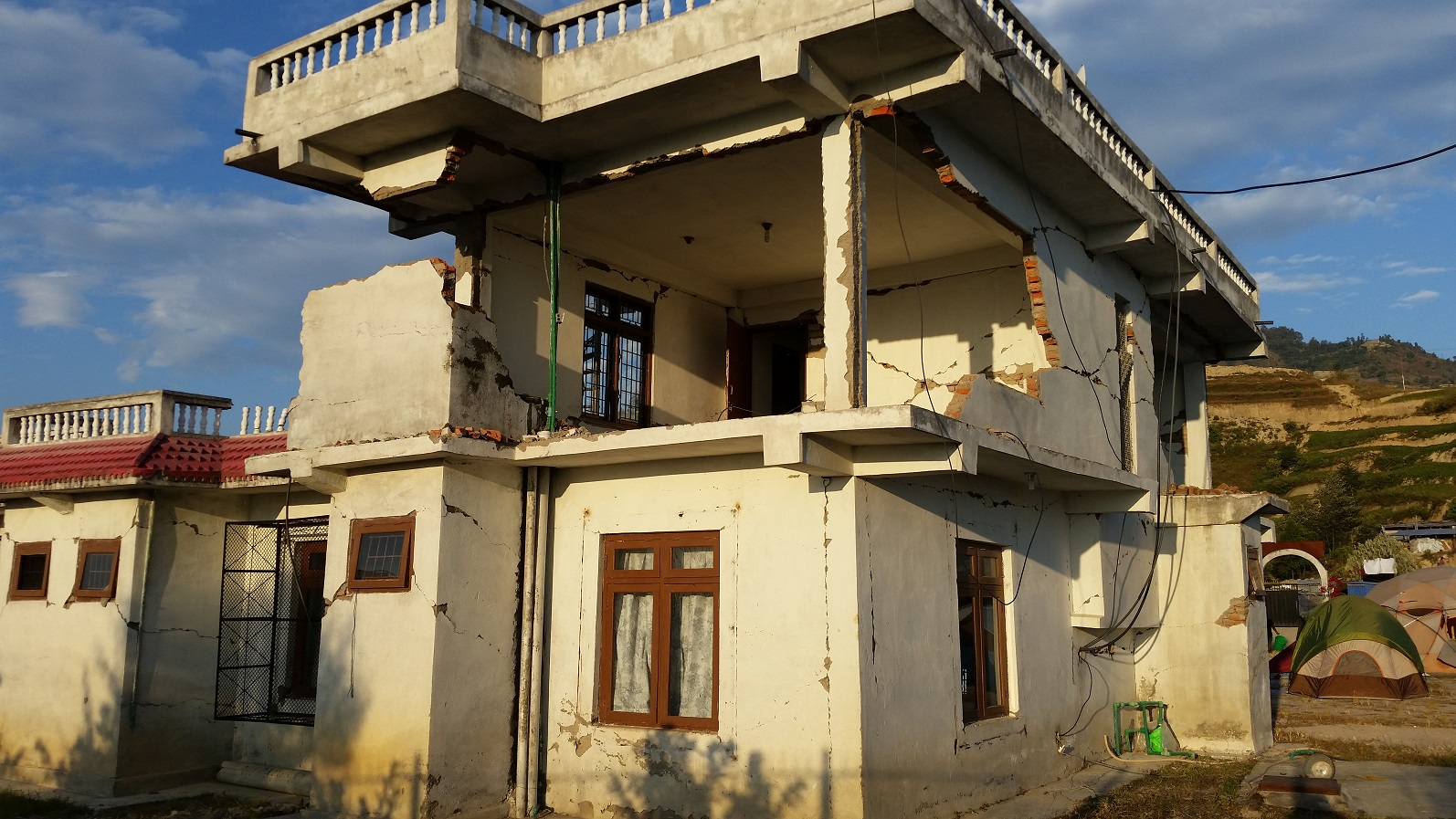
Damage to the polyclinic

The Sukman Medical Polyclinic was built by the Health and Ed 4 Nepal non-profit, which provides ongoing support. The clinic was severely damaged by the 23 April 2015 earthquake that struck Nepal but remains in partial operation.

== Schools ==
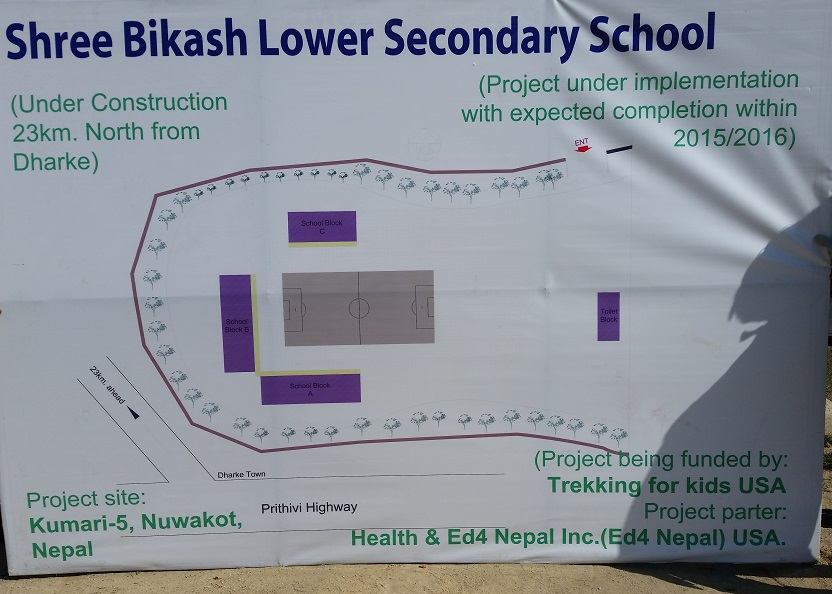
Plans for re-building of the school as of November 2015

The local pre-secondary school, Shree Bikash, was also severely damaged in the 23 April 2015 earthquake and its remains were demolished. Re-building of the school began in November 2015 via funding sourced by the non-profits Trekking for Kids and Health and Ed 4 Nepal.
