= Chhap =

Chhap छाप तारागाउ
- Village development committee
- Nickname: रिस्टाबोट
- Location in Nepal
- Coordinates: 27.83°N 85.41°E
- Zone: Bagmati Zone
- District: Nuwakot District

Population (1991)
  - Total: 1,826
- Time zone: UTC+5:45 (Nepal Time)

Chhap is a village development committee in Nuwakot District in the Bagmati Zone of central Nepal. At the time of the 1991 Nepal census it had a population of 1826 living in 353 individual households.
