= Duipipal =

Duipipal दुईपिपल
- Village development committee
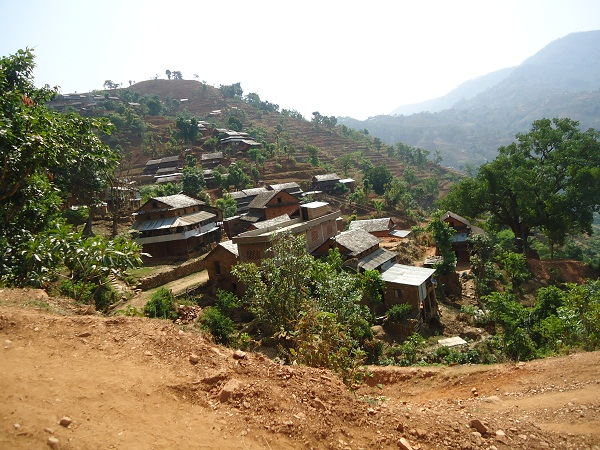

- Location in Nepal
- Coordinates: 27.82°N 85.07°E
- Country: Nepal
- Zone: Bagmati Zone
- District: Nuwakot District

Population (1991)
  - Total: 5,788
- Time zone: UTC+5:45 (Nepal Time)

Dui Pipal is a former Village Development Committee in Nuwakot District, Nepal. According to the new province system adopted by the government of Nepal, Dui Pipal lies in Belkotgadhi municipality. It is about 65 km from the capital city Kathmandu.

At the time of the 1991 Nepal Census it had a population of 5,788 people living in 1,052 individual households.
