= Barsunchet =

Barsunchet बर्सुञ्चेत
- Village development committee
- Location in Nepal
- Coordinates: 28.01°N 85.02°E
- Country: Nepal
- Zone: Bagmati Zone
- District: Nuwakot District

Population (1991)
  - Total: 608
- Time zone: UTC+5:45 (Nepal Time)

Barsunchet is a village development committee in Nuwakot District in the Bagmati Zone of central Nepal. At the time of the 1991 Nepal census it had a population of 608 people living in 112 individual households.
