= Kintang =

Kintang किन्ताङ्ग
- Village development committee
- Location in Nepal
- Coordinates: 28.03°N 85.04°E
- Country: Nepal
- Zone: Bagmati Zone
- District: Nuwakot District

Population (1991)
  - Total: 2,204.
- Time zone: UTC+5:45 (Nepal Time)

Kintang is a village development committee in Nuwakot District in the Bagmati Zone of central Nepal.

== Demographics ==
At the time of the 1991 Nepal census it had a population of 2204.
