= Bhalche =

Bhalche भाल्चे
- Village development committee
- Location in Nepal
- Coordinates: 28.05°N 85.12°E
- Country: Nepal
- Zone: Bagmati Zone
- District: Nuwakot District

Population (1991)
  - Total: 2,947
- Time zone: UTC+5:45 (Nepal Time)

Bhalche is a village development committee in Nuwakot District in the Bagmati Zone of central Nepal. At the time of the 1991 Nepal census it had a population of 2947 living in 624 individual households.

Currently bhalche is one of the ward of Kispang Rural Municipality of Nuwakot District. Years ago bhalche was known as pansyakhola. It has a Nepal’s largest sheep farm. It is also known for its unique culture, beautiful mountains. Every year in ekadasi, people worship the highest mountain there known as Singhla and fikuri as a symbol of peace.mostly people there are Buddhist and had a very old monastery established in 100bc.

== Climate ==
Climate data for Bhalche (Pansayakhola), elevation 1,240 m (4,070 ft), (1976–2005)
Month	Jan	Feb	Mar	Apr	May	Jun	Jul	Aug	Sep	Oct	Nov	Dec	Year
Average precipitation mm (inches)	22.2 (0.87)	31.7 (1.25)	42.7 (1.68)	74.9 (2.95)	210.2 (8.28)	483.8 (19.05)	842.9 (33.19)	827.9 (32.59)	472.5 (18.60)	81.4 (3.20)	13.0 (0.51)	17.2 (0.68)	3,128.4 (123.17)
Source: Agricultural Extension in South Asia
