= Okharpauwa =

Okharpauwa ओखरपौवा
- Village development committee
- Location in Nepal
- Coordinates: 27.80°N 85.25°E
- Country: Nepal
- Zone: Bagmati Zone
- District: Nuwakot District

Population (1991)
  - Total: 5,572
- Time zone: UTC+5:45 (Nepal Time)

Okharpauwa is a village development committee in Nuwakot District in the Bagmati Zone of central Nepal. At the time of the 1991 Nepal census it had a population of 5572 people living in 1003 individual households.
