= Bungtang =

Bungtang बुङताङ
- Village development committee
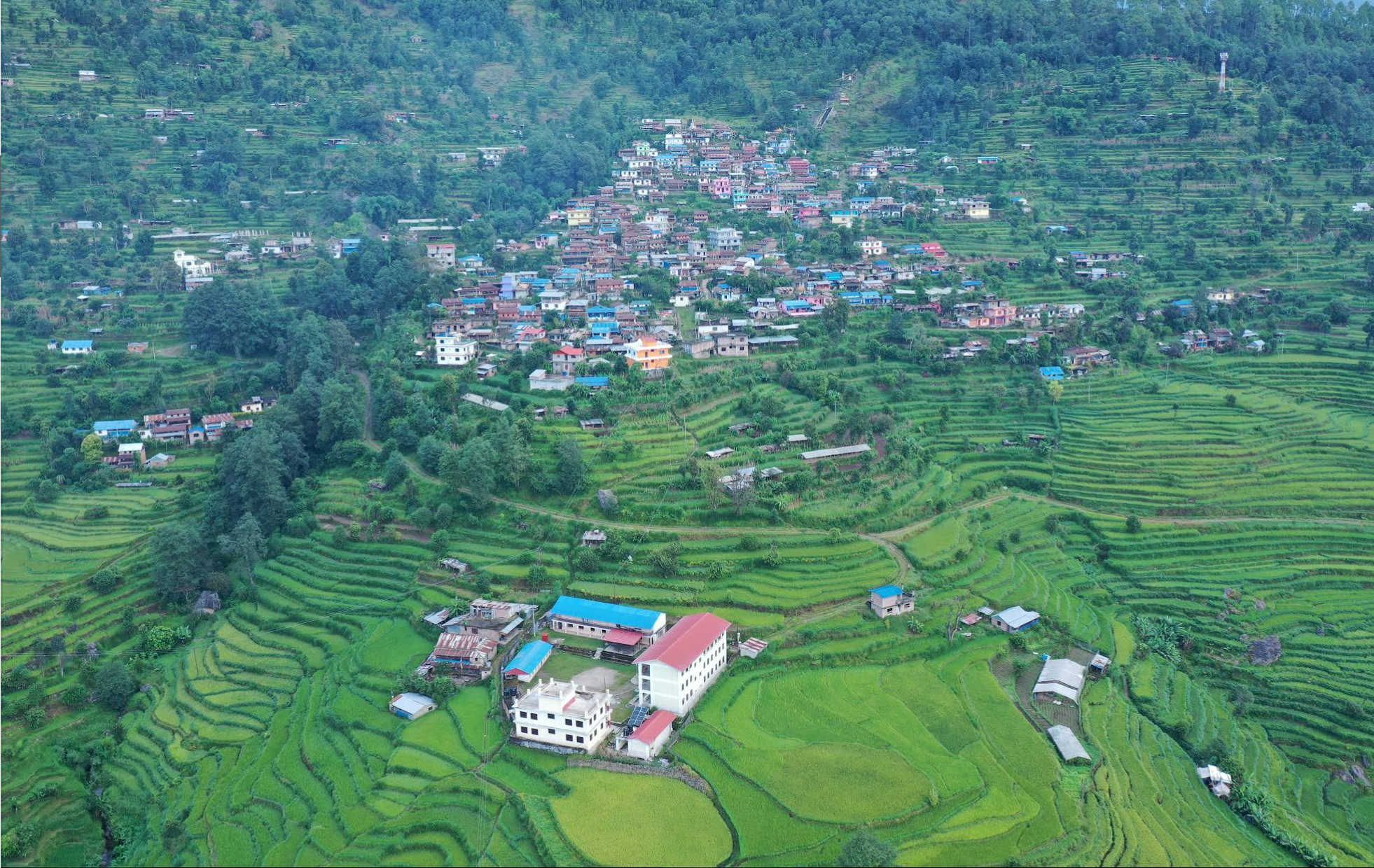
- Bungtang (Captured July 2024 )
- Nickname: Bomotang
- Location in Nepal
- Coordinates: 28.00°N 85.10°E
- Country: Nepal
- Zone: Bagmati Zone
- District: Nuwakot District

Population (2068 B.S./ 2012 A.D. Census)
  - Total: 2,269
- Time zone: UTC+5:45 (Nepal Time)

Bungtang (Currently Myagang Rural Municipality Ward no.2) बुङताङ is a village development committee in Nuwakot District in the Bagmati Zone (Bagmati Province ) of central Nepal. At the time of the [2068 B.S. census] (२०६८ को जनगणना अनुसार)] it had a population of 2069 living in 13.93 sq.km Area

The original name of the village was "Bomotang (बोम्तङ ) ". In Bhot language "Bomo" बोमो means Daughter or female "Tang" तङ means "being happy". "Bomotang" was such a beautiful place that women/female used to be happy when they come here. Hence the name "Bomotang". Later as it passed on was written Bungtang(बुङताङ).
