= Thansing =

Thansing थानसिङ
- Village development committee
- Location in Nepal
- Coordinates: 27.87°N 85.27°E
- Country: Nepal
- Zone: Bagmati Zone
- District: Nuwakot District

Population (1991)
  - Total: 5,951
- Time zone: UTC+5:45 (Nepal Time)

Thansing is a village development committee in Nuwakot District in the Bagmati Zone of central Nepal. At the time of the 1991 Nepal census it had a population of 5951 people living in 1020 individual households.

Thansing V.D.C has a government-affiliated Shree Mahendra Higher Secondary School. It is situated in the middle of village.

There are many religious places to visit in Thansing:

- Jalpa Devi: A temple of the Hindu goddess Durga, also called Kali
- Mahadav Temple: a temple of Hindu holy god lord Shiva.
- Kalika devi Temple: a temple of god Kali
- Bacchala Devi Temple Likhu -6 nuwakot: a temple of god Devi and Mahadav.
- Rameshwor Dham:
