= Narjamandap =

Narjamandap नर्जामण्डप Narja
- Village development committee
- Location in Nepal
- Coordinates: 27.93°N 85.29°E
- Country: Nepal
- Zone: Bagmati Zone
- District: Nuwakot District

Population (2011)
  - Total: 5,335 (Male: 2,656) (Female : 2,679)
- Time zone: UTC+5:45 (Nepal Time)

Narjamandap is a village development committee in Nuwakot District in the Bagmati Zone of central Nepal. At the time of the 2011 Nepal census it had a population of 5,335 people living in 1012 individual households.
