= Kharanitar =

Kharanitar खरानीटार
- Village development committee
- Location in Nepal
- Coordinates: 27.93°N 85.32°E
- Country: Nepal
- Zone: Bagmati Province

Population (1991)
  - Total: 1,524
- Time zone: UTC+5:45 (Nepal Time)

Kharanitar is a village development committee in Nuwakot District in the Bagmati Province of central Nepal. At the time of the 1991 Nepal census it had a population of 1524 people in 298 households.
