= Chaturale =

Chaturale चतुराले chatur bhuj ale
- Village development committee
- Location in Nepal
- Coordinates: 27°52′N 85°13′E
- Country: Nepal
- Zone: Bagmati Zone
- District: Nuwakot District

Government

Population (2011)
  - Total: 10,000
- Time zone: UTC+5:45 (Nepal Time)

Chaturale (Nepali: चतुराले) is a village in the Nuwakot District of Nepal. The Chaturale village lies in between two rivers, Dhade Khola and Sindure Khola. Chaturale is now located in Kakani Rural Municipality ward no 7. Chaturale is named after its founder, Chatur Bhuj Ale. The biggest occasion is mainly celebrated in Chaturale bazar.

== Population ==
At the time of the 2011 Nepal census it had a population of 10,000 living in 1,200 individual households. The population of Chaturale is decreasing day by day due to the migration of people to Kathmandu and foreign countries due to the lack of job opportunities in the village.

== Facilities ==
It has one secondary school called Mahendra Higher Secondary School, which is located at Dumrechaur, Chaturale, and a primary school called Shree Barmayani Primary School at Barbandi.

The government is planning to link Ranipauwa to Bidur via Chaturale with a better road.

== Challenges and Development Issues ==
Despite being only 35 kilometers from Nepal's capital, Kathmandu, Chaturale faces significant challenges that hinder its development and quality of life. According to Pawan Raj Pandey, a local software engineer now residing in Kathmandu, the village lacks basic infrastructure and amenities. The road network is in poor condition, making transportation difficult and limiting access to essential services. Public transportation is scarce, with buses to Kathmandu and nearby cities like Bidur and Battar facing significant challenges navigating the rugged terrain. This has contributed to significant out-migration, as residents seek better opportunities in urban centers.

Additionally, Chaturale suffers from limited access to groceries and essential goods due to the scarcity of shops. Mobile network coverage and internet services are unreliable, restricted to certain areas, which isolates the community and hampers communication and economic opportunities. The village also faces challenges with low literacy rates, exacerbated by a lack of public awareness campaigns and educational initiatives. Despite Nuwakot District's reputation for producing renowned politicians, Chaturale remains one of the most underdeveloped areas in the district and Nepal as a whole.

Pawan Raj Pandey highlights the untapped potential for tourism in Chaturale, noting that improved infrastructure, particularly better roads, could attract visitors to the village’s scenic location between the Dhade Khola and Sindure Khola rivers. Investments in basic amenities, education, and connectivity could not only curb migration but also foster economic growth and improve living standards.
