= Lawa Pyakurel =

- लव प्याकुरेल
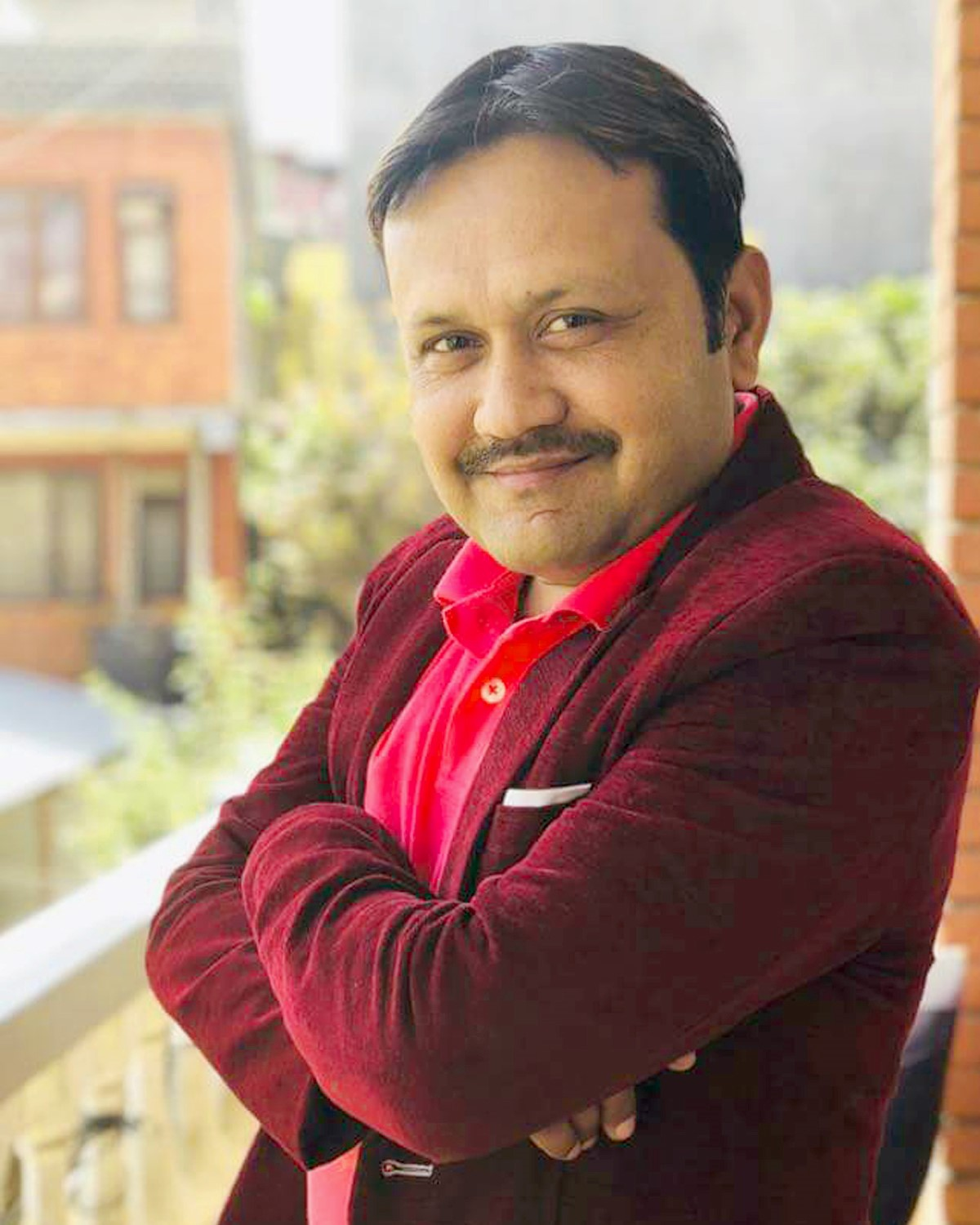
- Born: 1973 (age 52–53); Likhu-04, Chaughada, Nuwakot, Nepal
- Occupations: Documentary Filmmaker and Editor
- Years active: 1994 - present

Lawa Pyakurel (born April 30, 1973, Nepali: लव प्याकुरेल), born Bala Ram Pyakurel, is a Nepalese filmmaker and editor primarily known for his work in the documentary film genre. His most notable films include Wound of Panchayat (Panchayat Ko Ghau), Blue Sky (Nilo Akash), and Girls Rewriting Destiny. Pyakurel is ab audiovisual producer proficient in both linear and non-linear editing systems.

== Career ==
Pyakurel has over 30 years of experience in the Nepalese film industry. He began his professional career in 1993 as an assistant director for the film 'Khandahar ko Phool' (Flower of Ruins), directed by Suyog Koirala. He later served as the chief assistant director and editor for Guru Dakshina and Raag-Viragam, which were Nepal's first Sanskrit-language telefilms.

In 1994, he produced his first documentary, Jhilko (A Spark Can Start a Great Fire). Since then, Pyakurel has worked on more than 100 projects, including feature film, short films, documentaries, television talk shows, news reports, television commercials (TVCs), and public service announcements (PSAs).

== Biography and recognition ==
Pyakurel has received several national and international honors for his work in cinema and media, including: Shikhar Honor (2018), Golden Honor (2019), Mahakavi Laxmi Prasad Devkota Talent Honor (2019), National Tribute Honor (2020), Special Citizen Award (2022).

In addition to his filmmaking, Pyakurel is a commentator on film-related themes. His articles and opinion pieces have appeared in major Nepalese national dailies, such as the Annapurna Post, Naya Patrika, Himalaya Times, and The Rising Nepal. He is also a founding member of the Executive Committee of the SAARC Journalist Forum (SJF) Nepal Chapter, an international organization representing journalists from South Asian countries.

== Selected filmography ==
Year	Title	Director	Editor	Producer	Genre
1993	Flower of Ruins (Khandahar ko Phool)		✓		Mega-serial
1994	Form and Fate (Rup ra Bhagya)		✓		Video Film
1994	A Spark Can Start a Great Fire (Jhilko)	✓	✓	✓	Documentary Film
1995	A Light of Hope (Ashako Diyo)	✓	✓		Video Film
1996	Time Watch (Samaya Ghadi)		✓		Experimental Film
1997	The Dream (Sapana)		✓		Video Film
1997	Atonement (Prayaschit)	✓	✓		Fiction Film
2000	Gurkhas’ Blues		✓		Documentary Film
2000	Marriage After 20+	✓	✓		TVC
2001	Safe Maternal Health	✓	✓		Celluloid Advertisement
2004	The Other Side of the Coin		✓		Documentary Film
2004	Community Actions-Global Impact		✓		Documentary Film
2005-06	Perspective (Distrikon)		✓		TV Program
2006	Kaal-khanda		✓		Novel Series
2006	People’s Participation in Rhino Conservation		✓		Documentary Film
2007	Guru Dakshina		✓		Sanskrit Language Tele-film
2007	Forgotten Woman (Birsieaka Mahilaharu)		✓		Documentary Film
2007	Angnima: The Icefall Doctor		✓		Observational Documentary
2008	Raag-Biragam		✓		Sanskrit Language Tele-film
2008	Wound of Panchayat (Panchayat ko Ghau)	✓	✓	✓	Documentary Film
2009	Sherpas: The True Heroes of Mount Everest		✓		Documentary Film
2010	The Shadow of Mount Everest (Sagarmatha ko Pratibimba)		✓		Documentary Film
2010	Enabling Smaller Voices		✓		Documentary Film
2011-14	Labour and Creation (Sharm ra Srijana)		✓		TV Program
2012	Nizamati: Under Fire		✓		Documentary Film
2012	Steps (Paila)		✓		Documentary Film
2012-13	Entrepreneur (Udhyam)		✓		TV Program
2013	Transforming Faces		✓		Documentary Film
2013	Helicopter Rescuer in the Himalayas		✓		Documentary Film
2013	Lumbini to Seoul		✓		Documentary Film
2013	Wish of God	✓	✓		TVC
2014	Save the Country	✓	✓	✓	Feature Film
2014	Teachers can make a Difference		✓		Campaign Video
2015	Revolving Face (Pheriyeko Muhar)	✓	✓		Documentary Film
2015	Revolving Face (Pheriye ko Muhar)		✓		Documentary Film
2015	Community Forestry: Trail to Highway		✓		Documentary Film
2015	Theater for Social Transformation		✓		Documentary Film
2015	Healer of Humla		✓		Experimental Short Video
2016	Cost of Dust (Dhulo ko Mulya)		✓		Documentary Film
2016	Karnali Development Diary		✓		Documentary Film
2016	Class Power (Barga-Satta)	✓	✓	✓	Documentary Film
2016	Education Reform Plan in Nepal		✓		Documentary Film
2016	Wedding of Maize (Makai ko Bihe)	✓	✓		Documentary Film
2016	Education Reform Plan in Nepal		✓		Documentary Film
2017	PPP (Public-Private-Partnership)		✓		Documentary Film
2017	Community Formularization		✓		Documentary Film
2017	Epic Centre: Blackout		✓		Documentary Film
2018	Technical Knowledge of Workers		✓		Educational Video Materials
2018	Gorilla Track		✓		Documentary Film
2018	Community Empowerment and Development Achievement		✓		Documentary Film
2019	Blue Sky (Nilo Akash)	✓	✓		Documentary Film
2019	Successful Story		✓		Participatory Documentary
2019	Unbroken Hopes		✓		Participatory Short Documentary
2020	Behind the Herd		✓		Experimental Documentary
2021	Ox Fiesta (Goru Parwa)		✓		Documentary Film
2022	Chitawan Irrigation; Community-based Project	✓	✓		Documentary Film
2022	Path of Development; Bagmati Irrigation Project	✓	✓		Documentary Film
2024	Girls Rewriting Destiny	✓	✓		Documentary Film
2025 (Updated)	Jugal: A Symbol of Unwavering Belief	✓	✓	✓	Documentary Film

== Awards ==
Title	Awards	Category	Film	Result
2009
Best Editor Best Director Best Documentary	National Nuwakot Documentary Film Festival (NNDFF)	Documentary Film	Wound of Panchayat	Won
2019
Heroes of Documentary Film Editor	NFDC National Film Award	Nepali Documentary	Non-fiction Genre	Won
2022
Best Documentary Filmmaker and Editor	Special Citizen Award and Honor	Art and Film	Art and Film Field	Won
2023				
Best Documentary Director	Spiny Babbler International Film Festival (SBIFF)	Documentary Film	Jugal: A Symbol of Unwavering Belief	Won
2025				
Best Documentary Film	Nepal International Film Festival (NIFF)	Audience Choice Award	Girls Rewriting Destiny	Won
2026				
Best National Documentary Film	Nepal Cultural International Film Festival	Best Documentary Award	Girls Rewriting Destiny	Won
