= Jiling =

Belkotgadhi 8 जिलिङ
- municipality
- Location in Nepal
- Coordinates: 27.84°N 85.11°E
- Country: Nepal
- Zone: Bagmati Zone
- District: Nuwakot District

Population (1991)
  - Total: 5,503
- Time zone: UTC+5:45 (Nepal Time)
- Postal code: 44900

Jiling is a municipality in Nuwakot District in the Bagmati Zone of central Nepal. At the time of the 1991 Nepal census it had a population of 5503 living in 1006 individual households.
