= Nuwakot Palace =

Nuwakot Durbar Complex
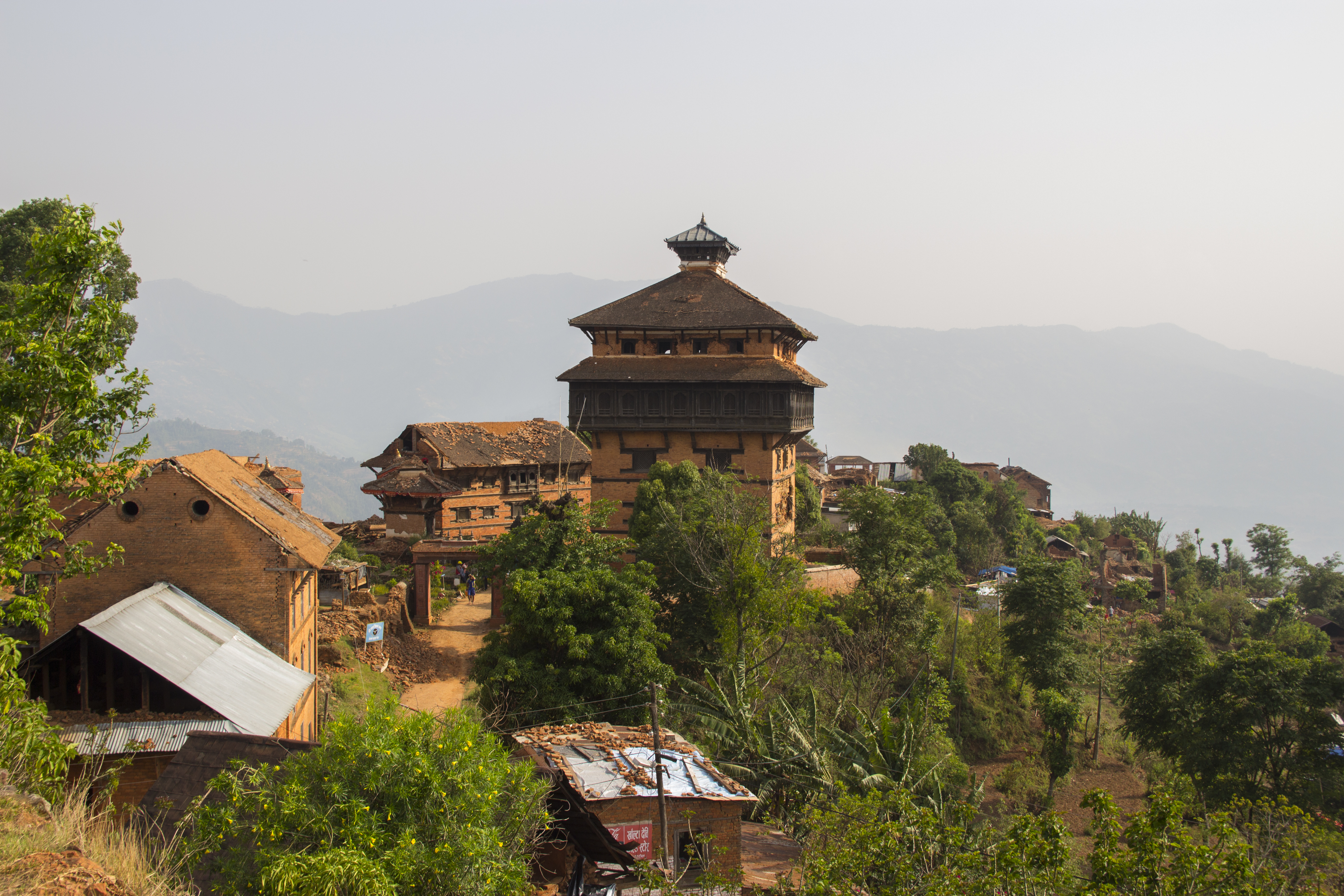
- Nuwakot Palace in 2015

- Location within Bagmati Province Location within Nepal

General information
- Type: Palace
- Architectural style: Nepalese architecture
- Location: Nuwakot, Nuwakot District, Bagmati Province, Nepal
- Coordinates: 27.913760831186664°N 85.16475430315691°E
- Opened: 18th Century

Nuwakot Palace is a palace built by Nepal's first king Prithvi Narayan Shah in the 18th century and is located in Nuwakot, Bidur Municipality.

The palace is currently being restored after the April 2015 Nepal earthquake which devastated the complex. Nuwakot Palace is currently listed as a UNESCO tentative site since 2008.

== Main palace ==
The current main palace was built after Prithivi Narayan Shah conquered Nuwakot in 1801 BS (1744–1745). After the victory of Nuwakot, he relocated the capital from Gorkha to Nuwakot considering it to an appropriate location for the continuation of unification campaign.

The palace has seven stories and thus is also called 'Sat-talle-durbar' (lit. seven storied palace) by locals. The ground floor was built to keep courtiers and guards. The main meeting room (Baitakh), prayer room and living room (called Shrinagar kakshya) is located on the first floor. The room for the king and queen is in the second floor. Third floor has a prayer room. Fourth floor was used to station armies and guards. Fifth and sixth floors were used as prison. King of Tanahu, Tri Bikaram Sen and Bal Narsingh of Kirtipir were imprisoned here. And the seventh floor was used as Burja. The roof uses glazed tile.

The plinth area of the place is 84 feet by 36 feet. The main door of the palace faces towards east. The palace is built in the form of fort with a wall thickness of 6 feet. Carved windows (Aankhi jhyal) are placed in various floors. The palace imitates the architecture style of Kathmandu. Craftsmen from Lalitpur were used to construct the palace.

== Annex structures ==
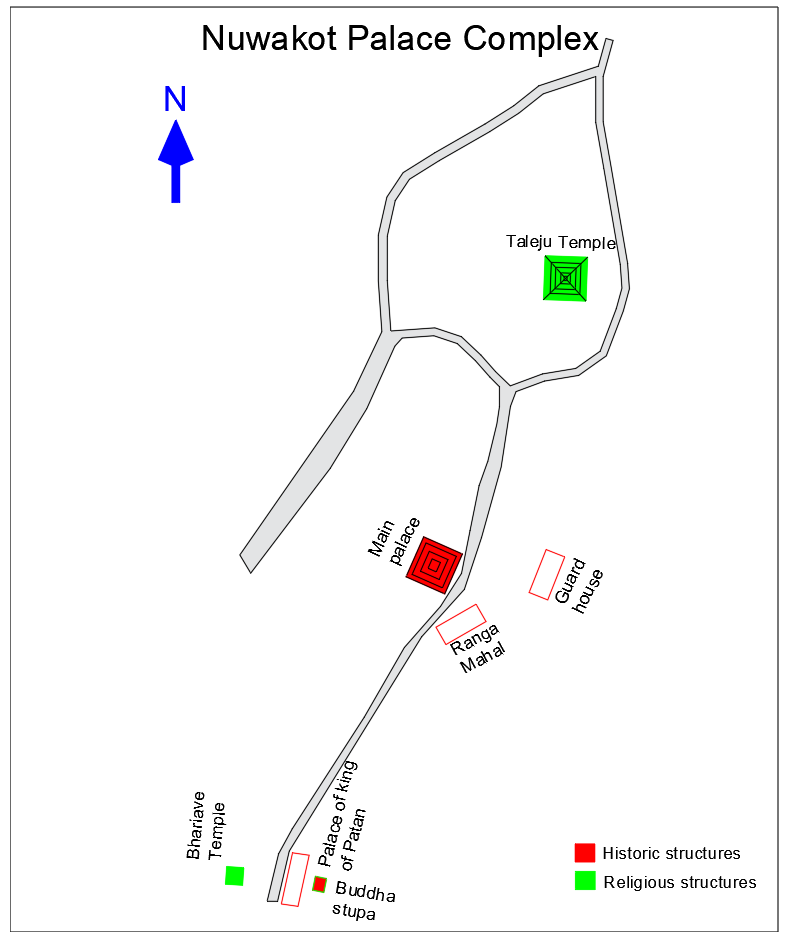

=== Ranga Mahal ===
On south-east side of the main palace lies the Ranga Mahal (lit. theatre). It was constructed in 1726 as the annex of the main palace. The kings of Kathmandu valley also used it for entertainment when they arrived Nuwakot.

=== Garad Ghar ===
On eastern side of the main palace lies a guard house (Nepali: Garad Ghar) where armed force and ammunitions were stationed.

=== House of Rana Bahadur Shah ===
On the north-east side, there is a house of King Rana Bahadur Shah. This was built in 1795. This building was turned in rubbles by 1957. The building was reconstructed in the time of King Mahendra.

=== Palace of king of Patan, Lampati ===
Lampati which used to be the palace of Patan's king is located adjacent to the Bhairavi temple. It has two floors with glazed tile in the roof. Currently, this palace is used as a museum.

== Temples around the palace ==
=== Bhairabi Temple ===
This temple is located 200m south of the main palace.

=== Narayan and Bishnu Temples ===
This temple is located in the eastern side of the main palace near the GaradGhar. This temple was constructed during the Malla period of Malla. An inscription of Ripu Malla, dating back to 1498, was found at the temple.

=== Taleju Bhawani Temple ===
This temple is located about 150 meters from the main palace over a small hill. This temple was also constructed by Mallas as Taleju is regarded as the ancestral deity of Mallas. The temple is five storied. The construction date is unknown; however, it is believed that it may have been built around 1400s.The act of worshipping taleju bhawani is still alive till today.In different festives devi taleju is worshipped.

=== Buddha Stupa ===
On the northern side lies a Buddhist stupa. The original construction date of this stupa is unknown. However, according to the inscription in the stupa, it was renovated by Prithivi Narayan Shah in 1773.In 2080 BSchaityas and buddhist statues were added in the site by the locals with the help of the local government.Below the statue of the god and goddess local who placed it has carved their′s and family′s members name.
