= Kaule, Nuwakot =

Kaule काउले
- Village development committee
- Location in Nepal
- Coordinates: 28.00°N 85.13°E
- Country: Nepal
- Zone: Bagmati Zone
- District: Nuwakot District

Population (1991)
  - Total: 2,976
- Time zone: UTC+5:45 (Nepal Time)

Kaule is a village development committee in Nuwakot District in the Bagmati Zone of central Nepal. At the time of the 1991 Nepal census it had a population of 2976 living in 605 individual households.
