= Nuwakot, Bagmati Province =

Nuwakot नुवाकोट
- Town
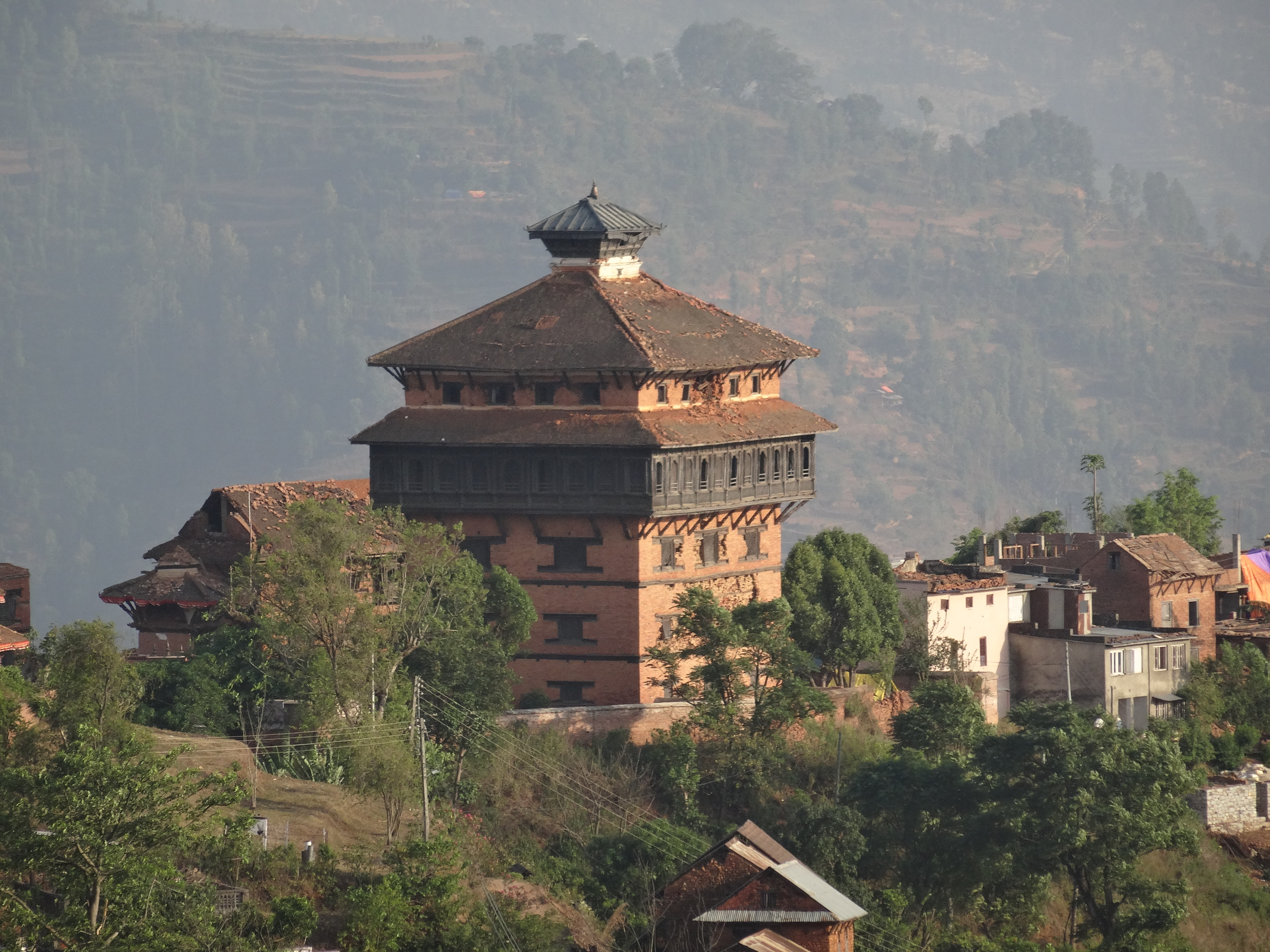
- Nuwakot Palace
- Nickname: City of Nine Hills
- Location in Bagmati Nuwakot (Nepal)
- Coordinates: 27°54′49″N 85°09′53″E
- Country: Nepal
- Province: Bagmati Province
- District: Nuwakot District
- Municipality: Bidur Municipality
- Elevation: 1,022 m (3,353 ft)
- Time zone: UTC+5:45 (Nepal Time)

Nuwakot (Nepali: नुवाकोट) is a town in central Nepal, serving as the namesake of the district of the same name. The town is located on the bank of Trishuli and Tadi Rivers. It is located around 60 kilometres west of Kathmandu, and is known as a historic town which was the capital of the Valley in the days before the unification of Nepal by Prithvi Narayan Shah, and for more than 1,000 years the hilltop had served as a lookout and fort (kot) guarding the western entrance to Kathmandu Valley. Nuwakot served as an important trading hub for the Malla kings of the Valley, and was along a major transit route used for trade between India and Tibet (via Kerung). Making the Nuwakot hill as main forts including other eight forts: Malakot, Simalkot, Bhairabkot, Belkot, Kalikot, Salyankot, Dhuwankot and Pyaskot in its surrounding area, collectively named as 'Nawakotta' (Nine forts).

Because of its significance, the fort was a target for conquest by neighboring kingdoms, including the Kingdom of Gorkha. The founder of modern Nepal, Prithvi Narayan Shah attacked and finally captured the hill fort in a surprise attack on September 26, 1744. The Malla king Jaya Prakash Malla made one final attempt to get victory over Nuwakot the following year after Malla forces under Kasi Ram Thapa Magar (Chief Commander of Kantipur and Nuwakot) had defeated the Gorkha army at Naldum. However, the Gorkha army was able to repel the attack and secured Nuwakot as a permanent fort under Gorkha control. Nuwakot would afterwards serve as one of the key staging grounds for the eventual conquest of all three Malla kingdoms in the Kathmandu Valley (Kathmandu, Patan, Bhadgaon), which fell between 1768 and 1769 to Prithvi Narayan Shah.

Nuwakot has featured in several prominent moments of Nepali history. Chinese forces under General Fu-k'ang-an nearly captured Nuwakot during the Nepal-China conflict in 1792. It was also the location of the first meeting between the British envoy Captain William J. Kirkpatrick and the acting Regent Bahadur Shah in 1793, shortly after the war with China ended.

The current seven-story Nuwakot Durbar and surrounding complex was expanded in the 18th century by Prithvi Narayan Shah to support the growing trade routes linking Kathmandu with India and Tibet. Built in the Malla style, the architecture of the complex is divided into the main palace, the Bhairab Temple, as well as other temples and shrines. In 2008 the site was submitted for consideration as a UNESCO World Heritage Site. Some of the temple complexes and buildings were damaged in the 2015 Nepal earthquake.

== Gallery ==
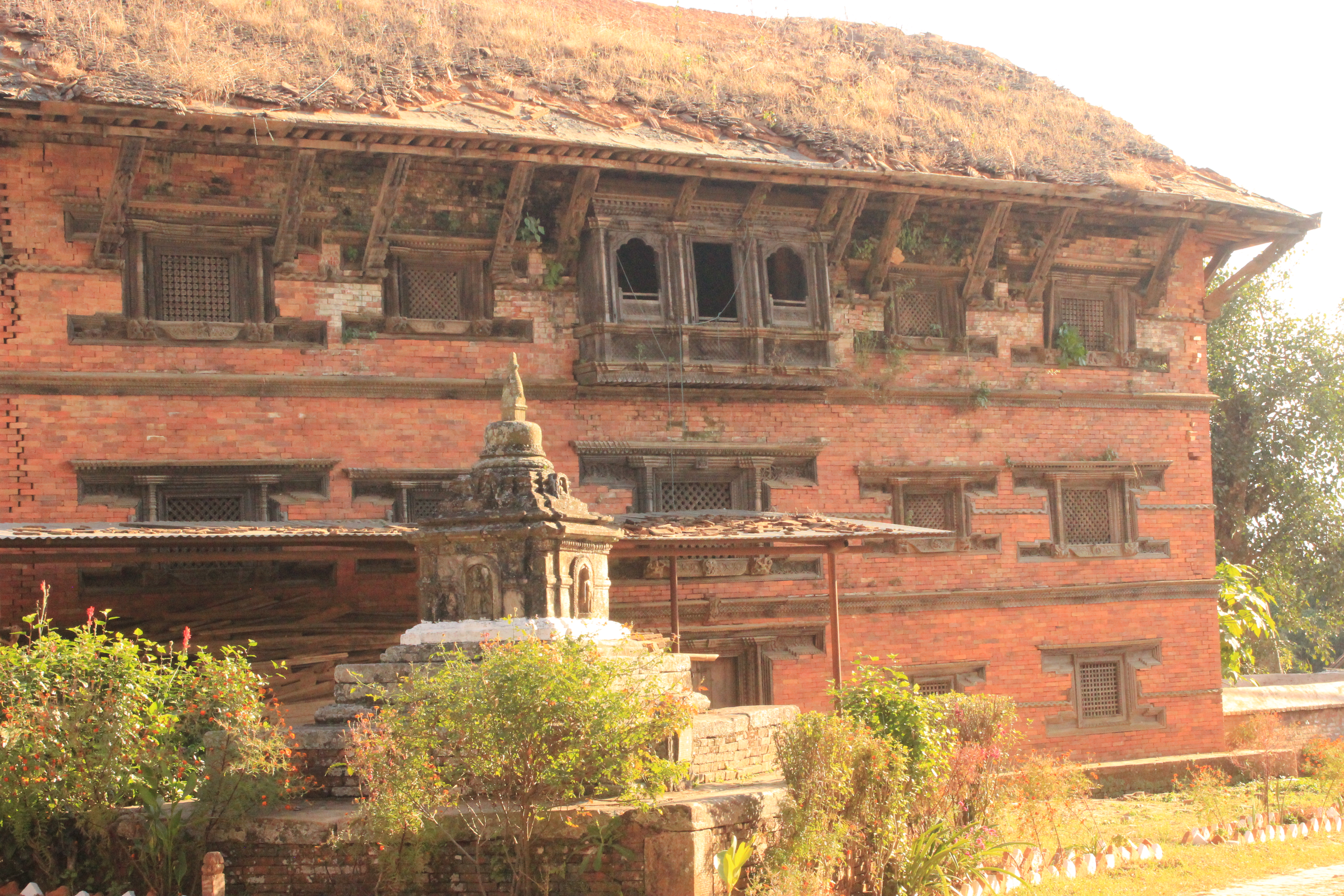
Malla-style palace

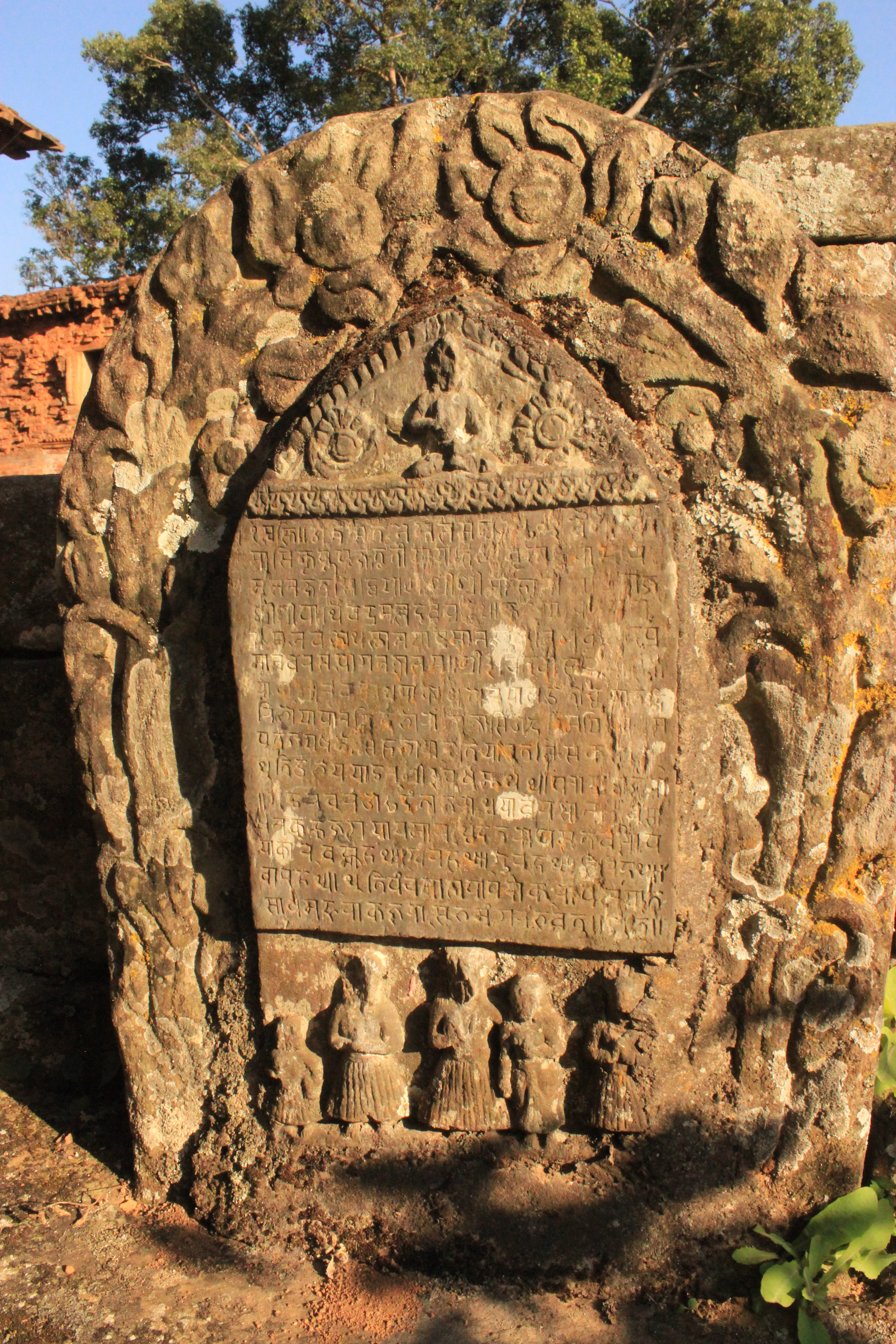
Stone inscription at Durbar

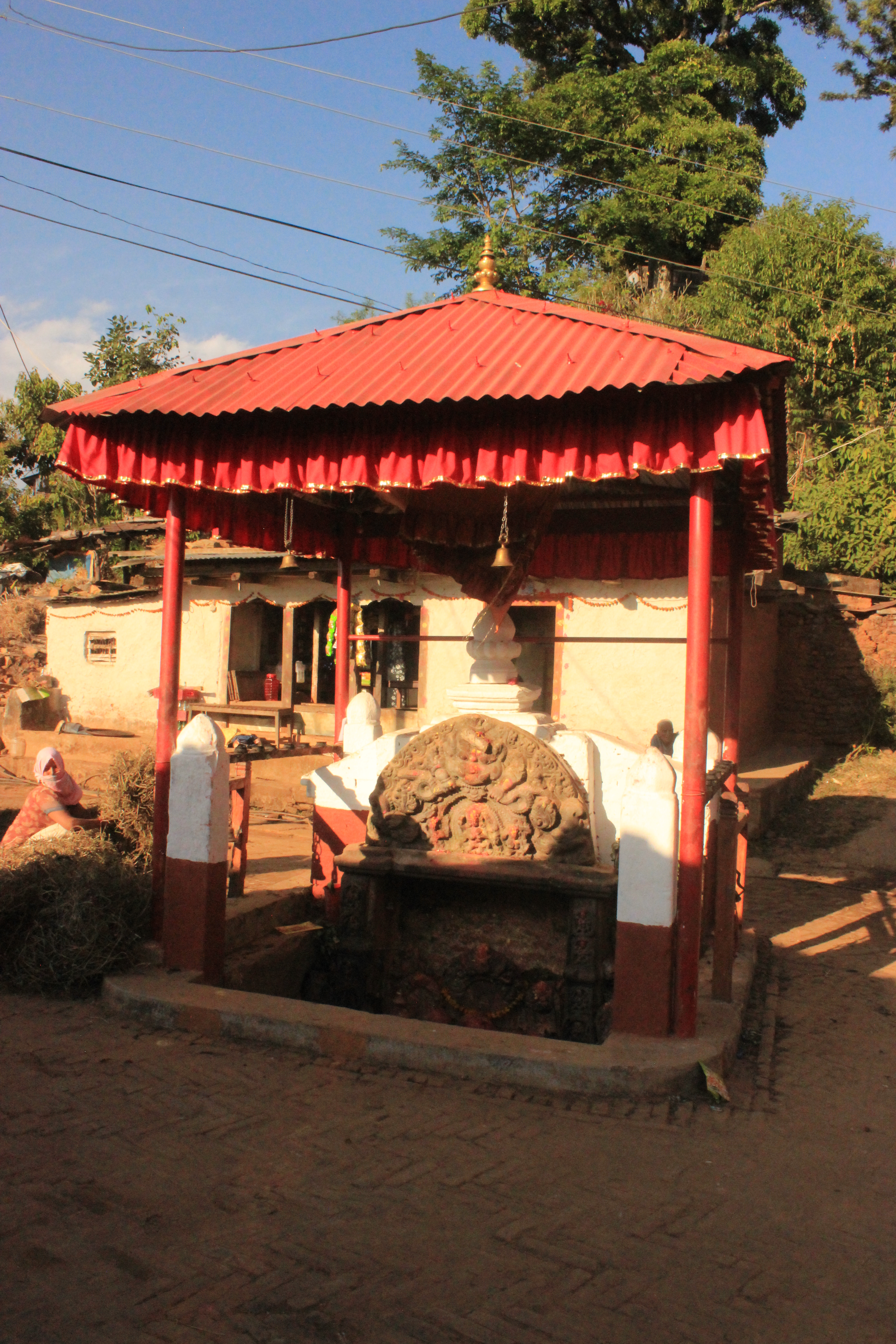
Taleju goddess

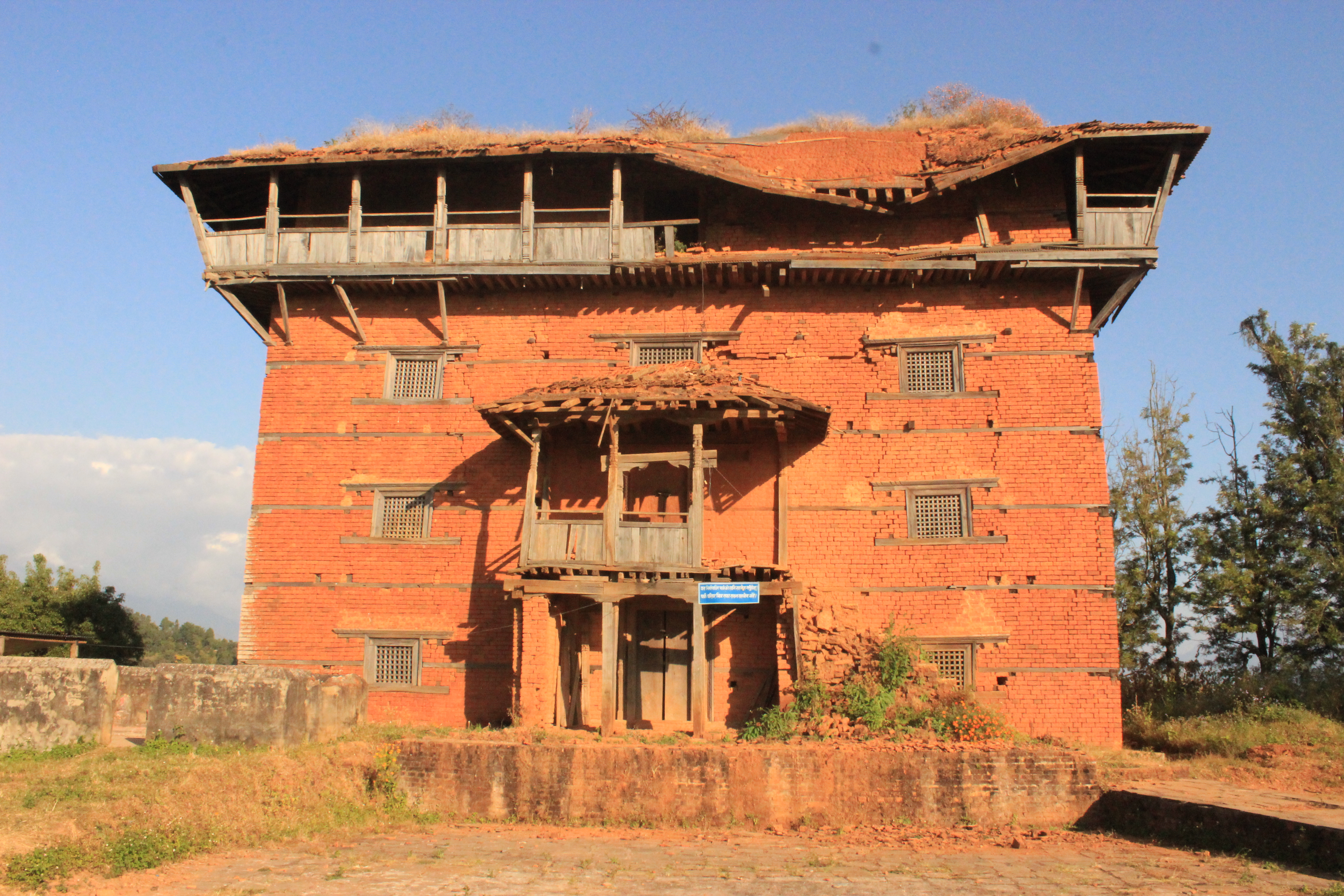
Taleju Bhawani temple complex

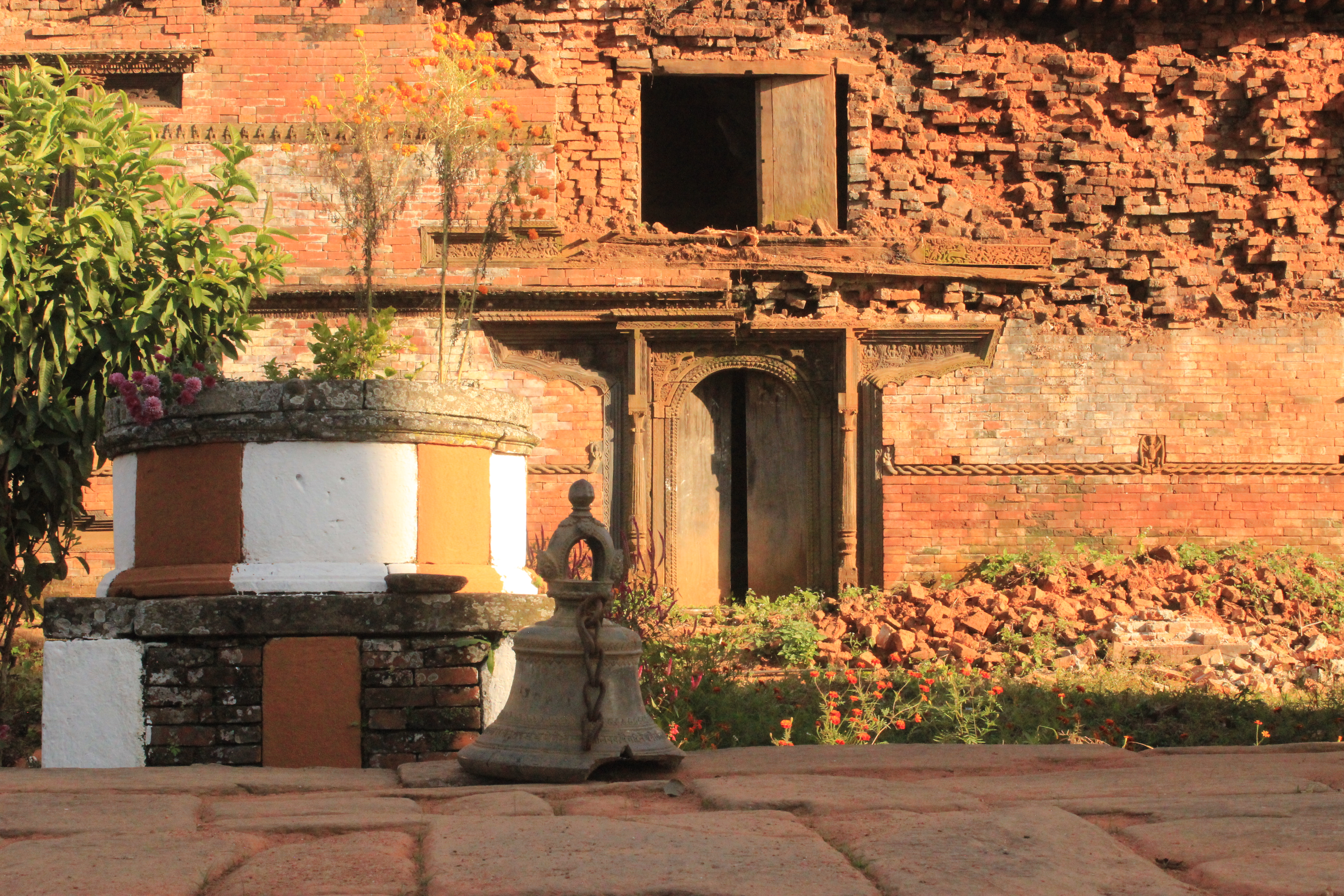
Malla-period palace damaged by 2015 earthquake

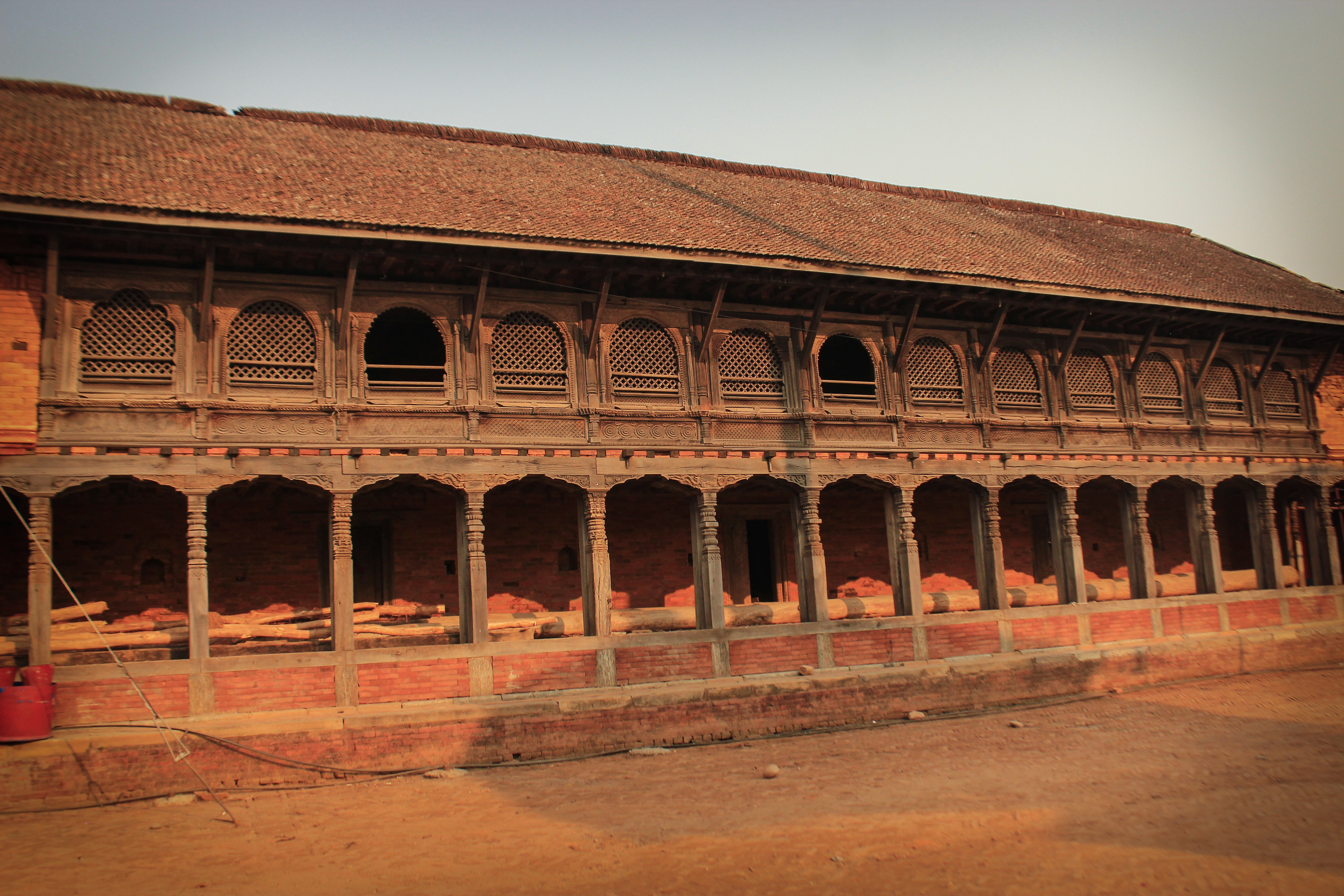
Patan Durbar
