= Madanpur, Nuwakot =

Coordinates: 27°51′N 85°13′E

Madanpur मदानपुर
- Village Development Committee
- Interactive map of Madanpur
- Country: Nepal
- Zone: Bagmati Zone
- District: Nuwakot District

Population (1991)
  - Total: 7,995
- Time zone: UTC+5:45 (Nepal Time)

Madanpur, Nepal is a Village Development Committee in Nuwakot District in the Bagmati Zone of central Nepal. At the time of the 1991 Nepal census it had a population of 7995 people residing in 1334 individual households.
