= Nuwakot District =

District in Bagmati Pradesh, Nepal

Nuwakot District नुवाकोट जिल्ला
- District
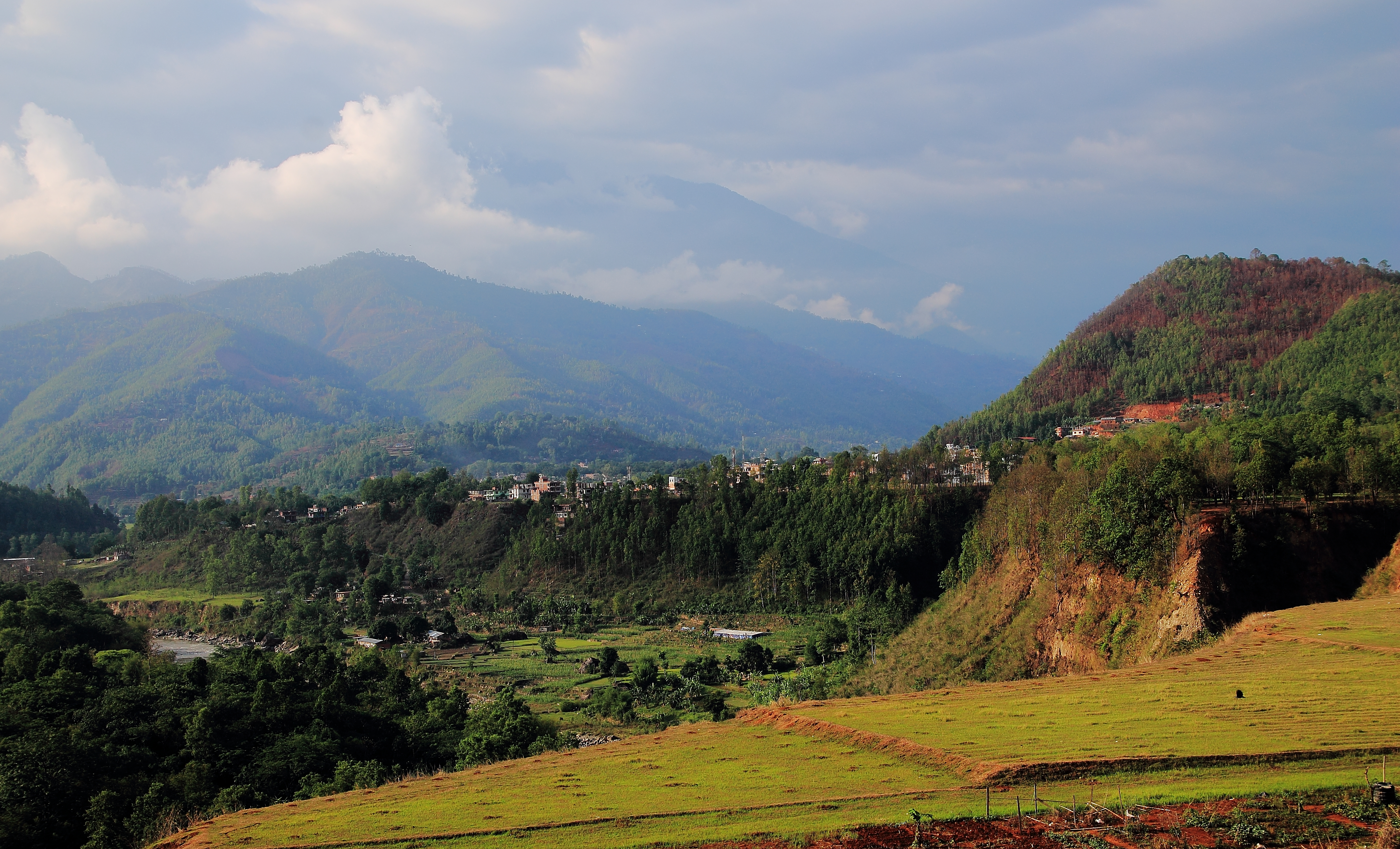
- Valley in Nuwakot

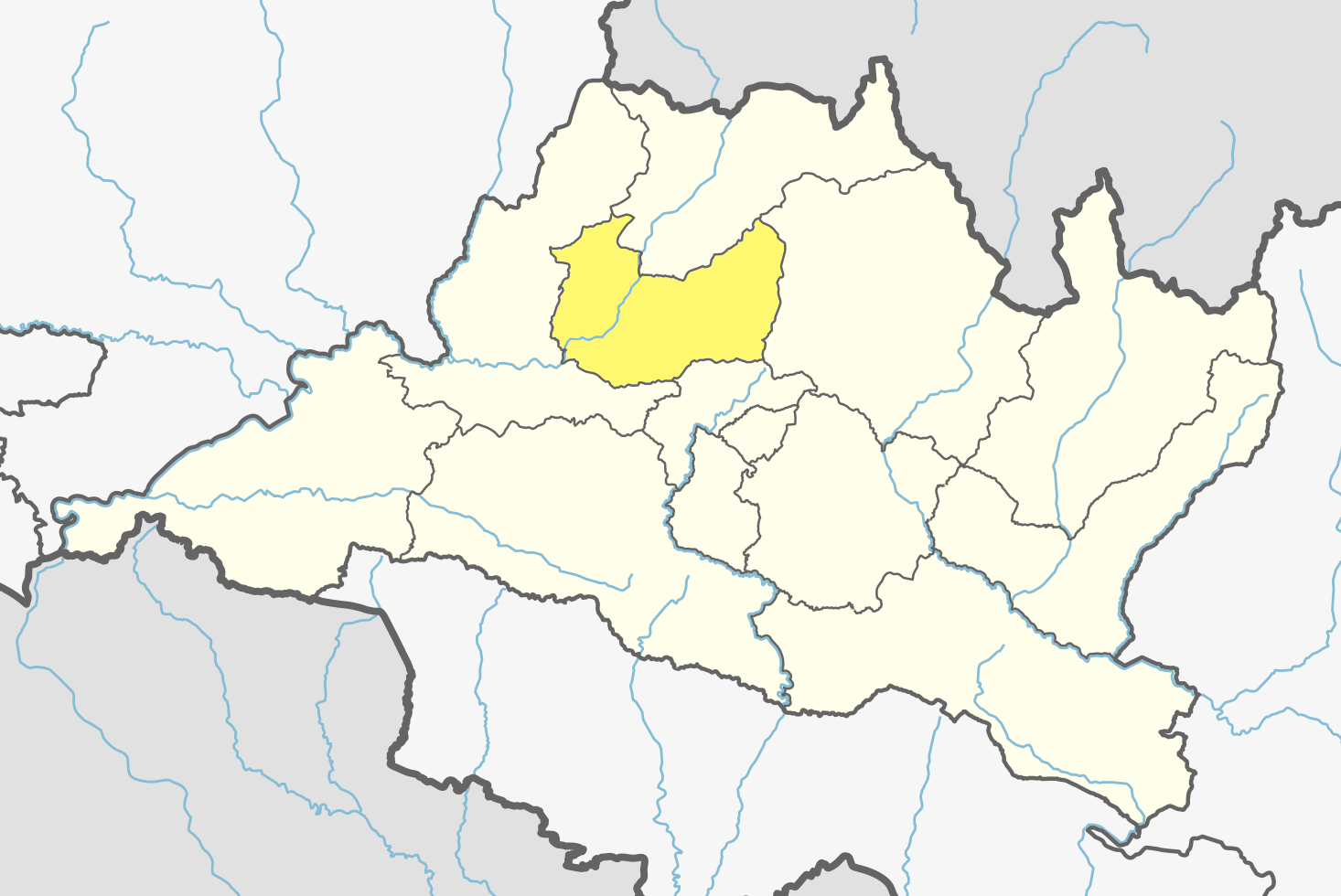
- Location of district in province
- Interactive map of Nuwakot District
- Coordinates: 27°54′39″N 85°8′43″E
- Country: Nepal
- Province: Bagmati Province
- Admin HQ.: Nuwakot (Bidur Municipality)

Government
  - Type: Coordination committee
  - Body: DCC, Nuwakot

Area
  - Total: 1,121 km^{2} (433 sq mi)

Population (2011)
  - Total: 277,471
  - Density: 247.5/km^{2} (641.1/sq mi)
- Time zone: UTC+05:45 (NPT)
- Postal Codes: 44900, 44908
- Main Language(s): Nepali, Tamang, Newar, Magar, Sherpa
- Website: http://www.dccnuwakot.gov.np

Nuwakot District (Nepali: नुवाकोट जिल्ला), a part of Bagmati Province, is one of the seventy-seven districts of Nepal. The district, with Bidur as its district headquarters, covers an area of 1,121 km^{2} (433 sq mi) and had a population of 263,391 per the 2021 Nepal census

The district contains places of historical significance such as the town of Nuwakot, and the village of Devighat (the death place of Prithvi Narayan Shah) located at the confluence of the Tadi and Trishuli Rivers. Kakani is popular among Nepalese people as a touristic place and picnic spot.

== Etymology ==
The name 'Nuwakot' is composed of two words 'nawa' and 'kot'. 'Nawa' means nine in Nepali and 'kot' refers to fortified or sacred hilltop sites. Accordingly, the district is traditionally associated with nine prominent hills on which various deities are believed to reside and protect the region. This has led to Nuwakot often being referred to as the "City of Nine Hills". The Gorkhali king Prithivi Narayan Shah invaded Nuwakot, which was then under the rule of Jaya Prakash Malla, and made Nuwakot the capital of his expanding kingdom. The present-day administrative boundaries of Nuwakot District differ from historical political divisions, as areas west of the Trishuli River—now part of present-day Dhading District—were historically associated with the Gorkha Kingdom rather than Nuwakot.

== Geography and climate ==
Climate zone	Elevation range	% of area
Upper tropical	300 to 1,000 meters 1,000 to 3,300 ft.	28.6%
Subtropical	1,000 to 2,000 meters 3,300 to 6,600 ft.	50.8%
Temperate	2,000 to 3,000 meters 6,400 to 9,800 ft.	13.4%
Subalpine	3,000 to 4,000 meters 9,800 to 13,100 ft.	3.9%
Alpine	4,000 to 5,000 meters 13,100 to 16,400 ft.	1.3%
Nival	above 5,000 meters	0.3%

== Demographics ==
Historical population
Census year	Pop.	±% p.a.
1981	202,976	—
1991	245,260	+1.91%
2001	288,478	+1.64%
2011	277,471	−0.39%
2021	262,981	−0.53%
Source: Citypopulation

At the time of the 2021 Nepal census, Nuwakot District had a population of 263,391. 7.22% of the population is under 5 years of age. It has a literacy rate of 69.07% and a sex ratio of 1042 females per 1000 males. 94,451 (35.86%) lived in municipalities.

Castes/ethnic groups in Nuwakot District (2021)
1. Tamang (43.2%)
2. Bahun (17.1%)
3. Chhetri (11.9%)
4. Newar (7.71%)
5. Rai (4.43%)
6. Kami (3.11%)
7. Magar (2.43%)
8. Sarki (1.95%)
9. Damai (1.95%)
10. Gurung (1.02%)
11. Ghale (1.01%)
12. Kumal (0.95%)
13. Other Hill Janajati (1.41%)
14. Others (1.74%)

Ethnicity wise: Hill Janajati were the largest group, making up 54% of the population. Tamang were the largest Hill Janajati group, making up 43% of the population, with smaller populations of Rai, Magar and Gurung people. Khas are the second largest group, making up 37% of the population. Newars were the third largest group, making up 7% of the population.

Languages of Nuwakot district (2021)
1. Nepali (51.0%)
2. Tamang (40.8%)
3. Nepal Bhasha (3.28%)
4. Danuwar (1.11%)
5. Rai (0.97%)
6. Others (2.85%)

At the time of the 2021 census, 51.01% of the population spoke Nepali, 40.78% Tamang, 3.28% Nepal Bhasha, 1.11% Danuwar and 0.97% Rai as their first language. In 2011, 54.5% of the population spoke Nepali as their first language.

Religion in Nuwakot District (2021)
Religion	Percent
Hinduism	56.98%
Buddhism	38.13%
Christianity	2.55%
Kirat Mundhum	2.09%
Other or not stated	0.25%

== Administration ==
The district consists of 12 municipalities, out of which two are urban municipalities and ten are rural municipalities. These are as follows:

- Bidur Municipality
- Belkotgadhi Municipality
- Kakani Rural Municipality
- Panchakanya Rural Municipality
- Likhu Rural Municipality
- Dupcheshwar Rural Municipality
- Shivapuri Rural Municipality
- Tadi Rural Municipality
- Suryagadhi Rural Municipality
- Tarkeshwar Rural Municipality
- Kispang Rural Municipality
- Myagang Rural Municipality

== Economy ==
Nuwakot, being a hilly area with very less plains, most of the areas are still undeveloped. In last few years, huge changes are observable. The city areas are provided with schools, colleges, hospitals and the road infrastructure is also developed. Two hydro power stations are currently in operation, and from 2020 the first part of the biggest solar power station (Nuwakot Solar Power Station) was consented to the electric grid of Nepal. People are dependent on agriculture, teaching, foreign economy, livestock farming, business, hotels, Agro Tourism, Eco-Tourism and Khadya Bank, etc.

== Additional local insights ==
Nuwakot retains a strong oral history tradition in which local elders pass down accounts of the unification period, including strategic movements and daily life under early Shah rule. These narratives often differ in detail from formal historical records, reflecting localized interpretations of national events.

Several hilltop settlements in Nuwakot still follow traditional settlement planning, where houses are aligned to maximize sunlight exposure and agricultural efficiency. This reflects adaptation to mid-hill geography and seasonal climate patterns.

The district features a mix of ethnic communities, including Tamang, Brahmin, Chhetri, and Newar populations, contributing to a diverse cultural landscape. Each community maintains distinct rituals, dress styles, and festivals, often blending into shared regional practices.

Agriculture remains the dominant livelihood, with terrace farming widely practiced. Crops such as rice, maize, millet, and mustard are cultivated based on elevation and seasonal rainfall patterns. Livestock rearing is also integrated into household economies.

Traditional building techniques in rural areas still rely on locally sourced materials such as stone, mud mortar, and timber. These methods are adapted for insulation and structural stability in hilly terrain, although many were vulnerable during the 2015 earthquake.

Local markets (haat bazaars) play a significant role in the rural economy, operating on weekly cycles where agricultural produce, livestock, and household goods are exchanged. These markets also function as social gathering points.

Nuwakot's landscape includes a network of rivers and streams, such as the Trishuli River, which supports irrigation, fishing, and small-scale hydropower activities in nearby areas.

Migration trends have influenced the district's demographic patterns, with many youths seeking employment in urban centers or abroad, while older generations maintain agricultural and cultural practices in the villages.

Researched by Diplap kadel

== Special Economic Zone ==
Jiling is recognized as an SEZ Area where business flourishes and there is an intent to grow business and economy of Nuwakot. NEPAL KHADYA BANK LTD. has established at Kashitar to serve farmers in Food Security, Food Banking, Grain Storage, Supply and Distribution.

== See ==
Nuwakot, Bagmati : A seven-storey palace lies on the top of Bidur Municipality. Views of Nuwakot can be observed from the spot.

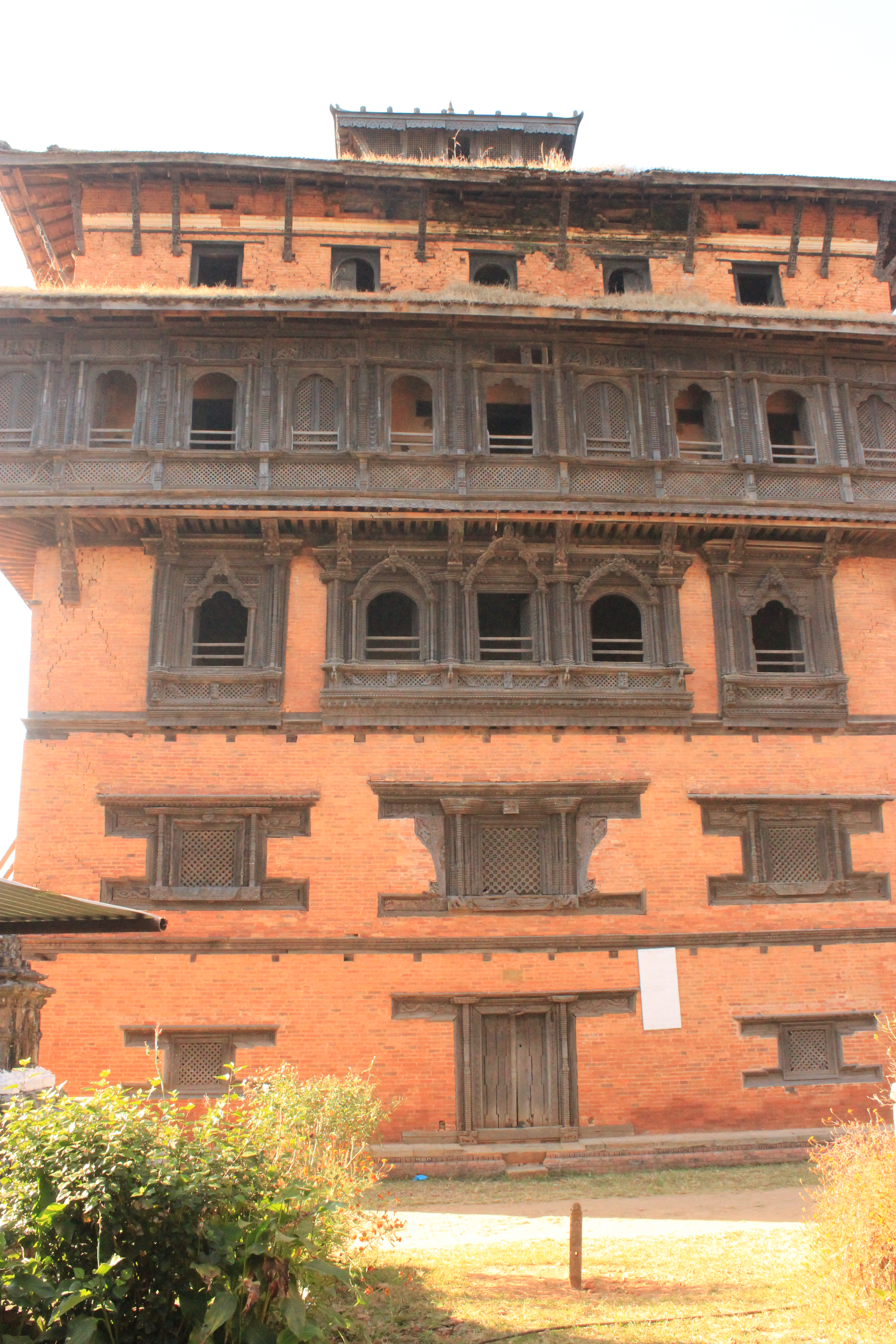
Saat Talle Durbar

Trishuli River : One of the major river of Saptagandaki passes right through mid area of Nuwakot.

Kakani : A gateway from Kathmandu to Nuwakot. A common place for observing sunset and the mountains.

Devighat : Near the union of Trishuli and Suryamati (Tadi) river lies devighat. This place is historically important. The death place of the great king Prithvi Narayan Shah lies here.

Kashitar : One of the major place where people work in Eco Tourism, Agri Tourism and Food Security.

== Religious places ==
Nuwakot, being mainly Hindu by religion, has many historically as well as religiously important places.

- Bhairabi Temple
- Jalpa devi Temple
- Dupcheshwar Mahadev Temple
- Chimteshor Mahadev
- Bandevi Temple
- Panchakanya Temple
- Indra Kamala Temple
- Baghabhairam Temple
- Uttargaya Dhama
- Shree Bachchhala Devi Temple
- Sundaradevi Satatale Temple
- Kali Pokhari Mahadev Temple
- Trishuli Ram Mandir
- Dudhelama mai Temple
- SuryaGadhi Temple
- Buddish Stupa

Indrakamala Mai Temple is a religious and cultural place in Nuwakot district, which is 18 km far from Bidur the headquarter of Nuwakot and 8 km from Kakani Rural Municipality Office. It lies in the Kakani Rural Municipality ward number −8 under Bagmati province. It is surrounded with natural greenery and located at the beach of the three gorges where thousands of devotees come for worshiping god Indrakamala basically in Dashain. It is believed to achieved aims and desires after worshiping.

== See also ==
- Nuwakot, Bagmati
- Bidur
- Kakani
- Trishuli Bazar

== Notable people ==
- Ram Sharan Mahat
- Dipendra K. Khanal
- Lawa Pyakurel
- Pukar Raj Simha Bhandari
- Arjun Narasingha KC
- Prakash Chandra Lohani
- Mahendra Bahadur Pandey
- Kedar Narsingh KC
- Anjali Lama
- Narayan Prasad Khatiwada
- Kishor Nepal
